= Florida State Road 189 =

State highway in Florida, United States

State Road 189
- Florida State Road 189 highlighted in red

Route information
- Maintained by FDOT

Southern segment
- Length: 10.523 mi (16.935 km)
- South end: US 98 in Fort Walton Beach
- North end: SR 397 at Eglin AFB

Northern segment
- Length: 14.405 mi (23.183 km)
- South end: SR 4 in Baker
- North end: SR 137 towards Andalusia, AL

Location
- Country: United States
- State: Florida
- Counties: Okaloosa

Highway system
- Florida State Highway System; Interstate; US; State; Former; Pre‑1945; Toll; Scenic
← SR 188	→ SR 190

State Road 189 (SR 189) is a north–south highway in the panhandle of Florida. It leads from U.S. Route 98 in downtown Fort Walton Beach to just east of State Road 85 at the Eglin AFB West Gate where its southern section terminates. The northern section begins at an intersection with State Road 4 in Baker, Florida north to the Alabama / Florida state line where Alabama State Route 137 begins upon crossing the Alabama state line.

The common name for the southern portion of the highway is Beal Parkway from its origin at U.S. Route 98 to its intersection with Green Acres Road. At that junction the road becomes Lewis Turner Boulevard to its termination at the Eglin AFB gate.

Both segments were once connected through Eglin AFB.

== Future ==
Part of SR 189 will be resurfaced in 2012.

The Five Mile Bayou bridge is labeled as structurally deficient. There are plans to replace the bridge starting in 2014 with two 12-foot travel lanes in each direction.

== Major intersections ==
The entire route is in Okaloosa County.

Location	mi	km	Destinations	Notes
Fort Walton Beach	0.000	0.000	US 98 (Miracle Strip Parkway / SR 30) – Destin, Mary Esther	South end of southern section
Fort Walton Beach	1.318	2.121	CR 85A east (Yacht Club Drive)	
Wright	2.848	4.583	SR 393 south (Mary Esther Cut-off Northwest) – Mary Esther	
Wright	4.318	6.949	SR 188 east (Racetrack Road) / Hurlburt Field Road – Hurlburt Field, Ocean City	
Eglin AFB	10.015	16.118	SR 85 – Niceville, Valparaiso, Shalimar, Eglin AFB North Gate, Airport	
Eglin AFB	10.523	16.935	SR 397 south (Eglin Boulevard) – Eglin AFB, Shalimar, VA Outpatient Clinic	North end of southern section
Gap in route
Baker	0.000	0.000	SR 4 – Milligan, Munson	South end of northern section
	1.504	2.420	CR 4A west	
Blackman	9.592	15.437	CR 2 east	
Escambia Farms	11.836	19.048	CR 180 west	
	14.405	23.183	SR 137 north – Andalusia	Alabama state line
1.000 mi = 1.609 km; 1.000 km = 0.621 mi

== Related routes ==
=== County Road 189 ===
County Road 189
- Location: Holt–Baker

County Road 189 is a county extension of State Road 189 in west central Okaloosa County. It spans from I-10 at Exit 45 in Holt as Log Lake Road, where it runs north to the hear of Holt, and turns east in a concurrency with US 90. The concurrency ends in Galliver, where CR 90 turns north and later ends at State Road 4 in Baker, thus becoming a hidden concurrency with SR 4 until it branches off to the north as a state highway.

=== County Road 189A ===
County Road 189A
- Location: Holt–Baker

County Road 189A in northwestern Okaloosa County is a county suffixed alternate of CR 189. The route begins in Holt at US 90 two blocks east of the west end of the concurrency with CR 189 as Main Street. After the intersection of Fourth Street it becomes Poplar Head Church Road. It takes a sharp right turn to the east and at the intersection with Gerald Brooks Road it is renamed Melton Road. CR 189A ends at SR 4 just west of Baker.

=== County Road 189A ===
County Road 189A
- Location: Cinco Bayou–Fort Walton Beach

County Road 189A in southeastern Okaloosa County is a county suffixed alternate of SR 189. The road is named Yacht Club Drive and spans from SR 189 in Cinco Bayou to Ferry Road Northeast in Fort Walton Beach.
