= Frank A. Walls =

Executed American serial killer (1967–2025)

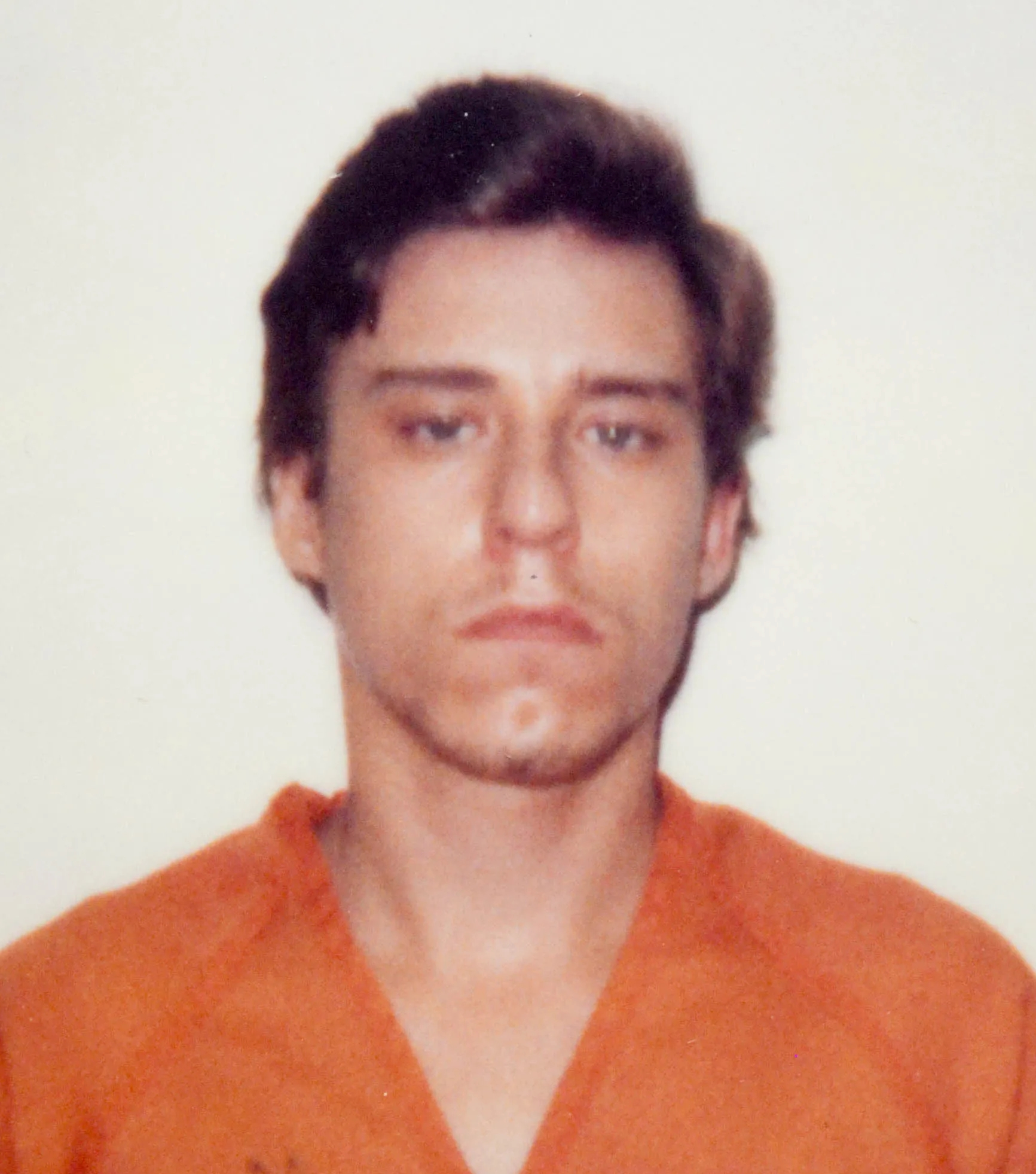
- Mug shot of Walls in 1987
- Born: October 12, 1967; Ocean City, Florida, U.S.
- Died: December 18, 2025 (aged 58); Florida State Prison, Florida, U.S.
- Status: Executed by lethal injection
- Convictions: First degree murder (3 counts); Burglary (2 counts); Kidnapping
- Penalty: Death

Details
- Victims: 5
- Span of crimes: March 26, 1985 – July 22, 1987
- Country: United States
- State: Florida
- Date apprehended: July 24, 1987
- Imprisoned at: Union Correctional Institution

Frank Athen Walls (October 12, 1967 – December 18, 2025) was an American serial killer and rapist who committed five murders between 1985 and 1987 in Okaloosa County, Florida. He was initially convicted of two murders and sentenced to death on one count and to a 25-year-to-life term for the other. Years later, he was linked to a third murder via DNA and eventually confessed to the remaining two murders. He later pleaded guilty to avoid further prosecution.

Walls was on death row at Union Correctional Institution. He was executed on December 18, 2025, by lethal injection, following a death warrant signed by Governor Ron DeSantis.

== Early life ==
Walls was born on October 12, 1967, in Ocean City, Florida. He is known to have started committing crimes at an early age, ranging from burglaries to peeping on young women and abusing animals. At the time his crime spree began, he worked as a dishwasher at a restaurant called "Quincy's" and was roommates with a man named Thomas "Animal" Farnham. Farnham would later claim that he was wary of Walls, due to the fact that he often talked about morose topics such as raping and killing people.

== Murders ==
Walls committed his first murder on March 26, 1985, at the age of 17. On that date, he was on Okaloosa Island doing community service when he noticed 19-year-old junior college student Tommie Lou Whiddon sunbathing at the beach. Brandishing a knife, he went up to her and slashed her throat, leaving her to bleed out. Walls then stole her car, which was found the following day parked behind a random building. That same evening, Whiddon's body was found by a random person walking on the beach.

On September 16, 1986, he killed a second woman in Wright, 24-year-old Cynthia Sue Condra, by stabbing her 21 times and then leaving her body on the side of a road.

On May 20, 1987, Walls broke into a mobile home near Fort Walton Beach, occupied by 47-year-old Audrey Gygi, an employee at a local Kel-Tec. While it is unclear what exactly transpired, it is believed that Walls raped her and then left, but later changed his mind, deciding to come back and kill her. After encountering Gygi a second time, he stabbed her to death, stole a fan and a radio, and left the crime scene. Her nude body was found early in the morning after a co-worker reported her missing after she failed to show up at her workplace.

=== Alger–Peterson murder ===
In the early morning hours of July 22, Walls committed a double murder. He broke into a mobile home in Ocean City's Greenwood Mobile Home Park, at the time inhabited by 22-year-old Eglin Air Force Base airman Edward Alger and his girlfriend, 20-year-old Anne Louise Peterson, and intentionally knocked over a fan to wake the occupants up.

When Alger and Peterson arrived to check what the noise was, Walls forced Peterson to tie up her boyfriend's hands and ankles, before he did the same to her. At some point, however, Alger loosened up the bindings and attacked Walls, but was knocked to the ground and had his throat cut. Still alive, Alger bit Walls on the hand, causing him to drop the knife. Undeterred by this, Walls then pulled out a gun and shot Alger three times in the head, killing him.

Walls then returned to Peterson, removed her gag and started assaulting her. At one point, he grabbed his gun and shot her in the head – the shot proved to be non-fatal, at which point Walls put a pillow over her face and shot again, killing her. He then stole $200, a worn leather wallet and an oscillating fan, and then left. The couple's bodies were found on July 23, after one of Alger's superiors noticed that he had not arrived at work.

== Arrest, investigation, and trials ==
The day after Alger and Peterson's bodies were discovered, Walls was arrested after his roommate provided information to law enforcement officials. As a result, Walls was charged with two counts of first-degree murder, two counts of kidnapping, armed robbery, burglary, grand theft and possession of stolen property. An inspection of his trailer home led to the discovery of stolen items from the crime scene, and Walls himself later admitted responsibility for the murders.

While he was awaiting trial for the double murder, Okaloosa County Police Department created a special unit to re-examine recent unsolved murders in an attempt to link them to Walls, as they suspected that he had had previous victims. One case authorities paid special attention to was the Gygi murder, as a search of Walls' trailer led to the recovery of a fan similar to the one stolen from her mobile home and also had a single fingerprint, later identified to be hers.

=== Investigation ===
As they had the most evidence with the Alger–Peterson double murder, prosecutors requested that Walls be tried for only this crime. While he was detained at the Okaloosa County Jail in Crestview to await trial, a grand jury was organized at the Shalimar Courthouse Annex in Shalimar to decide whether there was enough evidence for an indictment.

On August 11, 1987, Walls was officially indicted on multiple charges, to which he pleaded not guilty. His judge was set to be G. Robert Barron, with Chief Assistant State Attorney Drew Pinkerton acting as prosecutor while Assistant Public Defender Earl D. Loveless would act as Walls' public defender. In the indictment, Pinkerton outlined a list of items recovered from the search of Walls' trailer, including ice picks; knives; a .22-caliber pistol; bullets; eight .22-caliber casings; a holster; a box cutter; a rubber-handed hatchet; unspecified pornographic material; a wallet; a chainsaw; a pair of burnt boots; four telephones; three fans; two lawnmowers and 93 articles of clothing, including a pair of bloodied jeans.

Prior to the trial's beginning, Judge Barron ordered that Walls must provide any biological samples necessary to the prosecutors, as well as undergoing a forensic psychiatric exam. On August 12, Walls' roommate, 21-year-old John Early, was charged for his role in stealing an Oldsmobile from Rodon's Auto Sales with the help of Walls, the same vehicle the latter would use to drive to the victims' trailer. Early was also charged with an additional charge of burglary stemming from the burglarization of a home he had done with Walls in mid-July.

In March 1988, the trial was delayed at the prosecutors' request, after a report by psychiatrist Dr. James Larson suggested that Walls might be incompetent to stand trial. Larson's assessment led to a dispute with another witness, Dr. Theodore Marshall, who stated that while Walls suffered from a personality disorder, he was sane and exaggerating the severity of his mental deficiencies.

In the end, Judge Barron ruled that Walls was competent to stand trial and scheduled it for July 11. While considering arguments from both the prosecutors and the defense team, Barron included the testimony of Vickie Beck, a correctional officer at the Okaloosa County Jail. Beck claimed that she took notes during an interrogation with Walls and that he supposedly indicated to her that he was faking his mental illness. The testimony was considered controversial and Walls' public defender objected to it, claiming that Beck had not properly informed his client of his right to stay silent.

=== Trials ===
In July 1988, a 12-member jury was selected for Walls' trial, with prosecutors seeking the death penalty against him. The trial officially began on July 15 of that year.

After only six days, Walls was found guilty on two counts of first-degree murder. Walls was initially scheduled to be sentenced on August 18, but the verdict was delayed because Judge Barron fell ill. A week later, on August 25, Walls was officially sentenced to death for the murder of Ann Peterson, and to life imprisonment with a chance of parole after 25 years for the murder of Edward Alger.

Shortly after his conviction, Walls and his attorneys requested a new trial, claiming there were issues concerning his competency hearing. The Supreme Court of Florida eventually reversed Walls' convictions and ordered a new trial, moving the venue to Marianna to avoid pre-trial publicity.

In July 1992, Walls was found unanimously guilty, with Judge Barron reinstating his original sentences given at the first trial.

== Aftermath and execution ==
=== Link to other murders ===
Less than a year after his second trial, Walls was linked via DNA to the Gygi murder, much to the relief of her relatives, who said in interviews with the media that they knew he was guilty all along. In an attempt to avoid a second trial and another potential death sentence, Walls pleaded no contest to the Gygi murder and admitted responsibility for killing Whiddon and Condra, in exchange for avoiding trial for the former and not being prosecuted for the latter two.

About a month after this plea, sheriffs from neighboring Walton County announced that they were investigating Walls as a possible suspect in another murder. This was the murder of 35-year-old Lindsay Sams, a woman from Columbus, Mississippi who was found severely beaten at a condominium in Miramar Beach on October 5, 1986. Whilst she initially survived the attack, she was unable to provide any clue to her attacker and later succumbed to her injuries at a hospital in Memphis, Tennessee. When questioned, Walls categorically refused to answer any questions, claiming that he felt betrayed by police due to the publicity surrounding his confessions.

While he remained a long-time suspect in the case according to FDLE agent Dennis Haley, law enforcement attention later turned their attention to Mark Riebe, the stepfather of Walls' then-girlfriend, after he and his brother were convicted of a similar murder and sentenced to life imprisonment. Despite this, Riebe has never been prosecuted for the murder of Sams, which remains unsolved.

=== Appeals ===
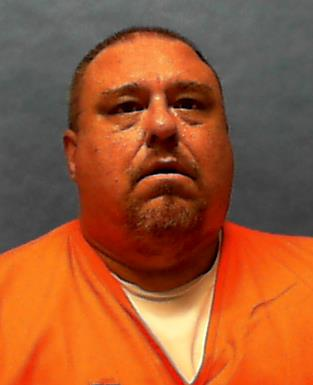
Walls on death row

In 2017, Walls submitted an appeal in which he argued that his death sentence should be overturned on the grounds that he has an IQ of 72, which would qualify him as borderline intellectually disabled. This appeal was rejected in the following year, with Circuit Court Judge William Stone noting that Walls had taken multiple IQ tests in previous years and had scored around 100 IQ for most of them, leading Stone to believe that he intentionally underperformed so he can have a chance of having his sentence reduced on the grounds of intellectual disability.

In 2021, Okaloosa County Circuit Court Judge William Stone denied Walls's claim that an "intellectual disability" should prevent the state from sentencing him to death, and is subject to appeal at both the state and federal levels, according to Assistant State's Attorney John Molchan.

In 2023, Walls filed an appeal for post-conviction relief on the grounds that his intellectual disability should be judged by the new laws implemented in the state since his conviction, but this was also denied and his death sentence was upheld.

On December 8, 2025, Walls's attorneys filed a lengthy appeal to the Florida Supreme Court, asking to halt Walls's execution on the basis of intellectual disability, which would violate the Eighth Amendment under cruel and unusual punishment arguments. His attorneys pointed to his allegedly subaverage IQ between 72 and 74 and cited Roper v. Simmons to argue that it should also apply to Walls, who committed his crimes at the age of 19, saying that his state of mind at the time of the crimes were not different to that of someone below the age of 18. The state filed a response, rejecting all points from Walls' defense.

=== Death warrant and execution ===
On November 18, 2025, Florida governor Ron DeSantis signed a death warrant for Walls, scheduling him to be executed on December 18, 2025.

Walls' crimes left a lasting impact on Okaloosa County, with many residents claiming that he permanently scarred the community. Don Vinson, the Chief Investigator at the time when Walls was arrested, claimed that the killer's hometown of Ocean City remains especially affected by him. Vinson died in 2022.

Walls' attorneys filed a last-ditch appeal to the U.S. Supreme Court for a stay of execution on December 15, this appeal was denied.

On December 18, 2025, Walls was executed by lethal injection at Florida State Prison, and was declared dead at 6:11 p.m. Eastern Standard Time. His last meal was chicken, steak, baked potato, vegetables, cheesecake, and juice.

Nearing the end of 2025, Walls was one of 19 Florida death row inmates executed in the United States that same year, which became the highest number of inmates executed in Florida in a single year to date since the nation's 1976 resumption of capital punishment.

== See also ==
- List of serial killers in the United States
- List of people executed in Florida
- List of people executed in the United States in 2025

Executions carried out in Florida
Preceded by Mark Allen Geralds December 9, 2025	Frank Athen Walls; December 18, 2025	Succeeded by Ronald Palmer Heath February 10, 2026
Executions carried out in the United States
Preceded by Harold Wayne Nichols – Tennessee December 11, 2025	Frank Athen Walls – Florida; December 18, 2025	Succeeded by Charles Victor Thompson – Texas January 28, 2026
