= List of state roads in Florida =

- Standard State Road shields

Highway names
- Interstates: Interstate X (I-X)
- US Highways: U.S. Highway X (US X)
- State: State Road X (SR X)
- County: County Road X (CR X)

System links
- Florida State Highway System; Interstate; US; State; Former; Pre‑1945; Toll; Scenic

The following is a list of state roads in the U.S. state of Florida. Only the length of state-maintained roads is given; occasionally a locally maintained connection is signed as part of a state road.

== Routes ==
Route	From (south or west)	To (north or east)	Length (mi)	Length (km)	Notes
SR A1A	Bertha Street in Key West	US 1 (SR 5) in Key West	2.895	4.659	Overseas Highway
SR A1A	US 1 / I-395 (SR 5 / SR 836) in Miami	US 1 (SR 5) in West Palm Beach	74.894	120.530	
SR A1A	US 1/ SR 708 (SR 5) in Riviera Beach	US 1/ SR 786 (SR 5) in Palm Beach Gardens	6.207	9.989	
SR A1A	SR 714 in Stuart	US 1/ SR 528 (SR 5) in Cocoa	105.934	170.484	
SR A1A	6th Avenue in New Smyrna Beach	US 1/ SR 44 (SR 5) in New Smyrna Beach	2.289	3.684	
SR A1A	US 1/ SR 421 (SR 5) in Port Orange	US 1 / US 23 / US 301 (SR 15 / SR 200) in Callahan	146.533	235.822	
SR 2	SR 81 in Royals Crossroads	SR 91 at Georgia state line	63.454	102.119	
SR 2	SR 94 at Georgia state line	SR 94 at Georgia state line	15.539	25.008	
SR 3	SR 520 in Merritt Island	SR 321 in Kennedy Space Center	11.272	18.141	
SR 4	US 29 (SR 95) in Century	US 90 (SR 10) in Milligan	43.705	70.336	
SR 5	Fleming Street in Key West	US 17 / SR 25 at Georgia state line	533.486	858.562	mostly carries US 1 and US 17
SR 5A	US 1 (SR 5) in Port Orange	US 1 (SR 5) in Ormond Beach	15.613	25.127	
SR 5A	US 1 (SR 5) in St. Augustine	US 1 (SR 5) in St. Augustine	3.243	5.219	carries US 1 Bus.
SR 6	US 90 (SR 10) near Madison	US 41 / US 129 (SR 25 / SR 51 / SR 100) in Jasper	27.408	44.109	
SR 7	US 41 (SR 90) in Miami	60th Street North in Loxahatchee	70.066	112.760	mostly carries US 441; Northern extension proposed
SR 8	I-10 at Alabama state line	I-95/ US 17/ SR 228 (SR 9/ SR 15) in Jacksonville	362.057	582.674	carries I-10
SR 8A	US 98 Bus. (SR 30) in Pensacola	I-10 (SR 8) in Ferry Pass	6.341	10.205	carries I-110
SR 9	US 1 (SR 5) in Miami	I-95 (SR 405) at Georgia state line	383.327	616.905	mostly carries I-95
SR 9A (Miami)	US 1 (SR 5) in Miami	I-95 / Turnpike / US 441 / SR 9 / SR 826 (SR 7 / SR 91) in North Miami Beach	13.116	21.108	carries I-95
SR 9A (Jacksonville)	I-95 (SR 9) in Jacksonville	full beltway	60.864	97.951	carries I-295 (FL)
SR 9B	CR 2209 in St. Johns	I-295 (SR 9A) in Jacksonville	5.508	8.864	Future I-795 (FL)
SR 10	US 90 (SR-16) at Alabama state line	SR A1A in Neptune Beach	394.524	634.925	mostly carries US 90
SR 10A (Pensacola)	US 90/ US 90 Alt. (SR 10) in Beulah	US 90/ US 90 Alt. (SR 10) in Riverview	26.757	43.061	carries US 90
SR 10A (Lake City)	US 90 (SR 10) in Lake City	US 90 (SR 10) in Watertown	3.471	5.586	
SR 10A (Jacksonville)	US 1 / US 17 / US 23 / SR 228 (SR 5 / SR 139) in Jacksonville	SR 10 in Jacksonville	6.498	10.458	unsigned
SR 11	US 17 (SR 15) near DeLand	US 1/ SR 100 (SR 5) in Bunnell	29.793	47.947	
SR 12	SR 20 in Bristol	US 27 (SR 63) in Havana	40.112	64.554	
SR 13	SR 16 in Wards Creek	Riverside Avenue in Jacksonville	32.288	51.962	
SR 14	I-10 (SR 8) near Madison	SR 53 in Madison	3.903	6.281	
SR 15	SR 80 / SR 880 in Belle Glade	US 1 / US 23 / US 301 / SR 4 / SR 15 at Georgia state line	324.180	521.717	mostly carries US 1, US 17, and US 441
SR 15A	US 17 / US 92 (SR 15/ SR 600) in DeLand	US 17 (SR 15) near DeLand	6.899	11.103	
SR 16	SR 121 in Raiford	US 1 Bus. (SR 5A) in St. Augustine	63.616	102.380	
SR 17	US 27 / US 98 (SR 25 / SR 700) in Sebring	US 27 / US 98 (SR 25 / SR 700) in Avon Park	12.206	19.644	
SR 17	US 27 / US 98 (SR 25 / SR 700) near Frostproof	US 17 / US 92 (SR 600) in Haines City	34.880	56.134	
SR 18	SR 121 in Worthington Springs	SR 231 / SR 235 in Brooker	6.600	10.622	
SR 19	SR 33 / SR 50 in Groveland	US 17 (SR 15) in Palatka	88.955	143.159	
SR 20	SR 85 in Niceville	US 1/ SR 100 (SR 5) in Bunnell	358.154	576.393	partly carries US 27
SR 21	SR 20 near McMeekin	US 17 (SR 15) in Jacksonville	57.573	92.655	
SR 22	US 98 Bus. (SR 30) in Springfield	SR 71 in Wewahitchka	25.855	41.610	
SR 23	US 17 near Green Cove Springs	I-10 (SR 8) in Jacksonville	33.600	54.074	
SR 24	2nd Street in Cedar Key	US 301 (SR 200) in Waldo	71.527	115.112	
SR 24A	SR 24 in Gainesville	SR 20 / SR 24 / SR 26 in Gainesville	3.997	6.433	
SR 25	I-195 / US 1 (SR 5 / SR 112) in Miami	US 41 / SR 7 at Georgia state line	411.663	662.507	mostly carries US 27, US 41, and US 441
SR 25A	US 41/ US 441 (SR 25) near Lake City	US 441 (SR 25) in Five Points	4.346	6.994	carries US 441
SR 26	US 19 / US 27 Alt. / US 98 (SR 55) in Fanning Springs	SR 100 in Putnam Hall	62.172	100.056	
SR 26A	SR 26 in Gainesville	SR 26 in Gainesville	1.734	2.791	
SR 29	US 41 (SR 90) in Carnestown	US 27 (SR 25) near Palmdale	75.820	122.020	
SR 30	US-98 (SR-42) at Alabama state line	US 19 / US 27 Alt. / US 98 (SR 55) in Perry	283.214	455.789	mostly carries US 98, US 98 Bus. (Pensacola), and US 98 Bus. (Panama City)
SR 30A	US 98 / SR 30 near Laguna Beach	US 98 / SR 30 near Panama City Beach	13.948	22.447	carries US 98
SR 30A	US 98/ US 98 Bus./ SR 390 (SR 30) in Panama City	US 98/ US 98 Bus. (SR 30) in Parker	9.813	15.792	carries US 98
SR 30A	US 98 (SR 30) near Port St. Joe	SR 30E near Cape San Blas	6.661	10.720	
SR 30E	St. Joseph Peninsula State Park	SR 30A near Cape San Blas	8.716	14.027	
SR 31	SR 80 near Fort Myers Shores	SR 70 near Arcadia	36.357	58.511	
SR 33	US 92 (SR 546) in Lakeland	SR 50 Mascotte	42.687	68.698	
SR 35	US 41 (SR 45) in Punta Gorda	SR 40 in Silver Springs	175.943	283.153	mostly carries US 17, US 98, and US 301
SR 37	SR 62 in Duette	Main Street (SR 35 / SR 600) in Lakeland	34.227	55.083	
SR 39	SR 60 in Hopewell	US 98 / US 301 (SR 35 / SR 700) near Dade City	27.472	44.212	partly carries US 301
SR 40	US 41 (SR 45) in Rainbow Lakes Estates	SR A1A in Ormond Beach	97.832	157.445	
SR 41	US 301 (SR 43) near Tampa	US 301 / SR 39 near Zephyrhills	20.205	32.517	carries US 301
SR 43	US 41 Bus. (SR 45) in Palmetto	US 301 (SR 41) near Tampa	41.492	66.775	mostly carries US 301
SR 44	US 19 / US 98 (SR 55) in Crystal River	US 441 (SR 500) in Leesburg	49.155	79.107	
SR 44	US 441 (SR 500) in Mount Dora	Peninsula Avenue in New Smyrna Beach	53.631	86.311	
SR 44 Bus.	SR 44 in New Smyrna Beach	US 1 (SR 5) in New Smyrna Beach	0.934	1.503	
SR 45	US 41 (SR 90) in Naples	US 41 / US 441 (SR 25) in High Springs	300.547	483.684	mostly carries US 41, US 41 Bus. (Venice), and US 41 Bus. (Tampa)
SR 45A	US 41 / US 41 Bus. (SR 45) near Venice	US 41 / US 41 Bus. (SR 45) in Venice	2.968	4.777	carries US 41
SR 46	US 441 (SR 500) in Mount Dora	US 1 (SR 5) in Mims	52.752	84.896	
SR 47	US 129 (SR 49) in Trenton	US 441 / SR 89 at Georgia state line	71.434	114.962	partly carries US 441
SR 48	I-75 (SR 93) near Bushnell	US 301 (SR 35) in Bushnell	2.167	3.487	
SR 49	US 19 / US 27 Alt. / US 98 (SR 55) in Chiefland	US 27 / US 129 (SR 20) near Branford	34.075	54.838	carries US 129
SR 50	US 19 (SR 55) in Weeki Wachee	US 1 (SR 5) in Titusville	114.269	183.898	
SR 50A	SR 50 in Brooksville	US 98 / SR 50 (SR 700) near Brooksville	3.918	6.305	
SR 51	1st Avenue South in Steinhatchee	US 41 / US 129 / SR 6 (SR 25 / SR 100) in Jasper	70.447	113.373	partly carries US 129
SR 52	US 19 (SR 55) in Bayonet Point	US 98 / US 301 (SR 533) in Dade City	33.403	53.757	
SR 53	I-10 (SR 8) near Madison	SR 333 at Georgia state line	19.170	30.851	
SR 54	US 19 (SR 55) in Elfers	US 301 (SR 39) in Zephyrhills	33.313	53.612	
SR 55	US 41 (SR 684) near Bradenton	US 221 / SR 76 at Georgia state line	259.700	417.947	carries US 19, US 41, and US 221
SR 56	SR 54 in Wesley Chapel	U.S. Route 301 in Zephyrhills	6.732	10.834	
SR 57	US 19 / US 27 (SR 20) in Capps	US 19 / SR 3 / SR 300 at Georgia state line	18.088	29.110	carries US 19
SR 59	US 98 (SR 30) near Newport	US 90 (SR 10) near Lloyd	25.919	41.713	
SR 60	CR 245 in Clearwater Beach	SR A1A in Vero Beach	161.336	259.645	
SR 61	US 98 (SR 30) in Ochlockonee Bay	US 319(FL) / SR 35 at Georgia state line	43.257	69.615	partly carries US 98 and US 319
SR 61A	SR 61 in Tallahassee	SR 363 in Tallahassee	0.103	0.166	
SR 62	US 301 (SR 43) in Parrish	US 17 (SR 35) near Wauchula	37.433	60.243	
SR 63	SR 61 (US 27) in Tallahassee	US 27 / SR 1 at Georgia state line	21.226	34.160	carries US 27
SR 64	Gulf Drive in Holmes Beach	US 27/ US 98/ SR 17 (SR 25) in Avon Park	77.386	124.541	
SR 65	US 98/ US 319 (SR 30) in Green Point	SR 12 near Gretna	71.142	114.492	
SR 66	US 17 (SR 35) in Zolfo Springs	US 27 / US 98 (SR 25 / SR 700) near DeSoto City	25.024	40.272	
SR 68	SR 713 near Fort Pierce	US 1 (SR 5) in Fort Pierce	4.495	7.234	
SR 69	SR 71 in Blountstown	SR 71 in Greenwood	35.226	56.691	
SR 70	US 41 (SR 45) near Bradenton	US 1 (SR 5) in Fort Pierce	148.034	238.238	
SR 70 (spur)	301 Boulevard in Oneco	SR 64 in Bradenton	3.030	4.876	unsigned
SR 71	US 98 (SR 30) in Port St. Joe	SR-53 at Alabama state line	95.360	153.467	
SR 72	SR 758 in Siesta Key	SR 70 near Arcadia	42.559	68.492	
SR 73	SR 71 in Chipola Park	US 231 (SR 75) near Cottondale	49.833	80.198	
SR 75	US 98 Bus. (SR 30) in Panama City	US-231 (SR-1) at Alabama state line	66.591	107.168	carries US 231
SR 76	US 98 / US 441 (SR 15 / SR 700) in Port Mayaca	US 1 (SR 5) in Stuart	31.504	50.701	
SR 77	US 98 Bus. (SR 30) in Panama City	SR-109 at Alabama state line	62.968	101.337	
SR 78	Burnt Store Road / Veterans Parkway in Cape Coral	SR 31 near Fort Myers Shores	18.937	30.476	
SR 78	SR 29 near LaBelle	US 98 / US 441 (SR 15 / SR 700) near Okeechobee	53.080	85.424	
SR 79	SR 30 in Panama City Beach	SR-167 at Alabama state line	60.673	97.644	
SR 80	US 41 Bus. (SR 739) in Fort Myers	SR A1A in Palm Beach	123.480	198.722	partly carries US 27 US 98 US 441
SR 81	SR 20 in Bruce	SR-87 at Alabama state line	39.466	63.514	
SR 82	US 41 (SR 45) in Fort Myers	SR 29 near Immokalee	29.884	48.094	
SR 83	US 98 (SR 30) near Santa Rosa Beach	SR-153 at Alabama state line	45.327	72.947	partly carries US 331
SR 84	US 41 (SR 90) in Naples	SR 951 near Golden Gate	6.464	10.403	
SR 84	I-75 (SR 93) in Weston	Miami Road in Fort Lauderdale	18.29	29.43	
SR 85	US 98 (SR 30) in Fort Walton Beach	SR-55 in Alabama state line	56.486	90.905	
SR 87	US 98 (SR 30) in Navarre	SR-41 at Alabama state line	51.687	83.182	
SR 89	US 90 (SR 10) in Milton	CR-55 at Alabama state line	31.204	50.218	
SR 90	US 41 (SR 45) in Naples	US 1 (SR 5) in Miami	108.285	174.268	carries US 41
SR 91	I-95 / US 441 / SR 9 / SR 826 (SR 7 / SR 9A) in Miami Gardens	I-75 (SR 93) near Wildwood	264.666	425.939	carries Florida's Turnpike
SR 93	SR 826 / SR 924 in Miami Lakes	I-75 (SR 401) at Georgia state line	484.417	779.594	carries I-75 and I-275
SR 93A	I-75 / I-275 (SR 93) near Palmetto	I-75 / I-275 (SR 93) near Wesley Chapel	46.628	75.040	carries I-75
SR 94	SR 997 near The Hammocks	US 1 (SR 5) in Kendall	10.700	17.220	
SR 95	US 90 / US 98 (SR 10A) in Pensacola	US-29 (SR-113) at Alabama state line	43.636	70.225	carries US 29
SR 97	CR 95A in Molino	SR-21 at Alabama state line	22.507	36.222	
SR 99	US 90 in Escambia County	Isaacs Lane in Escambia County	2.586	4.162	
SR 100	US 129 / SR 11 at Georgia state line	SR A1A in Flagler Beach	153.173	246.508	partly carries US 41 and US 129
SR 100A	US 41 in Lake City	US 441 in Lake City	0.363	0.584	signed as SR-100A only between US 41 and US 441. Continued as County 100A
SR 101	SR A1A near Atlantic Beach	Naval Station Mayport	1.209	1.946	
SR 102	Jacksonville International Airport	I-95 (SR 9) in Jacksonville	1.609	2.589	
SR 103	SR 208 in Jacksonville	US 90 (SR 10) in Jacksonville	3.814	6.138	
SR 104	US 1/ US 23 (SR 15) in Jacksonville	US 17 (SR 5) in Jacksonville	7.567	12.178	
SR 105	I-95 (SR 9) in Jacksonville	SR A1A (SR 200) in Fernandina Beach	36.818	59.253	
SR 109	SR 13 in Jacksonville	Jacksonville University	8.707	14.013	
SR 111	SR 21 in Jacksonville	US 17 (SR 5) in Jacksonville	11.875	19.111	
SR 112	Miami International Airport	SR A1A in Miami Beach	9.856	15.862	partly carries I-195
SR 113	SR 115 in Jacksonville	I-295 / SR 116 (SR 9A) in Jacksonville	2.770	4.458	
SR 114	I-95 (SR 9) in Jacksonville	Jacksonville	0.584	0.940	
SR 115	US 1 (SR 5) in Jacksonville	US 1 / US 23 (SR 115) in Callahan	37.199	59.866	partly carries US 1 and US 1 Alt.
SR 115A	Jacksonville Sports Complex	SR 115 (SR 10A / SR 139) in Jacksonville	0.175	0.282	unsigned
SR 115A	US 1 Alt. (SR 228) in Jacksonville	US 1 Alt. (SR 115) in Jacksonville	1.254	2.018	unsigned; carries US 1 Alt.
SR 116	I-295 / SR 113 (SR 9A) in Jacksonville	SR 101 in Wonderwood	9.026	14.526	
SR 117	SR 122 in Jacksonville	I-95/ SR 115 (SR 9) in Jacksonville	1.451	2.335	
SR 120	US 441 (SR 25) in Gainesville	SR 24 in Gainesville	2.544	4.094	
SR 121	US 19 / US 98 (SR 55) in Lebanon Station	SR 23 / SR 121 at Georgia state line	101.867	163.939	
SR 122	I-95 (SR 9) in Jacksonville	US 17 (SR 5) in Jacksonville	1.070	1.722	
SR 123	SR 85 near Niceville	SR 85 at Eglin AFB	5.175	8.328	
SR 126	SR 13 in Jacksonville	US 1 Alt. (SR 228A) in Jacksonville	2.373	3.819	partly carries US 1 Alt.
SR 128	SR 103 in Jacksonville	SR 211 in Jacksonville	2.500	4.023	
SR 129	US 17/ SR 228 (SR 15) in Jacksonville	I-10 (SR 8) in Jacksonville	0.728	1.172	
SR 134	SR 228 in Jacksonville	US 17 (SR 15) in Jacksonville	11.495	18.499	
SR 136	I-75 (SR 93) near Pouchers Corner	US 41 (SR 25 / SR 100) in White Springs	3.396	5.465	
SR 139	SR 115 (SR 115A) in Jacksonville	US 1/ US 23 (SR 15) in Jacksonville	5.154	8.295	partly carries US 23
SR 143	I-75 (SR 93) in Jennings	US 41 (SR 25) in Jennings	1.569	2.525	
SR 145	US 98 (SR 30) in Fort Walton Beach	SR 85 in Fort Walton Beach	0.510	0.821	
SR 145	US 90/ SR 53 (SR 10) in Madison	SR 31 at Georgia state line	13.723	22.085	
SR 152	SR 13 in Jacksonville	I-295 (SR 9A) in Jacksonville	6.417	10.327	
SR 155	SR 61 in Tallahassee	Lakeshore Drive near Tallahassee	2.574	4.142	
SR 159	US 27 (SR 63) in Havana	SR 12 in Havana	0.450	0.724	
SR 160	SR 61 in Tallahassee	US 319 (SR 261) in Tallahassee	0.114	0.183	
SR 162	I-10/ SR 61 (SR 8) in Tallahassee	US 319 (SR 261) in Tallahassee	0.292	0.470	
SR 166	US 90/ SR 73 (SR 10) in Marianna	SR 71 near Marianna	5.054	8.134	
SR 173	NAS Pensacola	SR 297 near Bellview	11.933	19.204	
SR 187	US 90 (SR 10) in DeFuniak Springs	US-331 (SR-9) at Alabama state line	21.565	34.706	carries US 331
SR 188	SR 189 in Wright	SR 85 in Ocean City	2.581	4.154	
SR 189	US 98 (SR 30) in Fort Walton Beach	SR 397 at Eglin AFB	10.523	16.935	
SR 189	SR 4 in Baker	SR-137 at Alabama state line	14.405	23.183	
SR 190	SR 85 at Eglin AFB	SR 397 in Valparaiso	1.227	1.975	
SR 196	Tarragona Street in Pensacola	US 98 (SR 30) in Pensacola	1.009	1.624	
SR 200	US 41 (SR 45) in Hernando	SR A1A (SR 105) in Fernandina Beach	155.816	250.762	partly carries US 301
SR 201	US 301 (SR 200) in Baldwin	US 301 (SR 200) north of Baldwin	3.933	6.330	carries US Bypass 301
SR 202	US 1 (SR 5) in Jacksonville	SR A1A in Jacksonville Beach	13.042	20.989	
SR 206	SR 207 near Spuds	SR A1A in Crescent Beach	14.485	23.311	
SR 207	US 17 / SR 100 (SR 15 / SR 20) in East Palatka	US 1 (SR 5) in St. Augustine	24.430	39.316	
SR 208	I-295 (SR 9A) in Jacksonville	SR 103 in Jacksonville	0.840	1.352	
SR 210	Old Kings Road in Jacksonville	West 13th Street in Jacksonville	6.101	9.819	
SR 211	SR 128 in Jacksonville	Peninsular Place in Jacksonville	3.723	5.992	
SR 212	US 90 / SR 10 in Jacksonville	SR A1A in Jacksonville Beach	14.826	23.860	carries US 90
SR 222	I-75 (SR 93) near Gainesville	SR 26 near Gainesville	14.174	22.811	
SR 223	US 301 (SR 200) south of Starke	US 301 (SR 200) north of Starke	6.489	10.443	carries US Alternate 301
SR 224	SR 21 in Orange Park	US 17 (SR 15) in Orange Park	2.781	4.476	
SR 226	SR 24 in Gainesville	SR 24A/ SR 331 in Gainesville	2.201	3.542	
SR 228	US 90 (SR 10) in Macclenny	US 90 (SR 212) in Jacksonville	32.532	52.355	
SR 228A	US 1 Alt. / SR 126 in Jacksonville	US 1 Alt. (SR 228) in Jacksonville	0.930	1.497	carries US 1 Alt.
SR 230	US 301 (SR 200) in Starke	SR 16 in Kingsley Village	7.379	11.875	
SR 231	SR 235 near LaCrosse	SR 18 in Brooker	3.578	5.758	
SR 231	Reception and Medical Center	SR 238 in Lake Butler	2.739	4.408	
SR 235	Northwest 143rd Place in Alachua	SR 18 in Brooker	14.613	23.517	
SR 238	US 41/ US 441 (SR 25) in Ellisville	SR 100 in Lake Butler	15.459	24.879	
SR 243	I-295 (SR 9A) in Jacksonville	SR 102 in Jacksonville	2.255	3.629	
SR 247	US 129 (SR 249) in Branford	US 90 (SR 10) in Lake City	22.048	35.483	
SR 249	US 27 / US 129 (SR 20) in Branford	US 129 /SR 51 in Live Oak	24.178	38.911	carries US 129
SR 261	US 319 / SR 363 (SR 263) in Tallahassee	US 319 / SR 61 in Tallahassee	11.440	18.411	carries US 319
SR 263	US 319 / SR 363 (SR 261) in Tallahassee	US 27 (SR 63) in Lake Jackson	15.044	24.211	partly carries US 319
SR 265	US 27 (SR 20) in Tallahassee	Seventh Avenue in Tallahassee	1.431	2.303	
SR 267	US 98 (SR 30) in Newport	SR 302 at Georgia state line	59.478	95.721	
SR 269	US 90 (SR 10) in Quincy	SR 12 in Quincy	1.6	2.6	under construction
SR 273	SR 77 in Chipley	US 231 (SR 75) in Campbellton	14.509	23.350	
SR 276	I-10 (SR 8) in Marianna	US 90/ SR 73 (SR 10) in Marianna	3.395	5.464	
SR 277	SR 79 in Vernon	US 90 (SR 10) near Chipley	14.213	22.874	
SR 281	US 98 (SR 30) near Gulf Breeze	US 90 (SR 10) near Milton	15.971	25.703	
SR 285	SR 20 in Niceville	US 90 (SR 10) near Mossy Head	17.864	28.749	
SR 289	US 98/ US 98 Bus. (SR 30) in Pensacola	Olive Road in Ferry Pass	7.281	11.718	partly carries US 98
SR 291	US 98 Bus. (SR 30) in Pensacola	US 90 Alt. (SR 10) in Ferry Pass	8.917	14.351	
SR 292	SR-182 at Alabama state line	US 29 (SR 95) in Brent	23.632	38.032	partly carries US 98
SR 293	US 98 (SR 30) in Destin	SR 85 in Niceville	15.4	24.8	
SR 294	SR 295 in West Pensacola	US 98 (SR 30) in West Pensacola	0.209	0.336	
SR 295	NAS Pensacola	SR 289 in Pensacola	7.992	12.862	
SR 295 (spur)	SR 295 in West Pensacola	US 90 (SR 10A) in West Pensacola	0.482	0.776	
SR 296	US 90 (SR 10A) in Bellview	US 90 (SR 10A) in Pensacola	9.601	15.451	
SR 297	US 90 (SR 10A) in Bellview	US 90 Alt. (SR 10) in Ensley	4.294	6.911	
SR 298	US 98 (SR 30) in Millview	SR 295 (spur) in West Pensacola	6.837	11.003	
SR 300	Gulf Beach Drive on St. George Island	US 98 (SR 30) in Eastpoint	5.579	8.979	
SR 312	SR 207 near St. Augustine	SR A1A in St. Augustine	3.603	5.798	
SR 313					Proposed
SR 320	Manatee Springs State Park	US 19 / US 27 Alt. / US 98 (SR 55) in Chiefland	5.784	9.308	
SR 321	SR 3 in Kennedy Space Center	SR 405 in Kennedy Space Center	2.672	4.300	
SR 326	I-75 (SR 93) near Zuber	SR 40 near Silver Springs	11.577	18.631	
SR 327	SR 368 in Panama City	SR 390 in Pretty Bayou	0.589	0.948	
SR 331	SR 121 in Gainesville	SR 20 / SR 24 / SR 26 in Gainesville	5.434	8.745	
SR 345	Northwest 50th Street in Curryville	US 27 Alt. (SR 500) in Chiefland	7.630	12.279	
SR 349	US 19 / US 27 Alt. / US 98 (SR 55) in Old Town	US 27 (SR 20) near Branford	24.253	39.031	
SR 359A	US 19 / US 27 (SR 20) near Perry	US 221 (SR 55) near Perry	1.346	2.166	
SR 363	Riverside Drive in St. Marks	SR 371 in Tallahassee	20.198	32.506	
SR 366	SR 20 near Tallahassee	SR 371 in Tallahassee	3.161	5.087	
SR 368	US 98 (SR 30) in Panama City	US 231 (SR 75) in Panama City	5.388	8.671	
SR 368A	Gulf Coast State College	SR 368 in Panama City	0.690	1.110	
SR 369	US 319 (SR 61) in Crawfordville	US 319 (SR 61) near Tallahassee	13.040	20.986	carries US 319
SR 371	SR 263 in Tallahassee	SR 366 in Tallahassee	4.430	7.129	
SR 373	SR 371 in Tallahassee	SR 61 in Tallahassee	1.708	2.749	
SR 375	US 319 (SR 377) in Sopchoppy	US 98 / US 319 (SR 30 / SR 61) in Medart	6.450	10.380	carries US 319
SR 377	US 98/ US 319 (SR 30) near Lanark Village	US 319 (SR 375) in Sopchoppy	10.629	17.106	carries US 319
SR 388	SR 79 in West Bay	SR 77 in Vicksburg	12.339	19.858	
SR 389	US 98 Bus. (SR 30) in Panama City	US 231 (SR 75) in Hiland Park	3.030	4.876	
SR 390	US 98 / US 98 Bus. (SR 30 / SR 30A) in Panama City	SR 77 in Lynn Haven	5.856	9.424	
SR 391	US 98 / US 231 (SR 30A / SR 75) in Panama City	SR 390 in Pretty Bayou	2.273	3.658	
SR 392A	SR 30 in Panama City Beach	SR 30 in Panama City Beach	3.117	5.016	
SR 393	US 98 (SR 30) in Mary Esther	SR 189 in Wright	1.833	2.950	
SR 397	SR 85 in Eglin AFB	SR 85 in Niceville	3.175	5.110	gap through Eglin AFB
SR 399	CR 399 (Bob Sikes Bridge)	US 98 (SR 30) in Gulf Breeze	0.319	0.513	
SR 400	I-275 (SR 93) in Tampa	US 1 (SR 5) in Daytona Beach	136.116	219.057	mostly carries I-4
SR 401	SR A1A / SR 528 near Cape Canaveral	Cape Canaveral Space Force Station	2.200	3.541	
SR 404	US 1 (SR 5) near Palm Shores	SR A1A in South Patrick Shores	4.139	6.661	
SR 405	SR 321 in Kennedy Space Center	US 1 (SR 5) in Titusville	10.108	16.267	
SR 406	I-95 (SR 9) in Titusville	US 1 (SR 5) in Titusville	2.949	4.746	
SR 407	SR 528 near Titusville	SR 405 in Titusville	6.797	10.939	
SR 408	Turnpike (SR 91) in Gotha	SR 50 near Bithlo	22.107	35.578	
SR 414	US 441 (SR 500) in Apopka	US 17 / US 92 (SR 15 / SR 600) in Maitland	15.837	25.487	
SR 415	SR 46 in Sanford	SR 44 in Samsula	18.487	29.752	
SR 416	SR 438 in Orlando	US 441 (SR 500) in Orlando	1.737	2.795	
SR 417	I-4 (SR 400) in Celebration	I-4 (SR 400) / SR 429 in Sanford	54.061	87.003	
SR 419	SR 426 / SR 434 in Oviedo	US 17 / US 92 (SR 15 / SR 600) in Winter Springs	9.330	15.015	
SR 421	I-95 (SR 9) in Port Orange	US 1/ SR A1A (SR 5) in Port Orange	4.001	6.439	
SR 423	Church Street in Orlando	US 17 / US 92 (SR 15 / SR 600) in Winter Park	7.533	12.123	
SR 424	SR 434 near Lockhart	Par Street in Orlando	2.582	4.155	
SR 426	SR 424 in Fairview Shores	SR 419 / SR 434 in Oviedo	14.532	23.387	
SR 429	I-4 (SR 400) near Disney World	I-4 (SR 400) / SR 417 in Sanford	52.776	84.935	
SR 430	SR 483 in Daytona Beach	SR A1A in Daytona Beach	3.353	5.396	
SR 434	SR 423 in Orlando	SR 50 near Bithlo	28.490	45.850	
SR 435	SR 482 in Orlando	SR 50 in Pine Hills	7.101	11.428	
SR 436	US 441 (SR 500) in Apopka	SR 528 at Orlando International Airport	25.532	41.090	
SR 437	SR 438 in Ocoee	SR 438 in Ocoee	0.106	0.171	completely overlaps SR 438
SR 438	SR 429 in Ocoee	Rio Grande Avenue in Orlando	10.144	16.325	
SR 441	SR A1A in Daytona Beach Shores	US 92 (SR 600) in Daytona Beach	5.409	8.705	
SR 442	I-95 (SR 9) in Edgewater	US 1 (SR 5) in Edgewater	3.780	6.083	
SR 451	SR 414/ SR 429 in Apopka	US 441 (SR 500) in Apopka	1.868	3.006	
SR 453	SR 429 in Apopka	SR 46 in Mount Dora	3.360	5.407	
SR 464	SR 200 in Ocala	SR 35 near Silver Springs Shores	7.213	11.608	
SR 471	US 98 (SR 35 / SR 700) near Branchborough	US 301 (SR 35) near Sumterville	34.909	56.181	
SR 472	US 17 / US 92 (SR 15 / SR 600) near DeLand	I-4 (SR 400) in Deltona	3.406	5.481	
SR 482	I-4 (SR 400) near Dr. Phillips	SR 528 in Belle Isle	7.813	12.574	
SR 483	SR 400 in Daytona Beach	SR 430 in Daytona Beach	3.377	5.435	
SR 492	US 27/ US 301/ US 441 (SR 25/ SR 200/ SR 500) in Ocala	SR 40 in Ocala	3.737	6.014	
SR 500	SR A1A in Indialantic	US 19 / US 27 Alt. / US 98 (SR 55) in Chiefland	197.949	318.568	carries US 27, US 27 Alt., US 192, and US 441
SR 500A	SR 19 in Tavares	US 441 (SR 500) in Tavares	0.270	0.435	
SR 501	SR 520 near Cocoa	SR 524 in Cocoa	3.358	5.404	
SR 507	SR 514 in Palm Bay	US 192 (SR 500) in Melbourne	5.528	8.896	
SR 508	Melbourne International Airport	US 1 (SR 5) in Melbourne	1.364	2.195	
SR 510	US 1 (SR 5) in Wabasso	SR A1A in Wabasso Beach	2.606	4.194	
SR 513	SR 518 in Melbourne	SR 404 at Patrick Space Force Base	5.253	8.454	
SR 514	I-95 (SR 9) in Palm Bay	US 1 (SR 5) in Malabar	4.262	6.859	
SR 516	US 27 near Lake Louisa State Park	SR 429 in Horizon West	4.400	7.081	currently under construction
SR 517	US 92 (SR 600) in Lakeland	US 92 / SR 546 near Lakeland	0.912	1.468	carries US 92
SR 518	I-95 (SR 9) near Melbourne	SR A1A in Indian Harbour Beach	8.099	13.034	
SR 519	I-95 (SR 9) in Rockledge	SR 520 in Cocoa	4.604	7.409	
SR 520	SR 50 near Bithlo	SR A1A in Cocoa Beach	34.522	55.558	
SR 524	SR 520 near Cocoa	SR 528 in Cocoa	5.130	8.256	
SR 525	US 27 (SR 25) in Leesburg	US 27/ US 441 (SR 500) in Leesburg	0.101	0.163	carries US 27
SR 526	US 17 / US 92 / US 441 (SR 500 / SR 600) in Orlando	Maguire Boulevard / Crystal Lake Drive in Orlando	3.306	5.320	
SR 527	SR 482 near Belle Isle	US 17 / US 92 (SR 15 / SR 600) in Winter Park	8.208	13.209	
SR 528	I-4 (SR 400) near Lake Buena Vista	SR A1A / SR 401 near Cape Canaveral	53.499	86.098	
SR 530	US 27 (SR 25) in Four Corners	US 17 / US 92 / US 192 / US 441 (SR 500 / SR 600) in Kissimmee	18.123	29.166	carries US 192
SR 533	US 98 / US 301 (SR 35 / SR 700) in Dade City	US 98 / US 301 (SR 35 / SR 700) in Dade City	1.602	2.578	carries US 98 / US 301
SR 535	US 192 (SR 530) near Kissimmee	I-4 (SR 400) in Lake Buena Vista	3.620	5.826	
SR 536	I-4 (SR 400) at Disney World	SR 535 near Kissimmee	2.034	3.273	
SR 538	Polk-Osceola county line	CR 580 in Poinciana	7.2	11.6	Extension under construction
SR 539	SR 563 in Lakeland	I-4 (SR 400) in Lakeland	2.516	4.049	
SR 540	US 98 (SR 35/ SR 700) near Lakeland	US 27 (SR 25) near Waverly	17.669	28.435	
SR 542	SR 549 in Winter Haven	US 27 (SR 25) in Dundee	5.958	9.588	
SR 544	US 92 (SR 600) in Auburndale	SR 17 in Haines City	11.647	18.744	
SR 546	I-4 (SR 400) in Lakeland	US 92 (SR 600) in Lakeland	5.755	9.262	mostly carries US 92
SR 548	Sloan Avenue (SR 600) in Lakeland	US 98 (SR 35 / SR 600) in Lakeland	1.809	2.911	
SR 549	SR 542 in Winter Haven	SR 544 in Winter Haven	1.531	2.464	
SR 551	SR 15 in Orlando	SR 426 in Goldenrod	8.785	14.138	
SR 552	SR 15 in Orlando	SR 551 near Azalea Park	2.639	4.247	
SR 553	US 92 (SR 600) in Plant City	I-4 (SR 400) in Plant City	1.410	2.269	
SR 555	US 17 / US 98 (SR 35 / SR 700) in Bartow	US 17 / US 92 (SR 600) in Lake Alfred	14.911	23.997	carries US 17
SR 557	CR 557 near Lake Alfred	Old Grade Road near Lake Alfred	0.499	0.803	only exists within the limits of the I-4 (SR 400) interchange
SR 559	SR 655 in Auburndale	SR 33 in Polk City	10.921	17.576	
SR 559A	CR 655 in Auburndale	SR 559 in Auburndale	1.563	2.515	
SR 563	SR 570 in Lakeland	US 92 (SR 546) in Lakeland	4.912	7.905	
SR 566	I-4 (SR 400) in Plant City	US 92 (SR 600) in Plant City	0.925	1.489	
SR 568	SR 589 near Citrus Park	SR 597 near Lutz	3.036	4.886	
SR 569	SR 60 in Tampa	US 41 (SR 599) in Tampa	1.331	2.142	
SR 570	I-4 (SR 400) in Lakeland	I-4 (SR 400) in Polk City	24.380	39.236	
SR 570B	SR 570 in Lakeland	SR 60 in Bartow			Under Construction
SR 572	US 92 (SR 600) in Lakeland	SR 570 in Lakeland	4.674	7.522	
SR 573	MacDill AFB	US 92 (SR 600) in Tampa	1.842	2.964	
SR 574	US 92 (SR 600) in Tampa	US 92 (SR 600) in Plant City	23.044	37.086	
SR 575	US 301 (SR 35) in Trilacoochee	Withlacoochee River near Lacoochee	2.241	3.607	
SR 579	US 41 Bus. (SR 685) near Tampa	US 41 (SR 45) near Tampa	0.499	0.803	
SR 580	US 19 Alt. (SR 595) in Dunedin	SR 583 in Temple Terrace	28.779	46.315	
SR 581	SR 56 in Wesley Chapel	SR 54 in Wesley Chapel	3.505	5.641	
SR 582	US 41 Bus. (SR 685) in Tampa	US 301 (SR 41) near Thonotosassa	7.829	12.600	
SR 583	US 41 (SR 599) in Tampa	SR 582 in Temple Terrace	6.014	9.679	
SR 584	SR 586 in Oldsmar	SR 580 in Oldsmar	2.135	3.436	
SR 585	US 41 Bus. / SR 60 (SR 45) in Tampa	US 41 / US 92 (SR 600) in Tampa	2.782	4.477	
SR 586	US 19 Alt. (SR 595) in Dunedin	SR 584 in Oldsmar	5.332	8.581	
SR 589	I-275 (SR-93) in Tampa	CR 486 near Lecanto	70	110	
SR 590	US 19 Alt. (SR 595) in Clearwater	SR 580 in Safety Harbor	8.154	13.123	gap in Safety Harbor
SR 592	I-275 (SR 93) in St. Petersburg	SR 595 in St. Petersburg	1.220	1.963	carries I-375
SR 594	I-275 (SR 93) in St. Petersburg	SR 687 in St. Petersburg	1.372	2.208	mostly carries I-175
SR 595	US 92 / SR 687 in St. Petersburg	US 19 (SR 55) in Holiday	37.114	59.729	mostly carries US 19 Alt.
SR 597	SR 580 near Citrus Park	US 41 (SR 45) in Land o' Lakes	10.969	17.653	
SR 599	US 41 / US 41 Bus. / SR 676 (SR 45) near Tampa	US 41 / US 92 (SR 600) in Tampa	5.625	9.053	carries US 41
SR 600	US 92 / SR 686 / SR 687 / SR 694 in St. Petersburg	SR A1A in Daytona Beach	171.732	276.376	mostly carries US 92
SR 607	SR 614 near Lakewood Park	Lakewood Park	2.525	4.064	
SR 608	SR 615 near St. Lucie Village	US 1 near St. Lucie Village	0.569	0.916	
SR 614	I-95 (SR 9) near Lakewood Park	SR 713 in Lakewood Park	3.584	5.768	
SR 615	Edwards Road near Fort Pierce	US 1 (SR 5) near St. Lucie Village	6.168	9.926	
SR 616	SR 60 in Tampa	US 92 (SR 600) in Tampa	2.702	4.348	
SR 618	US 92 (SR 600) in Tampa	I-75 (SR 93) near Brandon	14.132	22.743	
SR 618A	Channelside Drive in Tampa	SR 60 in Brandon	10.766	17.326	reversible express lanes
SR 620	SR 540 in Winter Haven	SR 655 in Winter Haven	0.410	0.660	
SR 636	US 17 (SR 35) in Wauchula	SR 64 near Lemon Grove	6.969	11.216	
SR 651	US 19 Alt. / SR 686 (SR 595) in Largo	SR 60 in Clearwater	3.798	6.112	completely overlaps SR 60 and SR 595
SR 655	US 17 (SR 555) in Eloise	US 92 (SR 600) in Auburndale	7.147	11.502	
SR 656	US 1 (SR 5) in Vero Beach	SR A1A in Vero Beach	1.978	3.183	
SR 659	US 98 (SR 35 / SR 700) in Eaton Park	SR 33 in Lakeland	7.625	12.271	
SR 666	SR 699 in Madeira Beach	US 19 Alt. (SR 595) in Seminole	1.391	2.239	
SR 674	US 41 (SR 45) in Ruskin	SR 37 near Bradley Junction	25.509	41.053	
SR 676	US 41 / US 41 Bus. (SR 45 / SR 599) near Tampa	US 301 (SR 43) near Brandon	3.189	5.132	
SR 678	US 41 Bus. (SR 685) near Tampa	US 41 (SR 45) near Tampa	0.501	0.806	
SR 679	Fort De Soto Park	SR 682 in St. Petersburg	4.816	7.751	
SR 681	US 41 (SR 45) in Nokomis	I-75 (SR 93) near Sarasota	4.142	6.666	
SR 682	SR 699 in St. Pete Beach	I-275 / US 19 (SR 55 / SR 93) in St. Petersburg	3.721	5.988	
SR 683	US 41 (SR 45) in Sarasota	US 41 / US 301 (SR 55) in Bradenton	12.092	19.460	carries US 301
SR 684	SR 789 in Bradenton Beach	US 41 (SR 45) near Bradenton	8.499	13.678	partly carries US 41
SR 685	US 92 (SR 600) in Tampa	US 41 (SR 45) in Lutz	14.683	23.630	mostly carries US 41 Bus.
SR 686	US 19 Alt. (SR 595) in Largo	US 92 / SR 687 / SR 694 (SR 600) in St. Petersburg	10.823	17.418	East Bay Dr./Roosevelt Blvd.
SR 686A	(CR 611 /Bayside Bridge) / SR 686 in Largo	SR 690 in Pinellas Park	2.800	4.506	Segment of Gateway Expressway
SR 687	I-175 / SR 594 in St. Petersburg	I-275 (SR 93) in St. Petersburg	9.446	15.202	
SR 688	SR 699 in Indian Rocks Beach	I-275 (SR 93) in St. Petersburg	12.913	20.781	Ulmerton Road, Walsingham Road, 5th Avenue
SR 690	US 19 (SR 55) in Pinellas Park	I-275 (SR 93) in St. Petersburg	3.319	5.341	
SR 693	SR 699 in St. Pete Beach	US 19 (SR 55) in Largo	11.634	18.723	66th Street N, Pasadena Avenue, Corey Causeway, 75th Avenue
SR 694	SR 693 in Pinellas Park	US 92 / SR 686 / SR 687 (SR 600) in St. Petersburg	6.023	9.693	
SR 699	SR 682 in St. Pete Beach	SR 688 in Indian Rocks Beach	14.604	23.503	Gulf Boulevard, Blind Pass Road, 75th Avenue
SR 700	US 19 / US 98 (SR 55) near Homosassa Springs	US 98 / US 441 / SR 80 near Twenty Mile Bend	224.021	360.527	mostly carries US 98
SR 700 (spur)	US 41 (SR 45) in Brooksville	US 98 / SR 50A (SR 700) in Brooksville	0.330	0.531	
SR 704	SR 7 in Royal Palm Beach	SR A1A in Palm Beach	10.199	16.414	
SR 706	Turnpike (SR 91) in Jupiter	US 1 (SR 5) in Jupiter	4.778	7.689	
SR 708	SR 710 in Riviera Beach	US 1/ SR A1A (SR 5) in Riviera Beach	3.682	5.926	
SR 710	SR 70 near Okeechobee	Old Dixie Highway in Riviera Beach	56.871	91.525	
SR 713	Turnpike / SR 70 (SR 91) in Fort Pierce	US 1 (SR 5) near Lakewood Park	10.198	16.412	
SR 714	I-95 (SR 9) near Palm City	SR A1A in Stuart	12.384	19.930	
SR 715	SR 80 in Belle Glade	US 98/ US 441 (SR 15) in Pahokee	12.072	19.428	
SR 716	Turnpike (SR 91) in Port St. Lucie	US 1 (SR 5) in Port St. Lucie	4.355	7.009	
SR 717	SR 880 in Belle Glade	SR 715 in Belle Glade	1.714	2.758	
SR 727	SR 292 in Beach Haven	SR 295 in West Pensacola	6.755	10.871	
SR 729	US 98/ US 441 (SR 15) in Pahokee	US 98/ US 441 (SR 15) in Pahokee	2.290	3.685	
SR 732	US 1 (SR 5) in Jensen Beach	SR A1A in Jensen Beach	4.111	6.616	
SR 736	US 441 (SR 7) in Fort Lauderdale	US 1 (SR 5) in Fort Lauderdale	4.033	6.490	
SR 739	US 41 (SR 45) near San Carlos Park	US 41 (SR 45) near Cape Coral	16.951	27.280	partly carries US 41 Bus.
SR 742	US 29 (SR 95) in Brent	US 90 (SR 10A) in Pensacola	6.886	11.082	
SR 750	US 29 (SR 95) in Brent	Pensacola International Airport	3.273	5.267	
SR 752	SR 295 in Goulding	SR 289 in Pensacola	1.182	1.902	
SR 758	US 41 (SR 75) near Sarasota	I-75 (SR 93) near Bee Ridge	5.432	8.742	
SR 776	US 41 (SR 45) near South Venice	US 41 (SR 45) in Murdock	24.689	39.733	
SR 777	I-75 (SR 93) near North Port	US 41 (SR 75) in North Port	5.819	9.365	
SR 780	US 301 (SR 683) in Sarasota	I-75 (SR 93) in Fruitville	5.636	9.070	
SR 786	SR 710 in Palm Beach Gardens	US 1/ SR A1A (SR 5) in Palm Beach Gardens	8.647	13.916	
SR 789	US 41 (SR 45) in Sarasota	SR 64 in Holmes Beach	17.616	28.350	
SR 794	SR 809 in Boca Raton	US 1 (SR 5) in Boca Raton	2.780	4.474	
SR 800	US 1 (SR 5) in Boca Raton	SR A1A in Boca Raton	0.574	0.924	
SR 802	US 441 (SR 7) in Wycliffe	SR A1A in Lake Worth	10.313	16.597	
SR 804	US 441 (SR 7) near Wellington	SR A1A in Ocean Ridge	9.870	15.884	
SR 805	US 1/ SR 5 in Lantana	US 1 (SR 5) in West Palm Beach	6.844	11.014	carries US 1
SR 806	US 441 (SR 7) in West Delray Beach	SR A1A in Delray Beach	8.868	14.272	
SR 807	SR 802 in Palm Springs	US 98 / SR 80 in Glen Ridge	4.809	7.739	
SR 808	US 441 (SR 7) in Mission Bay	US 1 (SR 5) in Boca Raton	7.615	12.255	
SR 809	SR 802 in Greenacres	SR 786 in Palm Beach Gardens	15.202	24.465	
SR 810	US 441 (SR 7) in Coconut Creek	SR A1A in Deerfield Beach	7.823	12.590	
SR 811	SR 838 in Fort Lauderdale	SR 810 in Deerfield Beach	13.124	21.121	
SR 811	SR 850 in North Palm Beach	US 1 (SR 5) in Jupiter	10.457	16.829	
SR 812	SR 715 near Belle Glade	US 98/ US 441/ SR 80 (SR 15) near Belle Glade	1.054	1.696	
SR 813					Proposed
SR 814	US 441 (SR 7) in Margate	SR A1A in Pompano Beach	7.124	11.465	
SR 816	SR 817 in Sunrise	SR A1A in Fort Lauderdale	9.720	15.643	
SR 817	SR 9 in Opa-locka	SR 834 in Coral Springs	25.869	41.632	
SR 818	SR 823 in Cooper City	US 1 (SR 5) near Dania Beach	10.745	17.292	
SR 820	US 27 (SR 25) in Pembroke Pines	SR A1A in Hollywood	18.699	30.093	
SR 821	US 1 (SR 5) in Florida City	Florida's Turnpike (SR 91) in Miramar	47.856	77.017	carries Homestead Extension of Florida's Turnpike
SR 822	US 441 (SR 7) in Hollywood	SR A1A in Hollywood	5.792	9.321	
SR 823	US 27 (SR 25) in Hialeah	I-595 / SR 84 (SR 862) in Davie	20.210	32.525	
SR 824	SR 817 in Miramar / Pembroke Pines	US 1 (SR 5) in Hallandale Beach / Hollywood	6.547	10.536	
SR 825	Kendall-Tamiami Airport	SR 94 near Kendall	2.544	4.094	
SR 825	US 41 (SR 90) in Tamiami	SR 836 in Tamiami	1.470	2.366	
SR 826	US 1 (SR 5) in Kendall	SR A1A in Sunny Isles Beach	29.937	48.179	
SR 834	SR 817 in Coral Springs	US 1 (SR 5) in Pompano Beach	9.491	15.274	
SR 836	SR 825 in Tamiami	US 1/ SR A1A (SR 5) in Miami	15.387	24.763	partly carries I-395
SR 838	SR 817 in Plantation	SR A1A in Fort Lauderdale	10.202	16.419	
SR 842	SR 817 in Plantation	US 1 in Fort Lauderdale	7.166	11.533	
SR 844	US 1 (SR 5) in Pompano Beach	SR A1A in Pompano Beach	0.902	1.452	
SR 845	SR 838 in Fort Lauderdale	SR 802 in Greenacres	16.314	26.255	
SR 847	SR 860 in Miami Gardens	Broward County line	2.144	3.450	
SR 848	SR 817 in Davie	US 1 (SR 5) in Dania Beach	6.726	10.824	
SR 849	SR 814 in Pompano Beach	Florida's Turnpike (SR 91) in Pompano Beach	0.957	1.540	
SR 850	SR 811 / CR 811 in North Palm Beach	US 1 in North Palm Beach	1.245	2.004	
SR 852	SR 817 in Miami Gardens / Miramar	US 441 (SR 7) in Miami Gardens / Miramar	2.534	4.078	
SR 856	US 1 (SR 5) in Aventura	SR A1A in Sunny Isles Beach	1.704	2.742	
SR 858	US 441 (SR 7) in West Park	SR A1A in Hallandale Beach	5.429	8.737	
SR 860	I-75 (SR 93) near Miami Gardens	US 1 (SR 5) in Aventura	12.975	20.881	
SR 862	I-75 / SR 869 (SR 93) in Sunrise	US 1 (SR A1A/ SR 5) near Fort Lauderdale	12.860	20.696	carries I-595
SR 864	I-75 (SR 93) in Lee County	Southwest Florida International Airport	1.174	1.889	
SR 865	Fifth Street in Fort Myers Beach	SR 867 in Iona	4.641	7.469	
SR 865	US 41 (SR 45) near Fort Myers	SR 739 near Fort Myers	1.156	1.860	
SR 867	SR 865 in Iona	Colonial Boulevard in Fort Myers	6.622	10.657	
SR 869	I-75 / I-595 (SR 93 / SR 862) in Sunrise	I-95 (SR 9) in Deerfield Beach	23.987	38.603	
SR 870	SR 817 in Lauderhill / Tamarac	SR A1A in Lauderdale-by-the-Sea	12.493	20.106	
SR 874	Turnpike Extension (SR 821) in Three Lakes	SR 826 in Glenvar Heights	7.034	11.320	
SR 876	I-75 (SR 93) near Fort Myers	rest area entrance	0.513	0.826	
SR 878	SR 874 in Kendall	US 1 (SR 5) near South Miami	2.658	4.278	
SR 880	SR 15 / SR 80 in Belle Glade	SR 717 in Belle Glade	0.475	0.764	
SR 882	US 441 (SR 7) in Wellington	US 1 (SR 5) in West Palm Beach	9.233	14.859	
SR 884	US 41 (SR 45) in Fort Myers	I-75 (SR 93) in Fort Myers	5.289	8.512	
SR 886	US 1 (SR 5) in Miami	Port of Miami	0.826	1.329	
SR 887	I-395 in Miami	Port of Miami	0.750	1.207	Port Miami Tunnel
SR 907	SR A1A in Miami Beach	SR A1A in Miami Beach	5.659	9.107	
SR 907A	SR 907 in Miami Beach	SR 907 in Miami Beach	0.408	0.657	
SR 909	SR 924 near Miami Shores	SR 826 in North Miami Beach	3.683	5.927	
SR 913	Rickenbacker Causeway in Miami	I-95 (SR 9A) in Miami	0.373	0.600	
SR 915	US 1 (SR 5) in Miami Shores	I-95 / SR 860 (SR 9) in North Miami Beach	5.867	9.442	
SR 916	SR 826 in Hialeah / Miami Lakes	US 1 (SR 5) in North Miami	10.253	16.501	
SR 922	US 441 (SR 7) in North Miami	SR A1A in Surfside / Bal Harbour	4.743	7.633	
SR 924	I-75 / SR 826 (SR 93) in Miami Lakes	SR 909 near North Miami	8.490	13.663	
SR 932	US 27 (SR 25) in Hialeah Gardens	SR 915 in Miami Shores	9.700	15.611	
SR 933	SR 972 in Miami	SR 112 in Miami	4.245	6.832	
SR 934	SR 826 in Medley	SR A1A in Miami Beach	13.112	21.102	
SR 944	US 27 (SR 25) in Hialeah	US 1 (SR 5) in Miami	5.822	9.370	
SR 948	SR 826 near Doral	US 27 (SR 25) in Hialeah	3.998	6.434	
SR 951	Marco Island	US 41 (SR 90) near Naples Manor	7.072	11.381	
SR 951	SR 84 near Naples	I-75 (SR 93) near Golden Gate	0.638	1.027	
SR 953	US 1 (SR 5) in Coral Gables	SR 916 in Opa-locka	11.735	18.886	
SR 959	US 1 (SR 5) in Coral Gables / South Miami	SR 836 at Miami International Airport	5.381	8.660	
SR 968	SR 973 in Fontainebleau	West 2nd Avenue in Miami	8.699	14.000	
SR 969	SR 968 in Miami	SR 934 near Medley	5.228	8.414	
SR 970	I-95 (SR 9A) in Miami	US 1 (SR 5) in Miami	0.563	0.906	
SR 972	Douglas Road in Coral Gables	US 1 (SR 5) in Miami	4.164	6.701	
SR 973	US 1 (SR 5) in Kendall	SR 836 near Doral	9.505	15.297	
SR 976	Turnpike Extension (SR 821) near Kendall	US 1 (SR 5) in Miami	8.466	13.625	
SR 985	SR 874 / SR 990 in Kendall	SR 836 near Doral	7.604	12.237	
SR 986	Kendale Lakes	Southwest 69th Avenue in South Miami	4.895	7.878	
SR 989	Turnpike Extension (SR 821) in Princeton	US 1 (SR 5) in Cutler Bay	3.032	4.880	
SR 990	SR 874 / SR 985 in Kendall	US 1 (SR 5) in Pinecrest	2.970	4.780	
SR 992	Turnpike Extension (SR 821) in Three Lakes	US 1 (SR 5) in Palmetto Bay	2.642	4.252	
SR 994	SR 997 in Redland	US 1 (SR 5) in Cutler Bay	8.058	12.968	
SR 997	US 1 (SR 5) in Florida City	US 27 (SR 25) near Miramar	36.705	59.071	
SR 998	US 1 (SR 5) in Homestead	SR 997 in Homestead	0.774	1.246	
SR 5054	SR 518 in Melbourne	Wickham Road in Melbourne	1.384	2.227	
SR 9336	Everglades National Park	US 1 (SR 5) in Florida City	8.745	14.074	

== Truck routes ==
These routes are partially signed over locally maintained roads.

- Florida State Road 14 Truck, Madison
- Florida State Road 29 Truck, LaBelle
- Florida State Road 39, Plant City
- Florida State Road 230, Starke
