= Florida State Road 85 =

State highway in Florida, United States

State Road 85
- SR 85 highlighted in red

Route information
- Maintained by FDOT
- Length: 56.486 mi (90.905 km)
- Existed: 1945 renumbering (definition)–present

Major junctions
- South end: US 98 in Fort Walton Beach
- SR 20 in Niceville; I-10 in Crestview; US 90 in Crestview
- North end: SR 55 in Florala, AL

Location
- Country: United States
- State: Florida
- Counties: Okaloosa, Walton

Highway system
- Florida State Highway System; Interstate; US; State; Former; Pre‑1945; Toll; Scenic
← SR 84	→ SR 87

State Road 85 (SR 85) is a north–south state highway that runs from US 98 in Fort Walton Beach, Florida north to State Route 55 at the Florida/Alabama state line. In its earliest inception, it was just a clayed road over graded sandy soil, and was known early in the twentieth century as the Georgia, Alabama and Florida Highway.

== Route description ==
From its southern terminus at the intersection of US 98 in downtown Fort Walton Beach to Shalimar, Florida, SR 85 is a six-lane highway with turn medians, accessing local beaches and Eglin Air Force Base. The road, known as Eglin Parkway, runs north through Fort Walton Beach, and the town of Cinco Bayou before crossing the namesake Cinco Bayou Bridge, and then through the Ocean City area of Fort Walton Beach. It crosses Garniers Bayou into Shalimar, and thence north onto the Eglin reservation where it becomes a four-lane route with grass median. It then skirts the northwest side of Eglin Air Force Base Main Base, with a grade separated interchange for State Road 123 and Northwest Florida Regional Airport, continuing as a four-lane divided highway with a 65 mph (105 km/h) speed limit. A former railroad grade crossing just south of the commercial terminal was removed when the south end of the Eglin Base Railroad was abandoned in the 1980s. Looping through Valparaiso as Government Avenue and the John Sims Parkway into Niceville, SR 85 turns north at the intersection with State Road 20, passing College Boulevard, another removed Eglin AFB railroad grade crossing, and the intersection with State Road 293 Mid-Bay Bridge Connector. Continuing north, there is an interchange with the northern terminus of State Road 123. SR 85 continues north through a grade-separated intersection at 77th Special Forces Way, serving the cantonment for the 7th Special Forces Group and Duke Field. The road continues north, reaching the Crestview city limits and becoming a divided highway. At this point, the road encounters a series of restaurants, motels, gas stations, and other travel facilities ahead of the diamond interchange with I-10 at exit 56. The road continues through Crestview, the Okaloosa County seat, intersecting U.S. Route 90, the Old Spanish Trail, and continues north towards its terminus at the Alabama state line, where it continues north as SR 55 towards Florala. North of the community of Auburn to the Alabama line State Road 85 is a two-lane rural highway. Just south of Laurel Hill, the road crosses on a bridge the abandoned alignment of the former Louisville and Nashville Railroad Yellow River branch that paralleled 85 between Crestview and Florala, Alabama.

== History ==
Between 1923 and 1945, State Road 85 consisted of two different routes. The southern segment was the original SR 33 between Fort Walton Beach and Crestview in Okaloosa County. The northern segment was the original SR 54 between Crestview in Okaloosa County and crossed the Walton County line before being replaced by Alabama State Route 55 at the Florida-Alabama State Line.

== Future ==
Plans are to expand the section of highway between Auburn and the Alabama state line to four lanes once Alabama completes their State Route 55 expansion to four lanes from south of Andalusia, Alabama to Florala, Alabama. This will provide both a better hurricane evacuation route from Okaloosa County as well as a more direct route to Destin, Florida and Fort Walton Beach, Florida from Interstate 65.

== Major intersections ==
County	Location	mi	km	Destinations	Notes
Okaloosa	Fort Walton Beach	0.000	0.000	US 98 (Miracle Strip Parkway / SR 30) – Destin, Pensacola	Southern terminus
Okaloosa	Fort Walton Beach	0.607	0.977	SR 145 south (Perry Avenue)	Northern terminus of SR 145
Okaloosa	Ocean City	3.039	4.891	SR 188 west (Racetrack Road)	Eastern terminus of SR 188
Okaloosa	Eglin AFB	5.518	8.880	CR 85B west (Sunset Lane)	
Okaloosa	Eglin AFB	5.97	9.61	SR 397 north – Eglin AFB	interchange; northbound exit and southbound entrance
Okaloosa	Eglin AFB	6.473	10.417	SR 189 – Eglin AFB, Wright, Fairgrounds, University of Florida Research & Engineering Education Facility	
Okaloosa	Eglin AFB	7.752	12.476	General Bond Boulevard - Hurlburt Field	
Okaloosa	Eglin AFB	8.55	13.76	SR 123 north to I-10 – Crestview	interchange
Okaloosa	Eglin AFB	9.13	14.69	Northwest Florida Regional Airport	interchange
Okaloosa	Eglin AFB	11.476	18.469	SR 190 east – Valparaiso	Western terminus of SR 190
Okaloosa	Niceville	12.251	19.716	SR 397 south (John Sims Parkway) – Eglin AFB	Northern terminus of SR 397
Okaloosa	Niceville	12.895	20.752	SR 20 east (John Sims Parkway) to SR 293 – Destin, Tallahassee, Bunnell	Western terminus of SR 20
Okaloosa	Niceville	13.782	22.180	CR 190 east (College Boulevard)	
Okaloosa	Niceville	14.5	23.3	SR 293 south – Mid-Bay Bridge	Northern terminus of SR 293
Okaloosa	Eglin AFB	16.966	27.304	SR 123 south – Fort Walton, Destin, Northwest Florida Regional Airport, Eglin AFB, Hurlburt Field	Northern terminus of SR 123
Okaloosa	Eglin AFB	22.42	36.08	McWhorter Avenue, 77th Special Forces Way (SR 210)	interchange
Okaloosa	Crestview	27.635	44.474	P.J. Adams Parkway	to CR 4
Okaloosa	Crestview	28.62	46.06	I-10 (SR 8) – Pensacola, Tallahassee	Exit 56 (I-10)
Okaloosa	Crestview	31.286	50.350	US 90 (SR 10) – Milligan, Mossy Head, Downtown Crestview, National Guard Armory	
Okaloosa	Crestview	33.710	54.251	CR 188 (Airport Road / Old Bethel Road) – Bob Sikes Airport	
Okaloosa		38.268	61.586	CR 85A north (Bill Lundy Road)	
Okaloosa		44.355	71.382	CR 2 west – Blackman	
Okaloosa	Almarante	46.162	74.291	CR 602 west	
Okaloosa	Laurel Hill	47.629	76.651	CR 85A north (Second Avenue)	
Okaloosa	Laurel Hill	49.115	79.043	CR 85A south	
Okaloosa	Svea	51.232	82.450	CR 393 south	
Walton		53.212	85.636	CR 52 north (Perkins Road)	
Walton	Pleasant Grove	54.184	87.201	CR 147 – Paxton, Lakewood	
Walton		56.486	90.905	SR 55 north – Florala	Alabama state line; northern terminus
1.000 mi = 1.609 km; 1.000 km = 0.621 mi
