= List of county roads in Okaloosa County, Florida =

- County road shields used in Florida

Highway names
- Interstates: Interstate X (I-X)
- US Highways: U.S. Highway X (US X)
- State: State Road X (SR X)
- County: County Road X (CR X)

System links
- County roads in Florida; County roads in Okaloosa County

The following is a list of county roads in Okaloosa County, Florida. All county roads are maintained by the county in which they reside.

== County roads in Okaloosa County, Florida ==
Route	Road Name(s)	From	To	Notes
CR 2		SR 189	Okaloosa-Walton County Line	former SR 2
CR 2B	Red B. Arrow Road	Olive Branch Road	SR 189 & CR 2	former SR 2B
CR 4	Anitoch Road	US 90	SR 85	former SR 4
CR 4A	Highway C 4A	SR 4	SR 189	former SR 4A
CR 4B	Charlie Day Road	CR 189	SR 4	former SR 4B
CR 30A	Calhoun Avenue; Cross Street; Beach Drive; Kelly Street; Main Street	US 98	US 98	former SR 30A
CR 30B	Benning Drive	US 98	CR 30A	former SR 30B
CR 30F	Airport Road	CR 30A	US 98	former SR 30F
CR 85A		Clear Springs	SR 85	former SR 85A
CR 85A	Second Avenue	SR 85	SR 85	former SR 85A; Another segment went northwest to Alabama
CR 85B				former SR 85B
CR 85C	Mooney Road Northeast	SR 188	SR 189	former SR 856; No direct connection to SR 85
CR 180		Alabama-Florida State Line	SR 189	former SR 180
CR 188	Old Bethel Road; Airport Road; Garden City Road	US 90	SR 85	former SR 188
CR 189	Log Lake Road; Summertime Drive	Yellow River Log Road	SR 4	former SR 189 gap along US 90 from Holt to Galliver
CR 189A	Main Street; Poplar Head Church Road; Melton Road	US 90/CR 189	SR 4	former SR 189A
CR 189A	Yacht Club Drive	SR 189	Ferry Road Northeast	former SR 189A
CR 190	College Boulevard	SR 85	SR 285	former SR 190
CR 280A	East Chestnut Avenue; Okaloosa Lane	East Railroad Avenue under SR 85 Railroad Bridge	US 90	former SR 280A; Another segment used to exist in northwestern Crestview.
CR 285		CR 285B	SR 285	former SR 285
CR 285B		SR 20	CR 285	former SR 285B
CR 393	Robinson Road; Dorcas Highway	US 90	SR 85	former SR 393
CR 397		US 90	north of Milligan	former SR 397
CR 602		CR 2	SR 85	former SR 602
CR 2378	Matthews Boulevard; Old Highway 98; Scenic Gulf Drive	US 98	Okaloosa-Walton County Line	former US 98 / SR 30
