= Florida State Road 188 =

State highway in Florida, United States

State Road 188
- Racetrack Road Northeast
- Florida State Road 188 highlighted in red

Route information
- Maintained by FDOT
- Length: 2.581 mi (4.154 km)

Major junctions
- West end: SR 189 / Hurlburt Road in Wright
- East end: SR 85 / Fourth Avenue in Ocean City

Location
- Country: United States
- State: Florida
- Counties: Okaloosa

Highway system
- Florida State Highway System; Interstate; US; State; Former; Pre‑1945; Toll; Scenic
← SR 187	→ SR 189

Florida State Road 188 (FL 188) is a 2.581-mile-long (4.154 km) state highway in Okaloosa County, Florida., that runs from Florida State Road 189 and Hurlburt Road in Wright to Florida State Road 85 and Fourth Avenue in Ocean City.

== Major intersections ==
The entire route is in Okaloosa County.

Location	mi	km	Destinations	Notes
Wright	0.000	0.000	SR 189 (Beal Parkway Northwest) / Hurlburt Road – Fort Walton Beach, Eglin AFB	Western terminus; continues beyond SR 189 as Hurlburt Road
Ocean City	1.444	2.324	Mooney Road Northwest (CR 85C north)	
Ocean City	2.581	4.154	SR 85 (Eglin Parkway Northeast) / Fourth Avenue	Eastern terminus; continues beyond SR 85 as Fourth Avenue
1.000 mi = 1.609 km; 1.000 km = 0.621 mi
