= Almarante, Florida =

Unincorporated area in Florida, U.S.

Coordinates: 30°56′30″N 86°28′40″W

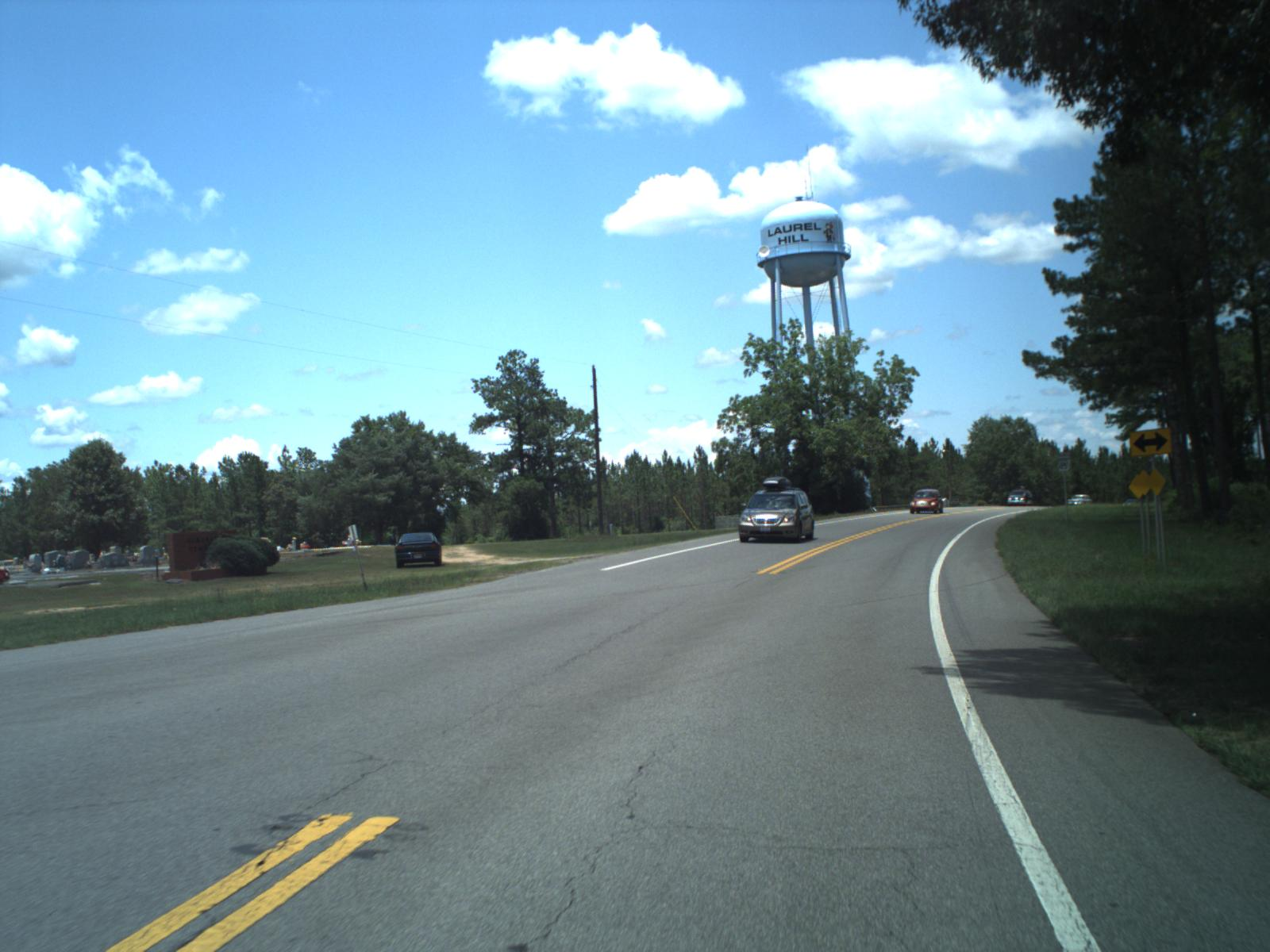
Almarante Cemetery (left)

Almarante is an unincorporated area in northeastern Okaloosa County, Florida, just southwest of Laurel Hill on State Road 85. Although the name is no longer in common use, the Almarante Cemetery (at the County Road 602 intersection) and Almarante Volunteer Fire Department (station near the top of the hill on SR 85 south of CR 602) retain the name.
