= Florosa, Florida =

- Unincorporated Community
- Community of Florosa, Florida
- Country: United States
- State: Florida
- County: Okaloosa

Government
  - Body: Okaloosa County

Population
  - Total: 5,941

Florosa is an unincorporated community in Okaloosa County in the state of Florida, United States. Florosa has a population of 5,941, as of the 2015 American Community Survey.

Florosa is a bedroom community for Hurlburt Field and Eglin Air Force Base. It is also home to Florosa Elementary School. Florosa is oftentimes considered to be part of either of the neighboring communities of Mary Esther or Navarre.
