= Florida State Road 393 =

State highway in Florida, United States

State Road 393
- Mary Esther Cut Off Northwest

Route information
- Maintained by FDOT
- Length: 1.833 mi (2.950 km)

Major junctions
- West end: US 98 in Mary Esther
- East end: SR 189 / Oak Street near Wright

Location
- Country: United States
- State: Florida
- Counties: Okaloosa

Highway system
- Florida State Highway System; Interstate; US; State; Former; Pre‑1945; Toll; Scenic
| ← SR 392A | → SR 397 |

State Road 393 (SR 393) is a 1.833-mile-long (2.950 km) state highway in Okaloosa County, Florida, that runs from U.S. Route 98 in Mary Esther to Florida State Road 189 in southern Wright.

== Major intersections ==
The entire route is in Okaloosa County.

| Location | mi | km | Destinations | Notes |
|---|---|---|---|---|
| Mary Esther | 0.000 | 0.000 | US 98 (Miracle Strip Parkway / SR 30) | Southern terminus |
| Wright | 1.833 | 2.950 | SR 189 (Beal Parkway Northwest) / Oak Street | Northern terminus; continues as Oak Street beyond SR 189 |
1.000 mi = 1.609 km; 1.000 km = 0.621 mi
