= Holt, Florida =

Unincorporated community in Florida, U.S.

Coordinates: 30°42′57″N 86°44′45″W

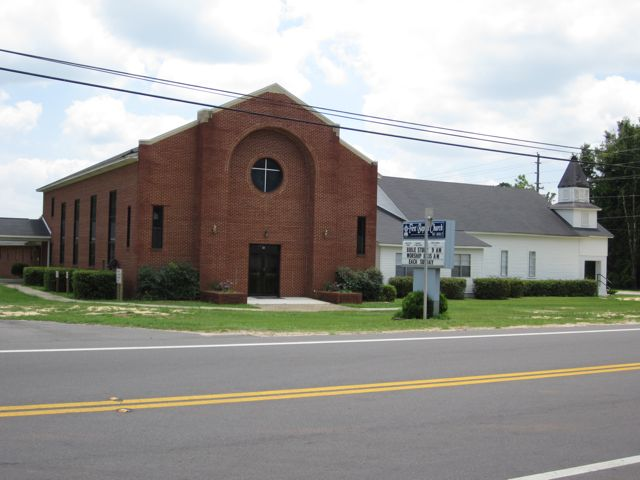
First Baptist Church of Holt

Holt is an unincorporated community located in Okaloosa County, Florida, United States. Its area code is 850, and its ZIP code is 32564.

Holt is located in western Okaloosa County along US 90 and County Road 189 (Log Lake Road). South along CR 189 is an interchange for Interstate 10 (Exit 45). The Blackwater River is approximately two miles to the northwest of the town.
