= Emerald Coast Rider =

Public transport agency in Florida

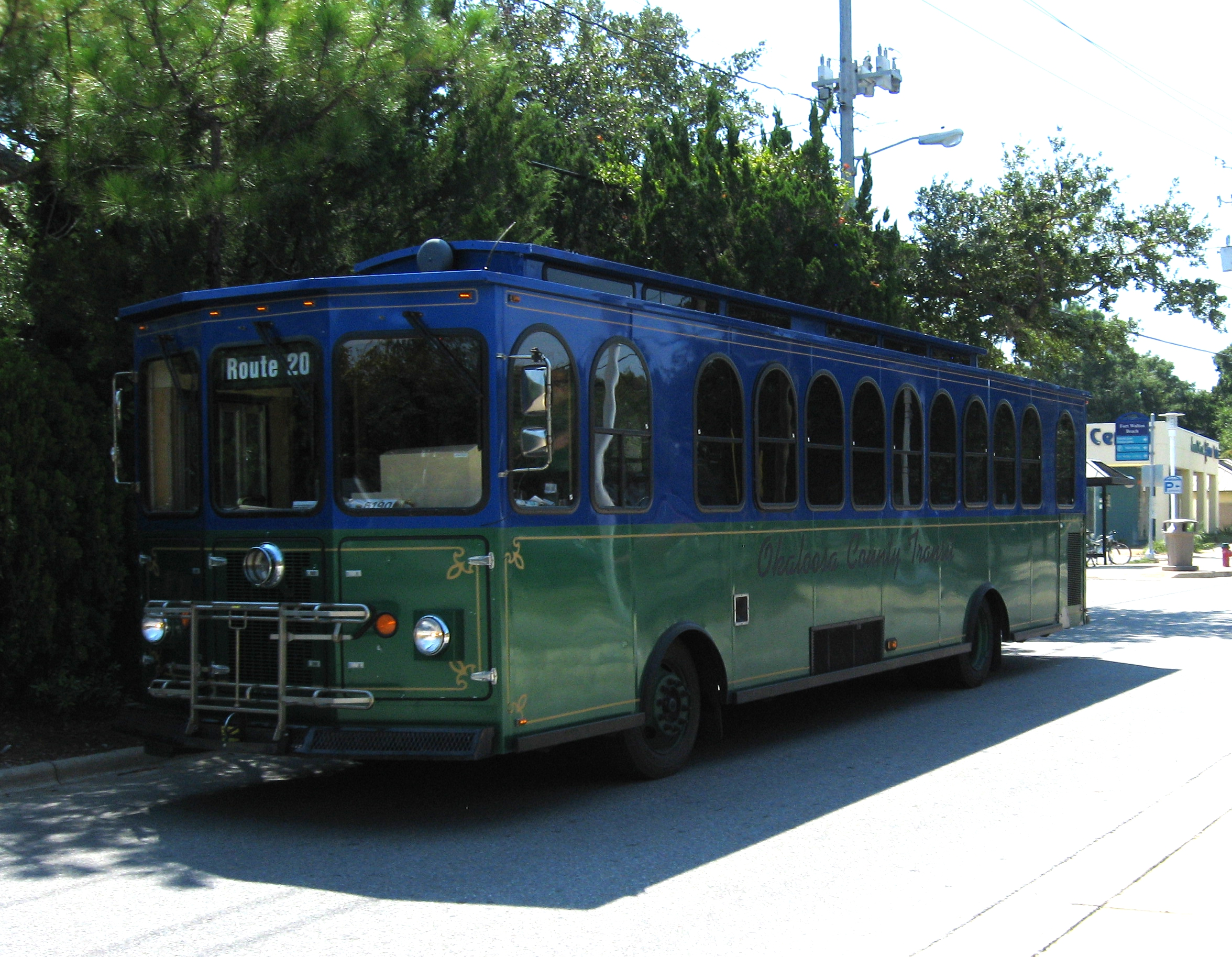
- Okaloosa County Transit Trolley, July 2011
- Founded: 1987
- Headquarters: 600 Transit Way
- Locale: Fort Walton Beach, Florida
- Service area: Okaloosa County, Florida
- Service type: bus service
- Routes: 11
- Destinations: Fort Walton Beach, Destin, and Crestview
- Fuel type: Diesel
- Operator: Maruti Fleet and Management
- Website: ecrider.org

Emerald Coast Rider (known as Okaloosa County Transit until 2015) is the public transportation agency that serves Okaloosa County, Florida. The service was founded in 1987 and served approximately 225,000 riders in 2009. Okaloosa County Transit offers deviated fixed route bus service and limited paratransit service countywide. Branded as The Wave, the agency provides service on weekdays and does the majority of business during the peak tourist season. Okaloosa County Transit also operates paratransit (door to door) service.

== Routes ==
- 1 Northwest Florida State College to Uptown Station
- 2 Santa Rosa Mall to Uptown Station
- 3 Northwest Florida State College to Santa Rosa Mall
- 4 Walmart Plaza to Uptown Station
- 11 North Okaloosa Medical Center to The Marketplace
- 12 Okaloosa County Courthouse to Addison Place Apartments
- 14 Wave Express from Crestview City Hall to Uptown Station
- 20 Boardwalk to Uptown Station
- 30 Boardwalk to East Pass Towers
- 32 Ninety-Eight Palms Plaza to Destin Commons
- 33 Silver Sand Outlets to Destin Commons
