= Bluewater Bay, Florida =

Coordinates: 30.48°N 86.43°W

Bluewater Bay
- Planned community
- Location within Florida
- Country: United States
- Counties: Okaloosa

Population
  - Total: 15,772 (2,022 Census)
- Time zone: Central Time Zone (CST)
  - Summer (DST): EDT
- Website: bluewaterbayfl.com

Bluewater Bay, Florida, is a planned community in Okaloosa County, Florida, United States. The 2,000-acre, 3,800-home residential community containing 73 subdivisions was established in 1978, and its first home was sold in the early 1980s.

== History ==
The community was developed by Raimund Herden, who gathered investors, both American and European, to purchase 1,600 acres of land for $5.6 million in 1975. Herden and his investor-associates as "Bluewater Bay Development Company, Ltd." began the required development studies, hiring Henningson Durham and Richardson engineers in Pensacola, FL. Additional engineering was provided by Baskerville Donovan Engineers in Pensacola. After extensive studies regarding existing conditions (soils, wetlands, tree surveys, archeology, and topography) and conformance to governing agencies, a Development Order was approved in 1977. Land was allotted for schools, parks, businesses, power substation, and county roads. In 1990 an additional 210 acres was added to the Development of Regional Impact's boundaries.

== Amenities ==
Bluewater Bay has a golf course designed by Tom Fazio and Jerry Pate, as well as a tennis facility, two large swimming pools, walking paths, and a 120-slip marina.
