= Florida State Road 190 =

State highway in Florida, United States

State Road 190
- Valparaiso Parkway
- Florida State Road 190 highlighted in red

Route information
- Maintained by FDOT
- Length: 1.227 mi (1.975 km)

Major junctions
- West end: SR 85 in Valparaiso
- East end: SR 397 in Valparaiso

Location
- Country: United States
- State: Florida
- Counties: Okaloosa

Highway system
- Florida State Highway System; Interstate; US; State; Former; Pre‑1945; Toll; Scenic
← SR 189	→ US 192

State Road 190 (SR 190) is a 1.2-mile-long (1.9 km) road connecting SR 85 (Eglin Parkway/Government Ave) with SR 397 (John Sims Parkway).

== Major intersections ==
The entire route is in Valparaiso, Okaloosa County.

mi	km	Destinations	Notes
0.000	0.000	SR 85 (Eglin Parkway)	
1.227	1.975	SR 397 (John Sims Parkway) – Niceville, Eglin AFB	
1.000 mi = 1.609 km; 1.000 km = 0.621 mi
