= Escambia Farms, Florida =

- Unincorporated community
- Interactive map of Escambia Farms, Florida
- Coordinates: 30°57′29″N 86°37′59″W
- Country: United States
- State: Florida
- County: Okaloosa
- Elevation: 217 ft (66 m)
- Time zone: UTC-6 (CST)
  - Summer (DST): UTC-5 (CDT)
- Area code: 850

Escambia Farms is a rural, unincorporated community in northern Okaloosa County, Florida, United States. It is part of the Fort Walton Beach–Crestview–Destin Metropolitan Statistical Area.

== History ==
Escambia Farms was a planned community created by the U.S. government in the 1930s to ease the effects of the Depression on farmers. Eighty-one homes were built on 115 tracts of land.
