= Florida State Road 397 =

State highway in Florida, United States

State Road 397
- Eglin Boulevard, John Sims Parkway

Route information
- Maintained by FDOT
- Length: 3.199 mi (5.148 km)

Southern segment
- Length: 0.899 mi (1,447 m)
- South end: SR 85 in Eglin AFB
- Major intersections: SR 189 in Eglin AFB
- North end: Eglin AFB gate in Eglin AFB

Northern segment
- Length: 2.300 mi (3.701 km)
- South end: Eglin AFB gate in Valparaiso
- Major intersections: SR 190 in Valparaiso
- North end: SR 85 in Niceville

Location
- Country: United States
- State: Florida
- Counties: Okaloosa

Highway system
- Florida State Highway System; Interstate; US; State; Former; Pre‑1945; Toll; Scenic
| ← SR 393 | → SR 399 |

State Road 397 (SR 397) is a 3.199-mile-long (5.148 km) state highway in Okaloosa County, Florida, that runs from Florida State Road 85 on the northern border of Eglin Air Force Base to Florida State Road 85 in western Niceville via Valparaiso. SR 397 is split into two segments by Eglin AFB.

== Major intersections ==
The entire route is in Okaloosa County.

| Location | mi | km | Destinations | Notes |
|---|---|---|---|---|
| Eglin AFB | 0.000 | 0.000 | SR 85 south (Eglin Parkway) | Southern terminus; no access from SR 397 south to SR 85 north or from SR 85 south to SR 397 north |
| Eglin AFB | 0.838 | 1.349 | SR 189 south (Pinchot Road) / Eglin AFB exit | Northern terminus of SR 189 |
| Eglin AFB | 0.899 | 1.447 | Eglin AFB gate | Northern terminus of southern segment |
Gap in route
| Valparaiso | 0.000 | 0.000 | Eglin AFB E gate | Southern terminus of northern segment |
| Valparaiso | 1.400 | 2.253 | SR 190 west (Valparaiso Parkway) | Eastern terminus of SR 190 |
| Niceville | 2.300 | 3.701 | SR 85 (Government Avenue / West John Sims Parkway) | Northern terminus |
1.000 mi = 1.609 km; 1.000 km = 0.621 mi
