= Svea, Florida =

- Unincorporated community
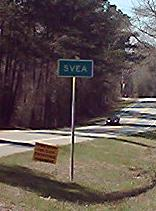
- Sign for Svea

- Location within Florida Location within the United States
- Coordinates: 30°58′04″N 86°24′12″W
- Country: United States
- State: Florida
- County: Okaloosa
- Elevation: 295 ft (90 m)
- Time zone: UTC-6 (Central (CST))
  - Summer (DST): UTC-5 (CDT)
- Area code: 850
- GNIS feature ID: 295659

Svea is an unincorporated community in Okaloosa County, Florida, United States.
