= Mary Esther, Florida =

- City
- City of Mary Esther, Florida
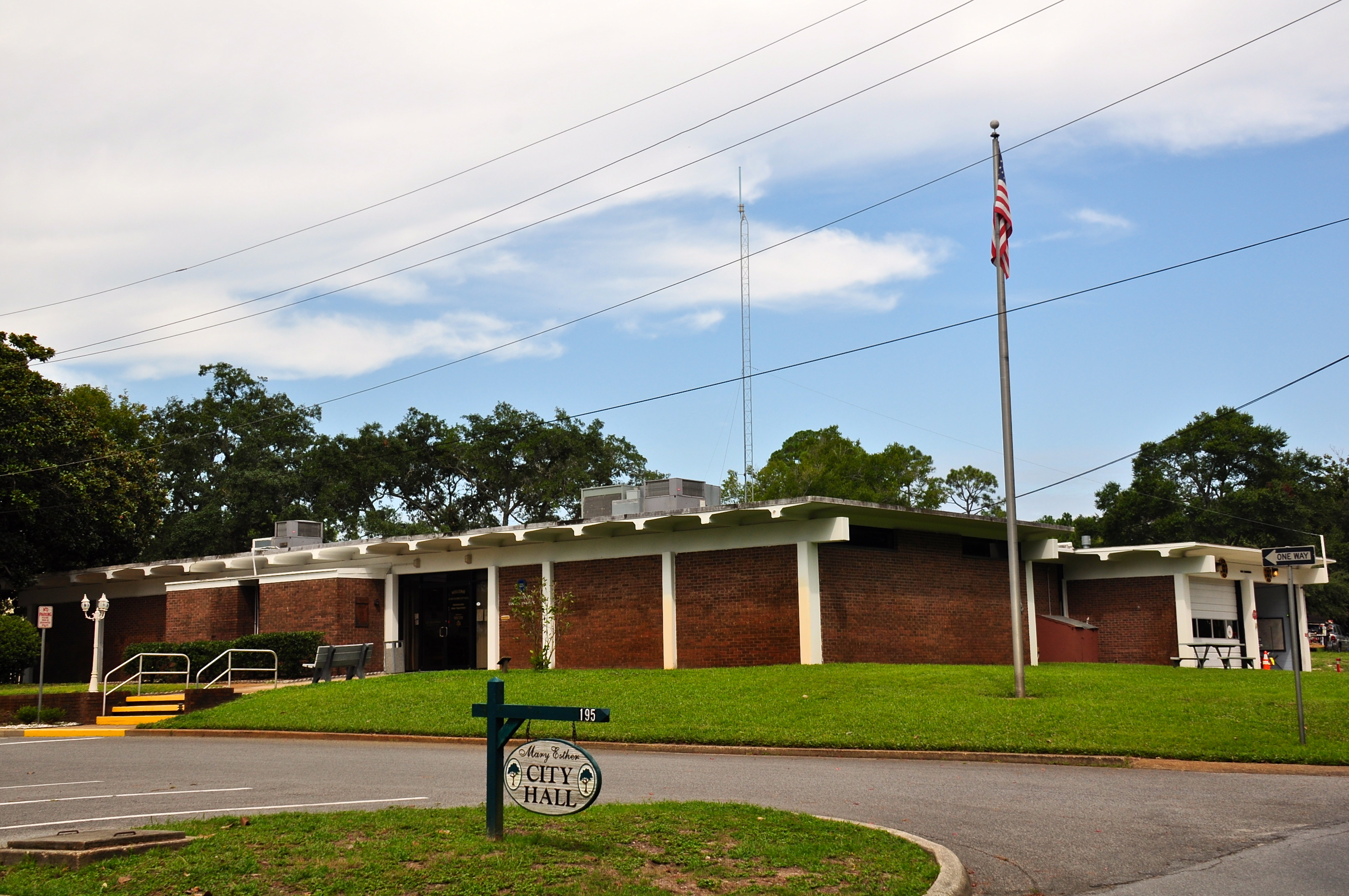
- Mary Esther City Hall, September 2014.

- Seal
- Motto(s): "Business•Service•Families" "A Growing Community"
- Interactive map of Mary Esther, Florida
- Coordinates: 30°24′46″N 86°39′32″W
- Country: United States
- State: Florida
- County: Okaloosa
- Settled: 1842
- Incorporated: 1946

Government
  - Type: Council-Manager
  - Mayor: Chris Stein
  - Mayor Pro Tem: Susan Coxwell
  - Councilmembers: Larry Carter, April Sutton, Bernie Oder, and Richard Lawson
  - City Manager: Jared Cobb
  - City Clerk: Dillon Morris

Area
  - Total: 1.46 sq mi (3.79 km^{2})
  - Land: 1.46 sq mi (3.77 km^{2})
  - Water: 0.0077 sq mi (0.02 km^{2})
- Elevation: 16 ft (4.9 m)

Population (2020)
  - Total: 3,982
  - Density: 2,736.7/sq mi (1,056.63/km^{2})
- Time zone: UTC-6 (Central (CST))
  - Summer (DST): UTC-5 (CDT)
- ZIP code: 32569
- Area code(s): 850, 448
- FIPS code: 12-43375
- GNIS feature ID: 2405034
- Website: cityofmaryesther.com

Mary Esther is a city in Okaloosa County, Florida, United States. It is part of the Crestview–Fort Walton Beach–Destin, Florida Metropolitan Statistical Area. The population was 3,982 at the 2020 US census, up from 3,851 at the 2010 census.

== Etymology ==
Mary Esther gets its name from its first postmaster, John Newton, who named it for both of his daughters.

== Geography ==
U.S. Route 98 is the main route through the city, leading east 4 mi (6 km) to Fort Walton Beach and west 37 mi (60 km) to Pensacola.

According to the United States Census Bureau, the city has a total area of 1.5 square miles (3.9 km^{2}), all land.

=== Climate ===
Climate is characterized by relatively high temperatures and evenly distributed precipitation throughout the year. This climate type is found on the eastern sides of the continents between 20° and 35° N and S latitude. The Köppen Climate Classification subtype for this climate is "Cfa" (C = mild temperate, f = fully humid, and a = hot summer), which is a humid subtropical climate zone.

== Demographics ==
Historical population
Census	Pop.	Note	%±
1950	332		—
1960	780		134.9%
1970	3,192		309.2%
1980	3,530		10.6%
1990	4,139		17.3%
2000	4,055		−2.0%
2010	3,851		−5.0%
2020	3,982		3.4%
U.S. Decennial Census

=== Racial and ethnic composition ===
Mary Esther racial composition (Hispanics excluded from racial categories) (NH = Non-Hispanic)
Race	Pop 2010	Pop 2020	% 2010	% 2020
White (NH)	2,933	2,755	76.16%	69.19%
Black or African American (NH)	263	262	6.83%	6.58%
Native American or Alaska Native (NH)	24	12	0.62%	0.30%
Asian (NH)	197	185	5.12%	4.65%
Pacific Islander or Native Hawaiian (NH)	4	8	0.10%	0.20%
Some other race (NH)	3	9	0.08%	0.23%
Two or more races/Multiracial (NH)	139	305	3.61%	7.66%
Hispanic or Latino (any race)	288	446	7.48%	11.20%
Total	3,851	3,982		

=== 2020 census ===
As of the 2020 census, Mary Esther had a population of 3,982. The median age was 42.6 years. 19.0% of residents were under the age of 18 and 19.1% were 65 years of age or older. For every 100 females, there were 98.5 males, and for every 100 females age 18 and over, there were 98.7 males age 18 and over.

As of 2020, 100.0% of residents lived in urban areas, while 0.0% lived in rural areas.

In 2020, there were 1,690 households in Mary Esther, of which 26.5% had children under the age of 18 living in them. Of all households, 47.6% were married-couple households, 20.7% were households with a male householder and no spouse or partner present, and 25.0% were households with a female householder and no spouse or partner present. About 27.1% of all households were made up of individuals, and 9.7% had someone living alone who was 65 years of age or older.

In 2020, there were 1,845 housing units, of which 8.4% were vacant. The homeowner vacancy rate was 2.3% and the rental vacancy rate was 6.5%.

The 2016-2020 American Community Survey estimated that 1,149 families resided in the city.

=== 2010 census ===
As of the 2010 United States census, there were 3,851 people, 1,770 households, and 1,071 families residing in the city.

=== 2000 census ===
At the 2000 census there were 4,055 people in 1,623 households, including 1,147 families, in the city. The population density was 2,635.0 inhabitants per square mile (1,017.4/km^{2}). There were 1,732 housing units at an average density of 1,125.5 per square mile (434.6/km^{2}). The racial makeup of the city was 83.65% White, 6.46% African American, 0.96% Native American, 3.77% Asian, 0.17% Pacific Islander, 1.21% from other races, and 3.77% from two or more races. Hispanic or Latino of any race were 4.09%.

Of the 1,623 households in 2000, 29.0% had children under the age of 18 living with them, 57.0% were married couples living together, 9.9% had a female householder with no husband present, and 29.3% were non-families. 21.7% of households were one person and 7.0% were one person aged 65 or older. The average household size was 2.50 and the average family size was 2.93.

In 2000, the age distribution was 23.4% under the age of 18, 7.8% from 18 to 24, 30.5% from 25 to 44, 25.1% from 45 to 64, and 13.3% 65 or older. The median age was 39 years. For every 100 females, there were 102.3 males. For every 100 females age 18 and over, there were 100.1 males.

In 2000, the median household income was $42,647 and the median family income was $47,917. Males had a median income of $31,030 versus $20,319 for females. The per capita income for the city was $22,488. About 4.1% of families and 5.7% of the population were below the poverty line, including 8.8% of those under age 18 and 1.0% of those age 65 or over.

== Libraries ==
The idea of a public library was first proposed on February 4, 1974, to the then Mayor Tom Pryor. The library was first named the Mary Esther Community Library. It was run by volunteers and not tax supported. The original building was only 585 square feet, with annual fees ranging from $1.00 per person to $5.00 for a family. The building was later able to get an expansion to 810 square feet. The Mary Esther Community Library was then renamed in October 1976 to the current name of the Mary Esther Public Library. In 1988 when the space for the library was deemed too small, the Friends of the Library group created a petition for the citizens calling on the City Council to build a newer, bigger library. On February 6, 1989, the City Council approved the new site and size of the library. While the new library was being built the state of Florida also elected to give $175,000 in matching funds to help with construction. Ground was broken on February 28, 1991, and the new Mary Esther Public Library opened to the public on March 9, 1992. Throughout the history of the Mary Esther Public Library there was talk of an Okaloosa County Library System, but it was repeatedly denied. The Okaloosa County Public Library Cooperative eventually formed in 1997 with Mary Esther as one of the member libraries. The library received its most recent renovation in 2004 after receiving a $350,000 grant, adding an additional 2,000 square feet.
