= Okaloosa County, Florida =

County in the United States

- County
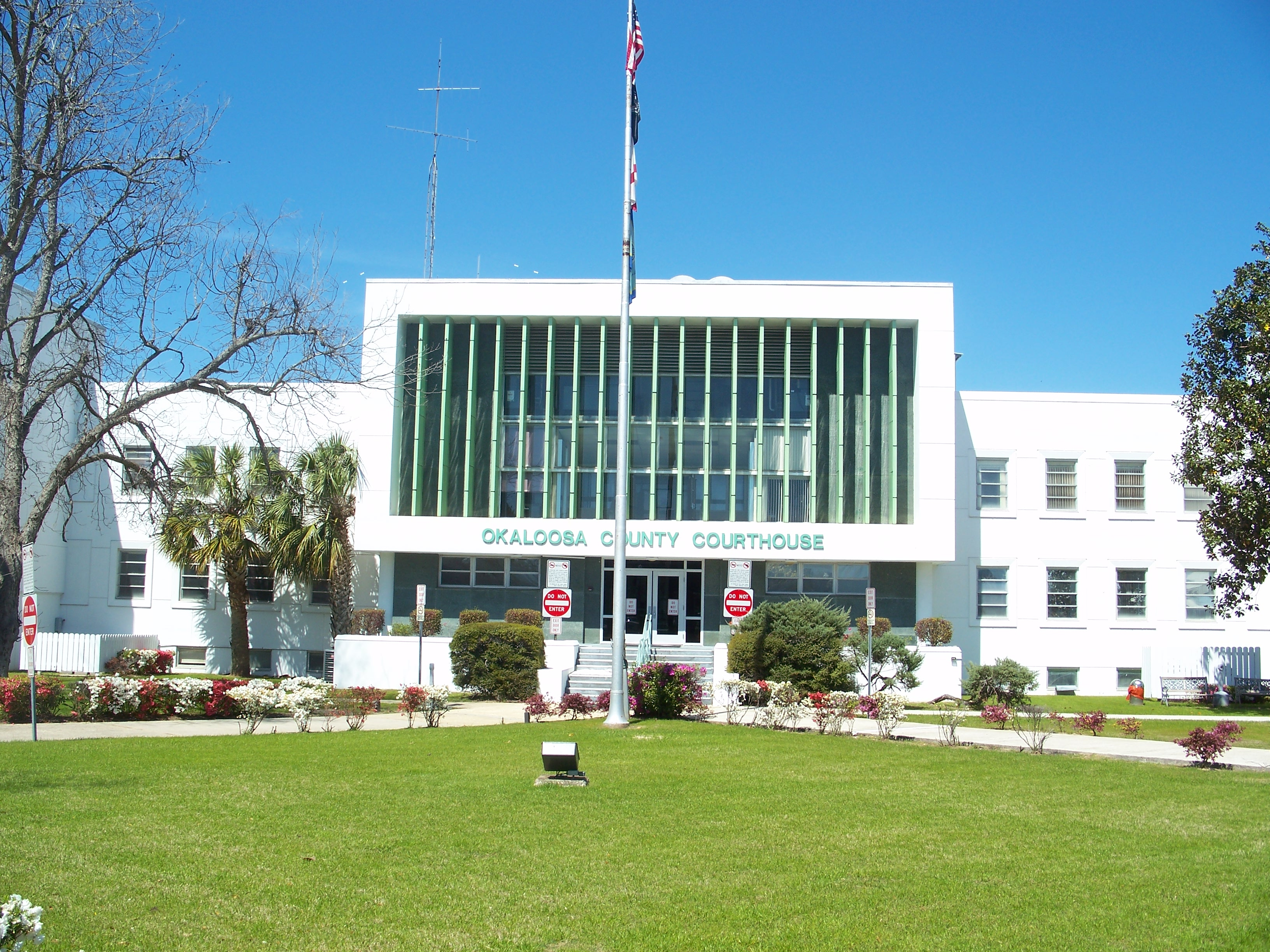
- The Okaloosa County Courthouse in March 2008

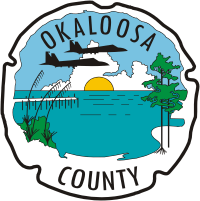
- Flag Seal

- Location within the U.S. state of Florida
- Coordinates: 30°41′15″N 86°35′33″W
- Country: United States
- State: Florida
- Founded: September 7, 1915
- Seat: Crestview
- Largest city: Crestview

Area
  - Total: 1,082 sq mi (2,800 km^{2})
  - Land: 930 sq mi (2,400 km^{2})
  - Water: 152 sq mi (390 km^{2}) 14.0%

Population (2020)
  - Total: 211,668
  - Estimate (2025): 221,810 ▲
  - Density: 230/sq mi (88/km^{2})
- Time zone: UTC−6 (Central)
  - Summer (DST): UTC−5 (CDT)
- Congressional district: 1st
- Website: myokaloosa.com

Okaloosa County is a county located in the northwestern portion of the U.S. state of Florida, extending from the Gulf of Mexico to the Alabama state line. It is notable for sugar-white sand beaches and clear emerald-green water; a major military presence; and numerous artificial reef projects. As of the 2020 census, the population was 211,668. Its county seat is Crestview. Okaloosa County is included in the Crestview-Fort Walton Beach-Destin, FL Metropolitan Statistical Area.

== History ==
After the American Civil War, the Florida panhandle was still an untamed wilderness and home to a group of rugged homesteaders who established subsistence farms and survived by hunting, fishing and trading. These pioneers enjoyed meeting other hardy folk to exchange goods, ideas and news. Trading posts sprang up which grew into small towns. The Okaloosa was a steamboat that ranged the Blackwater River from Pensacola to Milton. Okaloosa means "black water" (oka means "water" and lusa means "black") in the Choctaw language. The name may have come from the related language spoken by the Chatot and other peoples of the Florida Panhandle. Okaloosa County was created by an act passed by the Florida Legislature on September 7, 1915, formed from the eastern ranges of Santa Rosa County and the western ranges of Walton County. It became Florida's 52nd county. Milligan was the first county seat prior to a special election in 1917 which named Crestview as the permanent location. A courthouse was constructed soon after. The Pensacola and Atlantic Railroad provided access east to Tallahassee and Jacksonville's port. Northwest Florida contained large stands of virgin timber and pine. Lumber mills and turpentine operations became communities. Fishermen on the coast could take their catch by boat to Pensacola or loaded on trains to Jacksonville.

== Geography ==
According to the U.S. Census Bureau, the county has a total area of 1,082 square miles (2,800 km^{2}), of which 930 square miles (2,400 km^{2}) is land and 152 square miles (390 km^{2}) (14.0%) is water. The county reaches from the border of Alabama to the Gulf of Mexico. The northern Okaloosa County includes part of the Blackwater River State Forest, rolling hills with rich clay soil and crowded woodlands. The center of the county is dominated by the Choctawhatchee National Forest, military reservations and Duke Field. Southern Okaloosa includes the Gulf coast with tourism areas of Fort Walton Beach and Destin, Florida plus US Air Force facilities Hurlburt Field and Eglin Air Force Base.

=== Adjacent counties ===
- Covington County, Alabama - north
- Walton County - east
- Santa Rosa County - west
- Escambia County, Alabama - northwest

=== National protected areas ===
- Choctawhatchee National Forest (part)
- Gulf Islands National Seashore (part)

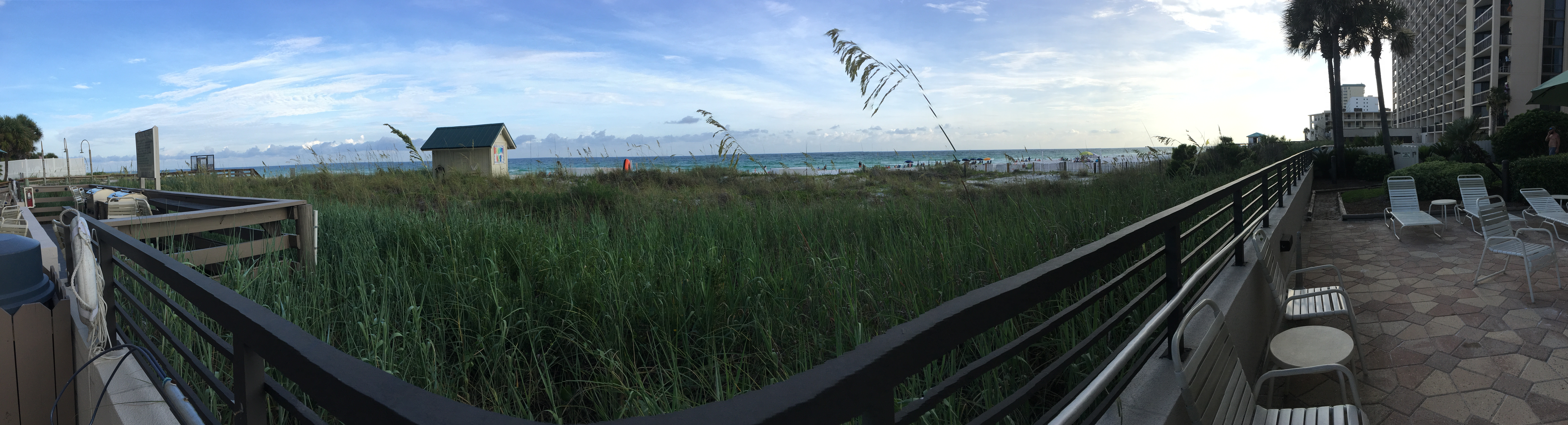
Beach in Destin, Florida

=== State Parks and Forests ===
- Blackwater River State Forest: 189,594 acres (76,726 ha) spanning Okaloosa and neighboring Santa Rosa County.
- Fred Gannon Rocky Bayou State Recreation Area: 357 acres (144 ha) of sand pine forest along Choctawhatchee Bay. The park provides facilities for camping, hiking, fishing, and canoeing. It is located five miles (8 km) east of Niceville on State Road 20.
- Henderson Beach State Park: 1.3 miles (2.1 km) of sugar sand beach along the Gulf of Mexico. The park provides facilities for camping, RV-ing, and picnicking, as well as a pavilion and boardwalk. It is located just east of downtown Destin on U.S. 98.

== Demographics ==
Historical population
Census	Pop.	Note	%±
1920	9,360		—
1930	9,897		5.7%
1940	12,900		30.3%
1950	27,533		113.4%
1960	61,175		122.2%
1970	88,187		44.2%
1980	109,920		24.6%
1990	143,776		30.8%
2000	170,498		18.6%
2010	180,822		6.1%
2020	211,668		17.1%
2025 (est.)	221,810	▲	4.8%
2020

=== Racial and ethnic composition ===
Okaloosa County, Florida – Racial and ethnic composition Note: the US Census treats Hispanic/Latino as an ethnic category. This table excludes Latinos from the racial categories and assigns them to a separate category. Hispanics/Latinos may be of any race.
Race / Ethnicity (NH = Non-Hispanic)	Pop 1980	Pop 1990	Pop 2000	Pop 2010	Pop 2020	% 1980	% 1990	% 2000	% 2010	% 2020
White alone (NH)	95,335	122,233	138,059	139,500	146,271	86.73%	85.02%	80.97%	77.15%	69.10%
Black or African American alone (NH)	9,332	12,835	15,232	16,333	18,896	8.49%	8.93%	8.93%	9.03%	8.93%
Native American or Alaska Native alone (NH)	420	737	931	895	799	0.38%	0.51%	0.55%	0.49%	0.38%
Asian alone (NH)	1,511	3,471	4,144	5,189	6,578	1.37%	2.41%	2.43%	2.87%	3.11%
Native Hawaiian or Pacific Islander alone (NH)	x	x	222	330	448	x	x	0.13%	0.18%	0.21%
Other race alone (NH)	745	73	379	397	1,206	0.68%	0.05%	0.22%	0.22%	0.57%
Mixed race or Multiracial (NH)	x	x	4,229	5,882	14,892	x	x	2.48%	3.25%	7.04%
Hispanic or Latino (any race)	2,577	4,427	7,302	12,296	22,578	2.34%	3.08%	4.28%	6.80%	10.67%
Total	109,920	143,776	170,498	180,822	211,668	100.00%	100.00%	100.00%	100.00%	100.00%

=== 2020 census ===
As of the 2020 census, the county had a population of 211,668. The median age was 38.1 years. 22.3% of residents were under the age of 18 and 16.6% of residents were 65 years of age or older. For every 100 females there were 100.5 males, and for every 100 females age 18 and over there were 99.6 males age 18 and over.

The racial makeup of the county was 71.7% White, 9.3% Black or African American, 0.6% American Indian and Alaska Native, 3.2% Asian, 0.2% Native Hawaiian and Pacific Islander, 3.8% from some other race, and 11.2% from two or more races. Hispanic or Latino residents of any race comprised 10.7% of the population.

89.4% of residents lived in urban areas, while 10.6% lived in rural areas.

There were 83,957 households in the county, of which 29.9% had children under the age of 18 living in them. Of all households, 49.8% were married-couple households, 19.3% were households with a male householder and no spouse or partner present, and 24.5% were households with a female householder and no spouse or partner present. About 26.6% of all households were made up of individuals and 10.3% had someone living alone who was 65 years of age or older.

There were 101,197 housing units, of which 17.0% were vacant. Among occupied housing units, 64.6% were owner-occupied and 35.4% were renter-occupied. The homeowner vacancy rate was 1.9% and the rental vacancy rate was 13.8%.

=== 2010 census ===
As of the census of 2010, the population density was 194.4 people per square mile (75.1 people/km^{2}).

Within the 2010 census, 33.10% had children under the age of 18 living with them, 56.20% were married couples living together, 10.20% had a female householder with no husband present, and 29.80% were non-families. 23.50% of all households were made up of individuals, and 7.50% had someone living alone who was 65 years of age or older. The average household size was 2.49 and the average family size was 2.94.

According to the 2010 census, the population was spread out, with 24.70% under the age of 18, 9.60% from 18 to 24, 31.10% from 25 to 44, 22.40% from 45 to 64, and 12.10% who were 65 years of age or older. The median age was 36 years. For every 100 females there were 102.20 males. For every 100 females age 18 and over, there were 101.50 males.

=== 2015 estimates ===
In 2015, the median income for a household in the county was $55,880. The per capita income for the county was $28,902. 11.3% of the population were below the poverty line.

== Economy ==
The primary driver of Okaloosa County is military and defense spending with three air force bases. Aviation and manufacturing include major defense contractors Lockheed Martin and Boeing and there is a constant supply of skilled people leaving the military. Williams International's billion-dollar manufacturing plant is located at Shoal River Industrial Park. All provide well-paying jobs It contributes $4.5 billion to the economy.
The next largest sector is real estate, leasing and rentals, which constitute $2.67 billion.
Business and professional services comes third, which constitutes corporate services, engineering and defense contracting for $2.6 billion.
Hospitality, retail sales and health care services are the last pillar of the economy at $2.5 billion.

== Education ==
The Okaloosa County School District is the school district in the county.

Northwest Florida State College serves over 10,000 residents of Okaloosa County annually for bachelor's degrees, associate degrees, and certificates. The college maintains four campuses in Okaloosa County: Niceville, Crestview, Ft. Walton Beach, and Hurlburt Field, and one campus in Walton County, FL.

== Libraries ==
Okaloosa County is served by the Okaloosa County Public Library Cooperative. Formed in October 1997, the Cooperative originally included the county and the cities of Crestview, Mary Esther, and Niceville. The cities of Fort Walton Beach, Valparaiso, and Destin all joined the Cooperative by the year 2000. The Okaloosa County Public Library Cooperative is governed by an independent, inter-governmental agency with seven members.

== Transportation ==
=== Airports ===
- Bob Sikes Airport
- Destin–Fort Walton Beach

=== Highways ===
- I-10 (Interstate 10) is the main west-to-east interstate highway in the county, and runs through central Okaloosa County. It contains two interchanges within the county; CR 189 (Exit 45) south of Holt, and later SR (Exit 56), south Crestview. A third interchange for Crestview is currently being built at Exit 53 for the P. J. Adams Parkway.
- US 90 (U.S. Highway 90) was the main west-to-east highway in central Okaloosa County, until it was surpassed by I-10.
- US 98 (U.S. Highway 98) remains the main west-to-east highway in southern Okaloosa County.
- SR 4
- SR 85
- SR 145
- SR 188
- SR 189
- SR 293
- SR 393
- SR 397

=== Surface transportation ===
Emerald Coast Rider (formerly Okaloosa County Transit) operates bus services in the county.

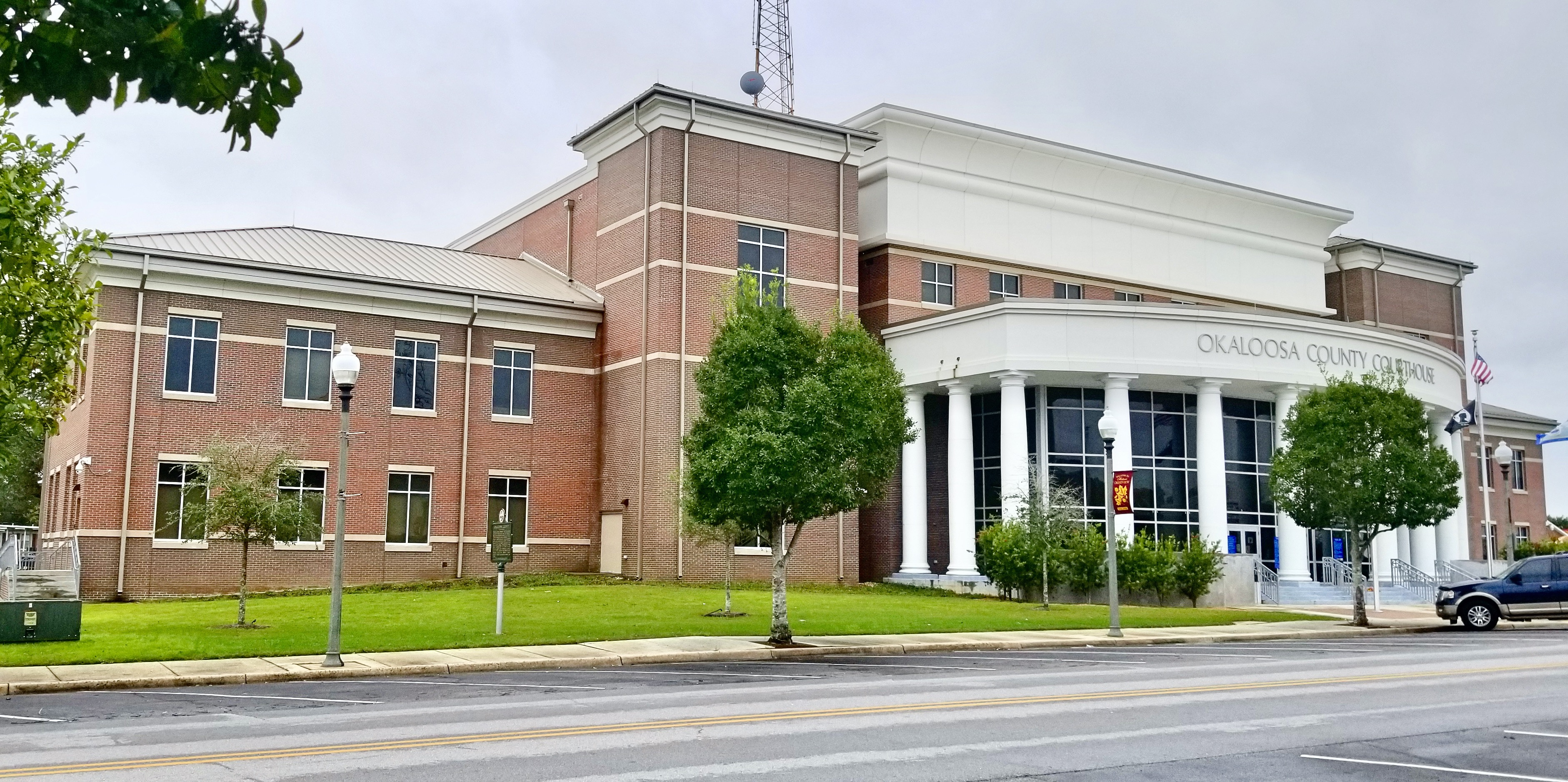
Okaloosa County's new Courthouse first case was held January 2, 2019.

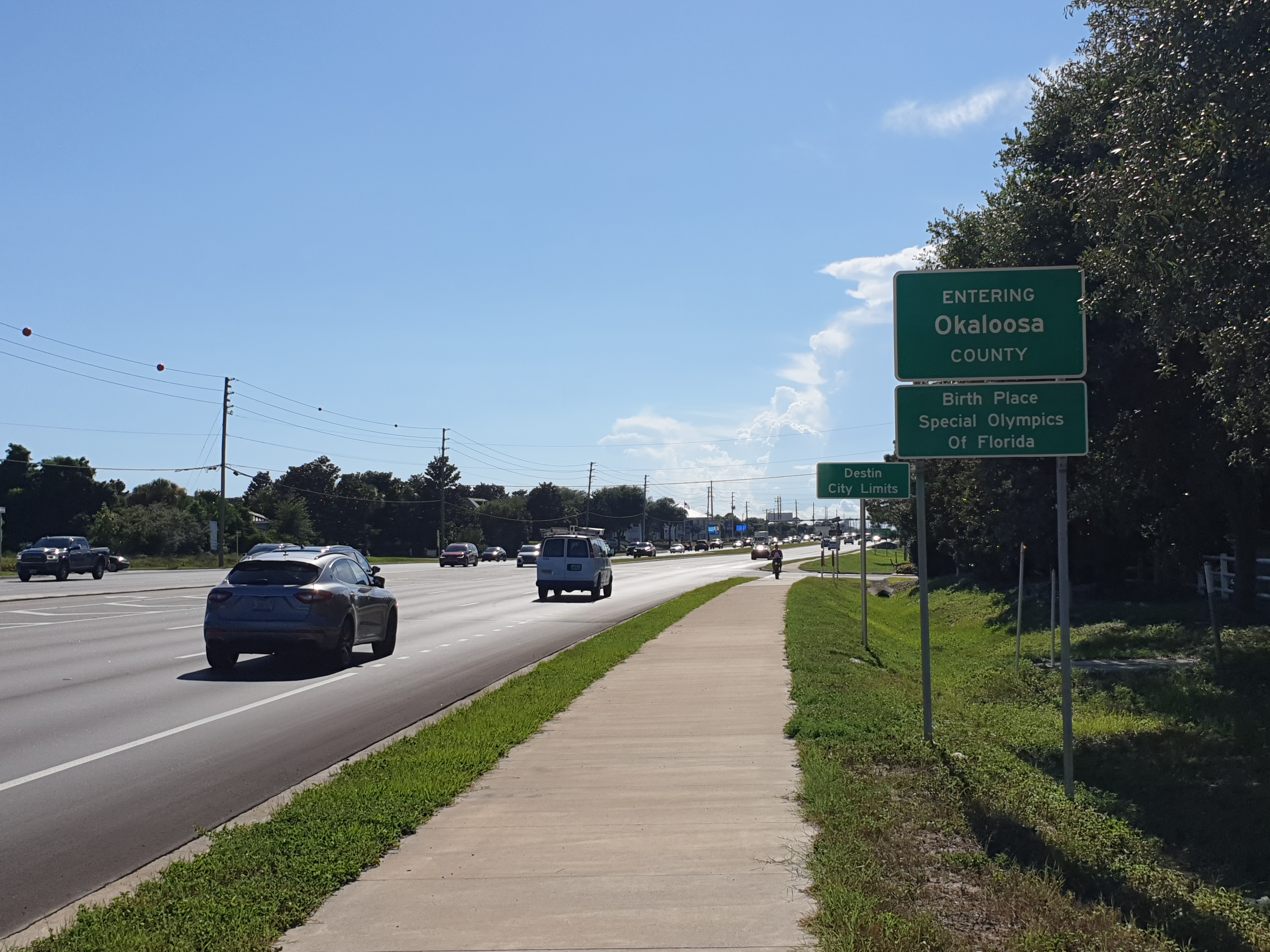
Several road signs at the county and Destin boundary.

== Law enforcement ==
In November 2023 in Fort Walton Beach, Okaloosa County Sheriff's deputy Jesse Hernandez and sergeant Beth Roberts shot multiple times at Hernandez's police car, where a handcuffed and unarmed black suspect had been placed there by police, according to investigators. The suspect was not injured by the shootings. Hernandez in December 2023 resigned from the department. In February 2024, it was announced that an internal investigation by the Okaloosa County Sheriff's office concluded that Hernandez began shooting after hearing the sound of an acorn bouncing off his police car, then Roberts began shooting after hearing Hernandez shooting and screaming, with Hernandez at one point shouting: "I'm hit! I'm hit!". Hernandez had told investigators that he thought he heard a gunshot from a "suppressed weapon" and believed that he had been shot: "I felt an impact on my right side, like upper torso area … I feel the impact. My legs just give out." The Sheriff's Office's stated that while Roberts' shooting was reasonable, Hernandez's shooting was "not objectively reasonable", but "we do believe [Hernandez] felt his life was in immediate peril".

In May 2024, an Okaloosa County Sheriff's deputy fatally shot Roger Fortson, a United States Air Force member, in Fortson's home in Fort Walton Beach. According to body camera footage, when the deputy visited an apartment, Fortson opened the apartment door holding a gun in his right hand, with the gun held by his side and pointed downwards. As the door opened, the deputy told Fortson to "step back" and immediately shot Fortson. Fortson falls to the floor, and it is only then that the deputy tells Fortson: "Drop the gun!"

Later in May 2024, a Florida woman sued the Okaloosa County Sheriff's Office, claiming that on two occasions, once in August 2019 and once in May 2020, they forced her to leave her home while she remained naked during the execution of search warrants, exposing her to law enforcement officers and the public.

== Politics ==
Okaloosa County is one of the most conservative counties in Florida. Incumbent George W. Bush won the county in 2004 with 78% of the popular vote and in 2008 the Republican candidate John McCain polled 72%. Mitt Romney won the county in 2012 with 73.80% (70,168) of the popular vote, and Donald Trump won 70.42% (71,893) in 2016. In 2020, Donald Trump won 68.25% of the vote.

United States presidential election results for Okaloosa County, Florida
Year	Republican		Democratic		Third party(ies)	
Year	No.	%	No.	%	No.	%
1916	303	31.86%	603	63.41%	45	4.73%
1920	411	40.98%	568	56.63%	24	2.39%
1924	183	19.20%	642	67.37%	128	13.43%
1928	1,385	72.70%	503	26.40%	17	0.89%
1932	232	9.79%	2,137	90.21%	0	0.00%
1936	457	15.81%	2,433	84.19%	0	0.00%
1940	690	18.68%	3,003	81.32%	0	0.00%
1944	626	17.87%	2,877	82.13%	0	0.00%
1948	486	12.13%	2,519	62.86%	1,002	25.01%
1952	2,355	30.47%	5,375	69.53%	0	0.00%
1956	2,788	32.66%	5,748	67.34%	0	0.00%
1960	4,685	36.18%	8,263	63.82%	0	0.00%
1964	9,961	55.80%	7,890	44.20%	0	0.00%
1968	5,525	26.54%	3,059	14.69%	12,237	58.77%
1972	23,303	88.64%	2,843	10.81%	144	0.55%
1976	18,598	55.86%	14,210	42.68%	487	1.46%
1980	28,072	69.62%	10,845	26.90%	1,406	3.49%
1984	37,044	83.51%	7,304	16.47%	9	0.02%
1988	40,389	80.04%	9,753	19.33%	320	0.63%
1992	32,818	53.13%	12,038	19.49%	16,913	27.38%
1996	40,683	64.53%	16,462	26.11%	5,899	9.36%
2000	52,186	73.69%	16,989	23.99%	1,644	2.32%
2004	69,693	77.65%	19,368	21.58%	695	0.77%
2008	68,789	71.82%	25,872	27.01%	1,120	1.17%
2012	70,168	73.80%	23,421	24.63%	1,486	1.56%
2016	71,893	70.42%	23,780	23.29%	6,423	6.29%
2020	79,798	68.35%	34,248	29.34%	2,697	2.31%
2024	80,309	70.31%	32,074	28.08%	1,842	1.61%

== Communities ==
=== Cities ===
- Crestview
- Destin
- Fort Walton Beach
- Laurel Hill
- Mary Esther
- Niceville
- Valparaiso

=== Towns ===
- Cinco Bayou
- Shalimar

=== Census-designated places ===
- Eglin AFB
- Hurlburt Field
- Lake Lorraine
- Ocean City
- Wright

=== Other unincorporated communities ===
- Baker
- Blackman
- Bluewater Bay
- Campton
- Deerland
- Dorcas
- Escambia Farms
- Florosa
- Garden City
- Holt
- Milligan
- Okaloosa Island
- Seminole
- Svea
- Timpoochee
- WynneHaven Beach

== See also ==
- National Register of Historic Places listings in Okaloosa County, Florida
