= Ocean City, Florida =

- CDP
- Location in Okaloosa County and the state of Florida
- Coordinates: 30°26′14″N 86°37′05″W
- Country: United States
- State: Florida
- County: Okaloosa

Area
  - Total: 2.05 sq mi (5.30 km^{2})
  - Land: 1.55 sq mi (4.02 km^{2})
  - Water: 0.49 sq mi (1.28 km^{2})
- Elevation: 13 ft (4.0 m)

Population (2020)
  - Total: 6,314
  - Density: 4,063.0/sq mi (1,568.75/km^{2})
- Time zone: UTC-6 (Central (CST))
  - Summer (DST): UTC-5 (CDT)
- FIPS code: 12-50925
- GNIS feature ID: 2403367

Ocean City is a census-designated place (CDP) in Okaloosa County, Florida, United States. The population was 6,314 at the 2020 census, up from 5,550 at the 2010 census. It is part of the Crestview–Fort Walton Beach–Destin, Florida Metropolitan Statistical Area.

== Geography ==
According to the United States Census Bureau, the CDP has a total area of 1.9 square miles (4.9 km^{2}), of which 1.6 square miles (4.1 km^{2}) is land and 0.3 square miles (0.78 km^{2}) (16.23%) is water.

== Demographics ==
Historical population
Census	Pop.	Note	%±
1990	5,422		—
2000	5,594		3.2%
2010	5,550		−0.8%
2020	6,314		13.8%
U.S. Decennial Census

=== 2020 census ===
As of the 2020 census, Ocean City had a population of 6,314. The median age was 39.4 years. 20.7% of residents were under the age of 18 and 16.5% of residents were 65 years of age or older. For every 100 females there were 96.7 males, and for every 100 females age 18 and over there were 98.6 males age 18 and over.

100.0% of residents lived in urban areas, while 0.0% lived in rural areas.

There were 2,671 households in Ocean City, of which 27.3% had children under the age of 18 living in them. Of all households, 37.7% were married-couple households, 23.9% were households with a male householder and no spouse or partner present, and 29.2% were households with a female householder and no spouse or partner present. About 30.4% of all households were made up of individuals and 9.5% had someone living alone who was 65 years of age or older.

There were 2,925 housing units, of which 8.7% were vacant. The homeowner vacancy rate was 1.3% and the rental vacancy rate was 10.0%.

Racial composition as of the 2020 census
Race	Number	Percent
White	4,177	66.2%
Black or African American	598	9.5%
American Indian and Alaska Native	31	0.5%
Asian	269	4.3%
Native Hawaiian and Other Pacific Islander	21	0.3%
Some other race	373	5.9%
Two or more races	845	13.4%
Hispanic or Latino (of any race)	963	15.3%

=== 2000 census ===
As of the 2000 census, there were 5,594 people, 2,478 households, and 1,479 families residing in the CDP. The population density was 3,493.5 inhabitants per square mile (1,348.8/km^{2}). There were 2,693 housing units at an average density of 1,681.8 per square mile (649.3/km^{2}). The racial makeup of the CDP was 83.98% White, 7.01% African American, 0.64% Native American, 3.24% Asian, 0.05% Pacific Islander, 1.59% from other races, and 3.49% from two or more races. Hispanic or Latino of any race were 4.31% of the population.

There were 2,478 households, out of which 23.3% had children under the age of 18 living with them, 44.8% were married couples living together, 11.3% had a female householder with no husband present, and 40.3% were non-families. 31.8% of all households were made up of individuals, and 9.8% had someone living alone who was 65 years of age or older. The average household size was 2.26 and the average family size was 2.83.

In the CDP, the population was spread out, with 20.9% under the age of 18, 9.8% from 18 to 24, 30.7% from 25 to 44, 23.3% from 45 to 64, and 15.3% who were 65 years of age or older. The median age was 38 years. For every 100 females, there were 98.0 males. For every 100 females age 18 and over, there were 98.3 males.

The median income for a household in the CDP was $35,759, and the median income for a family was $43,625. Males had a median income of $27,472 versus $23,049 for females. The per capita income for the CDP was $23,418. About 5.9% of families and 8.6% of the population were below the poverty line, including 15.4% of those under age 18 and 6.2% of those age 65 or over.
