= Wright, Florida =

- Census-designated place
- Location in Okaloosa County and the state of Florida
- Coordinates: 30°26′40″N 86°37′42″W
- Country: United States
- State: Florida
- County: Okaloosa

Area
  - Total: 5.58 sq mi (14.45 km^{2})
  - Land: 5.49 sq mi (14.23 km^{2})
  - Water: 0.085 sq mi (0.22 km^{2})
- Elevation: 39 ft (12 m)

Population (2020)
  - Total: 26,277
  - Density: 4,782.5/sq mi (1,846.55/km^{2})
- Time zone: UTC-6 (Central (CST))
  - Summer (DST): UTC-5 (CDT)
- FIPS code: 12-78800
- GNIS feature ID: 2403044

Wright is a census-designated place (CDP) in Okaloosa County, Florida, United States. The population was 26,277 at the 2020 United States census, up from 23,127 at the 2010 United States census. It is part of the Crestview–Fort Walton Beach–Destin, Florida Metropolitan Statistical Area.

== Geography ==
According to the United States Census Bureau, the CDP has a total area of 5.5 square miles (14 km^{2}), of which 5.5 square miles (14 km^{2}) is land and 0.1 square miles (0.26 km^{2}) (1.26%) is water.

== Demographics ==
Historical population
Census	Pop.	Note	%±
1990	18,945		—
2000	21,697		14.5%
2010	23,127		6.6%
2020	26,277		13.6%
U.S. Decennial Census

=== 2020 census ===
As of the 2020 census, Wright had a population of 26,277. The median age was 34.9 years. 21.7% of residents were under the age of 18 and 13.6% of residents were 65 years of age or older. For every 100 females there were 101.2 males, and for every 100 females age 18 and over there were 100.8 males age 18 and over.

100.0% of residents lived in urban areas, while 0.0% lived in rural areas.

There were 11,099 households in Wright, of which 27.3% had children under the age of 18 living in them. Of all households, 38.6% were married-couple households, 25.3% were households with a male householder and no spouse or partner present, and 28.9% were households with a female householder and no spouse or partner present. About 32.4% of all households were made up of individuals and 9.8% had someone living alone who was 65 years of age or older.

There were 11,989 housing units, of which 7.4% were vacant. The homeowner vacancy rate was 1.5% and the rental vacancy rate was 7.1%.

Racial composition as of the 2020 census
Race	Number	Percent
White	15,007	57.1%
Black or African American	3,838	14.6%
American Indian and Alaska Native	226	0.9%
Asian	1,278	4.9%
Native Hawaiian and Other Pacific Islander	70	0.3%
Some other race	2,287	8.7%
Two or more races	3,571	13.6%
Hispanic or Latino (of any race)	4,963	18.9%

=== 2000 census ===
As of the census of 2000, there were 21,697 people, 9,134 households, and 5,507 families residing in the CDP. The population density was 3,967.0 inhabitants per square mile (1,531.7/km^{2}). There were 10,004 housing units at an average density of 1,829.1 per square mile (706.2/km^{2}). The racial makeup of the CDP was 76.01% White, 19.03% African American, 0.59% Native American, 3.40% Asian, 0.19% Pacific Islander, 1.53% from other races, and 4.24% from two or more races. Hispanic or Latino of any race were 5.24% of the population.

There were 9,134 households, out of which 29.0% had children under the age of 18 living with them, 42.9% were married couples living together, 12.7% had a female householder with no husband present, and 39.7% were non-families. 29.1% of all households were made up of individuals, and 7.0% had someone living alone who was 65 years of age or older. The average household size was 2.31 and the average family size was 2.84.

In the CDP, the population was spread out, with 23.2% under the age of 18, 12.4% from 18 to 24, 34.1% from 25 to 44, 20.1% from 45 to 64, and 10.2% who were 65 years of age or older. The median age was 34 years. For every 100 females, there were 101.1 males. For every 100 females age 18 and over, there were 99.1 males.

The median income for a household in the CDP was $36,940, and the median income for a family was $43,802. Males had a median income of $26,870 versus $21,646 for females. The per capita income for the CDP was $18,746. About 8.4% of families and 10.9% of the population were below the poverty line, including 16.2% of those under age 18 and 7.3% of those age 65 or over.
