= Santa Rosa Beach, Florida =

- Unincorporated community
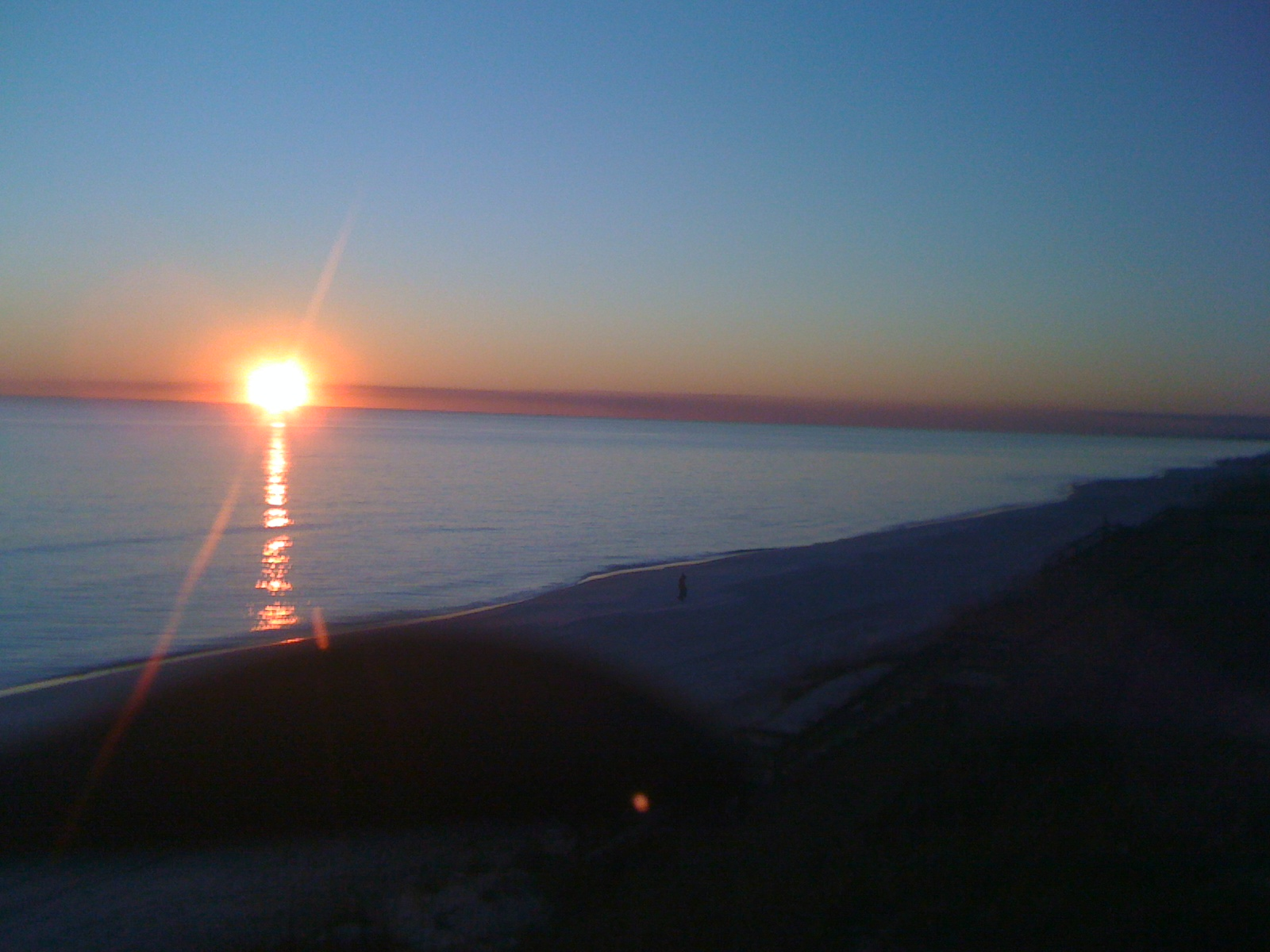
- Santa Rosa Beach in November 2011
- Interactive map of Santa Rosa Beach, Florida
- Coordinates: 30.361486°N 86.159116°W
- Country: United States
- State: Florida
- County: Walton

Area
  - Land: 65 sq mi (170 km^{2})
  - Water: 0.82 sq mi (2.1 km^{2})
- Elevation: 3.3 ft (1 m)

Population (2019)
  - Total: 14,028
- Time zone: UTC-6 (CST)
  - Summer (DST): UTC-5 (CDT)
- ZIP code: 32459

Santa Rosa Beach is an unincorporated community in Walton County, Florida, United States. It is part of the Crestview-Fort Walton Beach-Destin, Florida Metropolitan Statistical Area.

== Geography ==
Santa Rosa Beach is located at 30.3960324°, -86.2288322°. It is located north of U.S. Route 98 on the shores of Hogtown Bayou of the Choctawhatchee Bay. U.S. Route 98 leads east 18 mi (29 km) to Rosemary Beach and west 10 mi (16 km) to Miramar Beach.

The town was originally known as Hogtown until the later part of the 18th Century.

Although unincorporated, the area is assigned a specific ZIP code, 32459, which also includes the communities of Point Washington to the East and a 15-mile stretch of the Emerald Coast from the east side of Miramar Beach to the west side of Seagrove Beach and the beach communities along 30A, including Grayton Beach and Seaside.

Overall, this zip code covers a land area of 65 mi^{2} (42,000 acres; 170 km^{2}) (plus 0.82 mi^{2} [520 acres; 2.1 km^{2}] of water area) for a population of 11,457 (4,831 households) according to the 2010 census.

== Notable residents ==
- Tommy Tuberville, U.S. Senator and 55th governor of Alabama

== See also ==
- Deer Lake State Park
- Grayton Beach State Park
- Point Washington State Forest
- Topsail Hill Preserve State Park
