= Emerald Coast =

Coordinates: 30.4°N 86.5°W

- Region
- Interactive map of Emerald Coast
- Country: United States
- State: Florida
- Cities: Pensacola; Pensacola Beach; Navarre; Fort Walton Beach; Destin; Panama City

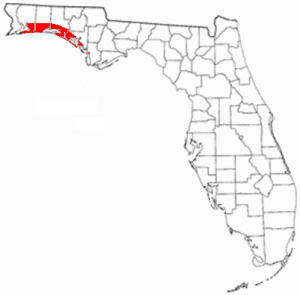
Location of Florida's Emerald Coast

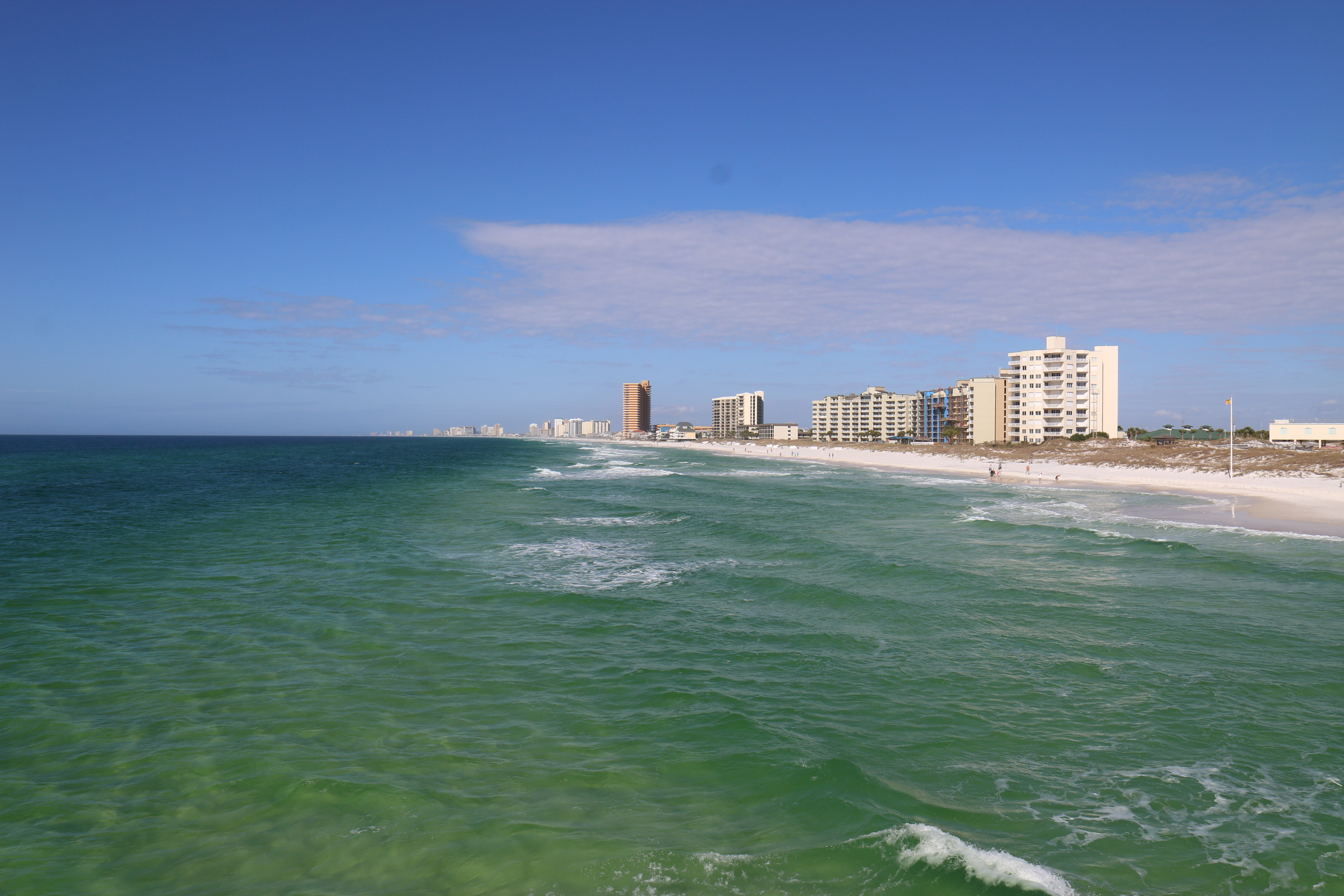
Emerald-green waters at St. Andrews State Park, near the eastern edge of the Emerald Coast

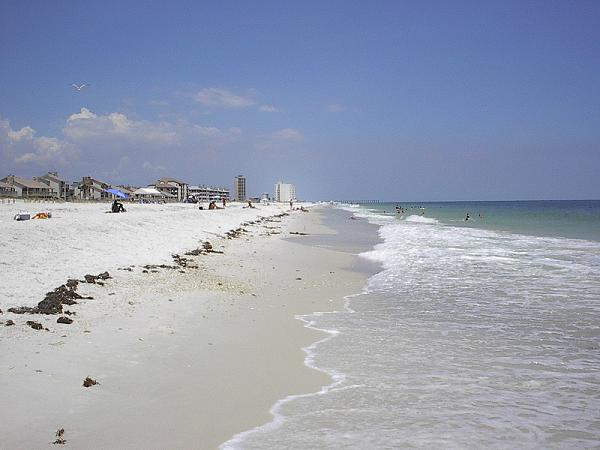
Pensacola Beach, the western part of the Emerald Coast

The Emerald Coast is an unofficial name for the coastal area in the US state of Florida on the Gulf of Mexico that stretches about 100 miles (160 km) through five counties—Escambia, Santa Rosa, Okaloosa, Walton, and Bay—which include Pensacola Beach, Navarre Beach, Fort Walton Beach, Destin, and Panama City Beach. Some southern Alabama communities on the coast of Baldwin County, such as Gulf Shores, Orange Beach, and Fort Morgan, use the term as well.

== Origin of term ==
Beginning in 1946, for marketing purposes the coast from Fort Walton Beach to Panama City was named the "Playground of the Gulf Coast", as witnessed by the name of the Fort Walton Beach newspaper, the Playground News, later the Playground Daily News, and now the Northwest Florida Daily News.

In 1952, this stretch of coast was dubbed the "Miracle Strip" by Claude Jenkins, a local journalist. The term was reflected in the former Miracle Strip Amusement Park, its successor Miracle Strip at Pier Park and other local businesses. The name "Miracle Strip" was officially adopted by 35 officials and members of three district Florida Motor Courts Association chapters on March 14, 1956, at a meeting held at the Staff Restaurant in Fort Walton Beach, for the 100-mile stretch of scenic Highway 98's "fabulous string of motels, hotels and nightspots" from Pensacola to Panama City. Members included representatives of local chambers of commerce.

According to the Daily News, the term Emerald Coast was coined in 1983 by a junior high school student, Andrew Dier, who won $50 in the contest for a new area slogan. Since then, the term has been expanded by popular usage to cover all of the northwest coast of Florida from Pensacola Beach to Panama City Beach.

The area and particularly the beaches along the Emerald Coast from Pensacola to Panama City are also referred to as the "Redneck Riviera," alluding to the strong Southern culture of the hinterland.

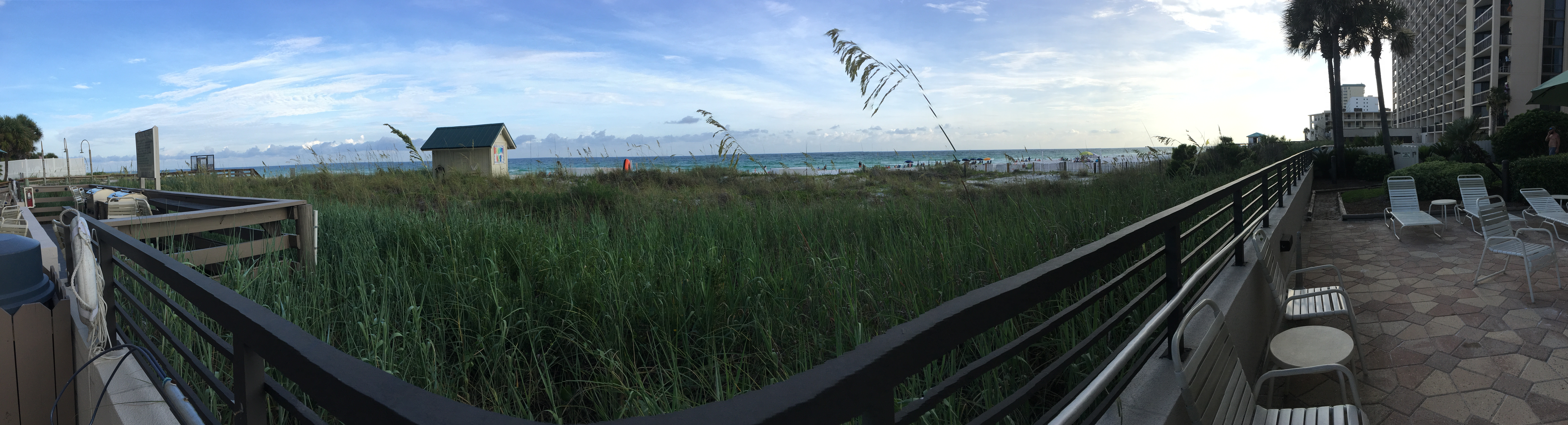
Beach in Destin, at the center of the Coast

Popular vacation destinations include Panama City, Pensacola, Pensacola Beach, Gulf Breeze, Navarre, Navarre Beach, Fort Walton Beach, Niceville, WaterColor, Panama City Beach, Destin, and Seaside, a planned community whose iconic pastel-paint and tin-roof construction was made famous in the Jim Carrey movie The Truman Show, filmed in the area from 1996–1997. Other communities on the Emerald Coast are Perdido Key, Sandestin, Mexico Beach, Grayton Beach, Inlet Beach, and Santa Rosa Beach.

The area is a family drive destination, attracting tourists from across the Southern United States due to its close proximity. The Emerald Coast is a three-hour drive east of New Orleans. In the first decade of the 21st century, the popularity of the Emerald Coast expanded greatly, leading to new construction and rapid growth. Many development communities similar to Seaside sprang up in the southern part of Walton County and at the western end of Panama City Beach, raising property values.

Deep-sea fishing is an area attraction, with Destin holding the nickname "World's Luckiest Fishing Village" (and several saltwater world records) and Panama City Beach hosting the annual high-dollar Bay Point Billfish Invitational. The area has many seafood restaurants.

On 15 October 2019, the Okaloosa Board of County Commissioners approved a new “destination logo” that the Tourist Development Council had recommended, to be introduced in the TDC's new marketing campaign beginning in January 2020. The “Emerald Coast” will be dropped for a simplified logo reading Destin Fort Walton Beach, Florida. This aligns with the renaming of the Northwest Florida Regional Airport to the Destin–Fort Walton Beach Airport in February 2015.

== Military bases ==
This part of Florida is home to numerous military bases, with installations including Naval Air Station Pensacola (home of the Navy's Blue Angels demonstration team and the initial training site for all naval aviators), Hurlburt Field, Eglin Air Force Base (one of the largest military bases in America), Tyndall Air Force Base, Coastal Systems Station-Naval Surface Warfare Center (home to the Navy Experimental Diving Unit and Naval Diving & Salvage Training Center), and Corry Station Naval Technical Training Center. Two other military bases, Duke Field and Naval Air Station Whiting Field are also in the area but are located inland from the coast.

== In popular culture ==
The well-established military presence in the region has led to many film appearances, the earliest being the practice takeoff runs by Doolittle Raiders for Thirty Seconds Over Tokyo, shot at Peel Field, an auxiliary field at Eglin Field, in 1944. Some scenes in the 1949 film Twelve O'Clock High, another film about World War II, were also shot at Eglin.

The 1972 eco-horror film Frogs was filmed in Walton County, Florida, in and around the Wesley House, an old Southern mansion located in Eden Gardens State Park in the town of Point Washington, situated on Tucker Bayou off Choctawhatchee Bay.

Exterior shots and several interior scenes for 1998's The Truman Show were filmed in Seaside.

The 1998 Sega Dreamcast game Sonic Adventure features a level called Emerald Coast.

The majority of scenes for Jaws 2 (1978) were filmed in the region, in the Navarre area. Interiors for the youth's pinball hang-out were filmed in Fort Walton Beach at the now-razed original location of Hog's Breath Saloon on Okaloosa Island, and Bruce the Shark's control sled was placed on the bottom of the Gulf off Navarre Beach and the mainland community of Navarre.

"Redneck Riviera" is the title of a song by Tom T. Hall (from his 1996 album Songs from Sopchoppy) about this region and the nearby Forgotten Coast. The song's lyrics include:

Gulf Shores up through Apalachicola
They got beaches of the whitest sand
Nobody cares if Grandma's got a tattoo
Or Bubba's got a hot wing in his hand

Parts of John Grisham's book The Whistler (2016) take place in and around the Emerald Coast.

== See also ==
- Florida Panhandle
- Forgotten Coast (neighboring coastal area to the east)
- South Alabama (neighboring coastal area to the west)
- West Florida
