= Point Washington State Forest =

State forest in Florida, United States

- Map of Florida with Walton County indicated in red
- Location: Walton County, Florida
- Nearest city: Point Washington
- Area: 15,131 acres (6,123 ha)
- Governing body: Florida Forest Service

The Point Washington State Forest is in the U.S. state of Florida. The 15,131-acre (61 km^{2}) forest is located in the panhandle, in southern Walton County. It was purchased under Florida's Conservation and Recreation Lands (CARL) program in 1992. The main road through the forest is U.S. Route 98, and it is also near the Topsail Hill Preserve, Grayton Beach and Deer Lake State Parks.

The Florida Forest Service uses prescribed burns to reduce accumulated undergrowth and maintain biodiversity in the forest.

== See also ==
- List of Florida state forests
- List of Florida state parks
