= Seagrove Beach, Florida =

- Unincorporated community
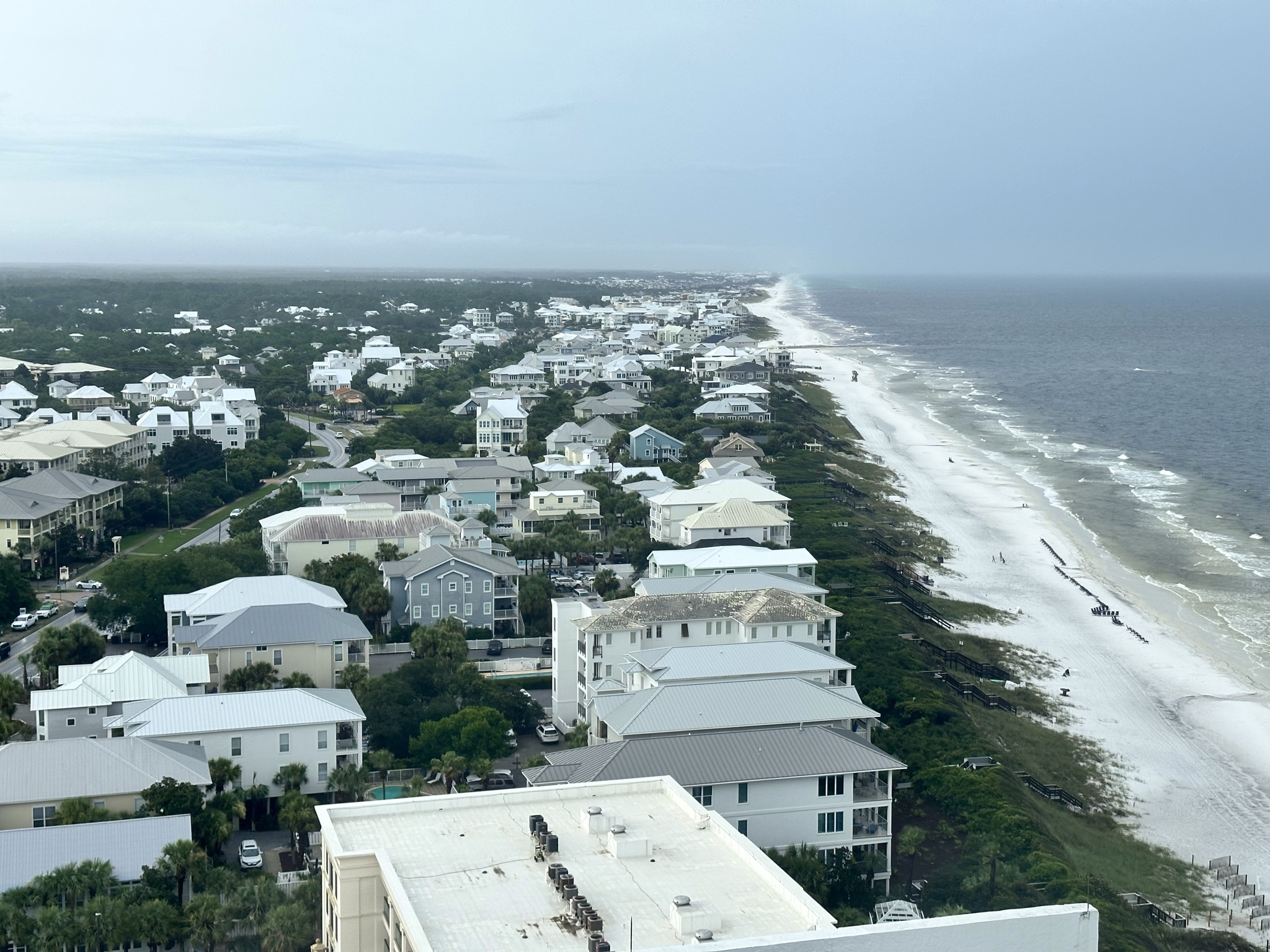
- Seagrove Beach as seen from One Seagrove Place
- Interactive map of Seagrove Beach, Florida
- Coordinates: 30°19′07″N 86°07′49″W
- Country: United States
- State: Florida
- County: Walton
- Elevation: 3.3 ft (1 m)
- Time zone: UTC-6 (Central (CST))
  - Summer (DST): UTC-5 (CDT)
- ZIP code: 32459

Seagrove Beach, Florida is a two-mile-long beach community located on the Gulf of Mexico in Walton County, Florida, United States. It is located along Florida State Road 30A, east of Seaside and west of WaterSound. Seagrove Beach is recognized locally as an independent neighborhood, but its mailing address is Santa Rosa Beach. Like other communities along 30A and Florida's Emerald Coast, Seagrove Beach is known for its scenic and appealing "sugar white" beaches and blue/green waters. There are 20 public beach accesses available for use in Seagrove Beach. One Seagrove Place is the tallest and one of the oldest condominiums in the area. According to the Visit South Walton website, Seagrove Beach is "laid back, but luxurious" and home to upscale boutiques, casual cafes, a state park, and rare coastal dune lakes.

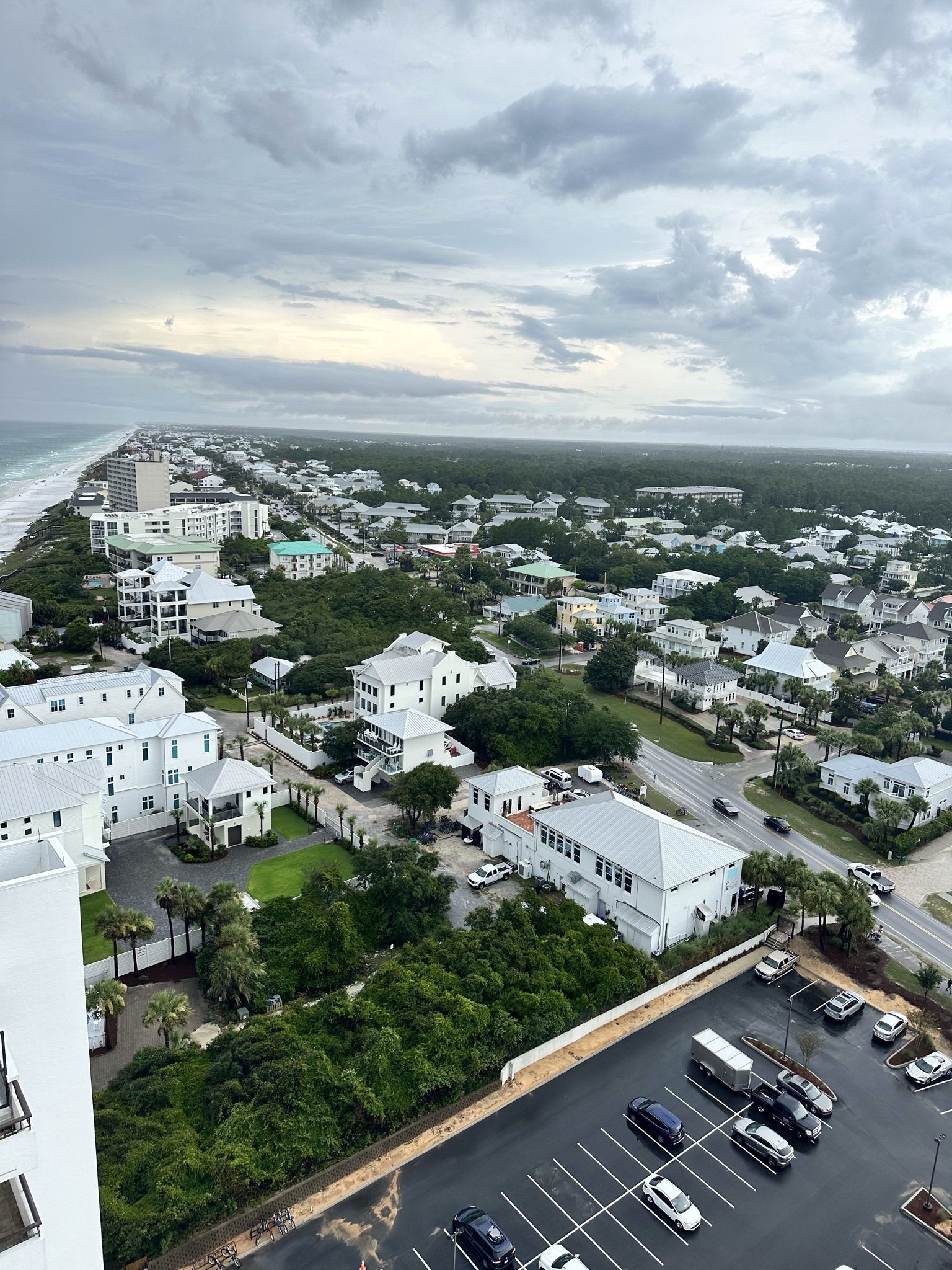
Overhead view of the buildings and shore of Seagrove Beach
