= Will the Circle Be Unbroken (disambiguation) =

"Will the Circle Be Unbroken?" is a Christian hymn.

Will the Circle Be Unbroken may also refer to:

- Will the Circle be Unbroken (album), 1972 album by the Nitty Gritty Dirt Band
- Will the Circle Be Unbroken: Volume Two, 1989 album by the Nitty Gritty Dirt Band
- Will the Circle Be Unbroken, Volume III, 2002 album from The Nitty Gritty Dirt Band
- Will the Circle Be Unbroken: Reflections on Death, Rebirth and Hunger for a Faith, 2001 collection of oral histories by Studs Terkel
- Will the Circle Be Unbroken? a 2020 memoir by Sean Dietrich
- "Will the Circle Be Unbroken" (Knots Landing), a 1980 television episode

== See also ==
- "Can the Circle Be Unbroken (By and By)", title of a country/folk song reworked by A. P. Carter from the hymn "Will the Circle Be Unbroken?"
