= Florida State Road 30A =

Highway in Florida, US

State Road 30A

Route information
- Auxiliary route of SR 30
- Maintained by FDOT

Location
- Country: United States
- State: Florida
- Counties: Walton, Bay, Gulf

Highway system
- Florida State Highway System; Interstate; US; State; Former; Pre‑1945; Toll; Scenic
← SR 30	→ SR 31
← SR 391	→ SR 393

State Road 30A (SR 30A) is a Florida Department of Transportation designation shared by four alternate routings of SR 30 in the Florida panhandle. Two segments have SR 30A signage; the other two do not as they are segments of U.S. Route 98 (US 98). Three of the four SR 30A segments are next to the shore of the Gulf of Mexico for most (if not all) of their length.

== CR 30A: Point Washington State Forest segment ==
Just west of Santa Rosa Beach, near East Hewett Road, CR 30A branches off Reddick Road (US 98/SR 30) and heads southeastward toward the shore of the Gulf of Mexico. While US 98/SR 30 continues through the heart of Point Washington State Forest, CR 30A follows the shoreline, passing through Grayton Beach and Seaside, before rejoining SR 30 near Inlet Beach.

While US 98/SR 30 spans the length of Point Washington State Forest, CR 30A doesn't avoid it completely: the westernmost mile (1.6 km) forms the boundary between the state forest and Topsail Hill Preserve State Park. Continuing along the Gulf of Mexico, CR 30A cuts through approximately three miles (4.8 km) of state forest between Blue Mountain Beach and Seaside and another 3 miles (4.8 km) of Deer Lake State Park to the southeast of Seagrove Beach.

== SR 30A: Panama City Beach segment ==
About 2 miles (3.2 km) to the east of the eastern terminus of the Point Washington State Forest segment of SR 30A, and 1 mile (1.6 km) west of Hollywood Beach (not to be confused with the city of Hollywood between Miami and Fort Lauderdale), US 98 and (unsigned) SR 30 separate. While SR 30 continues along the shore of the Gulf of Mexico as Front Beach Road, US 98 continues roughly 1 mile (1.6 km) inland (as Panama City Beach Parkway) with the unsigned FDOT designation SR 30A. The Panama City Beach Segment ends 16 miles (26 km) from the western terminus, as traffic on US 98/SR 30A rejoins SR 30 on the approach to the Hathaway Bridge crossing St. Andrews Bay and entering Panama City.

== SR 30A: US 98 through Panama City and Callaway ==
On the eastern approach to the Hathaway Bridge, SR 30 and US 98 separate at the corner of 18th Street and Beck Avenue in Panama City. US 98 and SR 30A continues eastward along 15th Street, passing through Cedar Grove and Springfield before a southward 90-degree turn onto North Tyndall Parkway in Callaway. As US 98/SR 30A approach the New DuPont Bridge across East Bay, its 11-mile (18 km) run ends with the merge with Business US 98/SR 30 near Long Point.

=== US 98 Business and SR 30 in Panama City and Callaway ===
While US 98/SR 30A follows 15th Street through Panama City and Callaway before reaching North Tyndall Parkway, US 98 Business and SR 30 follows Ninth Street, Beach Dr, Sixth Street, and Fifth Street before curving southward (near School Avenue) and eastward (through Parker before rejoining US 98 on the approach to the New Dupont Bridge. The merge marks the eastern terminus of the 10-mile (16 km) US 98 Business.

== Former and current SR 30A: a loop near Port St. Joe ==
After FDOT started phasing out a set of Florida State Roads in the late 1970s and early 1980s and reverted them to county maintenance, many State Roads disappeared from road maps, and many others were greatly truncated or transformed. One such drastically-affected road was SR 30A, which formed a 19-mile (31 km) loop in Gulf and Franklin counties.

Historically, SR 30A veered southward from US 98/SR 30 1 mile (1.6 km) south of Port St. Joe, near the communities of Oak Grove and Ward Ridge, and followed Sand Bar Road along the shoreline of St. Joseph Bay past the St. Joseph Point Lighthouse before turning to the east to follow the shore of Bay San Blas, Indian Lagoon, and Saint Vincent Sound before rejoining US 98/SR 30 1 mile (1.6 km) east of Nine Mile.

Today, only the north–south section is still signed SR 30A. The east–west stretch is now County Road 30A, as is a short north-south segment of Garrison Avenue in Port St. Joe.

The entire route is in Gulf County.

Location	mi	km	Destinations	Notes
	0.000	0.000	US 98 (SR 30)	
	6.661	10.720	SR 30E west (Cape San Blas Road) – Cape San Blas, St. Joseph Peninsula State Park	
1.000 mi = 1.609 km; 1.000 km = 0.621 mi
