= Deer Lake State Park =

State park in Florida, United States

- IUCN category IV (habitat/species management area)
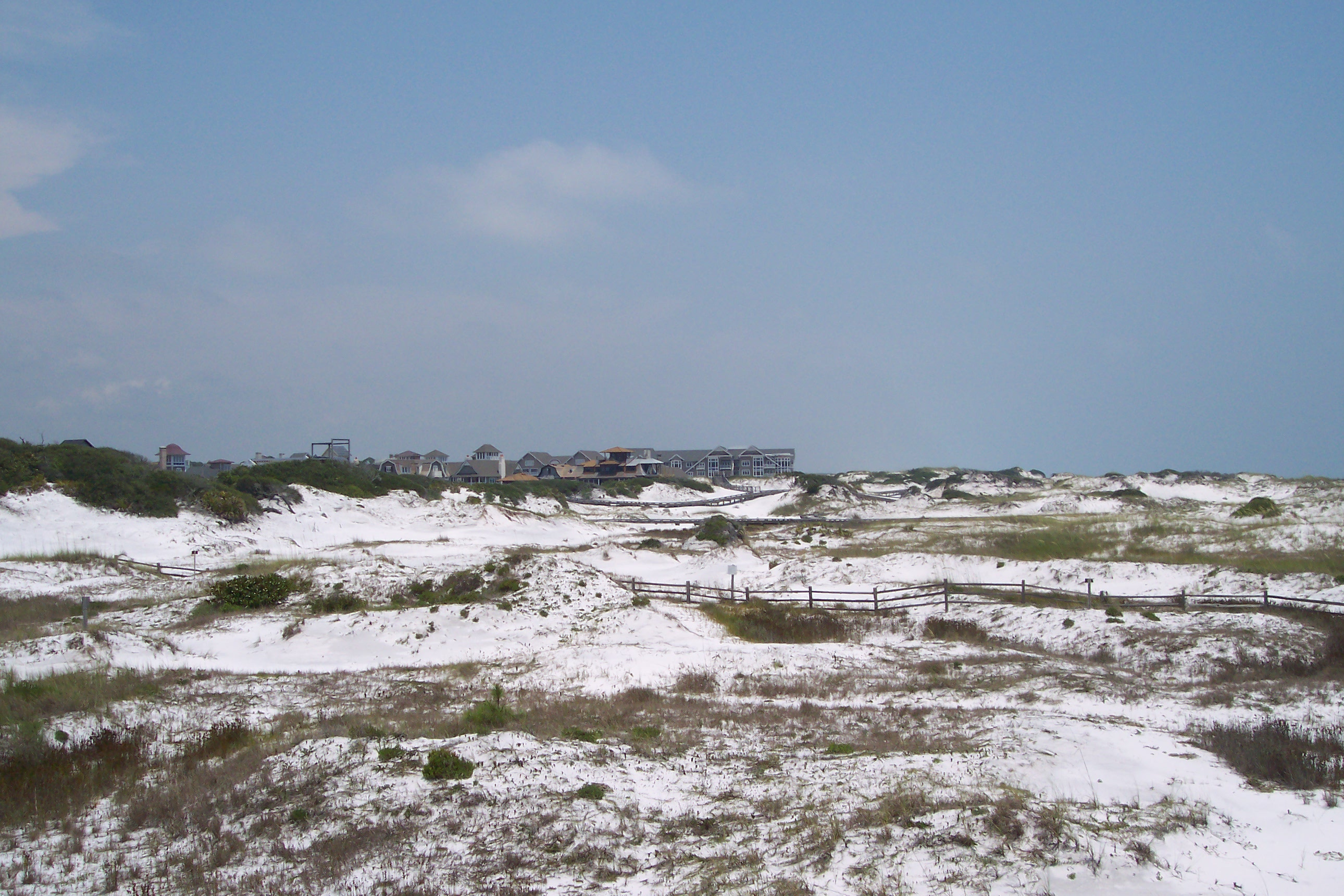

- Location within Florida Location within the United States
- Interactive map of Deer Lake State Park
- Location: Walton County, Florida, USA
- Nearest city: Grayton Beach, Florida
- Coordinates: 30°18′14″N 86°04′44″W
- Area: 2,009.44 acres (813.19 ha)
- Governing body: Florida Department of Environmental Protection

Deer Lake State Park is a Florida State Park located in Santa Rosa Beach, on CR 30A, in northwestern Florida. Its sister park is Grayton Beach State Recreation Area.

The park is named for the coastal dune lake within its boundaries. Its 11 natural communities include coastal dunes, where southern magnolias, golden asters, woody goldenrod, and scrub oaks grow.

== Recreational Activities ==
The park has such amenities as beaches, birding, fishing, picnicking areas, swimming and wildlife viewing.
