= Seacrest Beach =

Seacrest Beach may refer to:

- Seacrest Beach, Florida
- Seacrest Beach at Dover Beaches North, New Jersey
