= Topsail Hill Preserve State Park =

State park in Florida, United States

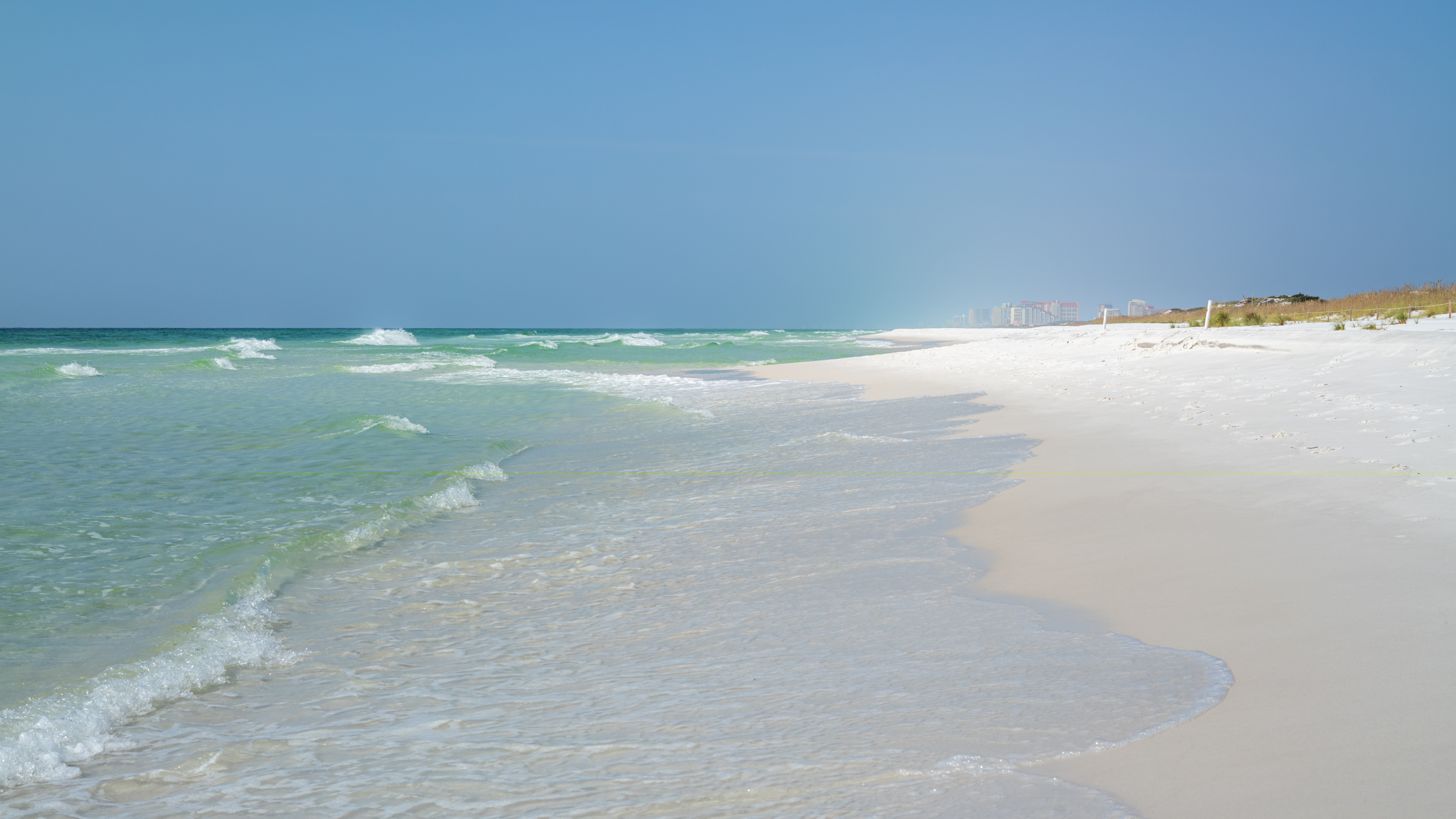
- Beachfront at the park

- Location within Florida Location within the United States
- Interactive map of Topsail Hill Preserve State Park
- Location: Walton County, Florida, United States
- Nearest city: Santa Rosa Beach
- Coordinates: 30°22′01″N 86°17′56″W
- Area: 1,637 acres (662 ha)
- Established: 1992; 34 years ago
- Governing body: Florida Department of Environmental Protection
- Website: https://www.floridastateparks.org/parks-and-trails/topsail-hill-preserve-state-park

Topsail Hill Preserve State Park is a Florida state park of about 1,637 acres (662 ha) along the Gulf of Mexico in Walton County, northwestern Florida. The park lies in Santa Rosa Beach about 10 miles (16 km) east of Destin, with entrances off U.S. 98 and Scenic Highway 30A. It is named for a prominent white-sand dune whose profile, viewed from the Gulf, was said to resemble a ship's topsail.

The park preserves about 3.2 miles (5.1 km) of undeveloped shoreline, parts of five coastal dune lakes, and roughly a dozen Florida Natural Areas Inventory natural communities that the Florida Department of Environmental Protection (FDEP) describes as one of the most intact coastal ecosystems in the state. Its dune scrub supports the largest surviving natural population of the federally endangered Choctawhatchee beach mouse (Peromyscus polionotus allophrys), and Topsail Hill has served as the donor site for every reintroduction of the subspecies to other Panhandle state parks since the late 1980s. The park was assembled in 1992 from lands originally targeted for large-scale coastal development, and in 2024 it drew national attention as one of the parks named in a subsequently withdrawn FDEP proposal to build a 350-room lodge on state-park land.

== History ==
=== Archaeology ===
Spanning as far back as Late Archaic campsites to twentieth-century military and industrial features, the Florida Master Site File lists 16 unique archaeological sites within the park boundary. Ceramics recovered at these archaeological sites came from Santa Rosa–Swift Creek and Weeden Island cultures with characteristic features such as check-stamped and fiber-tempered pottery assigned to the Elliot's Point Complex and later periods. Two prehistoric sites, Shell Midden #1 (8WL2129), a shell midden with Middle Woodland Weeden Island material and Fire Truck Crossing (8WL2569), a longer-term habitation site that contains partial vessels and Elliot's Point baked clay objects, have been evaluated as eligible for the National Register of Historic Places. Fort Walton culture shell midden (8WL64) lies partially within the park boundary at Stallworth Lake. The portion of the mound outside of the park's boundary was destroyed by residential development.

=== Turpentine and the twentieth century ===
Prior to the twentieth century, longleaf pine forests on what is now Topsail Hill were logged and tapped for naval stores by the Bullard–Stallworth Turpentine Company. A turpentine camp locally known as "the Quarters" operated in the area from the late 1800s into the mid-1900s. Turpentine cups, metal collection gutters, and V-shaped "cat face" scars from resin extraction are still visible in the northwestern part of the park (site 8WL2022). During the second World War, a metal-mesh road (site 8WL1421) was put down across roughly 0.75 miles (1.21 km) of dune to move military vehicles to a JB-2 testing facility just outside the present park. This road ran from south of Morris lake to the park's western boundary and is now also eligible for the National Register of Historic Places.

=== Acquisition ===
The state acquired the preserve in the early 1990s. The Nature Conservancy had monitored the Topsail tract for close to a decade and helped move it into public ownership after the collapse of a large private development proposal for the surrounding lands. The initial state acquisition of about 349 acres (141 ha) was completed in 1992 with money from Florida's Conservation and Recreation Lands (CARL) program and the Preservation 2000 bond program; subsequent additions expanded the site to its present size. On October 9, 1992, the Board of Trustees of the Internal Improvement Trust Fund leased the property to the FDEP Division of Recreation and Parks under a fifty-year management lease. The Gregory E. Moore RV Resort, a full-service campground on the north side of the park, was purchased and added to the park in 1998.

== Geography and geology ==
Topsail Hill Preserve occupies a stretch of the Emerald Coast between Sandestin and Grayton Beach. The site sits within the Gulf Coastal Lowlands physiographic province and is capped by Pleistocene to Holocene quartz sands. Cores near the site reveal the Intracoastal Formation (a soft, sandy, fossiliferous Pliocene limestone) about 50 feet (15 m) below the surface, overlying Bruce Creek Limestone near 100 feet (30 m) depth.

The park is entered from two points on U.S. 98: the main western entrance leads past the campground to the primary beach access, from which a tram carries visitors the last stretch to the shore, and an unpaved eastern entrance reaches the north shore of Campbell Lake.

=== Coastal dune lakes ===
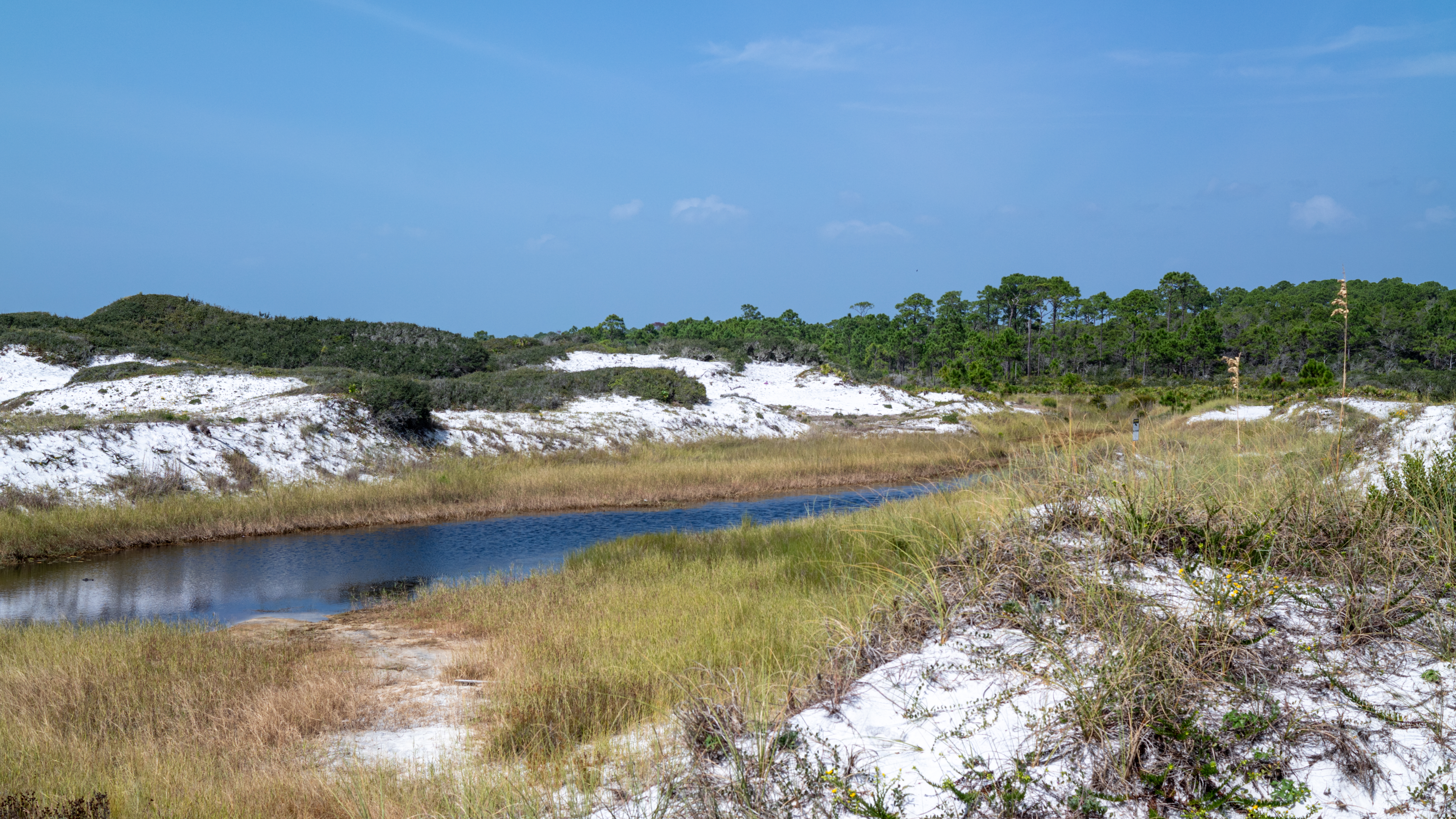
Coastal dune lake within the park

Within the park are three named coastal dune lakes which lie entirely or partially within the park: Morris Lake, about 75 acres (30 ha), Campbell Lake, about 90 acres (36 ha), and Stallworth Lake on the eastern boundary. In addition to these lakes are two smaller, unnamed bodies of water. Morris and Campbell lakes intermittently drain into the Gulf through short outfalls that open and close with rainfall and storm surge; Campbell Lake remains almost entirely fresh and rarely breaches.

Coastal dune lakes are considered globally imperiled by the Florida Natural Areas Inventory and can only be found in a handful of places in the world. These places include South Walton, the coasts of Queensland, Northland in New Zealand, and Madagascar.

=== Hurricane impacts ===
The park's Gulf shoreline is fronted by marine dune ridges and intervening swales. Before 1995, the highest dunes at the park reached about 32 feet (9.8 m) above sea level; a north–south interior ridge between Campbell and Stallworth lakes rises to about 55 feet (17 m) and is the park's highest point. The dune the park was named after, Topsail Hill, was reduced during Hurricane Opal in 1995, and the primary dune line was further eroded by Hurricane Ivan in 2004 and Hurricane Dennis in 2005, both of which overwashed the front dunes and cut blowouts through to the coastal dune lakes.

== Ecology ==
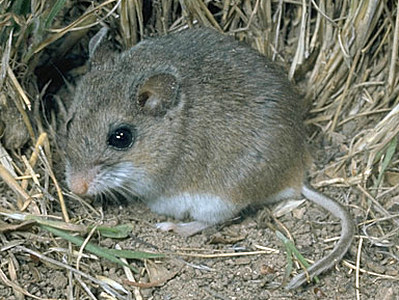
Choctawhatchee beach mouse

The Unit Management Plan (UMP) published by FDEP identifies about fourteen natural communities inside the park. These include beach dunes, coastal grasslands, sand pine scrubs, mesic and wet flatwoods, basin swamps, dome swamps, seepage slopes, and many more. Old growth longleaf pine survives in the stands that escaped early twentieth-century development and cutting, and carnivorous pitcher plants grow in the wetter seepage areas.

=== Imperiled species ===
At least thirteen imperiled animal and plant species have been documented at Topsail Hill. The most notable is the Choctawhatchee beach mouse (Peromyscus polionotus allophrys), the gopher tortoise, white-top pitcher plant, and Gulf coast lupine.The park is a designated site on the Great Florida Birding Trail.

=== Choctawhatchee beach mouse ===
Topsail Hill Preserve makes up the westernmost stronghold of the Choctawhatchee beach mouse, a subspecies of the oldfield mouse restricted to the dune systems of the Florida Panhandle and listed as endangered under the Endangered Species Act on June 6, 1985. The Florida Natural Areas Inventory (FNAI) classifies the subspecies as critically imperiled both globally and within Florida. The mouse's historical range spanned approximately 53 miles (85 km) of coastline between Destin and St. Andrews Bay; by the time it was placed on the list of protected species, only Topsail Hill and Shell Island still harbored the species.

Of the park's approximately 1,637 acres (662 ha), some 277 acres (112 ha) are mapped as beach mouse habitat, encompassing primary and secondary dunes as well as the higher scrub dunes located further inland. Genetic studies conducted by Wooten and Holler (1999) revealed that the Topsail population was markedly distinct from other existing populations of the Choctawhatchee beach mouse and identified the park as a "reservoir of unique variation" within the subspecies. The park has been the source for all reintroductions of the subspecies: individuals were relocated from Topsail Hill to the central and western units of Grayton Beach State Park in 1987, 1988, and again in 2012, to private lands adjacent to Deer Lake State Park in 2003 and 2005, and to St. Andrews State Park in 2016. Monitoring via tracking tubes, as noted in the 2019 U.S. Fish and Wildlife Service (USFWS) five-year review, determined that the Topsail Hill population has remained "relatively stable" since 2011, unlike the reintroduced populations at Grayton Beach and Deer Lake, which have experienced significant fluctuations.

Documented threats to this mouse at Topsail Hill include predation by domestic cats (both free-roaming and feral), tropical cyclones, competition and diseases transmitted by non-native house mice, artificial lighting that inhibits foraging, and, in the longer term, sea-level rise, which is projected to keep dune lake outlets open and erode dune habitat. Cat control measures have been implemented on adjacent public lands since 1996. Based on peer-reviewed studies of the Alabama beach mouse conducted after Hurricane Opal, park managers now consider tall scrub interior dunes to be a post storm refuge; they also specifically exclude coastal scrub from the park's prescribed burn program to preserve the vegetation structure upon which these mice rely when a hurricane destroys the dunes.

== Recreation ==
The park offers swimming, surfing, and freshwater fishing, hiking, cycling, and birding. Roughly 10 miles (16 km) of trails and service roads cross the park. The Morris Lake Nature Trail runs roughly 2.5 miles (4.0 km) to this lake, while the Campbell Lake Nature Trail is a longer loop of about 5 miles (8.0 km).

Overnight facilities are concentrated on the inland side of the park at the Gregory E. Moore RV Resort, which has 156 full-hookup campsites, together with furnished bungalows available for weekly or monthly visits. A tram runs on a fixed schedule between the campground and the beach.

== Management ==
The park is administered by the FDEP Division of Recreation and Parks. Its most recent unit management plan was approved in December 2019 and sets the framework for resource management, hydrological, imperiled species, prescribed fire, and public use.

=== Prescribed burns ===
There are six fire dependent communities at the park covering 576 acres (233 ha). These communities are managed by prescribed burning under an annual burn plan reviewed by the Florida Forest Service. This plan recommends burning between 101 acres (41 ha) and 210 acres (85 ha) acres each year on return intervals ranging from two to four years in wet flatwoods, wet prairie, seepage slope, and depression marsh, with 15 to 20 year intervals for scrubby flatwoods. Coastal scrub is deliberately excluded from this burn schedule because, unlik ethe interior flatwoods, this environment is not maintained by lightning-set fire. Additionally, scrub dunes serve as refuge for the Choctawhatchee beach mouse after storm events. Pitcher plants and other seepage-slope specialists benefit from regular fire in the adjacent flatwoods.

=== Controversy ===
In August 2024, FDEP released a proposed amendment to the plan under the department's "Great Outdoors Initiative." The amendment for Topsail Hill included a lodge of up to 350 rooms, a disc golf course, and pickleball courts. The proposal drew organized public opposition in Walton County and bipartisan pushback from state legislators. On August 28, 2024, Governor Ron DeSantis publicly distanced himself from the initiative, and FDEP subsequently withdrew the pending amendments and canceled the associated public meetings; the department said future changes would be revisited with local park managers.

== Reference ==
=== Bibliography ===
- Florida Department of Environmental Protection, Division of Recreation and Parks (December 2019). Topsail Hill Preserve State Park Approved Unit Management Plan (PDF) (Report). State of Florida.
- Florida Natural Areas Inventory (January 2023). Choctawhatchee Beach Mouse Peromyscus polionotus allophrys (PDF) (Report). FNAI Field Guide to the Rare Animals of Florida. Tallahassee, Florida: Florida Natural Areas Inventory.
- Florida State Parks. "Topsail Hill Preserve State Park". Florida Department of Environmental Protection.
- Friend, Sandra. "Topsail Hill Preserve State Park". Florida Hikes.
- "Florida Cabinet members alarmed by state park development plan". Florida Politics. August 22, 2024.
- "Gov. DeSantis says Florida state parks development plans not approved by him, FDEP will go 'back to the drawing board'". News4Jax. August 28, 2024.
- Sherman, Amy (August 29, 2024). "Florida state parks plans were further along than DeSantis let on". PolitiFact.
- Swilling, W. R.; Wooten, M. C.; Holler, N. R.; Lynn, W. J. (1998). "Population dynamics of Alabama beach mice (Peromyscus polionotus ammobates) following Hurricane Opal". American Midland Naturalist. 140 (2): 287–298. doi:10.1674/0003-0031(1998)140[0287:PDOABM]2.0.CO;2.
- U.S. Fish and Wildlife Service (November 15, 2019). Choctawhatchee Beach Mouse (Peromyscus polionotus allophrys) 5-Year Review: Summary and Evaluation (PDF) (Report). Yanchis, K. Panama City, Florida: Panama City Ecological Services Field Office.
- "How the DEP Great Outdoors Initiative is impacting local state parks". WJHG. August 22, 2024.
- "Florida residents rally to save Topsail Hill Preserve State Park from development, urge state to 'back off'". WPTV. August 27, 2024.
