= Eden Gardens State Park =

Park and historic mansion in Florida, U.S.

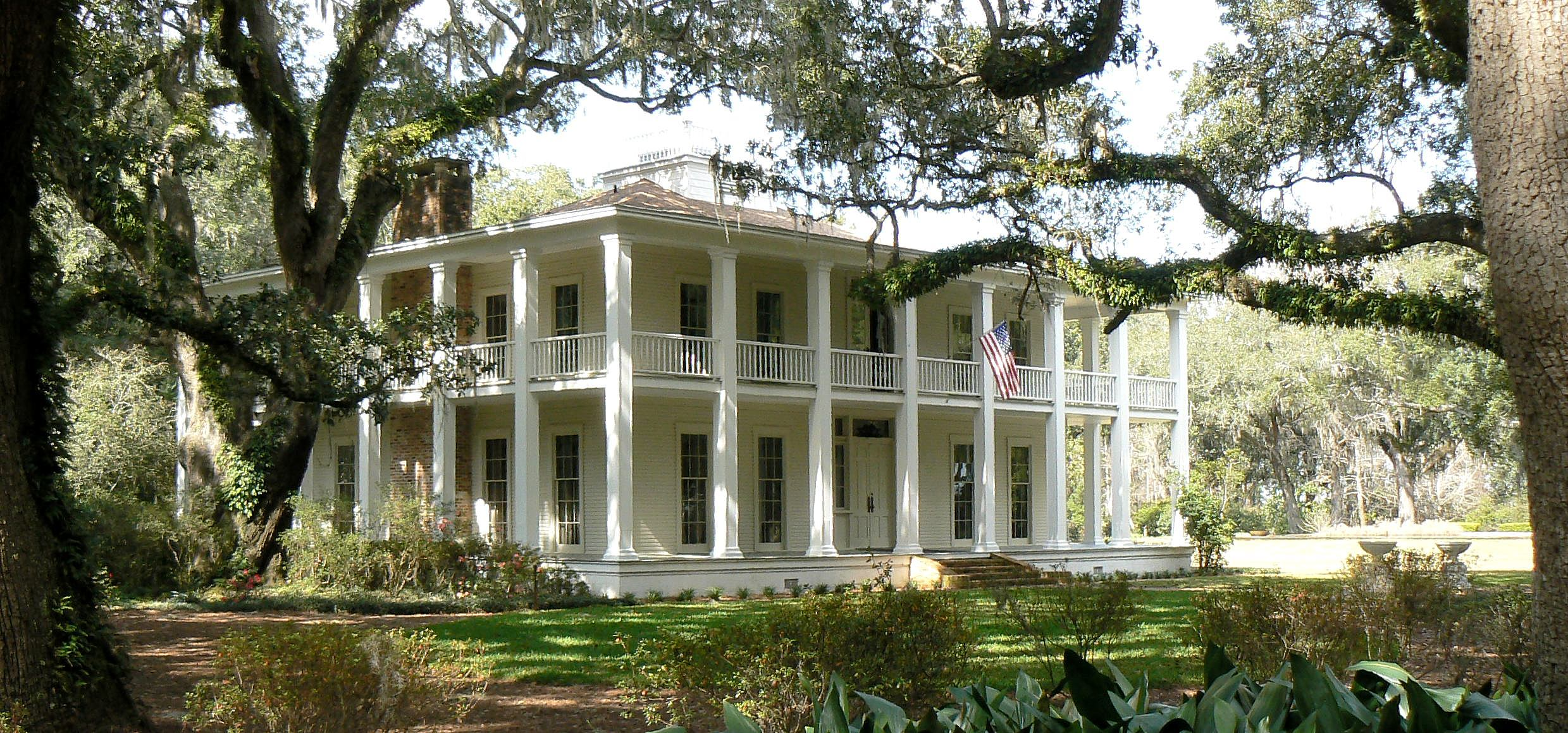
- The Wesley House, at Eden Gardens State Park

- Location within Florida
- Interactive map of Eden Gardens State Park
- Location: Walton County, Florida, U.S.
- Nearest city: Freeport, Florida
- Coordinates: 30.36574951516643°N 86.12050016073127°W
- Area: 161.04 acres (65.17 ha)
- Established: 1968; 58 years ago
- Owner: Florida Department of Environmental Protection
- Eden Gardens State Park
- U.S. National Register of Historic Places
- Built: 1897
- NRHP reference No.: 100006749
- Added to NRHP: July 20, 2021

Eden Gardens State Park is a 161.04 acres (65.17 ha) Florida State Park and historic site located in Point Washington, south of Freeport, off U.S. 98 on CR 395, in northwestern Florida at 181 Eden Gardens Road (CR 395) in Santa Rosa Beach. The park is centered on the Wesley House, a two-story mansion virtually surrounded by white columns and verandas. The house is notable for its furnishings, especially examples of late 18th century French furniture. The house was also used as the setting of the 1972 horror film Frogs. The Wesley House was added to the National Register of Historic Places as Eden Mansion on July 20, 2021. The site has various gardens, numerous large, old southern live oak trees, and frontage on Tucker Bayou.

The park opens daily at 8:00 am and closes at sunset. An entry fee is required.

== Recreational activities ==
The park's amenities include a historic 1897 house filled with antiques where tours are given from 10:00 am through 3:00 p.m. on the hour, every hour, Thursday through Monday (the house is closed on Tuesdays and Wednesdays for maintenance). There are ornamental gardens with heritage roses, camellias, azaleas, as well as a butterfly garden and a reflection pond filled with water lilies and large koi. For those that like the more natural look, there are nature trails as well as picnic areas and a fishing dock.

Those with paddle-craft can enter Tucker Bayou or venture out to the Choctawhatchee Bay. There is an Annual Camellia Festival held in February and a Christmas Luminary Event is held before Christmas. Easter events are also held.

== Event venue ==
This park is able to be reserved for special events, such as reunions, photo sessions, and weddings.

== Friends of Eden Gardens ==
The “Friends of Eden Gardens State Park” was founded as a volunteer organization to assist the state park staff in repairing, maintaining and enhancing the park.

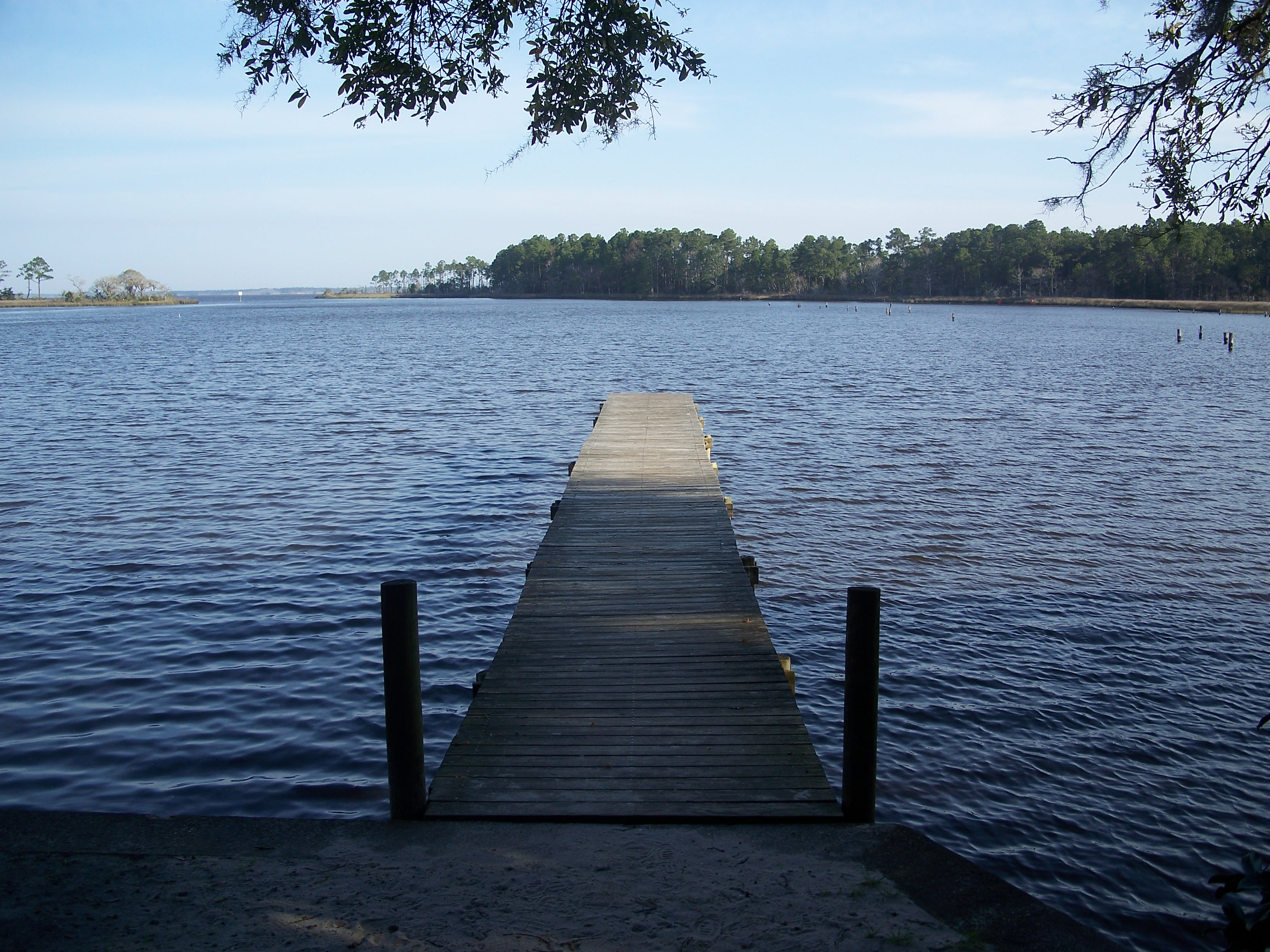
Bayou

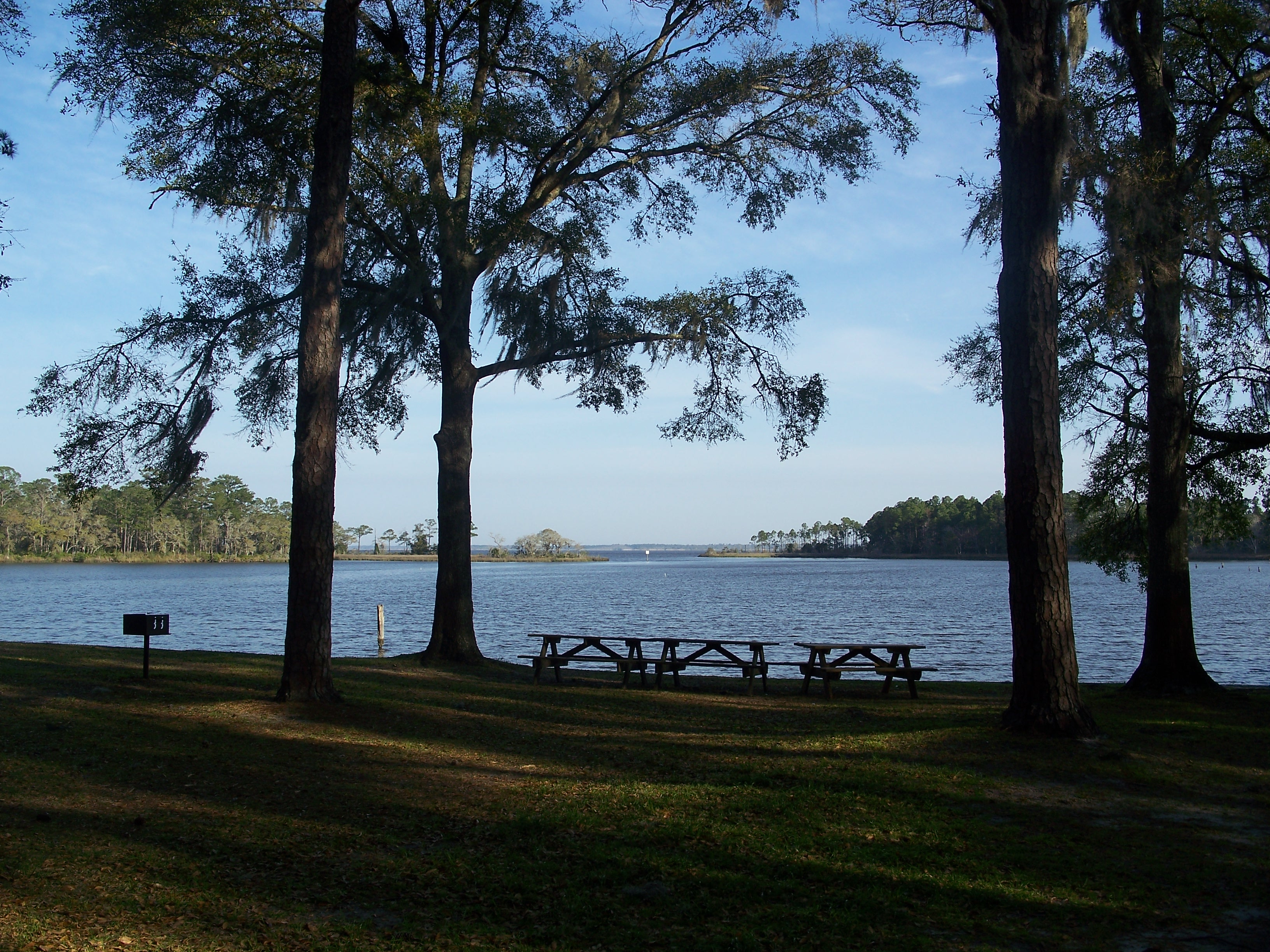
Another view of the bayou

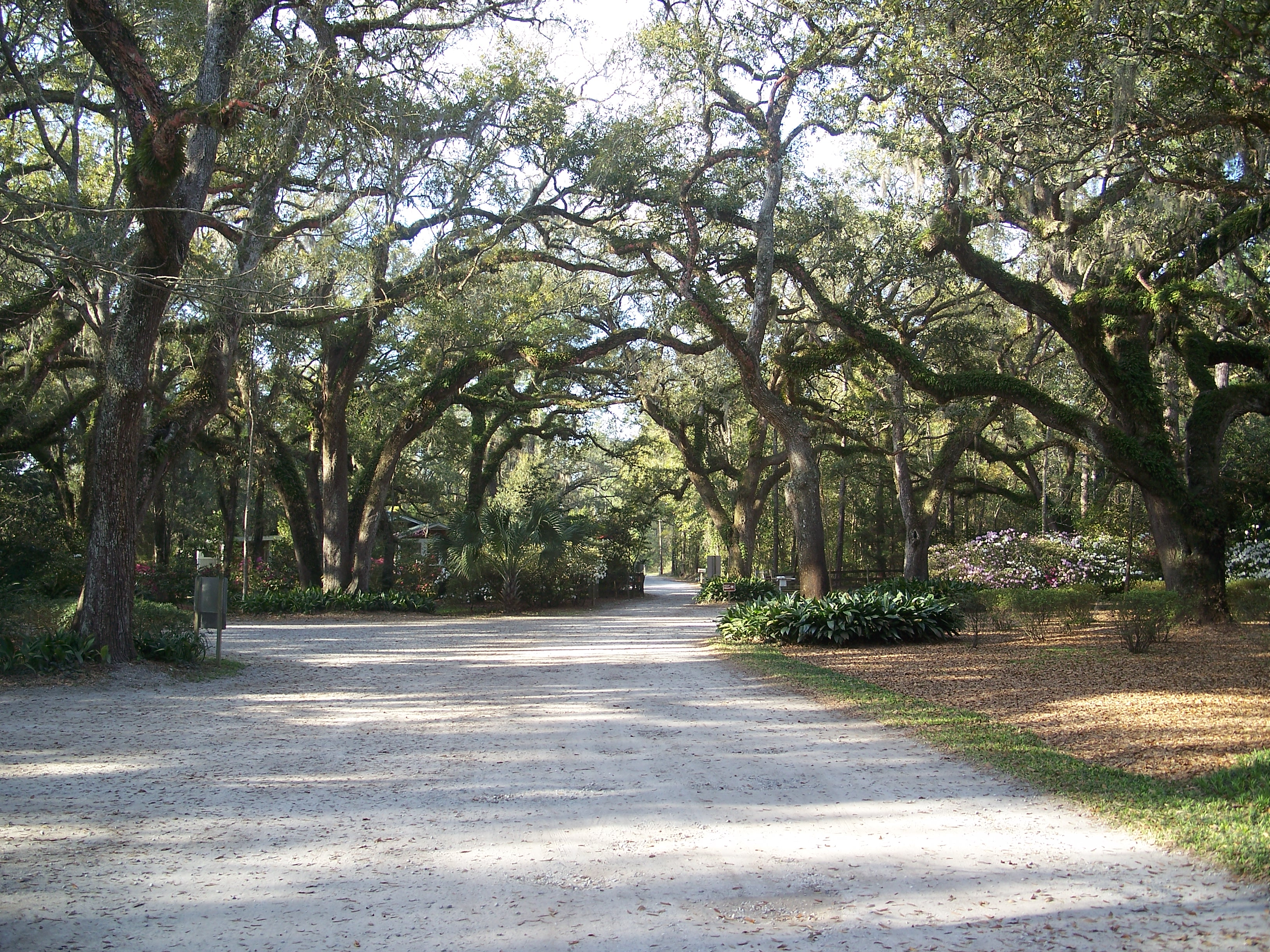
Entrance

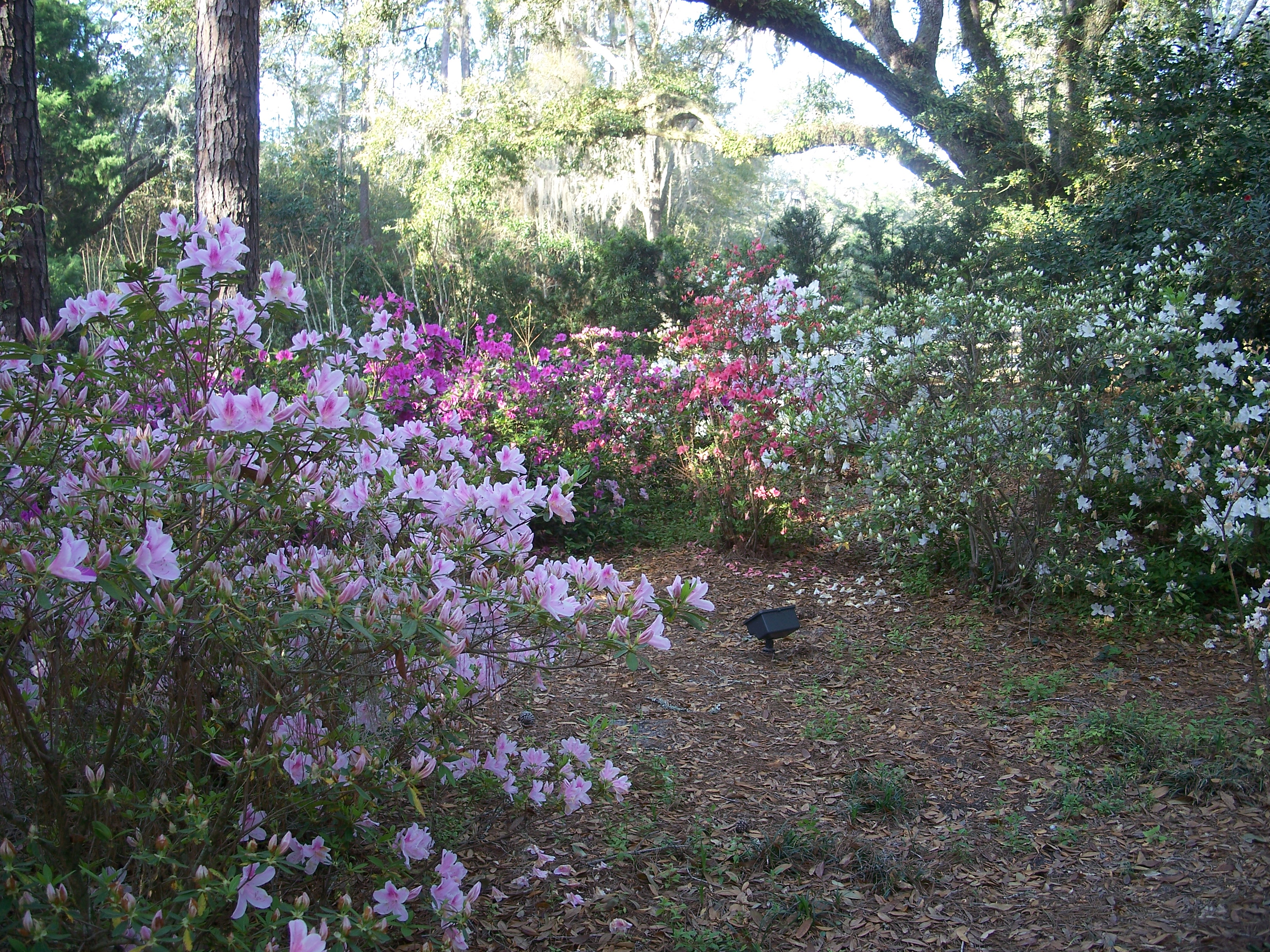
Flowers

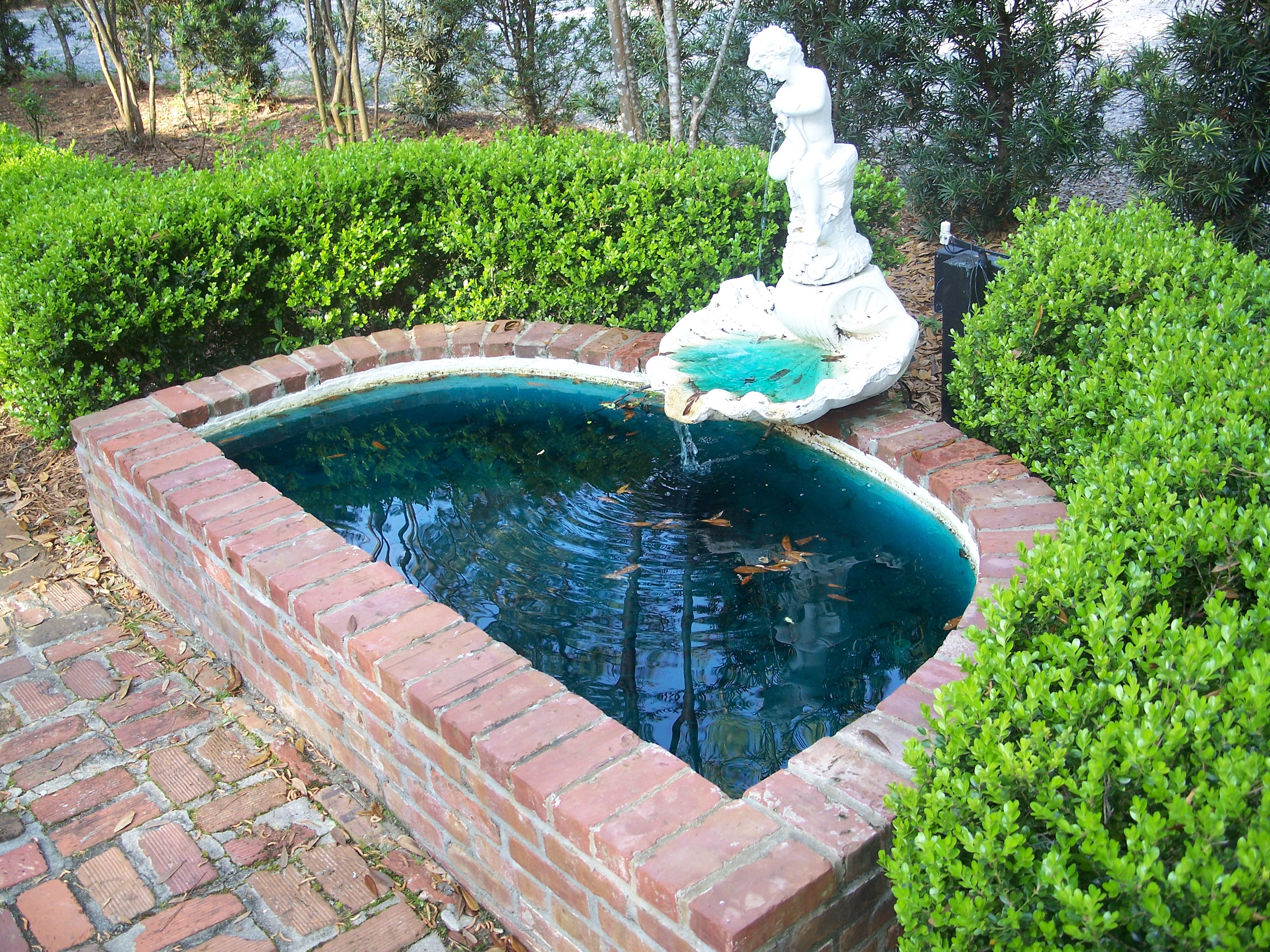
Fountain

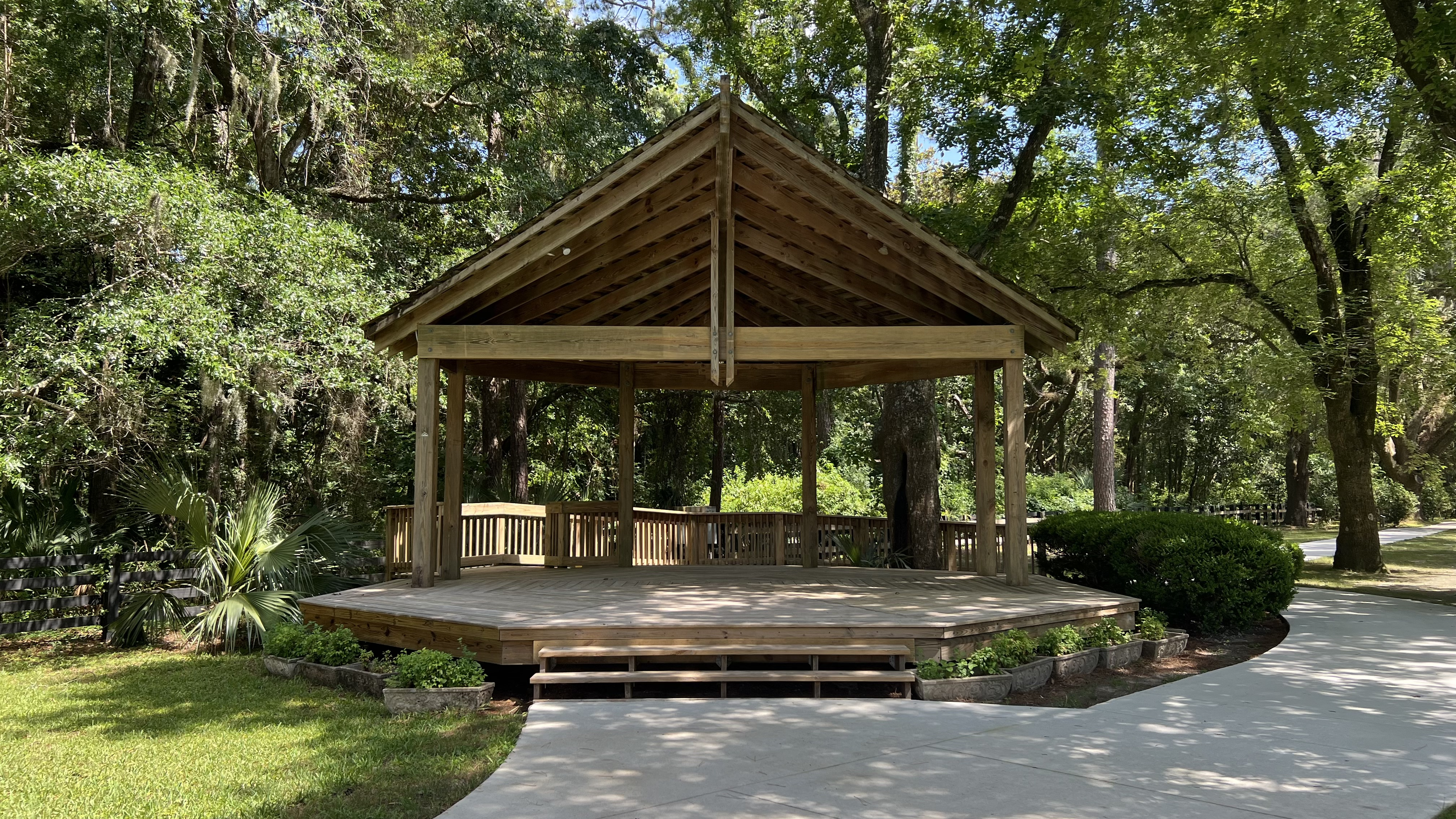
Outdoor Stage

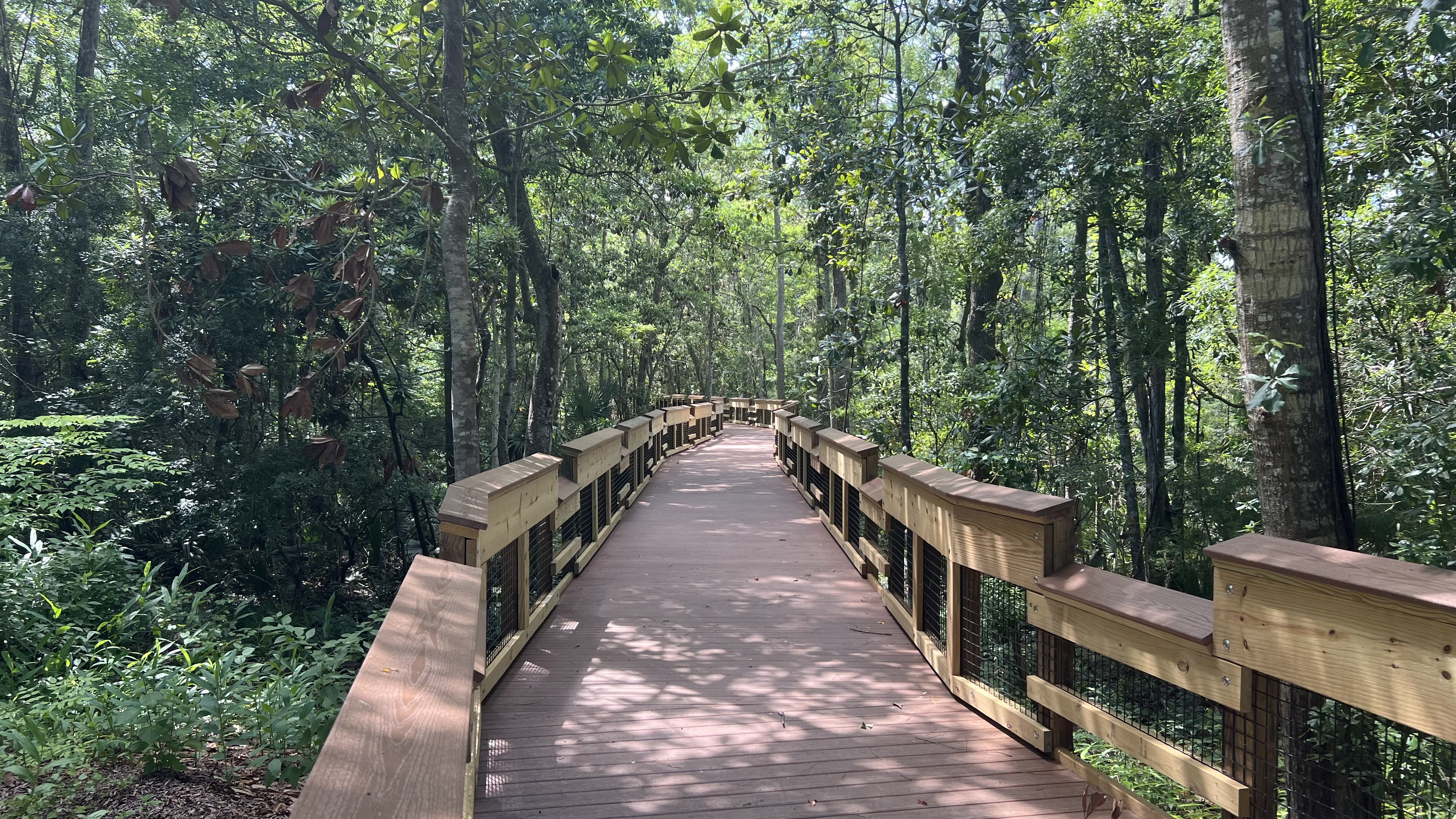
Hiking Trail

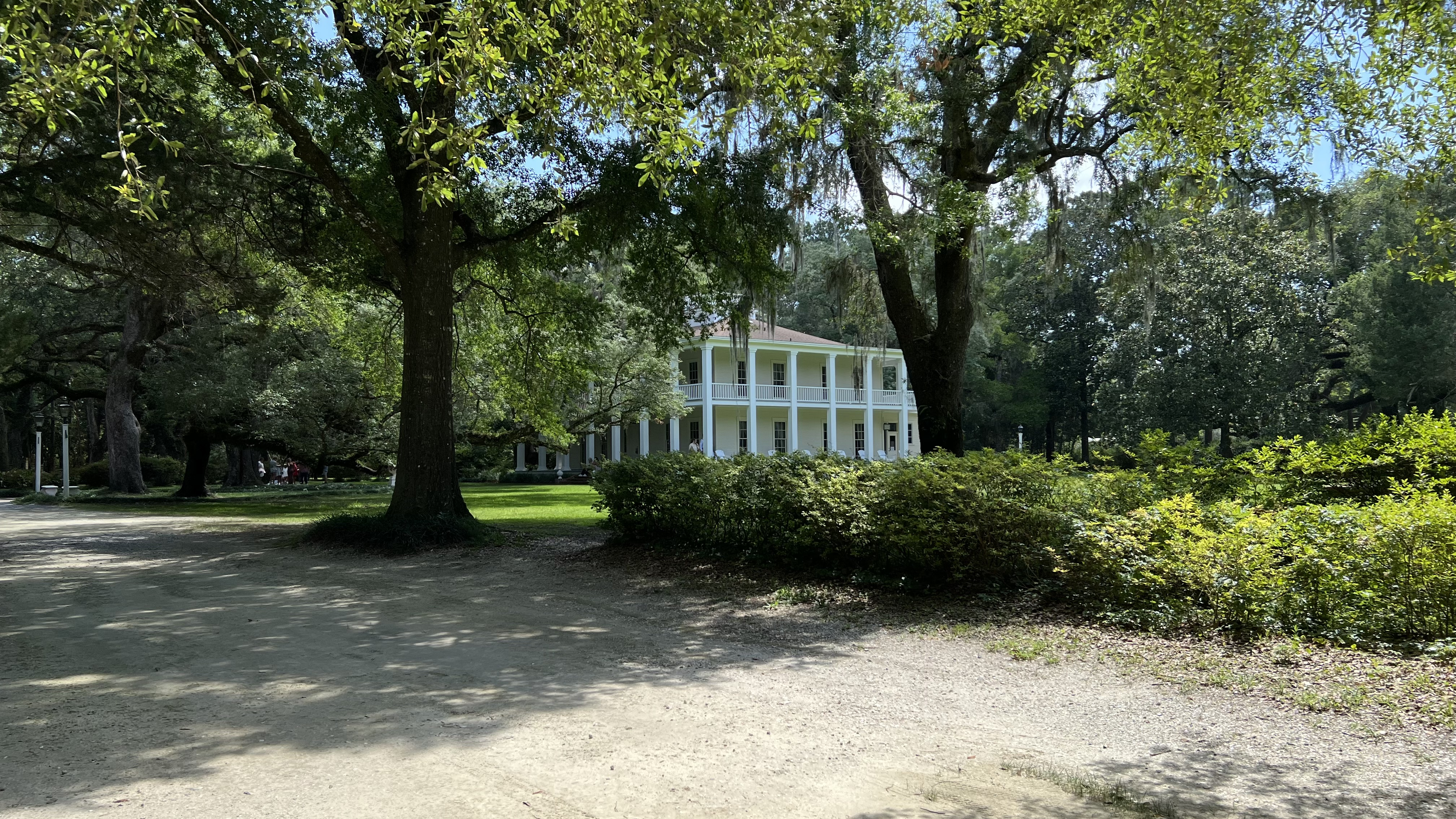
Rear view of the Wesley House

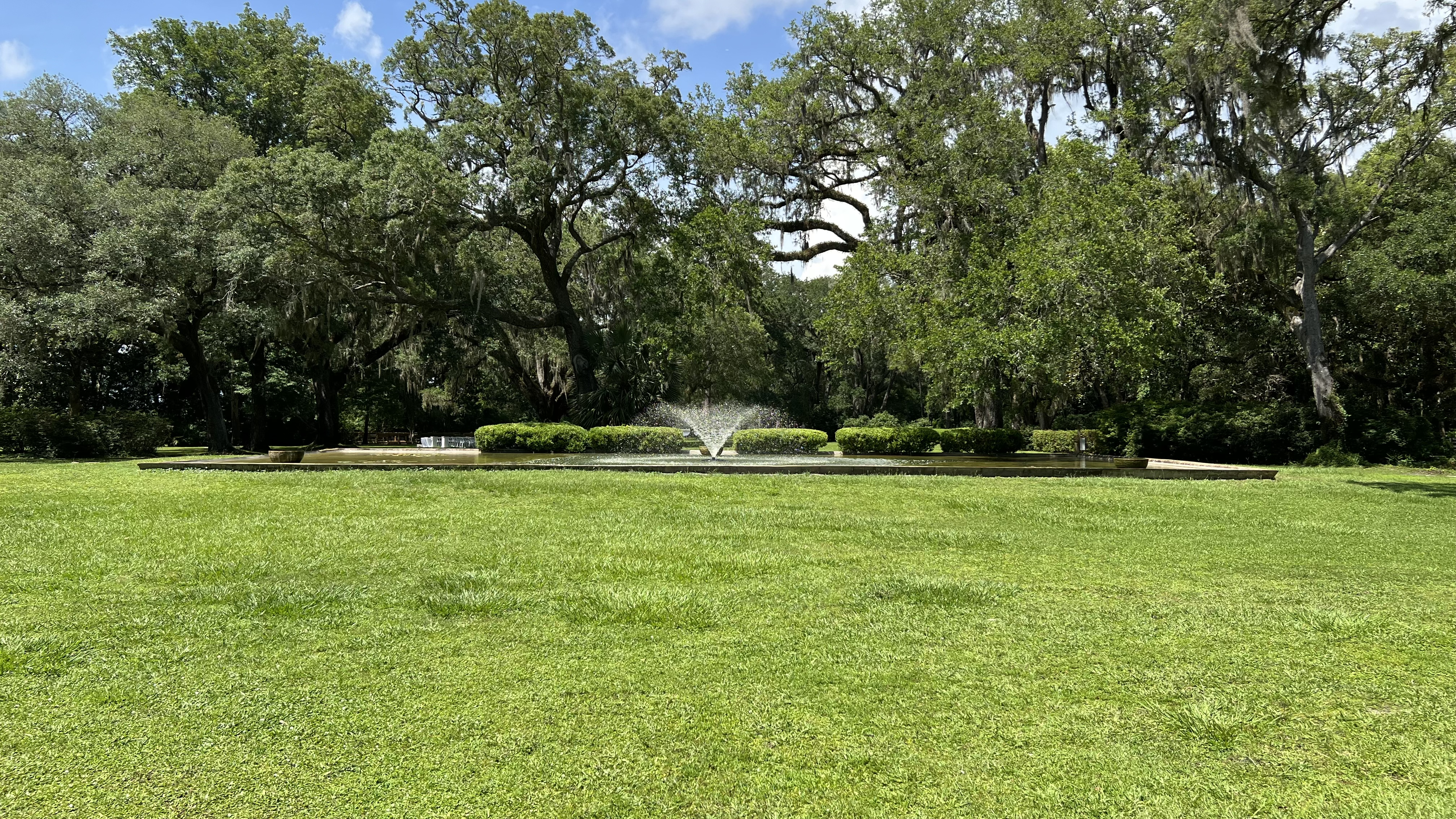
Courtyard Fountain
