= WaterColor, Florida =

- Unincorporated community
- Interactive map of WaterColor, Florida
- Coordinates: 30°19′21″N 86°08′45″W
- Country: United States
- State: Florida
- County: Walton

Area
  - Total: 499 acres (202 ha)
- Elevation: 3.3 ft (1 m)
- Time zone: UTC-6 (Central (CST))
  - Summer (DST): UTC-5 (CDT)
- ZIP code: 32459

WaterColor is an unincorporated master-planned community located in Walton County, Florida, United States, between Grayton Beach and Seaside. This 499-acre (202 ha) Southern resort and residential community was planned by Cooper, Robertson & Partners under the direction of The St. Joe Company.
