= Seacrest, Florida =

Human settlement in the United States

Coordinates: 30°17′01″N 86°02′30″W

Seacrest
- Unincorporated community
- Located in Walton County, FL

Population https://www.point2homes.com/US/Neighborhood/FL/Walton-Beaches/Seacrest-Rosemary-Beach-Demographics.html
  - Total: 8,567
- Time zone: UTC-5 (Eastern Standard Time)

Seacrest and Seacrest Beach are unincorporated communities located along County Road 30A in Walton County, Florida, United States.
