= Sean Dietrich =

American writer of books and newspaper columns

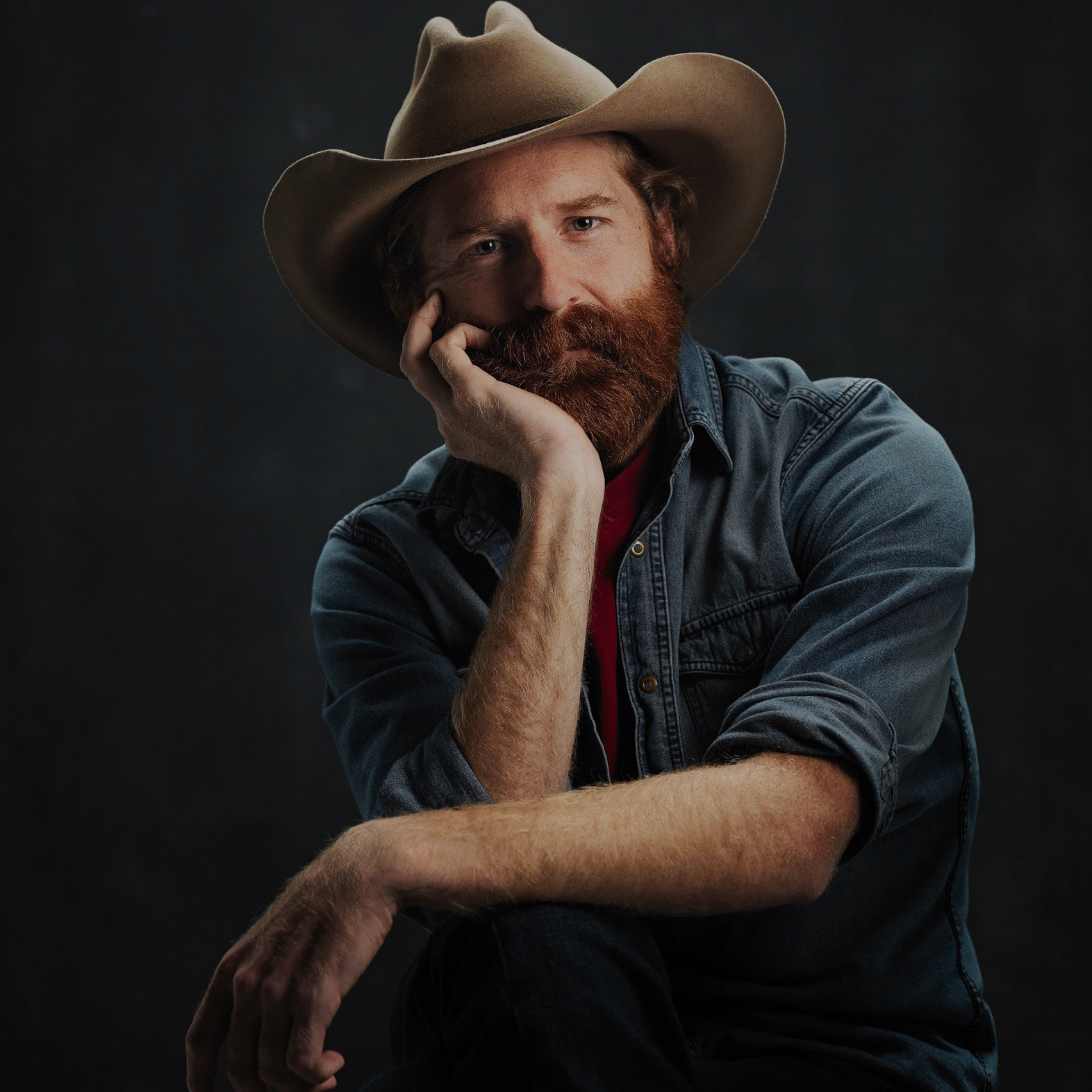
- Born: Sean Paul Dietrich; December 29, 1982 (age 43); Kansas City, Missouri
- Years active: 2014-present
- Website: https://seandietrich.com/

Sean Dietrich, nicknamed "Sean of the South", is an American writer of books and newspaper columns. His focus is on the Southern United States and its people.

Dietrich was born in Kansas City, Missouri but after his father's suicide, when he was twelve years old, he moved with his family to Walton County, Florida, at age 14. He dropped out of school and worked construction and other jobs, then became a professional musician. After going back to school he discovered writing. He has published more than ten books (some of them self-published), and has written columns for the Mobile Press Register, Tallahassee Democrat, and The Bitter Southerner. He lives in Birmingham, Alabama, and has gained a following, especially in Alabama (his wife Jamie is a chef from Brewton, Alabama) and identifies with its people.

Since 2014 he has written a blog called "Sean of the South". He writes a blog entry every day read by an estimated 125,000 people. Dietrich has written more than 1,500 columns which have been published in seven books. Don Noble, professor of American literature and critic who reviewed Whistling Dixie, praised the funny and quirky titles and the uplifting spirit of the 500-word pieces, though he noted that one should read only one a day, "any more gets cloying".

== Works ==
=== Fiction ===
- Lyla (2014)
- The Other Side of the Bay (2015)
- Stars of Alabama (2019)
- The Incredible Winston Browne (2021)
- You Are My Sunshine (2022)
- Kinfolk (2023)
- Over Yonder (2025)

=== Short story collections ===
- Sean of the South: Volume 1 (2015)
- Sean of the South: Volume 2 (2015)
- Sean of the South: Whistling Dixie (2015)
- Small Towns, Labradors, Barbecue, Biscuits, Beer, and Bibles (2016)
- On the Road with Sean of the South (2016)
- Caution: This Vehicle Makes Frequent Stops For Boiled Peanuts (2016)
- The South's Okayest Writer: The Adventures of a Boy Columnist (2018)
- The Absolute Worst Christmas of All Time (2020)

=== Memoir ===
- Will the Circle be Unbroken? (2020)
