= Point Washington, Florida =

Unincorporated community in Florida, U.S.

Coordinates: 30°22′13″N 86°06′54″W

Point Washington is an unincorporated community in Walton County, Florida, United States. Its zip code is: 32459. The area is home to Eden Gardens State Park. The park is located south of Freeport by U.S. 98. The community developed around a sawmill. Point Washington State Forest was purchased under Florida's Conservation and Recreation Lands (CARL) program in 1992. Using an ecosystem management approach, the Florida Forest Service provides for multiple uses of the forest resources. The forest is managed for timber, wildlife, outdoor recreation and ecological restoration. Point Washington is widely used for hunting, off-road bicycling, and hiking. On the area are several paved roads and numerous forest roads. This area is a site on the Great Florida Birding Trail.
