= Inlet Beach, Florida =

Beach in Florida, United States

Coordinates: 30°16′37″N 86°00′29″W

Inlet Beach is located in south Walton and Bay Counties in Florida, with the eastern most edge being in Bay County at the state park. Inlet Beach is the most eastern South Walton County beach and is named after Phillips Inlet.

The use of the name Inlet Beach antedates World War II.

Much of the land was distributed through a lottery system to World War II veterans, and was sometimes known as "Soldiers Beach" or "Veterans Beach".
