= Walton County, Florida =

County in Florida, United States

- County
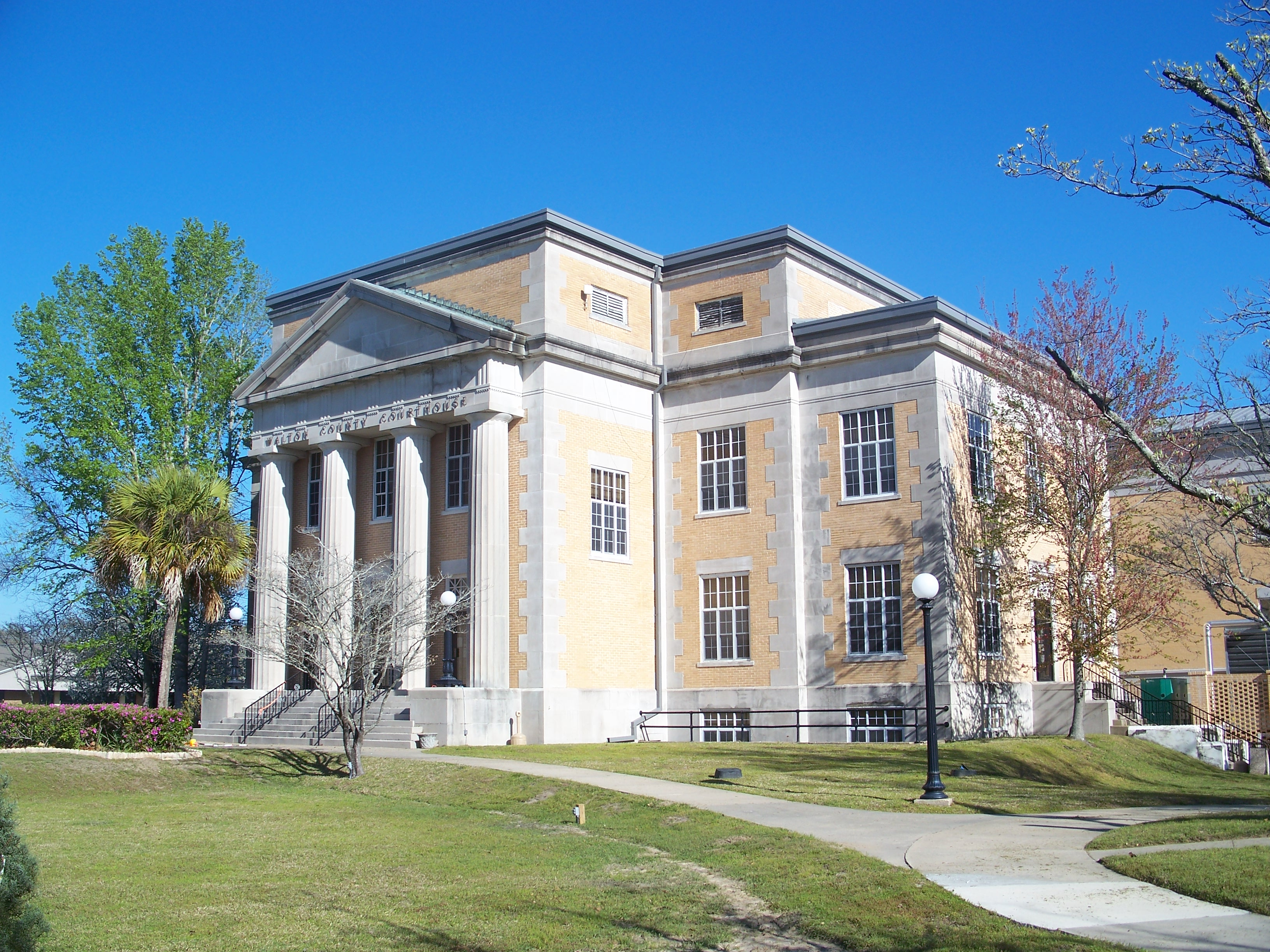
- Walton County Courthouse

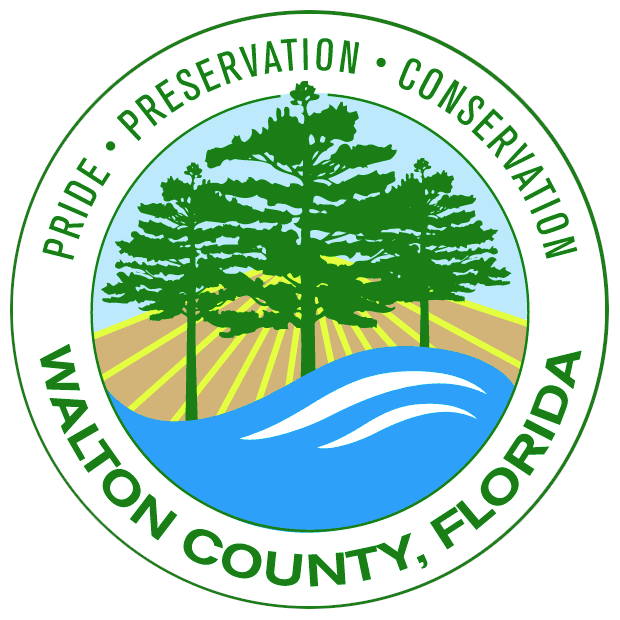
- Flag Seal

- Location within the U.S. state of Florida
- Coordinates: 30°37′N 86°10′W
- Country: United States
- State: Florida
- Founded: December 29, 1824
- Named for: George Walton Jr.
- Seat: DeFuniak Springs
- Largest community: Miramar Beach

Area
  - Total: 1,240 sq mi (3,200 km^{2})
  - Land: 1,038 sq mi (2,690 km^{2})
  - Water: 202 sq mi (520 km^{2}) 16.3%

Population (2020)
  - Total: 75,305
  - Estimate (2025): 93,288 ▲
  - Density: 72.55/sq mi (28.01/km^{2})
- Time zone: UTC−6 (Central)
  - Summer (DST): UTC−5 (CDT)
- Congressional districts: 1st, 2nd
- Website: www.mywaltonfl.gov

Walton County is a county located on the Emerald Coast in the northwestern part of the U.S. state of Florida, with its southern border on the Gulf of Mexico. As of the 2020 census, the population was 75,305. Its county seat is DeFuniak Springs. The county is home to the highest natural point in Florida: Britton Hill, at 345 feet (105 m). Walton County is included in the Crestview–Fort Walton Beach–Destin Metropolitan Statistical Area.

== History ==
Walton County was organized in 1824. It was named for Colonel George Walton Jr., secretary of the Florida Territory from 1821 to 1826. Walton, the son of George Walton, a signer of the Declaration of Independence, was born August 15, 1786, in Augusta, Georgia, and died March 20, 1859, in Petersburg, Virginia.

Between 1763 and 1783 the territory that has since become Walton County was part of the colony of British West Florida. During this time British settlers permanently settled in the area, becoming the first English-speaking people to permanently reside in what is now Walton County. During this period Scottish settlers migrated from the backcountry of the Carolinas and settled in the Defuniak Springs area while English settlers, most of whom were either farmers or fishermen, settled in the southern portion of the county by the sea, settling throughout the area that has since become Santa Rosa Beach, Sandestin, Miramar Beach, Point Washington, Seaside and Topsail Hill Preserve State Park and Point Washington State Forest.

While the Scottish settlers had come from a recently established Scottish-majority settlement in North Carolina, the English settlers came largely from the English regions of Norfolk, Dorset and the western half of Sussex. Both the Scots village in the northern portion of the county and the English community along the coast were largely self-contained and had economies that were entirely operational without external trade, as all products in use were made within the two respective communities, and the only external trade was between the Scots in Defuniak Springs and the English farmers/fishermen by the coast. Neither community exported the goods they produced for profit, nor did they have any imported goods at all as both communities relied on self-produced subsistence agriculture. The original settlements were in the Euchee (Yuchi) Valley, near the landing on the Choctawhatchee River that was maintained by a mixed-race Yuchi named Sam Story, whose mother was Yuchi and father was an early Scots trader in the area. The white settlers founded one of the first Presbyterian churches in Northwest Florida. It is still an operating parish and has a historical cemetery.

When the Spanish regained control of Florida in 1783, roughly two-thirds of the British settlers in Pensacola left the colony to find permanent habitation elsewhere, including in the Bahamas and Bermuda, however none of the English or Scottish settlers in what has since become Walton County left with them. The Spanish came to regard the English and Scottish settlers in what has since become Walton County as "stubborn" and "ungovernable" as the Spanish were unable to make them obey Spanish law. They unanimously refused to convert to Catholicism, despite the fact that Spanish law said they were only allowed to remain in Florida if they did so and the Spanish were unable to compel them to pay taxes to the local Spanish government. As settlers from the newly created United States of America began migrating into north Florida the English and Scottish settlers in what has since become Walton County became gradually absorbed into this community, which would subsequently become the majority population in North Florida.

In 1860, there were roughly 573 military aged men in Walton County. Of that population, 62, or 11%, went to serve in the Union unit, the 1st Florida Cavalry Regiment that was mustered in on October 29, 1863. The first Confederate monument in Florida, located at the Walton County Courthouse, records the names of 94 soldiers who died fighting for the Confederacy.

In 1995, three planned communities designed by Andrés Duany and Elizabeth Plater-Zyberk of the Duany Plater-Zyberk & Company were founded. The communities, named Alys Beach, Seaside, and Rosemary Beach are examples of a style of urban planning known as New Urbanism. The final plan for Seaside was complete around 1985.

Seaside was used as the main filming location of the 1998 film The Truman Show.

== Geography ==
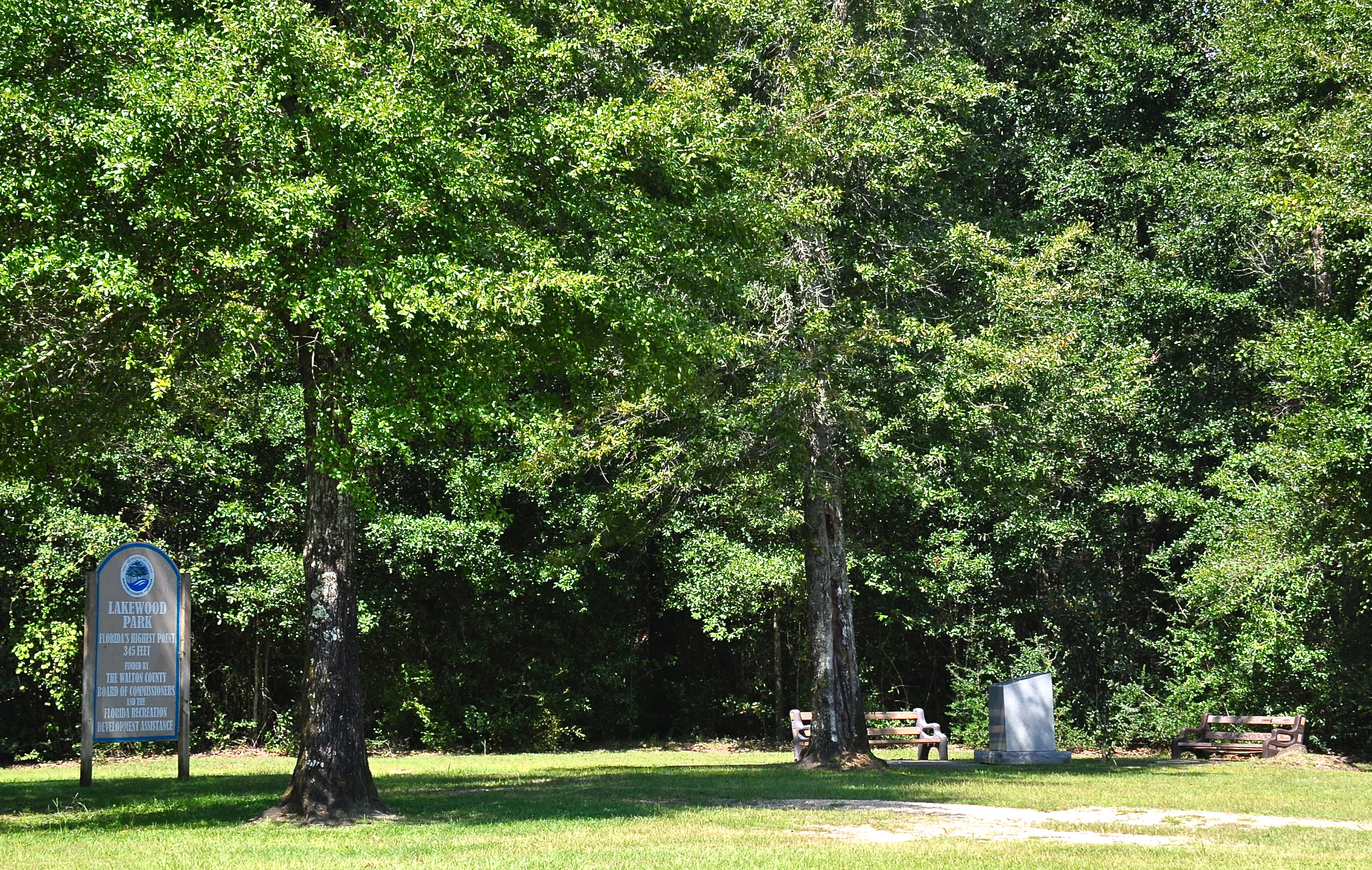
Britton Hill, Florida's highest point at 345 feet (105 m), is located in northern Walton County

According to the U.S. Census Bureau, the county has a total area of 1,240 square miles (3,200 km^{2}), of which 1,038 square miles (2,690 km^{2}) is land and 202 square miles (520 km^{2}) (16.3%) is water. The county is 12th largest in area in the state, stretching from the Alabama state line to the Emerald Coast.

=== Adjacent counties ===
- Covington County, Alabama – northwest
- Geneva County, Alabama – northeast
- Holmes County – east
- Washington County – east
- Bay County – southeast
- Okaloosa County – west

=== National protected areas ===
- Choctawhatchee National Forest (part)
- Point Washington State Forest (part)

== Demographics ==
Historical population
Census	Pop.	Note	%±
1830	1,207		—
1840	1,461		21.0%
1850	1,817		24.4%
1860	3,037		67.1%
1870	3,041		0.1%
1880	4,201		38.1%
1890	4,816		14.6%
1900	9,346		94.1%
1910	16,460		76.1%
1920	12,119		−26.4%
1930	14,576		20.3%
1940	14,246		−2.3%
1950	14,725		3.4%
1960	15,576		5.8%
1970	16,087		3.3%
1980	21,300		32.4%
1990	27,760		30.3%
2000	40,601		46.3%
2010	55,043		35.6%
2020	75,305		36.8%
2025 (est.)	93,288	▲	23.9%
U.S. Decennial Census; 1790-1960 1900-1990; 1990-2000 2010-2015 2019 2020

=== Racial and ethnic composition ===
Walton County, Florida – Racial and ethnic composition Note: the US Census treats Hispanic/Latino as an ethnic category. This table excludes Latinos from the racial categories and assigns them to a separate category. Hispanics/Latinos may be of any race.
Race / Ethnicity (NH = Non-Hispanic)	Pop 1980	Pop 1990	Pop 2000	Pop 2010	Pop 2020	% 1980	% 1990	% 2000	% 2010	% 2020
White alone (NH)	18,767	25,114	35,425	46,857	60,644	88.11%	90.47%	87.25%	85.13%	80.53%
Black or African American alone (NH)	2,035	1,870	2,801	3,147	3,294	9.55%	6.74%	6.90%	5.72%	4.37%
Native American or Alaska Native alone (NH)	218	412	486	463	415	1.02%	1.48%	1.20%	0.84%	0.55%
Asian alone (NH)	71	117	175	491	907	0.33%	0.42%	0.43%	0.89%	1.20%
Native Hawaiian or Pacific Islander alone (NH)	x	x	14	37	38	x	x	0.03%	0.07%	0.05%
Other race alone (NH)	36	3	42	62	307	0.17%	0.01%	0.10%	0.11%	0.41%
Mixed race or Multiracial (NH)	x	x	778	1,065	3,513	x	x	1.92%	1.93%	4.67%
Hispanic or Latino (any race)	173	244	880	2,921	6,187	0.81%	0.88%	2.17%	5.31%	8.22%
Total	21,300	27,760	40,601	55,043	75,305	100.00%	100.00%	100.00%	100.00%	100.00%

=== 2020 census ===
As of the 2020 census, the county had a population of 75,305, 29,981 households, and 20,034 families.

The median age was 44.5 years. 20.4% of residents were under the age of 18 and 20.3% of residents were 65 years of age or older. For every 100 females there were 102.2 males, and for every 100 females age 18 and over there were 102.0 males age 18 and over.

The racial makeup of the county was 82.1% White, 4.4% Black or African American, 0.7% American Indian and Alaska Native, 1.2% Asian, 0.1% Native Hawaiian and Pacific Islander, 3.8% from some other race, and 7.6% from two or more races. Hispanic or Latino residents of any race comprised 8.2% of the population.

43.9% of residents lived in urban areas, while 56.1% lived in rural areas.

There were 29,981 households in the county, of which 27.0% had children under the age of 18 living in them. Of all households, 52.6% were married-couple households, 17.5% were households with a male householder and no spouse or partner present, and 23.6% were households with a female householder and no spouse or partner present. About 26.2% of all households were made up of individuals and 11.4% had someone living alone who was 65 years of age or older.

There were 56,197 housing units, of which 46.7% were vacant. Among occupied housing units, 76.3% were owner-occupied and 23.7% were renter-occupied. The homeowner vacancy rate was 3.0% and the rental vacancy rate was 43.3%.

=== 2000 census ===
As of the 2000 census, there were 40,601 people, 16,548 households, and 11,120 families residing in the county. The population density was 38 people per square mile (15 people/km^{2}). There were 29,083 housing units at an average density of 28 per square mile (11/km^{2}). The racial makeup of the county was 88.41% White, 6.98% Black or African American, 1.28% Native American, 0.45% Asian, 0.04% Pacific Islander, 0.75% from other races, and 2.09% from two or more races. 2.17% of the population were Hispanic or Latino of any race.

There were 16,548 households, out of which 26.40% had children under the age of 18 living with them, 53.00% were married couples living together, 10.10% had a female householder with no husband present, and 32.80% were non-families. 27.10% of all households were made up of individuals, and 10.10% had someone living alone who was 65 years of age or older. The average household size was 2.35 and the average family size was 2.83.

In the county, the population was spread out, with 21.70% under the age of 18, 7.10% from 18 to 24, 28.50% from 25 to 44, 26.90% from 45 to 64, and 15.80% who were 65 years of age or older. The median age was 40 years. For every 100 females there were 105.20 males. For every 100 females age 18 and over, there were 105.00 males.

The median income for a household in the county was $32,407, and the median income for a family was $37,663. Males had a median income of $26,799 versus $21,208 for females. The per capita income for the county was $18,198. About 11.60% of families and 14.40% of the population were below the poverty line, including 21.00% of those under age 18 and 10.90% of those age 65 or over.

== Government ==
=== County government ===
Position	Name	Party
Commissioner, District 1	Dan Curry	Republican
Commissioner, District 2	Danny Glidewell	Republican
Commissioner, District 3	Brad Drake	Republican
Commissioner, District 4	Donna Johns	Republican
Commissioner, District 5	Tony Anderson	Republican

=== Politics ===
Walton County was one of the earliest parts of the South to break away from "Solid South" Democratic voting. Like most of the western Panhandle, it has become a stronghold of the Republican Party. It has supported the Republican candidate in each presidential election since 1980 and all but twice since 1964, usually by overwhelming margins.

United States presidential election results for Walton County, Florida
Year	Republican		Democratic		Third party(ies)	
Year	No.	%	No.	%	No.	%
1904	322	42.65%	354	46.89%	79	10.46%
1908	369	37.96%	504	51.85%	99	10.19%
1912	74	7.01%	612	57.95%	370	35.04%
1916	549	37.14%	753	50.95%	176	11.91%
1920	619	30.66%	1,297	64.24%	103	5.10%
1924	220	18.77%	825	70.39%	127	10.84%
1928	1,475	61.36%	908	37.77%	21	0.87%
1932	305	10.96%	2,477	89.04%	0	0.00%
1936	510	15.51%	2,778	84.49%	0	0.00%
1940	694	17.74%	3,217	82.26%	0	0.00%
1944	689	21.15%	2,569	78.85%	0	0.00%
1948	652	17.16%	2,366	62.28%	781	20.56%
1952	1,502	29.48%	3,593	70.52%	0	0.00%
1956	1,606	33.24%	3,225	66.76%	0	0.00%
1960	1,484	28.95%	3,642	71.05%	0	0.00%
1964	3,753	60.51%	2,449	39.49%	0	0.00%
1968	963	13.45%	1,064	14.86%	5,135	71.70%
1972	6,217	85.93%	988	13.66%	30	0.41%
1976	2,927	35.35%	5,196	62.76%	156	1.88%
1980	4,694	50.28%	4,360	46.70%	282	3.02%
1984	7,126	74.01%	2,503	25.99%	0	0.00%
1988	7,490	69.30%	3,235	29.93%	83	0.77%
1992	5,726	42.25%	3,888	28.69%	3,940	29.07%
1996	7,709	49.68%	5,342	34.42%	2,467	15.90%
2000	12,186	66.51%	5,643	30.80%	494	2.70%
2004	17,555	73.22%	6,213	25.91%	208	0.87%
2008	19,561	72.08%	7,174	26.43%	404	1.49%
2012	21,490	75.19%	6,671	23.34%	421	1.47%
2016	25,756	75.98%	6,876	20.28%	1,266	3.73%
2020	32,947	75.23%	10,338	23.61%	510	1.16%
2024	38,970	78.25%	10,287	20.66%	545	1.09%

== Libraries ==
Walton County has four branches, including the historic DeFuniak Springs Library.

- Coastal Branch Library
- DeFuniak Springs Library
- Freeport
- Gladys N. Milton Memorial Library

== Schools ==
The county is served by the Walton County School District.

=== Elementary schools ===
- Bay School, Santa Rosa Beach
- Dune Lakes Elementary, Santa Rosa Beach
- Freeport Elementary, Freeport
- Maude Saunders Elementary School, DeFuniak Springs
- Mossy Head Elementary, Mossy Head
- Van R. Butler Elementary, Santa Rosa Beach
- West DeFuniak Elementary, DeFuniak Springs

=== Middle schools ===
- Emerald Coast Middle School, Santa Rosa Beach
- Freeport Middle School, Freeport
- Walton Middle School, DeFuniak Springs

=== High schools ===
- Freeport High School, Freeport
- South Walton High School, Santa Rosa Beach
- Walton High School, DeFuniak Springs

=== K–12 ===
- Paxton School, Paxton

=== Charter schools ===
- Walton Academy, DeFuniak Springs
- Seaside Neighborhood School, Seaside
- Seacoast Collegiate High School, Santa Rosa Beach

== Communities ==
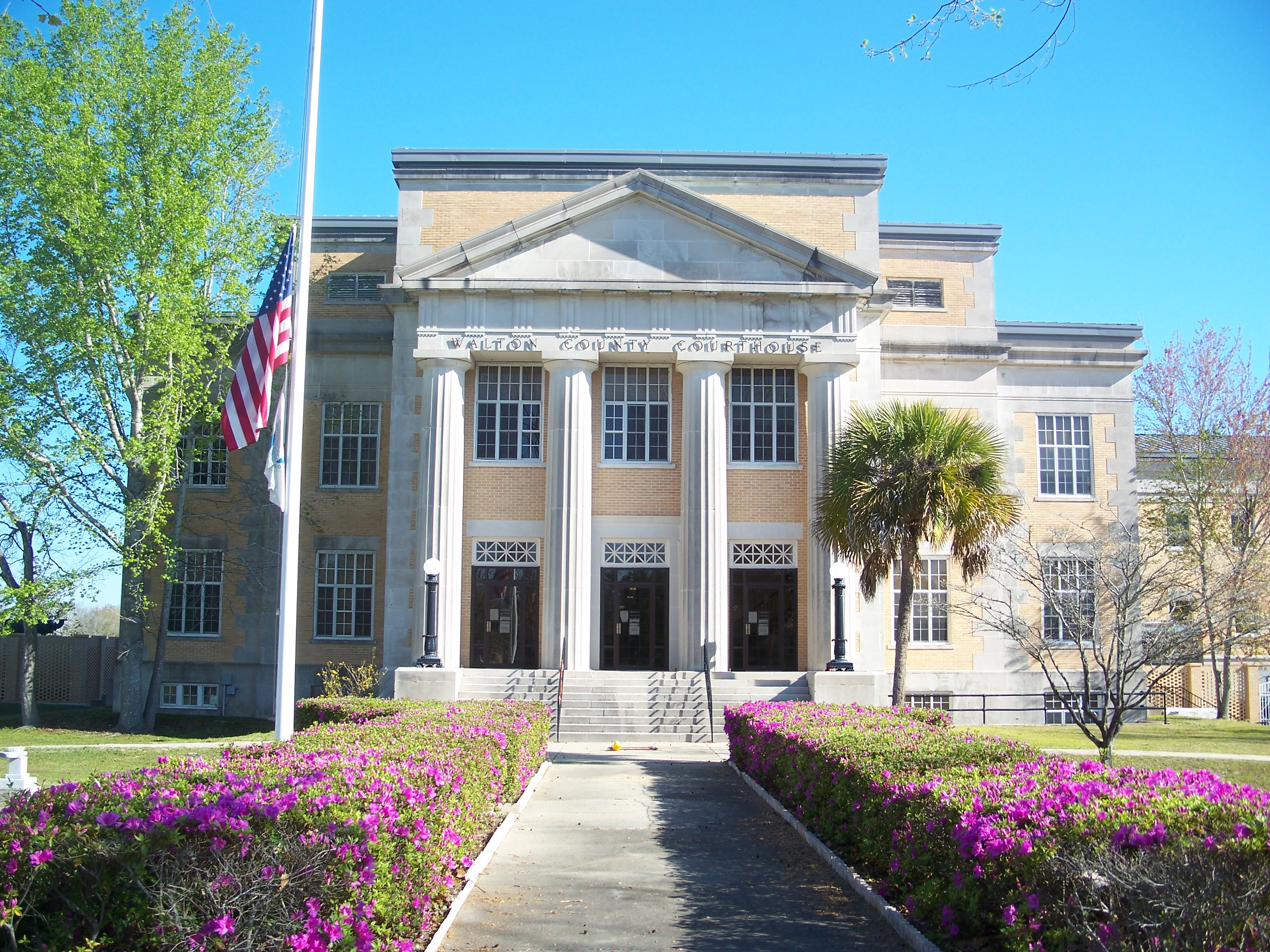
Walton County Courthouse, 2008

=== Cities ===
- DeFuniak Springs
- Freeport

=== Town ===
- Paxton

=== Census-designated place ===
- Miramar Beach

=== Other unincorporated communities ===
- Alys Beach
- Argyle
- Blue Mountain Beach
- Bruce
- Darlington
- Eucheanna (Euchee Valley)
- Glendale
- Grayton Beach
- Inlet Beach
- Liberty
- Mossy Head
- Red Bay
- Rosemary Beach
- Santa Rosa Beach
- Seacrest
- Seagrove Beach
- Seaside
- Villa Tasso
- WaterColor
- Rock Hill

== Gallery ==
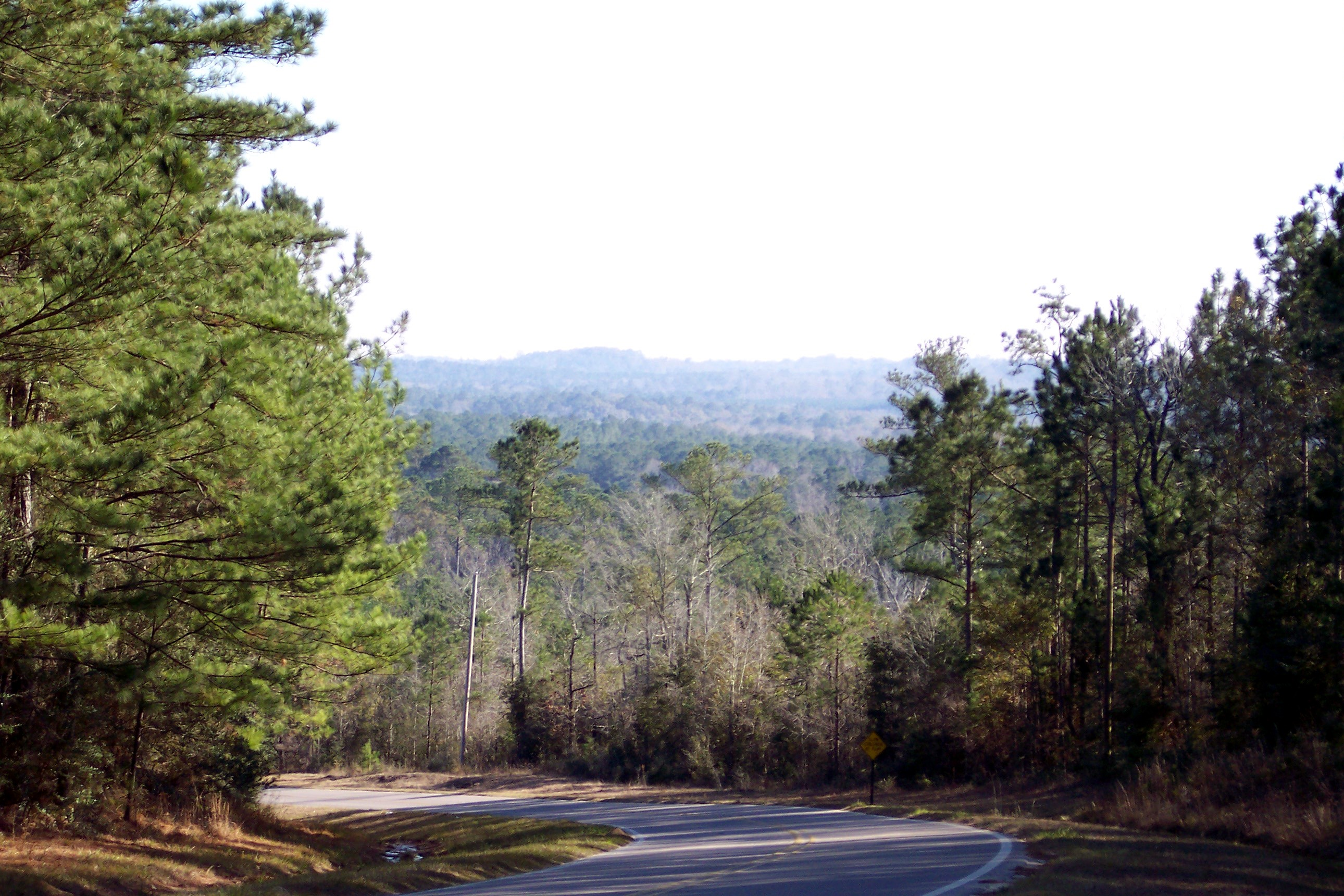
The hilly terrain of Walton County differs from most of the rest of Florida.

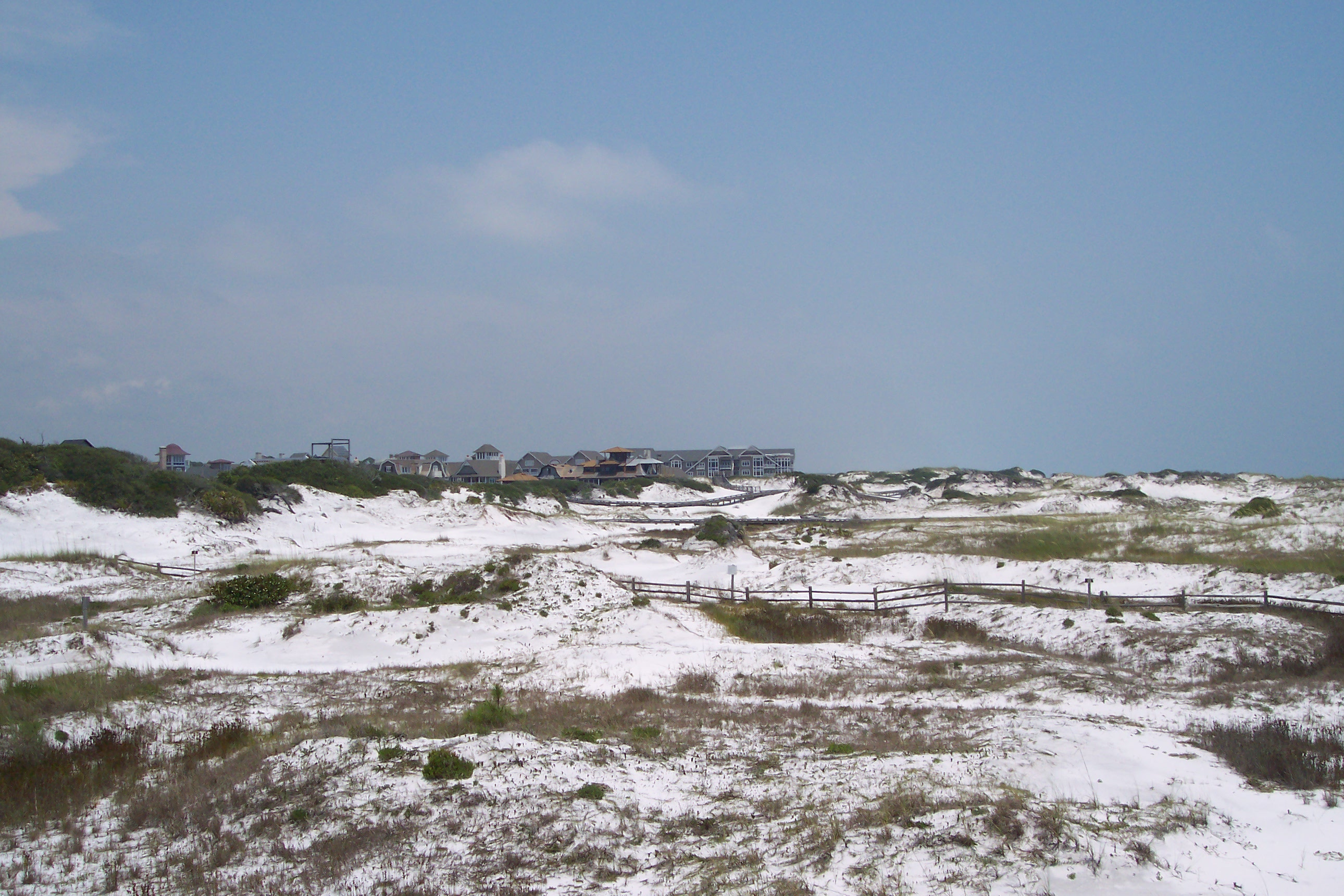
South Walton contains many neighborhoods nestled in sugary-white sand dunes.

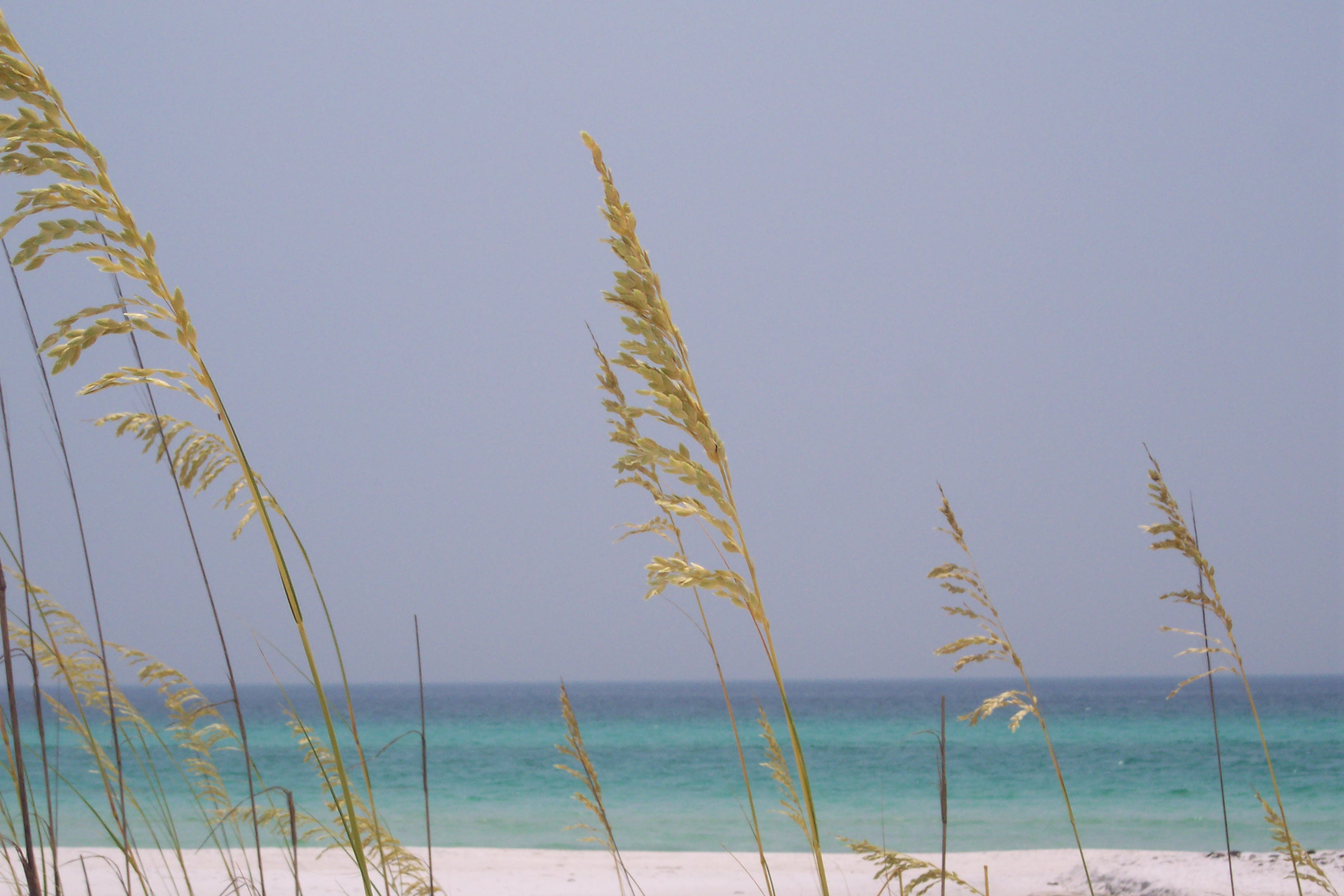
The coast of Walton County is fringed by emerald Gulf waters.

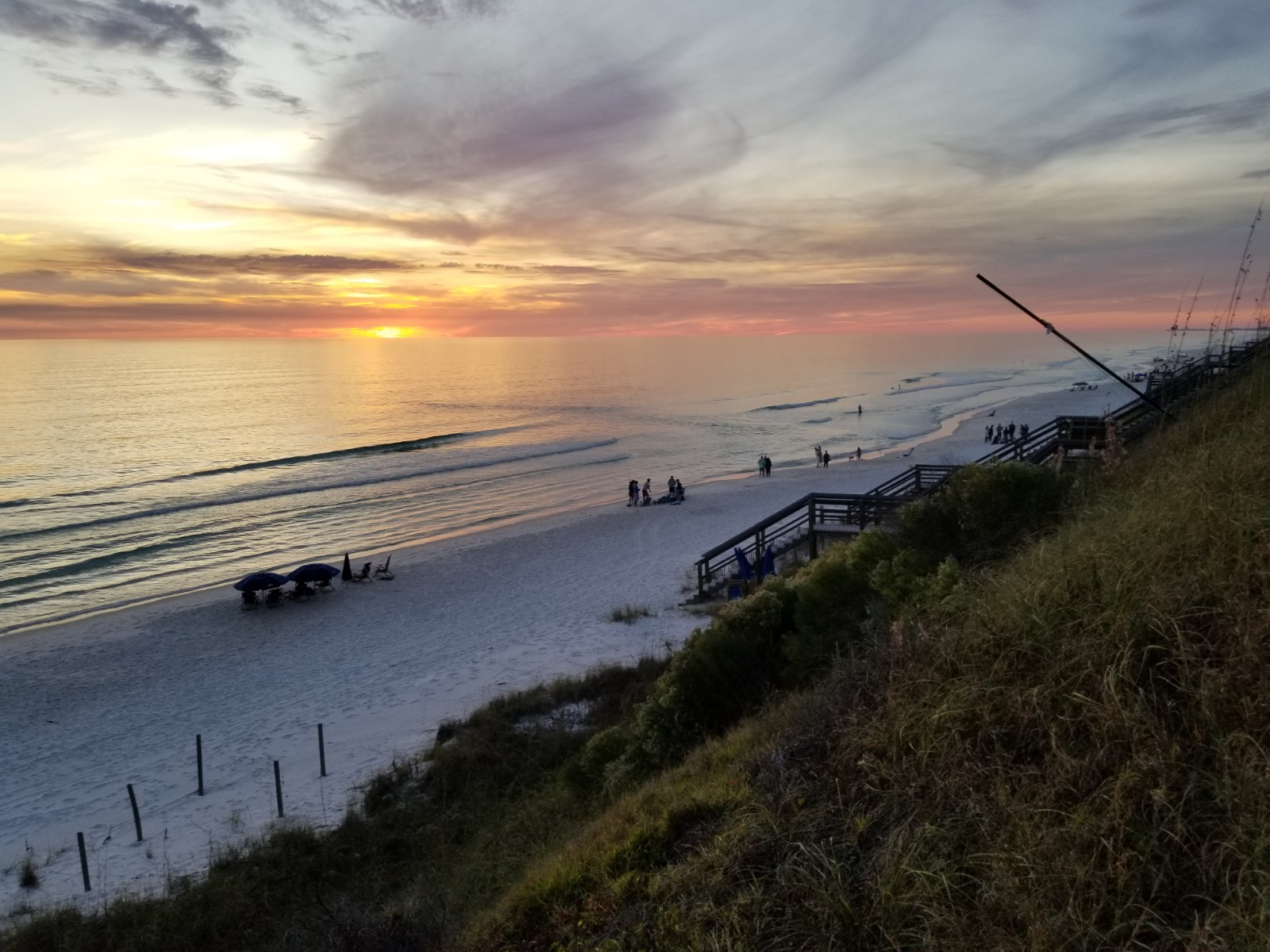
View of sunset on the beach off Florida State Road 30A, in Walton County

== Transportation ==
=== Airports ===
- DeFuniak Springs Airport

=== Highways ===
- I-10 (Interstate 10)
- US 90 (U.S. Highway 90)
- US 98 (U.S. Highway 98)
- US 331 (U.S. Highway 331)
- SR 20
- SR 30A
- SR 81
- SR 83

== Notable people ==
- Sean Dietrich, writer
- Buck Showalter, baseball manager

== See also ==
- National Register of Historic Places listings in Walton County, Florida
- Nokuse Plantation
