= Grayton Beach, Florida =

Village in Florida, U.S.

Coordinates: 30°20′N 86°10′W

Grayton Beach is a small, historic beach village on the Florida Panhandle Gulf coast halfway between Destin and Panama City in Walton County and adjacent to Grayton Beach State Park. Collectively, the area is known as the "Beaches of South Walton", with South Walton referring to the southern portion of Walton County below the Choctawhatchee Bay.

== Geography ==
The village is in the center of a 20-mile-long (32 km) stretch of coastal dune lakes. Western Lake is one of the nearby coastal dune lakes. Most land north of County Road 30A in the Grayton Beach community is state park.
