= Freeport High School =

Freeport High School may refer to:

- Freeport High School (Florida), Freeport, Florida, U.S.
- Freeport High School (Illinois), Freeport, Illinois, U.S.
- Freeport High School (Maine), Freeport, Maine, U.S.
- Freeport High School (New York), Freeport, New York, U.S.
- Freeport Area Senior High School, Freeport, Pennsylvania, U.S.

== See also ==
- Freeport Junior High School, Freeport, Pennsylvania, U.S.
