= Walton County School District =

Walton County School District may refer to:

- Walton County School District (Florida)
- Walton County School District (Georgia)
