= Don Gillis =

Don Gillis may refer to:

- Don Gillis (American football) (born 1935), center for the Chicago Cardinals of the NFL
- Don Gillis (composer) (1912–1978), American composer, conductor and teacher
- Don Gillis (sportscaster) (1922–2008), American radio and television personality
- Don Gillis, musical director for the television series Fraggle Rock
- Donald Stuart Gillis (1879–1967) lawyer and state senator whose tenure included a term as speaker of Florida Senate

== See also ==
- Donald Gillies (disambiguation)
