= South Walton High School =

- 645 Greenway Trail; Santa Rosa Beach, Florida; United States

Information
- Type: Public
- Motto: Sowal so Rowdy
- Established: 2002
- School district: Walton County School District
- NCES School ID: 120198003941
- Principal: Nina Borthwick
- Faculty: 34.03 (on FTE basis)
- Grades: 9 to 12
- Enrollment: 859 (2018-19)
- Student to teacher ratio: 18.7:1
- Colors: Green, Gray, Black, and White
- Mascot: Sammy Seahawk
- Nickname: Seahawks
- Website: swh.walton.k12.fl.us

South Walton High School is a public high school in Santa Rosa Beach, Walton County, Florida operated by the Walton County School District. It is located at 645 Greenway Trail. The school's teams compete as the Seahawks.

== See also ==
- Walton High School (DeFuniak Springs, Florida)
- Freeport High School (Freeport, Florida)
