= 1975 hurricane season =

1975 hurricane season may refer to:

- The 1975 Atlantic hurricane season
- The 1975 Pacific hurricane season
