= 1975 North Indian Ocean cyclone season =

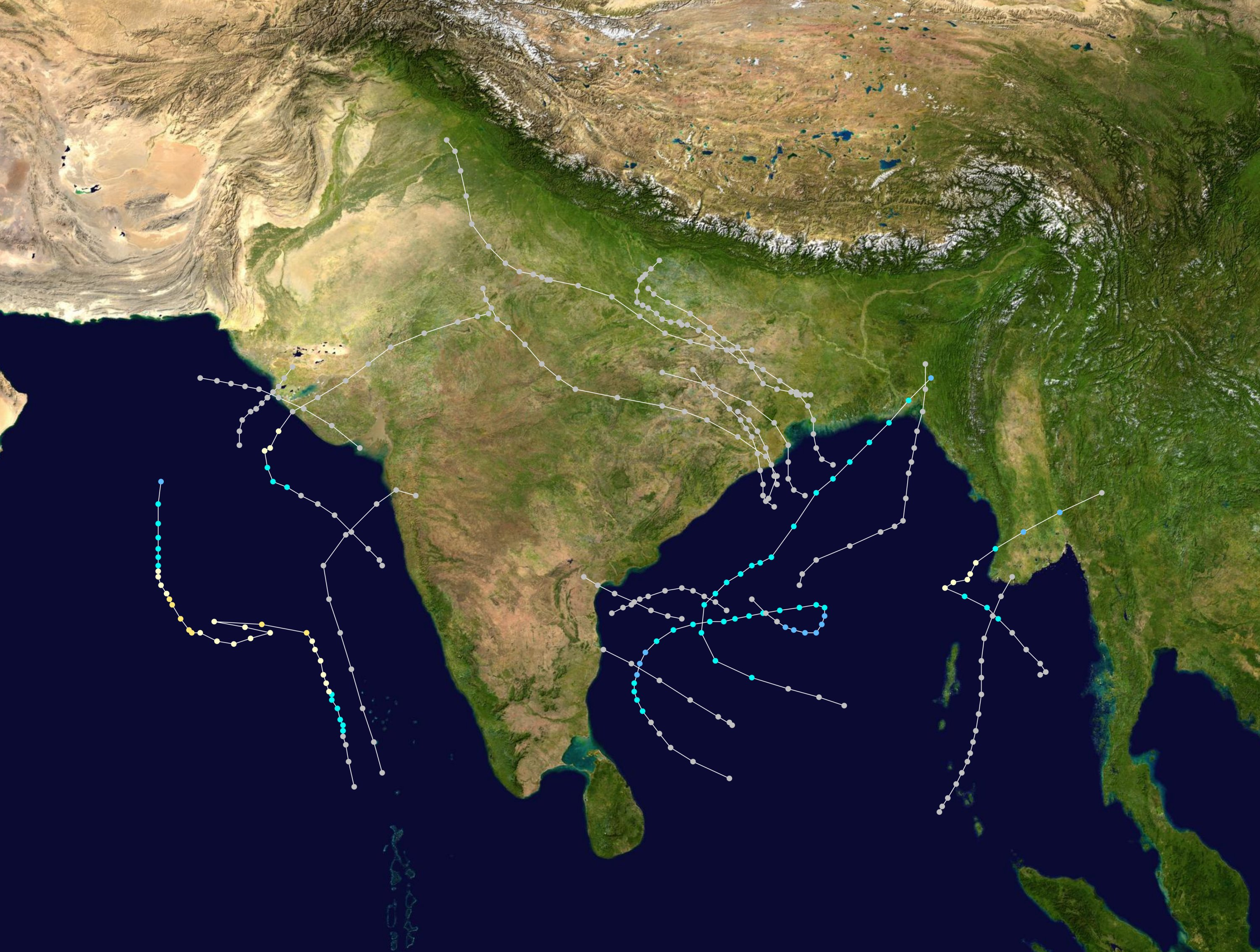
- Season summary map

Seasonal boundaries
- First system formed: January 6, 1975
- Last system dissipated: December 20, 1975

Seasonal statistics
- Depressions: 20
- Cyclonic storms: 7
- Severe cyclonic storms: 4
- Total fatalities: Unknown
- Total damage: Unknown

Related articles
- 1975 Atlantic hurricane season; 1975 Pacific hurricane season; 1975 Pacific typhoon season

The 1975 North Indian Ocean cyclone season was at the time, the most active cyclone season on record until it was beaten out 17 years later. The season has no official bounds but cyclones tend to form between April and December. These dates conventionally delimit the period of each year when most tropical cyclones form in the northern Indian Ocean. There are two main seas in the North Indian Ocean—the Bay of Bengal to the east of the Indian subcontinent and the Arabian Sea to the west of India. The official Regional Specialized Meteorological Centre in this basin is the India Meteorological Department (IMD), while the Joint Typhoon Warning Center (JTWC) releases unofficial advisories. An average of five tropical cyclones form in the North Indian Ocean every season with peaks in May and November. Cyclones occurring between the meridians 45°E and 100°E are included in the season by the IMD.

== Systems ==
1

=== Tropical Storm One (01B) ===
- Depression (IMD)
- Tropical storm (SSHWS)
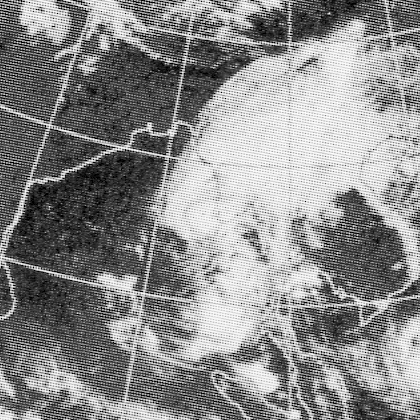
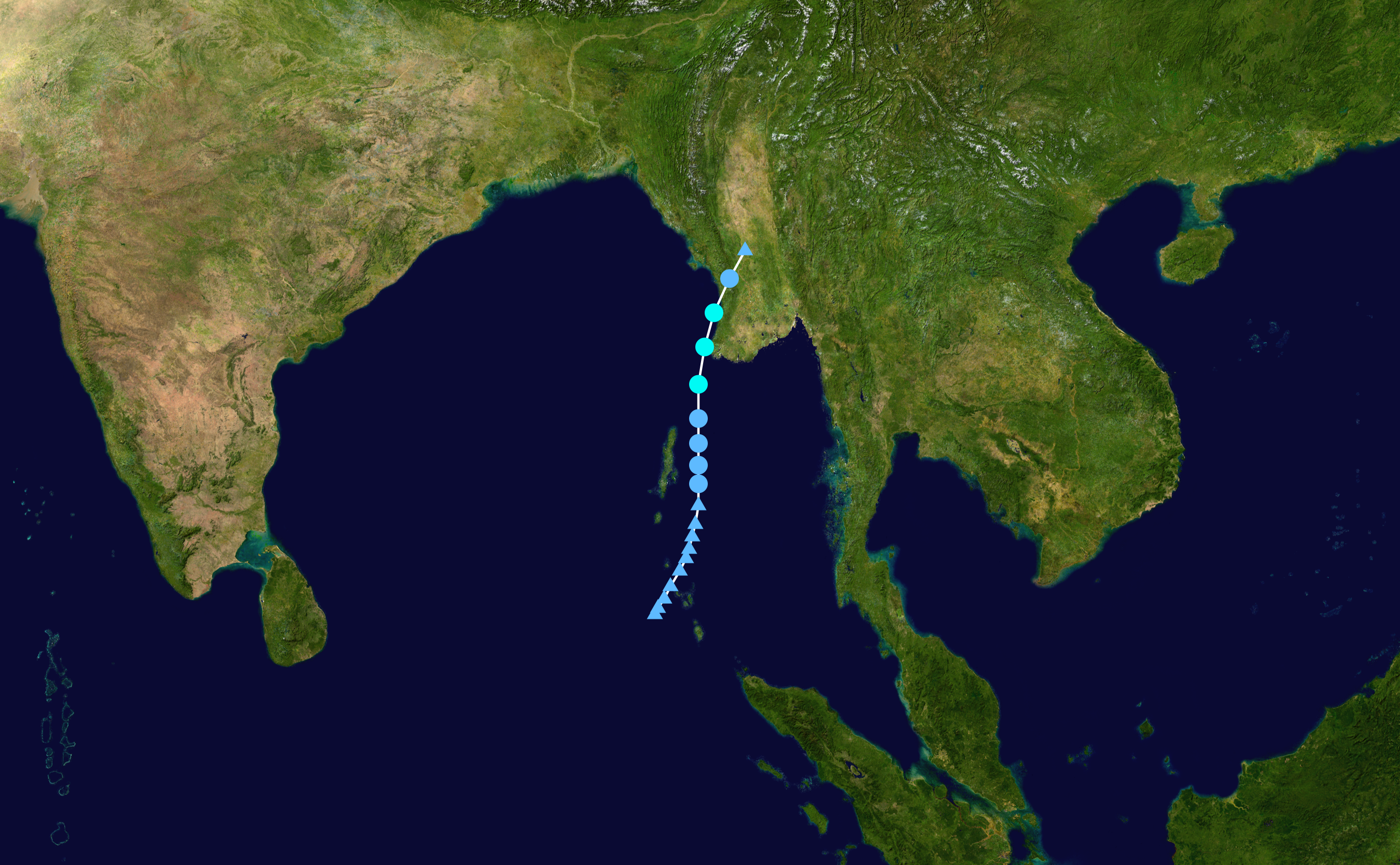
- Duration: January 6 – January 10
- Peak intensity: 45 km/h (30 mph) (3-min);

=== Cyclone Two (02A) ===
- Extremely severe cyclonic storm (IMD)
- Category 2 tropical cyclone (SSHWS)
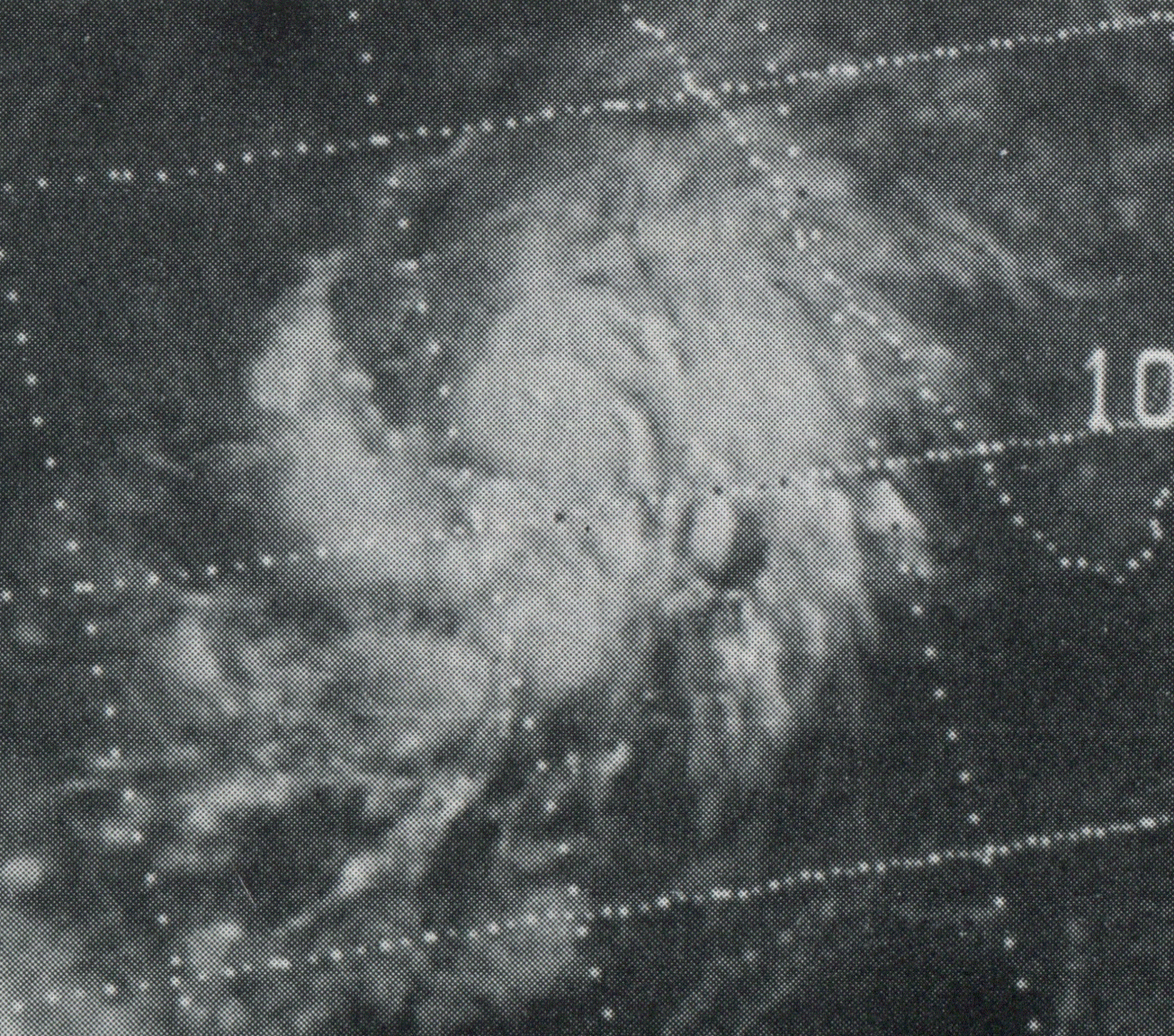
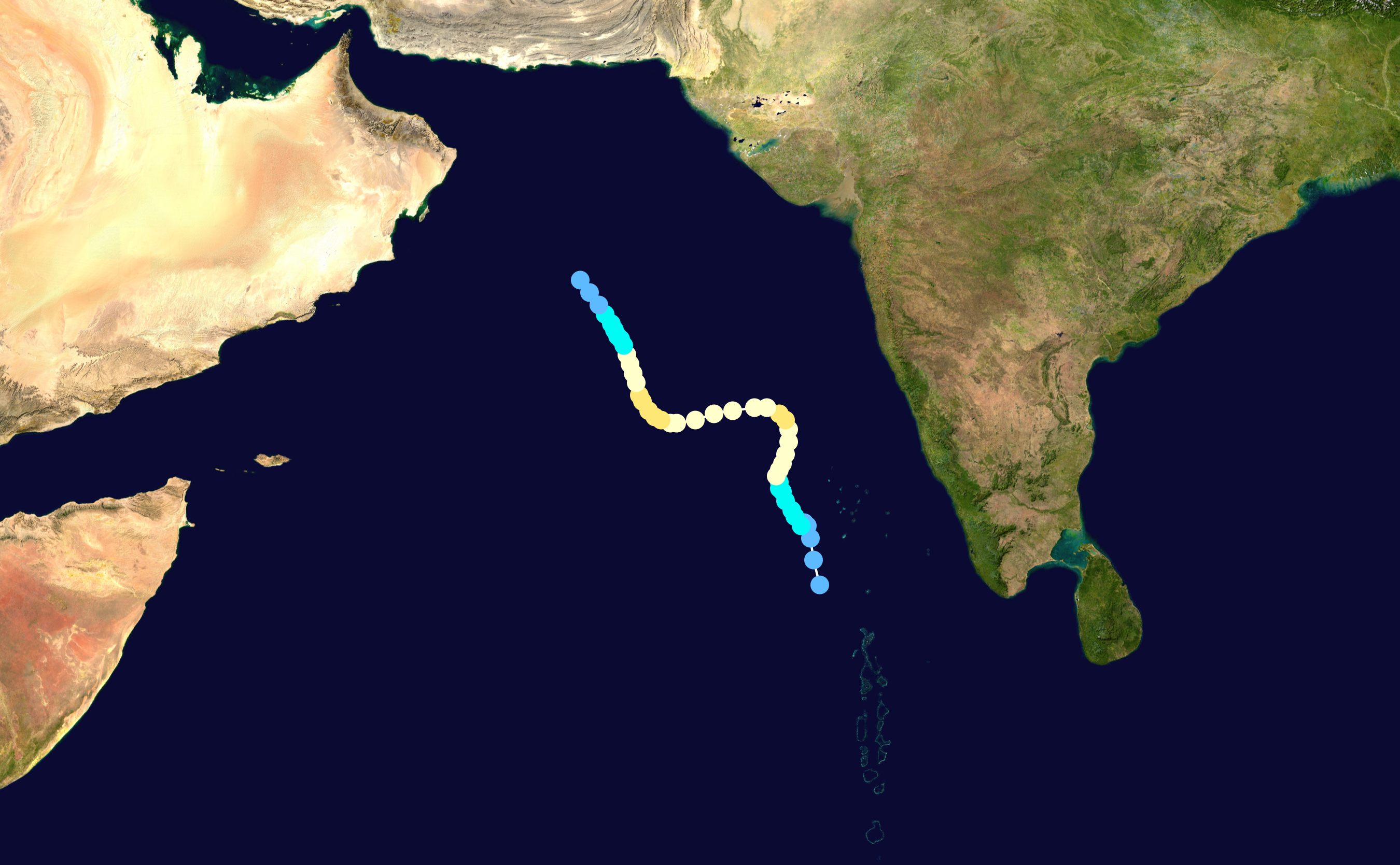
- Duration: May 1 – May 10
- Peak intensity: 185 km/h (115 mph) (3-min);

Two meandered slowly northwest, attaining hurricane-force winds between May 3 and May 5. The cyclone dissipated before making landfall.

=== Cyclone Three (03B) ===
- Very severe cyclonic storm (IMD)
- Category 1 tropical cyclone (SSHWS)
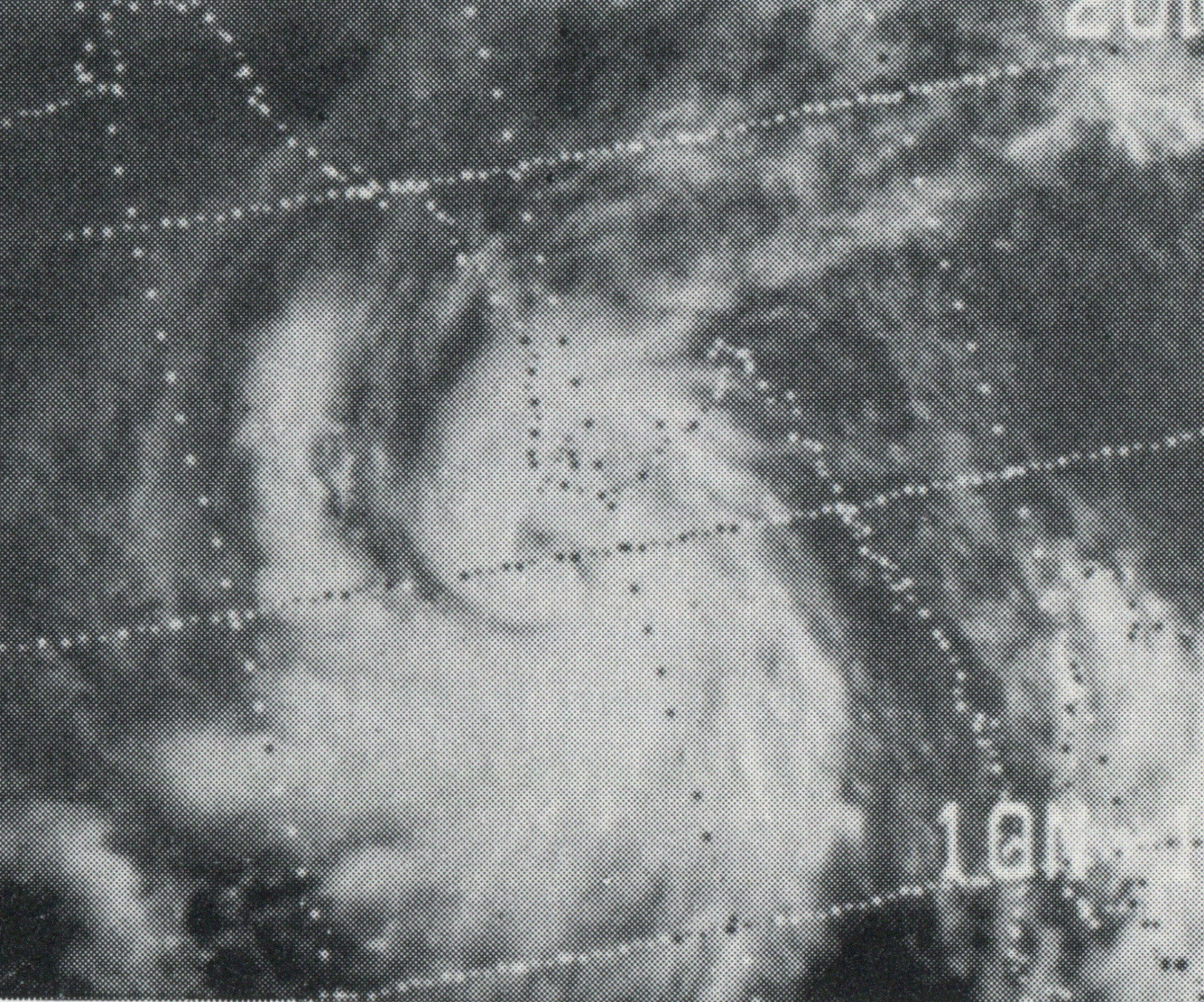
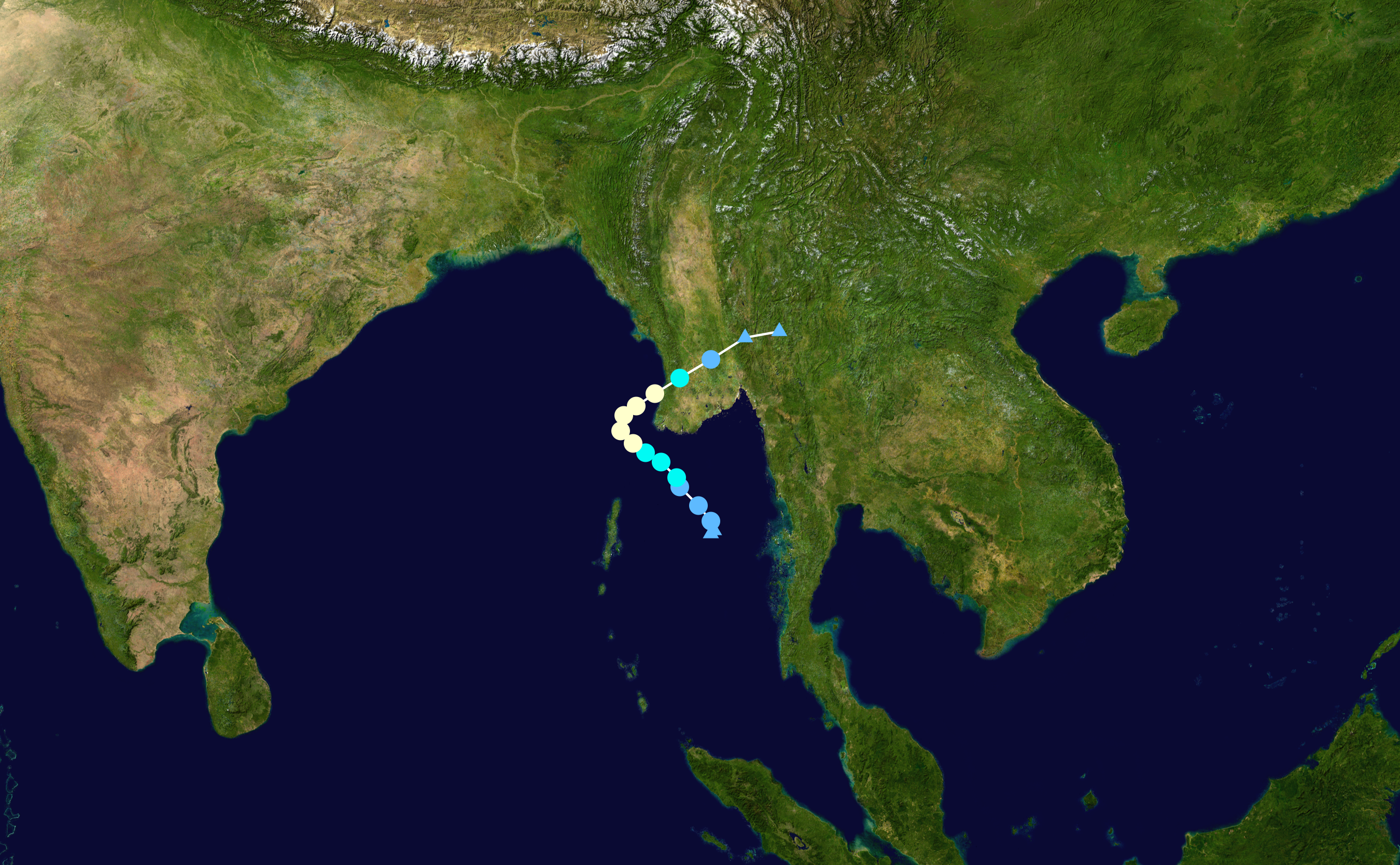
- Duration: May 4 – May 8
- Peak intensity: 150 km/h (90 mph) (3-min);

On May 5, Cyclone Three formed offshore of Thailand before recurving into Burma on May 7 as a hurricane-force system. Three moved inland and dissipated on May 8.

=== Tropical Storm Five (05B) ===
- Deep depression (IMD)
- Tropical storm (SSHWS)
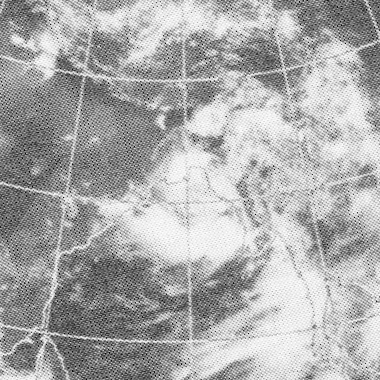
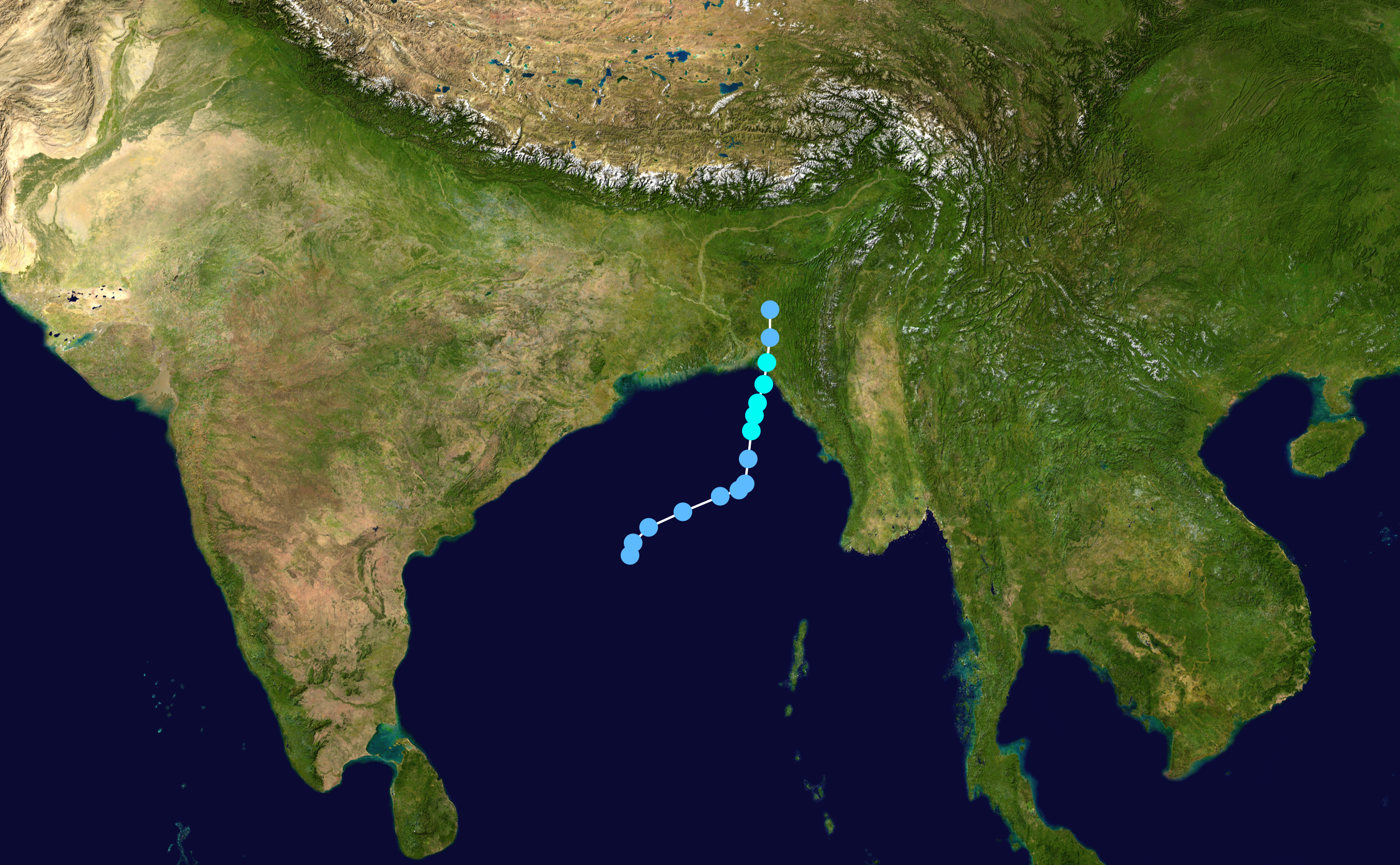
- Duration: June 4 – June 7
- Peak intensity: 55 km/h (35 mph) (3-min);

=== Cyclone Sixteen (16A) ===
- Very severe cyclonic storm (IMD)
- Category 1 tropical cyclone (SSHWS)
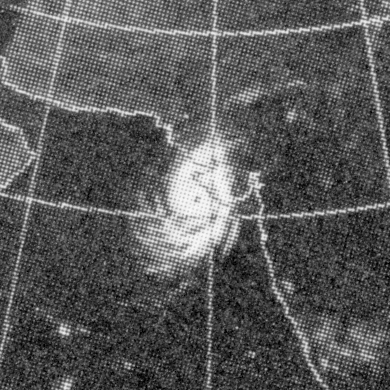
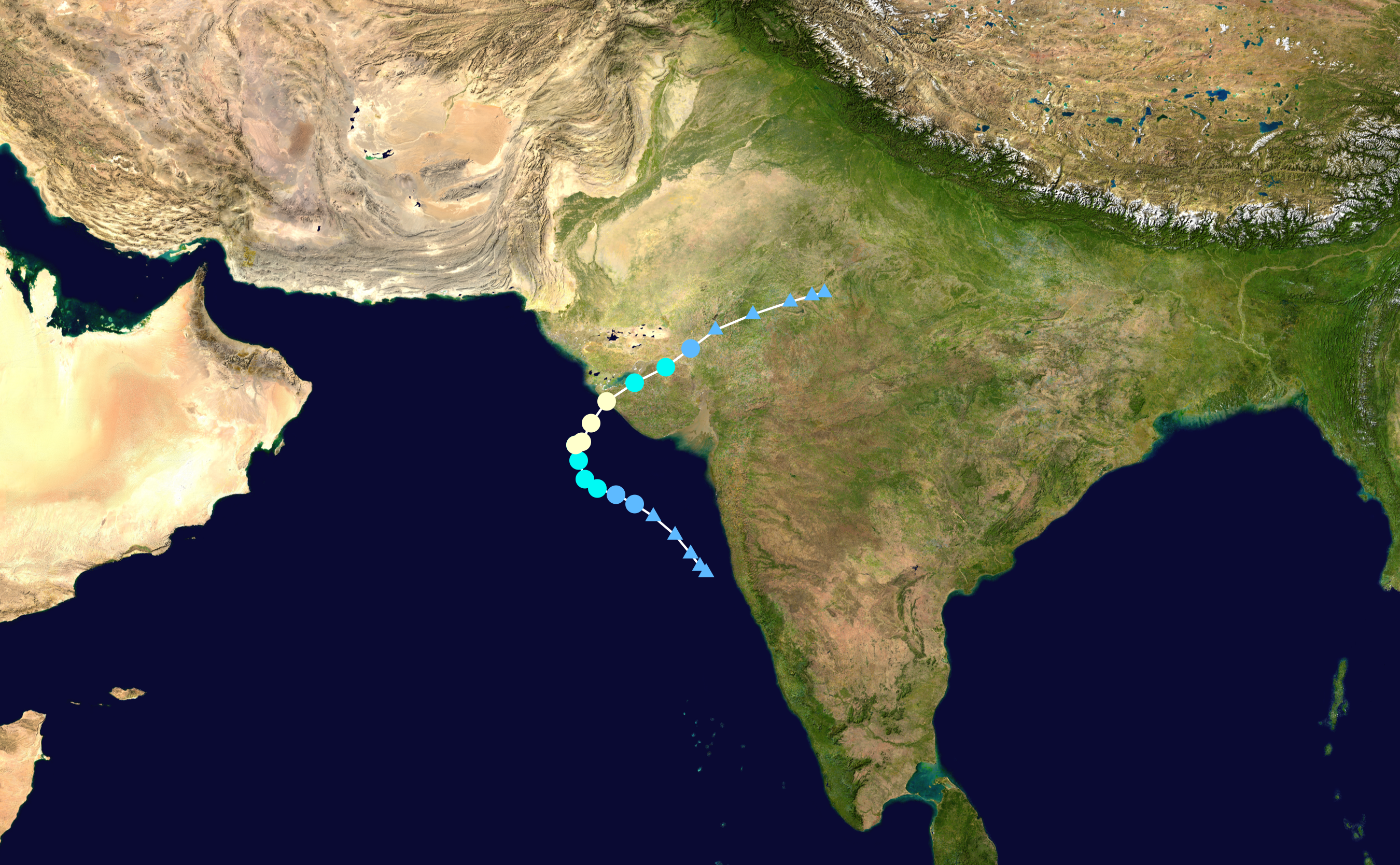
- Duration: October 19 – October 24
- Peak intensity: 155 km/h (100 mph) (3-min);

Cyclone Sixteen formed on 19 October and began to intensify, peaking as a Very Severe Cyclonic Storm or as a Category-1 equivalent storm on October 21. The storm made landfall at Porbandar in Gujarat at peak intensity on 22 October. Sixteen dissipated on October 24.

The cyclone caused severe damage to livelihoods, killing 85 people. Total damages were estimated to be ₹75 crore (equivalent to ₹21 billion or US$220 million in 2023).

=== Tropical Storm Eighteen (18B) ===
- Cyclonic storm (IMD)
- Tropical storm (SSHWS)
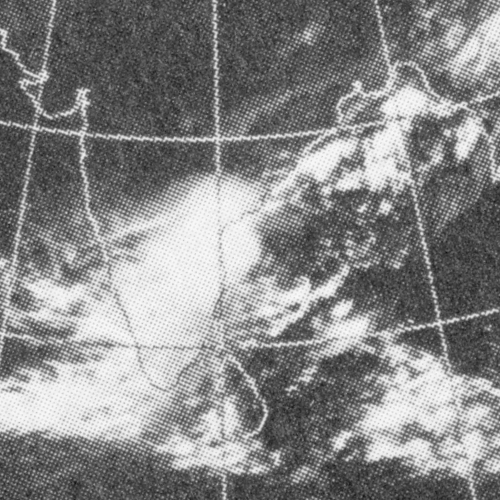
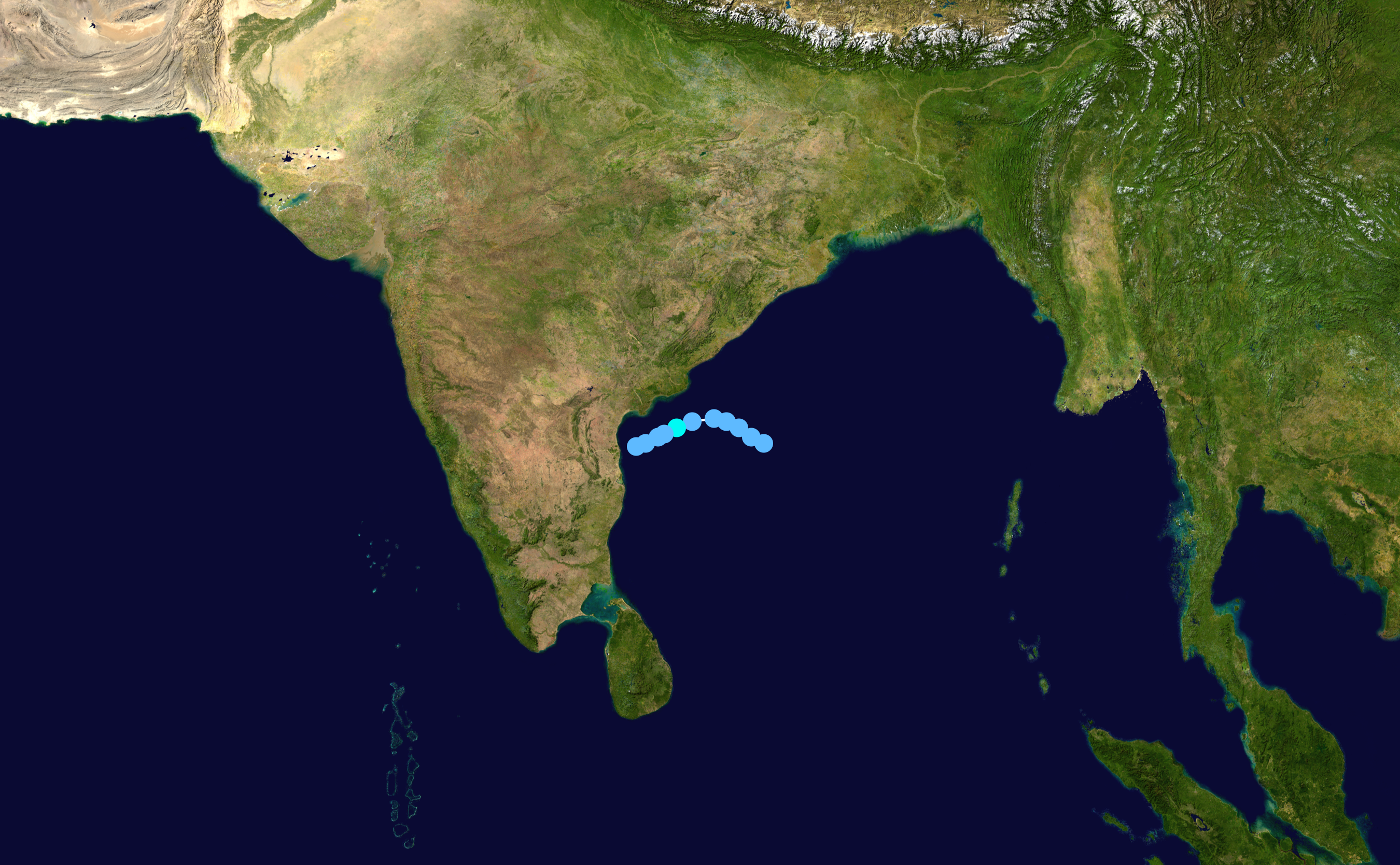
- Duration: November 1 – November 3
- Peak intensity: 65 km/h (40 mph) (3-min);

=== Tropical Storm Nineteen (19B) ===
- Severe cyclonic storm (IMD)
- Tropical storm (SSHWS)
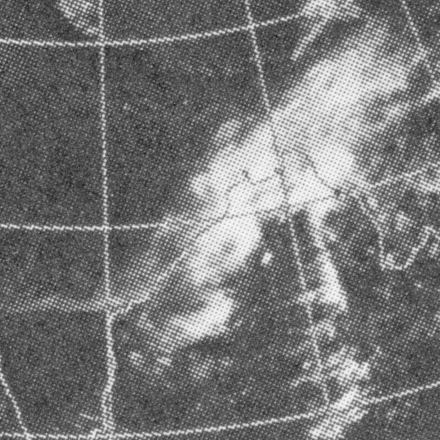
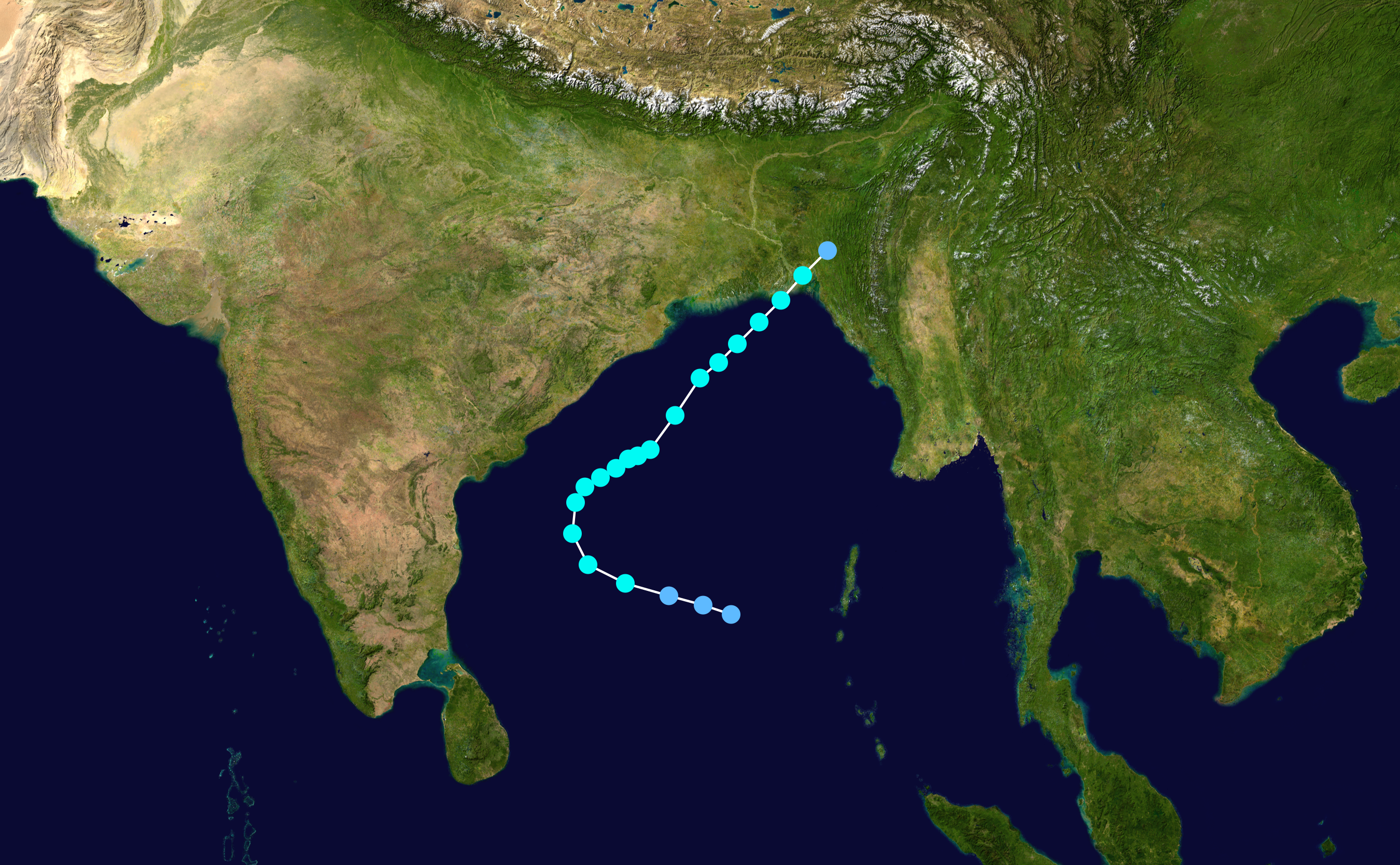
- Duration: November 7 – November 12
- Peak intensity: 100 km/h (65 mph) (3-min);

=== Tropical Storm Twenty (20B) ===
- Cyclonic storm (IMD)
- Tropical storm (SSHWS)
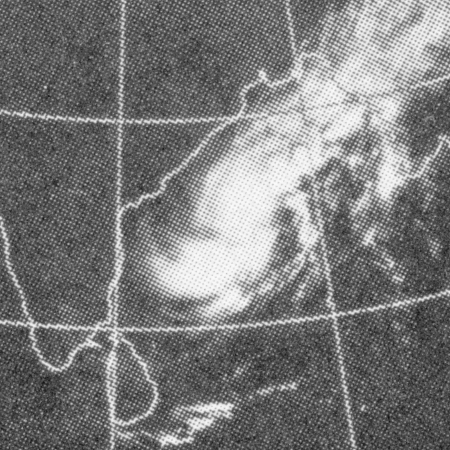
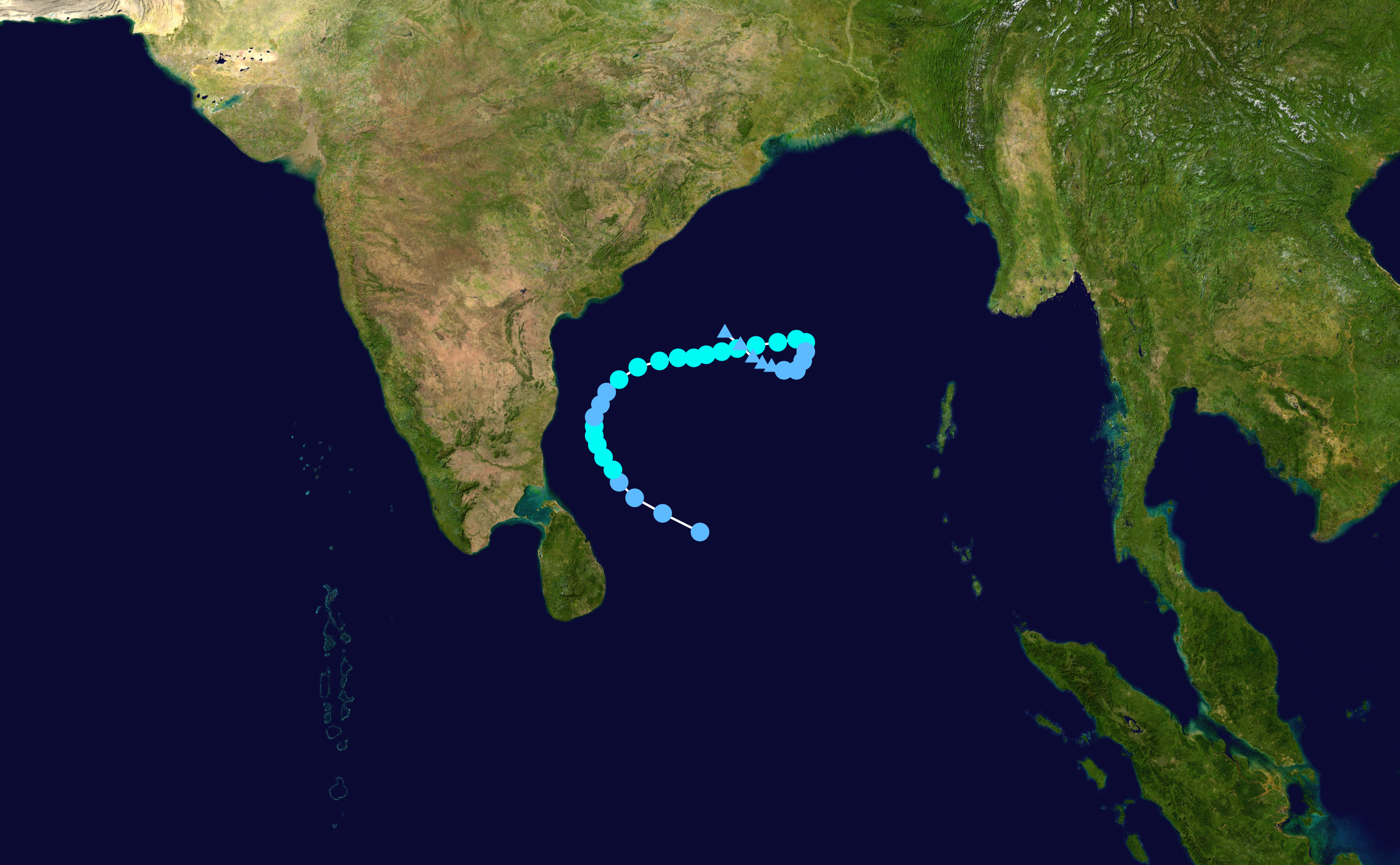
- Duration: November 24 – December 2
- Peak intensity: 75 km/h (45 mph) (3-min);

== See also ==
- North Indian Ocean tropical cyclone
- 1975 Atlantic hurricane season
- 1975 Pacific hurricane season
- 1975 Pacific typhoon season
- Australian cyclone seasons: 1974–75, 1975–76
- South Pacific cyclone seasons: 1974–75, 1975–76
- South-West Indian Ocean cyclone seasons: 1974–75, 1975–76
