= Donald Gillies =

Donald Gillies may refer to:

- Donald B. Gillies (1928–1975), mathematician and computer scientist
- Donald A. Gillies (born 1944), historian of mathematics
- Donnie Gillies (born 1951), Scottish footballer

== See also ==
- Donald Gillis (disambiguation)
