= Walton High School (DeFuniak Springs, Florida) =

Location
- 449 Walton Road; DeFuniak Springs, Florida; United States; 30°44′31″N 86°07′33″W

Information
- Type: Public
- Motto: Build Your Legacy
- School district: Walton County School District
- NCES School ID: 120198002025
- Principal: Brianna Leavins
- Teaching staff: 48.49 (on FTE basis)
- Grades: 9 to 12
- Enrollment: 898 (2023-2024)
- Student to teacher ratio: 18.52
- Colors: Navy Blue, Silver and White
- Athletics conference: FHSAA Class 5A-1
- Mascot: Braves
- Nickname: Braves
- Website: whs.walton.k12.fl.us

Walton High School is a public high school in DeFuniak Springs, Walton County, Florida operated by the Walton County School District.

In the late 2000s, the Walton County school district approved funding for a new building. The new building opened its doors for the 2010–2011 school year.

The school's athletic teams universally use the Braves mascot.

== State championships ==
- 1985 – Football (defeated Wildwood 7–2)

== Alumni ==
- Kyrsten Sinema – US senator from Arizona
- Ed Robinson - NFL Linebacker
- Dexter McNabb - NFL Running back

== See also ==
- South Walton High School
