= Freeport, Florida =

- City
- City of Freeport
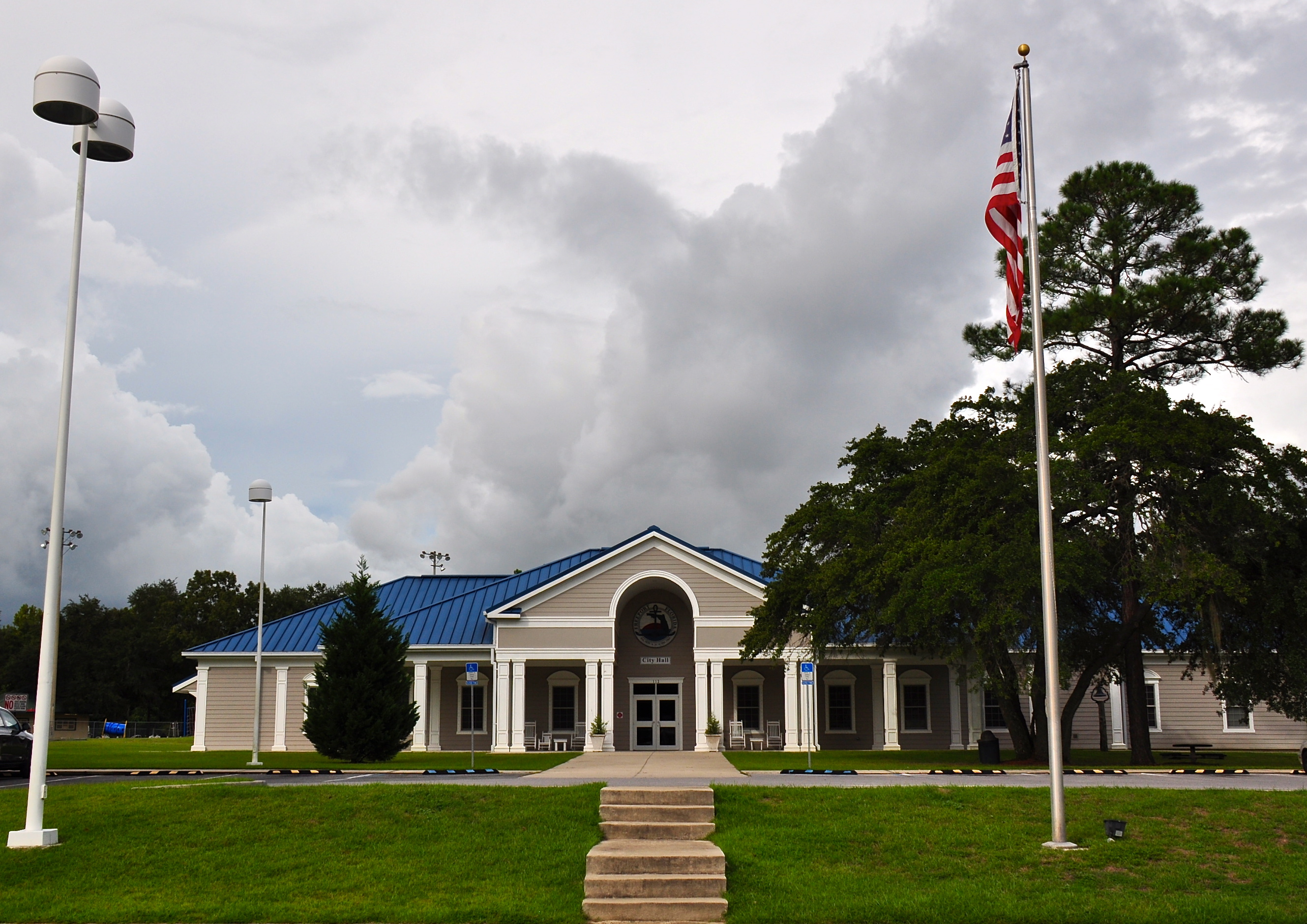
- Freeport City Hall, September 2014.

- Seal

- Location in Walton County and the state of Florida
- Coordinates: 30°30′14″N 86°08′15″W
- Country: United States
- State: Florida
- County: Walton
- Settled: 1830
- Incorporated: 1963

Government
  - Type: Mayor-Council
  - Mayor: Russell "Russ" Barley

Area
  - Total: 19.00 sq mi (49.21 km^{2})
  - Land: 18.94 sq mi (49.06 km^{2})
  - Water: 0.058 sq mi (0.15 km^{2})
- Elevation: 26 ft (7.9 m)

Population (2020)
  - Total: 5,861
  - Density: 309.4/sq mi (119.46/km^{2})
- Time zone: UTC-6 (Central (CST))
  - Summer (DST): UTC-5 (CDT)
- ZIP code: 32439
- Area codes: 850, 448
- FIPS code: 12-24825
- GNIS feature ID: 2403663
- Website: www.freeportflorida.gov

Freeport is a city in Walton County, Florida, United States. It is part of the Crestview–Fort Walton Beach–Destin, Florida Metropolitan Statistical Area. As of the 2020 census, Freeport had a population of 5,861, up from 1,787 at the 2010 census. Freeport is one of the fastest growing cities in Florida. After the construction of the massive group of neighborhoods, Hammock Bay, the population grew by about two thousand.

== History ==
Freeport is said to have been established circa 1830. It was called Freeport due to an absence of fees to use the dock ('free port') at the junction of Four Mile Creek and Lafayette Creek.

Historically, the economy of Freeport was largely dependent on the local timber industry through sawmills and logging, as well as the processing of turpentine.

After the introduction of the railroad in Defuniak Springs, Freeport lost its position as the economic powerhouse in Walton County. Today it has a sizeable population of people who serve at Eglin AFB.

== Geography ==
Freeport is located along U.S. Route 331 and Florida State Road 20. U.S. 331 runs from north to south to the east of the city, leading north 17 mi (27 km) to DeFuniak Springs, the Walton County seat, and south 11 mi (18 km) to U.S. Route 98 near Santa Rosa Beach. FL-20 runs from west to east through the main part of the city, leading east 17 mi (27 km) to Ebro and west 24 mi (39 km) to Niceville.

According to the United States Census Bureau, the city has a total area of 28.0 km^{2} (10.8 sq mi), of which 10.8 square miles (28 km^{2}) is land and 0.04 square miles (0.10 km^{2}) (0.28%) is water.

Freeport is situated at the junction of Four Mile Creek and Lafayette Creek, which empty out into LaGrange Bayou, which is connected to the Choctawhatchee Bay.

== Demographics ==
Historical population
Census	Pop.	Note	%±
1970	518		—
1980	669		29.2%
1990	843		26.0%
2000	1,190		41.2%
2010	1,787		50.2%
2020	5,861		228.0%
2022 (est.)	6,542	▲	11.6%
U.S. Decennial Census

=== Racial and ethnic composition ===
Freeport racial composition (Hispanics excluded from racial categories) (NH = Non-Hispanic)
Race	Pop 2010	Pop 2020	% 2010	% 2020
White (NH)	1,469	4,695	82.20%	80.11%
Black or African American (NH)	52	156	2.91%	2.66%
Native American or Alaska Native (NH)	30	43	1.68%	0.73%
Asian (NH)	30	75	1.68%	1.28%
Pacific Islander or Native Hawaiian (NH)	1	4	0.06%	0.07%
Some other race (NH)	1	23	0.06%	0.39%
Two or more races/Multiracial (NH)	42	272	2.35%	4.64%
Hispanic or Latino (any race)	162	593	9.07%	10.12%
Total	1,787	5,861		

=== 2020 census ===
As of the 2020 census, Freeport had a population of 5,861. The median age was 38.1 years. 24.8% of residents were under the age of 18 and 15.9% of residents were 65 years of age or older. For every 100 females there were 94.1 males, and for every 100 females age 18 and over there were 91.5 males age 18 and over.

0.0% of residents lived in urban areas, while 100.0% lived in rural areas.

There were 2,200 households in Freeport, of which 36.0% had children under the age of 18 living in them. Of all households, 61.6% were married-couple households, 11.3% were households with a male householder and no spouse or partner present, and 20.4% were households with a female householder and no spouse or partner present. About 17.7% of all households were made up of individuals, and 8.1% had someone living alone who was 65 years of age or older.

There were 2,401 housing units, of which 8.4% were vacant. The homeowner vacancy rate was 3.5% and the rental vacancy rate was 11.0%.

=== Demographic estimates ===
According to the Census Bureau's 2020 ACS estimates, there were 760 families residing in the city.

=== 2010 census ===
As of the 2010 United States census, there were 1,787 people, 636 households, and 343 families residing in the city.

In 2010, the population density was 110.4 inhabitants per square mile (42.6/km^{2}). There were 563 housing units at an average density of 52.2/sq mi (20.2/km^{2}).

=== 2000 census ===
As of the census of 2000, there were 1,190 people, 500 households, and 327 families living in the city. The population density was 110.4 inhabitants per square mile (42.6/km^{2}). There were 563 housing units at an average density of 52.2/sq mi (20.2/km^{2}). The racial makeup of the city was 92.77% White, 2.35% African American, 2.18% Native American, 0.08% Asian, 0.17% Pacific Islander, 0.17% from other races, and 2.27% from two or more races. Hispanic or Latino of any race were 1.09% of the population.

In 2000, there were 500 households, out of which 31.6% had children under the age of 18 living with them, 49.4% were married couples living together, 11.8% had a female householder with no husband present, and 34.6% were non-families. 28.8% of all households were made up of individuals, and 12.0% had someone living alone who was 65 years of age or older. The average household size was 2.38 and the average family size was 2.90.

In 2000, in the city, the population was spread out, with 26.0% under the age of 18, 8.7% from 18 to 24, 27.5% from 25 to 44, 23.9% from 45 to 64, and 13.9% who were 65 years of age or older. The median age was 38 years. For every 100 females, there were 99.3 males. For every 100 females age 18 and over, there were 98.4 males.

In 2000, the median income for a household in the city was $25,735, and the median income for a family was $33,214. Males had a median income of $31,375 versus $19,219 for females. The per capita income for the city was $14,114. About 18.0% of families and 21.4% of the population were below the poverty line, including 26.0% of those under age 18 and 23.2% of those age 65 or over.

== Schools ==
Walton County School District:

- Freeport Elementary School
- Freeport Middle School
- Freeport High School

== Notable residents ==
- Donald Stuart Gillis (1879 - 1967), born in Freeport and served in the Florida Senate including as President of the Florida Senate
