= Ed Robinson =

American football player (born 1970)

Profile
- Position: Linebacker

Personal information
- Born: December 7, 1970 (age 55); DeFuniak Springs, Florida
- Listed height: 6 ft 0 in (1.83 m)
- Listed weight: 228 lb (103 kg)

Career information
- High school: Walton (DeFuniak Springs)
- College: Florida
- NFL draft: 1994: undrafted

Career history
- Pittsburgh Steelers (1994)

Career NFL statistics
- Tackles: 8
- Fumble recoveries: 1
- Stats at Pro Football Reference

Edward Robinson III (born December 7, 1970) is an American former professional football player who was a linebacker for one season with the Pittsburgh Steelers of the National Football League (NFL). He played college football for the Florida Gators.

== Early life and college career ==
Ed Robinson was born on December 7, 1970, in DeFuniak Springs, Florida. He played high school football at Walton High School in DeFuniak Springs. He then played in college at the University of Florida, where he was a team captain.

== Professional career ==
Robinson went undrafted in the 1994 NFL draft. He spent one year in the NFL with the Pittsburgh Steelers, recording 8 solo tackles and one assisted tackle.
