= D. Stuart Gillis =

American lawyer and senator (1879–1967)

Donald Stuart Gillis (November 5, 1879 – March 26, 1967) was an American lawyer, who served as a state senator and was elected as President of the Florida Senate in 1937.

== Early life ==
He was born on November 5, 1879 in Freeport, Florida, the youngest child of Dr. Angus McIntosh Gillis (1843-1893) and Nancy (Nanie) née McSween (1859-1944).

== Occupation ==
In 1927 he was the attorney for Walton County. He served as a Circuit Judge of the First Judicial Circuit of Florida. He was also elected the Mayor of DeFuniak Springs from 1912 - 1914 and from 1915 - 1916. He was elected to the Florida House of Representatives and subsequently to the Florida Senate representing District 3. Gillis presided over the Florida Senate as Senate President during the 1937 legislative session.

== Marriage and death ==
He was married to Bernice Bowyers Morrison (1882-1962), and they had at least two daughters. He died on March 26, 1967, at the age of 87, and is buried at the Magnolia cemetery in DeFuniak Springs.

== Legacy ==
His hone in DeFuniak Springs is at 16 East Circle Srive.
