= 1975 Atlantic hurricane season =

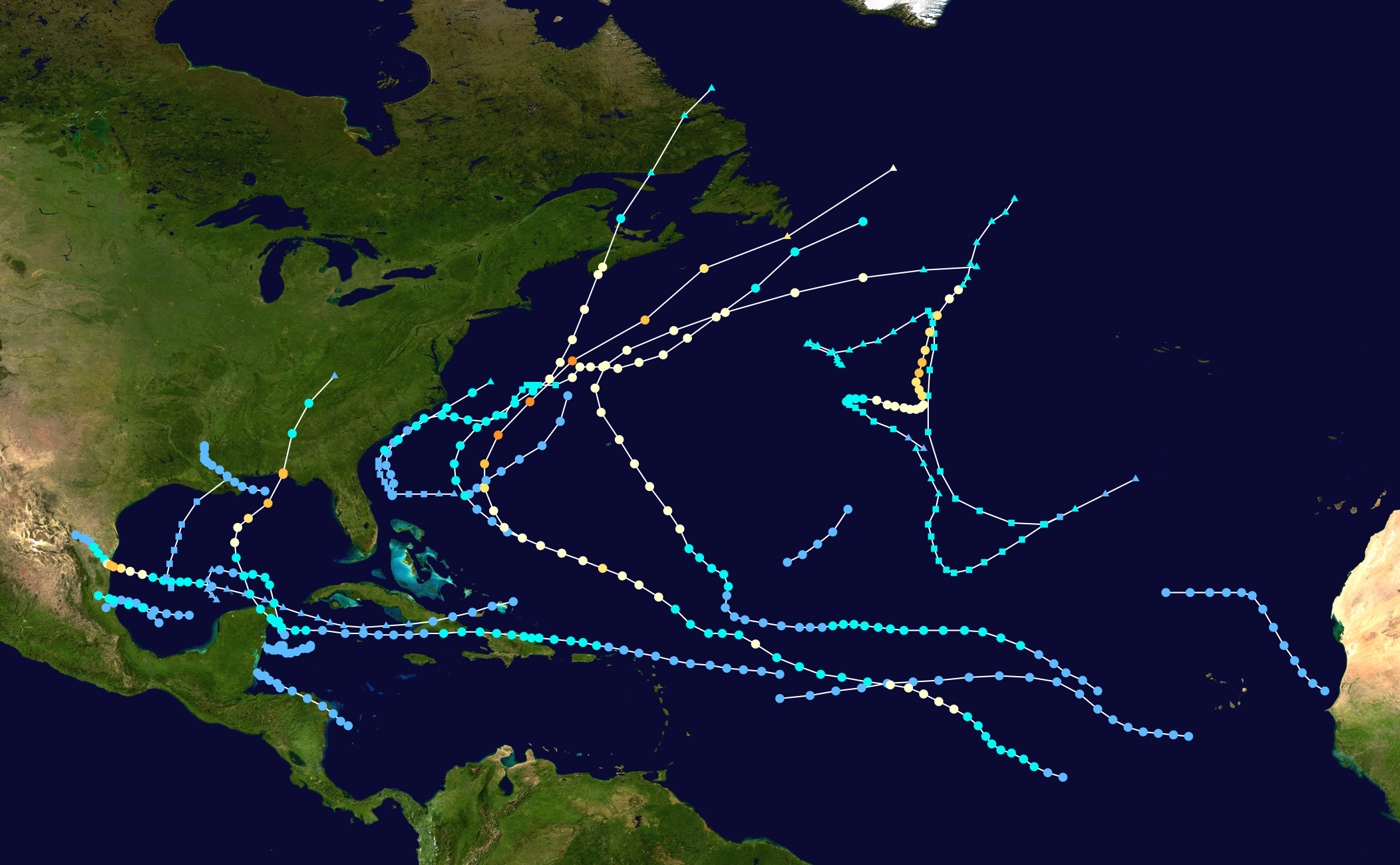
- Season summary map

Seasonal boundaries
- First system formed: January 4, 1975
- Last system dissipated: December 12, 1975

Strongest storm
- Name: Gladys
  - Maximum winds: 150 mph (240 km/h) (1-minute sustained)
  - Lowest pressure: 939 mbar (hPa; 27.73 inHg)

Seasonal statistics
- Total depressions: 23
- Total storms: 12
- Hurricanes: 7
- Major hurricanes (Cat. 3+): 4
- Total fatalities: 87 total
- Total damage: $564.7 million (1975 USD)

Related articles
- 1975 Pacific hurricane season; 1975 Pacific typhoon season; 1975 North Indian Ocean cyclone season

The 1975 Atlantic hurricane season was unusual due to featuring activity as early as January and as late as December. It also featured the first tropical storm to be upgraded to hurricane status using only satellite imagery, as well at the first major hurricane that formed from a subtropical storm. In terms of activity, the 1975 season was near average, with twelve nameable storms forming, of which seven became hurricanes. Four of those seven became major hurricanes, which are Category 3 intensity or higher on the Saffir–Simpson scale. The season officially began on June 1 and lasted until November 30. These dates conventionally delimit the period of each year when most tropical cyclones form in the Atlantic Ocean.

The first system, an unnamed subtropical storm, developed on January 4. Hurricane Amy, which formed six months later, caused minor beach erosion and coastal flooding from North Carolina to New Jersey in July, and killed one person when a ship capsized offshore North Carolina. Hurricane Blanche brought strong winds to portions of Atlantic Canada, leaving about $6.2 million (1975 USD) in damage. Hurricane Caroline brought high tides and flooding to northeastern Mexico and Texas, with two drownings in the latter. In late August, Doris became the first tropical storm to be upgraded to a hurricane based solely on satellite imagery, and the first major hurricane that formed from a subtropical storm.

The most significant storm of the season was Hurricane Eloise, a Category 3 hurricane that struck the Florida Panhandle at peak intensity, after bringing severe flooding to the Caribbean. Eloise caused 80 fatalities, including 34 in Puerto Rico, 7 in Dominican Republic, 18 in Haiti, and 21 in the United States, with 4 in Florida. The hurricane left about $560 million in damage in the United States. Hurricane Gladys, a Category 4 hurricane, was the most intense tropical cyclone of the season, but left little impact on land. Two tropical depressions also caused damage and fatalities. Collectively, the tropical cyclones of this season resulted in 87 deaths and about $564.7 million in damage.

== Season summary ==
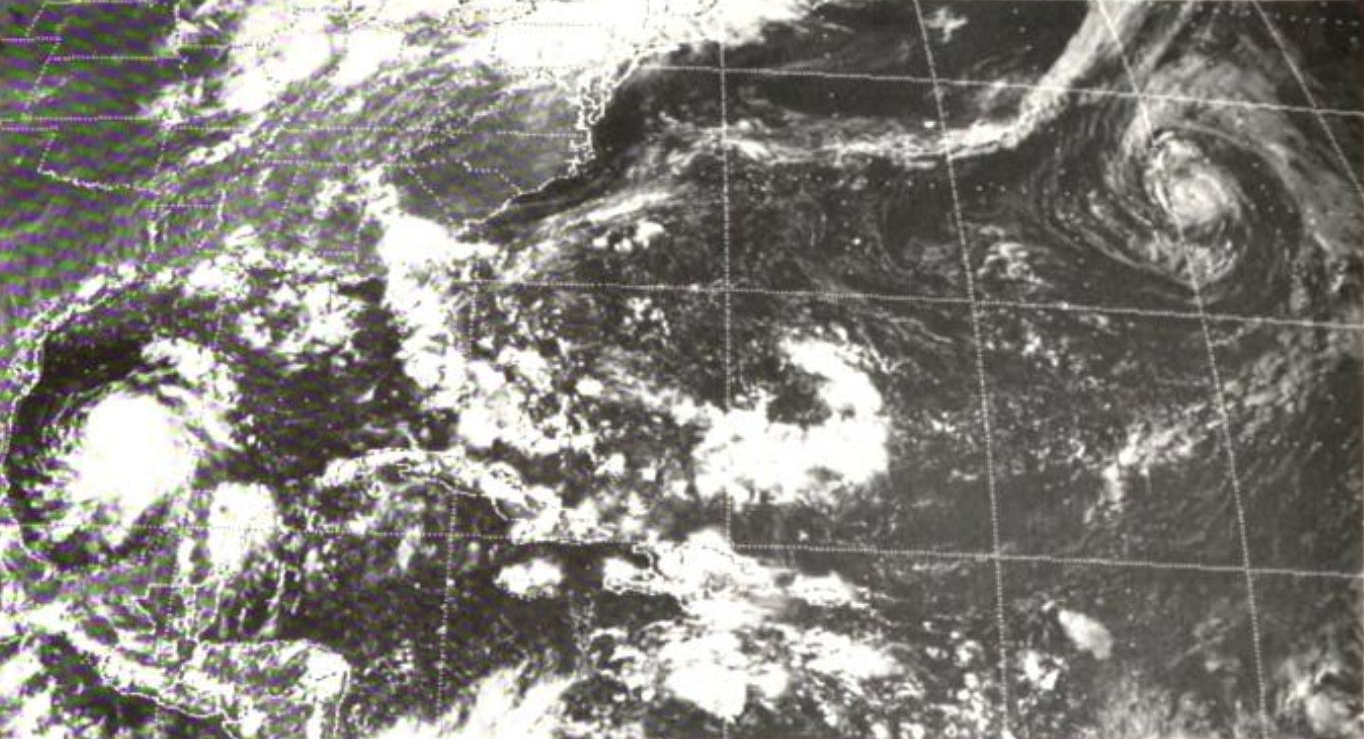
Hurricanes Caroline and Doris together on August 29

The Atlantic hurricane season officially began on June 1, although the first system developed on January 4. A total of 21 tropical depressions developed, but just 12 of them reached tropical or subtropical storm intensity; this was slightly above the 1950–2000 average of 9.6 named storms. Seven of these reached hurricane status, slightly above the 1950–2000 average of 5.9. Furthermore, four storms reached major hurricane status; above the 1950–2000 average of 2.3. Collectively, the cyclones of this season caused at least 87 deaths and over $564.7 million in damage. The Atlantic hurricane season officially ended on November 30, though the final cyclone became extratropical on December 12.

Tropical cyclogenesis began in January, with the development of a subtropical storm on January 4, followed by Hurricane Amy six months later on June 27. Four systems originated in July, including Hurricane Blanche and an unnamed tropical storm. After Tropical Depression Six dissipated on July 30, tropical activity went dormant for over three weeks, ending with the development of a tropical depression that would later become Hurricane Caroline on August 24. Another cyclone, Hurricane Doris, also formed in August. September was the most active month of the season, featuring seven tropical cyclones, including hurricanes Eloise, Faye, and Gladys. In October, three systems formed, one of which intensified into Tropical Storm Hallie. Another tropical storm and tropical depression developed in November. The last system, a subtropical storm, formed on December 9 and transitioned into an extratropical cyclone on December 12.

The season's activity was reflected with an accumulated cyclone energy (ACE) rating of 83. Broadly speaking, ACE is a measure of the power of a tropical storm multiplied by the length of time it existed. Therefore, a storm with a longer duration will have high values of ACE. It is only calculated for full advisories on specific tropical and subtropical systems reaching or exceeding wind speeds of 39 mph (63 km/h). Accordingly, tropical depressions are not included here. After the storm has dissipated, typically after the end of the season, the National Hurricane Center (NHC) reexamines the data. These revisions can lead to a revised ACE total either upward or downward compared to the operational value.

== Systems ==
=== Unnamed subtropical storm ===
- Subtropical storm (SSHWS)
- Duration: January 4 – January 9
- Peak intensity: 65 mph (100 km/h) (1-min); 1001 mbar (hPa)

A previously unknown subtropical storm in January of 1975 was identified during modern reanalysis and designated 24L.

=== Hurricane Amy ===
- Category 1 hurricane (SSHWS)
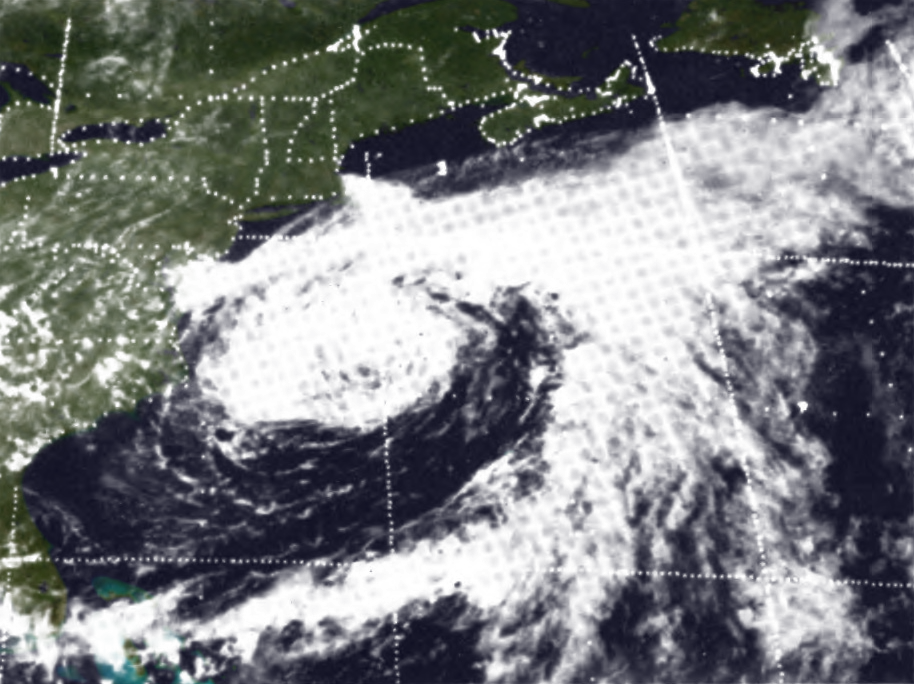
- Duration: June 27 – July 4
- Peak intensity: 80 mph (130 km/h) (1-min); 981 mbar (hPa)

Tropical Storm Amy originated from a weak trough on June 24 accompanied by scattered showers and thunderstorms over Florida. The system tracked westward in response to an upper-tropospheric low over Georgia. By June 26, a surface circulation developed north of the Bahamas and satellite imagery showed a significant increase in convective activity and the National Hurricane Center (NHC) classified the system as a tropical depression early on June 27. On June 28, the system attained tropical storm-status while tracking north-northeast off the coast of North Carolina. By June 29, a trough, moving through the westerlies, rapidly approached the storm, causing the newly designated Amy to turn sharply toward the east. Strong wind shear disorganized the system slightly, leading to Amy featuring subtropical characteristics. By the evening, the strongest winds were not located around the center, but were instead situated between 60 and 90 mi (95 and 140 km) from the center. Convection became displaced from the center of circulation but the storm continued to intensify. Over the following several days, Amy tracked generally northeastward but underwent eastward jogs in response to rapidly moving troughs to the north. Amy neared hurricane intensity several times, beginning on June 30 as maximum winds increased to 70 mph (110 km/h); however, the storm was unable to acquire enough tropical features, and remained predominately subtropical. Gale-force winds at this time extended roughly 125 mi (210 km) out from the center to the north and east. On July 2, a barometric pressure of 981 mbar (hPa; 28.97 inHg) was recorded, the lowest in relation to Amy, as it strengthened into a hurricane, although it was only marginally tropical. The following day, another trough caused the storm to accelerate northeastward. On July 4, Amy passed roughly 170 mi (270 km) southeast of Cape Race, Newfoundland before becoming an extratropical cyclone.

As a tropical depression, Amy produced scattered rainfall in Florida, peaking around 3 in (76 mm) near the Georgia border. Along the North Carolina coast, heavy rain fell as the center of Amy tracked nearby. Many coastal areas recorded more than 3 in (76 mm) with a peak amount of 5.87 in (149 mm) falling in Belhaven, North Carolina. Rough seas from the storm resulted in minor coastal flooding and beach erosion in North Carolina and Virginia. Small craft advisories were issued along the Virginia and North Carolina coastlines as waves up to 15 ft (4.6 m) affected the region. Several beaches were closed due to the rough conditions. In Hampton, Virginia, a funnel cloud spawned by a squall line associated with Amy formed just offshore. On June 30, schooner capsized in rough seas roughly 250 mi (400 km) east of Cape Hatteras, North Carolina, carrying a family of four people. The father, a diabetic, slipped into a coma and died after he was unable to find his insulin pen. The three kids were rescued on July 14.

=== Hurricane Blanche ===
- Category 1 hurricane (SSHWS)
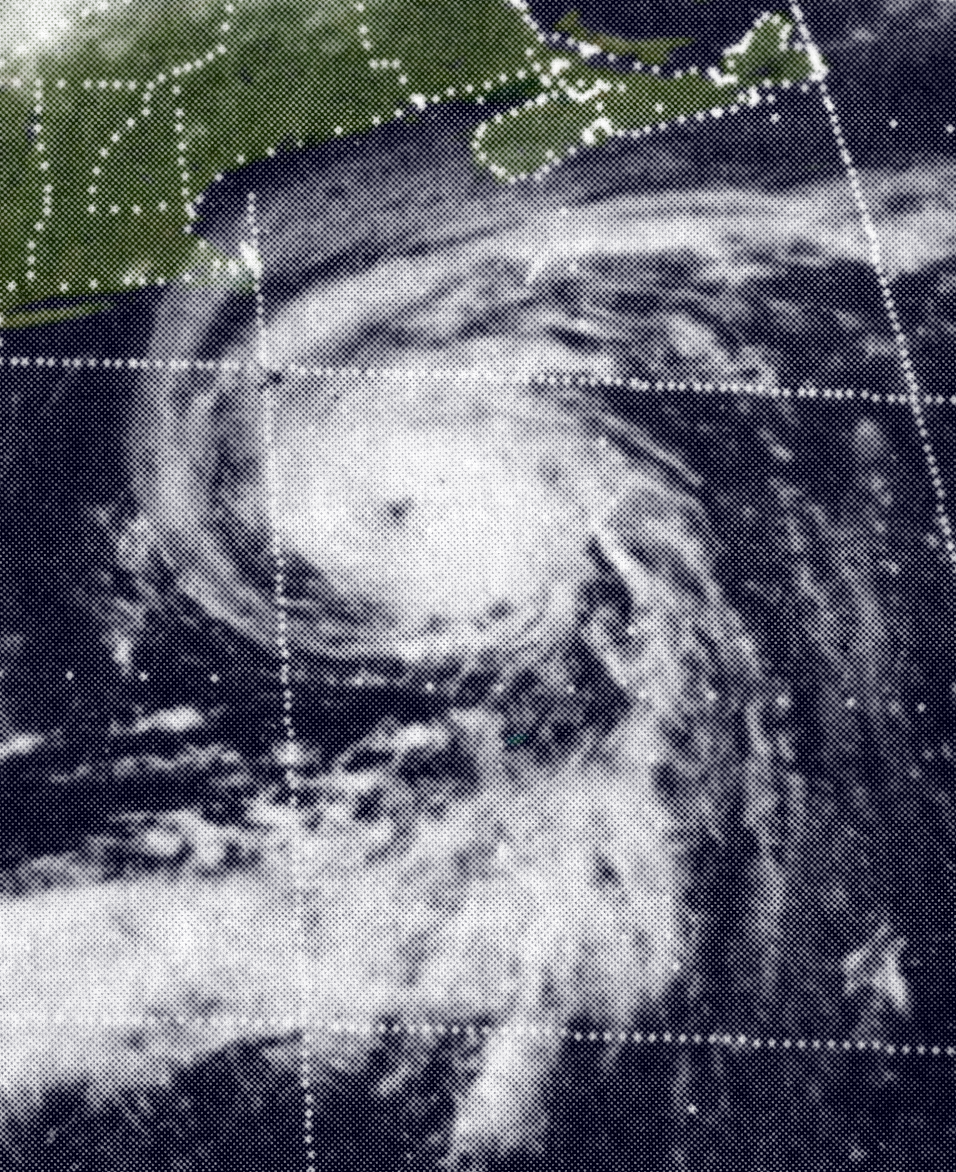
- Duration: July 24 – July 28
- Peak intensity: 80 mph (130 km/h) (1-min); 981 mbar (hPa)

A tropical wave emerged into the Atlantic Ocean from the west coast of Africa on July 14. The system remained weak for about a week, before convection began increasing significantly on July 21. After wind shear decreased, the wave managed to develop into a tropical depression on July 24 about 355 miles (571 km) northeast of the Turks and Caicos Islands. It moved northwestward until early on July 26, when an approaching cold front and associated trough caused the depression to turn northeastward. Around that time, the cyclone intensified into Tropical Storm Blanche. A weakening cold front and baroclinic forces created an environment favorable for intensifying, allowing Blanche to become a Category 1 hurricane on July 27. Slightly further deepening occurred, with the storm peaking with winds of 85 mph (137 km/h) and a minimum barometric pressure of 980 mbar (29 inHg). Before 12:00 UTC on July 28, Blanche made landfall in Barrington, Nova Scotia, with winds of 80 mph (130 km/h). The system quickly transitioned into an extratropical cyclone, which soon dissipated.

In Atlantic Canada, the remnants of Blanche produced high winds gusts up to 70 mph (110 km/h), along with moderate rainfall, peaking at 3.1 in (79 mm) in Chatham, New Brunswick. The strong winds knocked over two mobile homes and destroyed a slaughterhouse, which was under construction. Additionally, trees and power lines were downed, leaving between 500 and 1,000 customers without electricity. The electrical corporation in Nova Scotia suffered about $196,600 in damage. Telephone services were also interrupted. The A. Murray MacKay Bridge was closed after an oil rig broke loose and threatened to strike the bridge. In Prince Edward Island, flights to and from the Charlottetown Airport were canceled, as was ferry service to Nova Scotia. In the province, many homes and businesses lost telephone service. Overall, damage in Canada reached about $6.2 million.

=== Tropical Storm Five ===
- Tropical storm (SSHWS)
- Duration: July 25 – July 26
- Peak intensity: 45 mph (75 km/h) (1-min); 1000 mbar (hPa)

Tropical Storm Five formed on July 24 over the southwestern Gulf of Mexico. Deep convection associated with the system persisted around the center of circulation. Forecasters anticipated the depression would intensify into a tropical storm before landfall. A reconnaissance mission into the cyclone found 50 mph (80 km/h) winds; however, due to the interaction with land, the NHC did not upgrade the depression. Not long after forming, the depression struck Tampico, Tamaulipas. A barometric pressure of 1,007 mbar (1,007 hPa; 29.7 inHg) was recorded in the city, along with sustained winds of 37 mph (60 km/h). The system was no longer monitored by the NHC after landfall and quickly dissipated on July 26.

=== Tropical Depression Six ===
- Tropical depression (SSHWS)
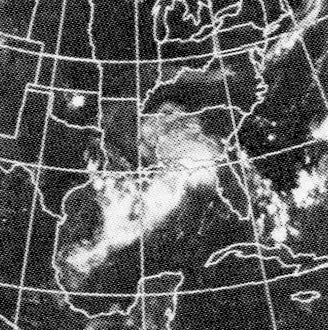
- Duration: July 27 – July 30
- Peak intensity: 35 mph (55 km/h) (1-min); 1009 mbar (hPa)

Tropical Depression Six developed from a trough of low pressure in the northeastern Gulf of Mexico about 60 mi (97 km) southwest of Cape San Blas, Florida, on July 27. The depression moved west-northwestward and strengthened slightly to reach winds of 35 mph (56 km/h), but remained below tropical storm intensity and made landfall in eastern Louisiana. Once inland, the depression slowly weakened and re-curved northwestward on July 30 into Mississippi. Around that time, the depression dissipated. The remnants persisted at least until August 3, at which time it was situated over Arkansas.

The tropical depression dropped heavy rainfall, with some areas of the Florida Panhandle experiencing more than 20 in (510 mm) of precipitation, with a maximum total of 20.84 in (529 mm) observed in DeFuniak Springs. Bay, Gulf, Holmes, Okaloosa, Santa Rosa, Wakulla, and Walton were hardest hit. Numerous roads were flooded and closed, with $3.2 million in damage to that infrastructure. About 500 homes suffered flood damage, 22 of which were destroyed. Damage is estimated to have reached $8.5 million in the state of Florida alone. In southern Alabama, overflowing rivers flooded several businesses and homes in Brewton and East Brewton. Damage in Alabama totaled approximately $300,000. In Mississippi, about 50 families in the vicinity of the Biloxi River were evacuated as the river threatened to exceed its banks, while at least 70 families fled their homes in Moss Point. Water entered about a dozen homes there. Further north, about 100 residences were evacuated in Canton, where some businesses suffered water damage. A total of 12 homes in Vicksburg were flooded. The storm left three fatalities, with two in Florida and one in Alabama.

=== Hurricane Caroline ===
- Category 3 hurricane (SSHWS)
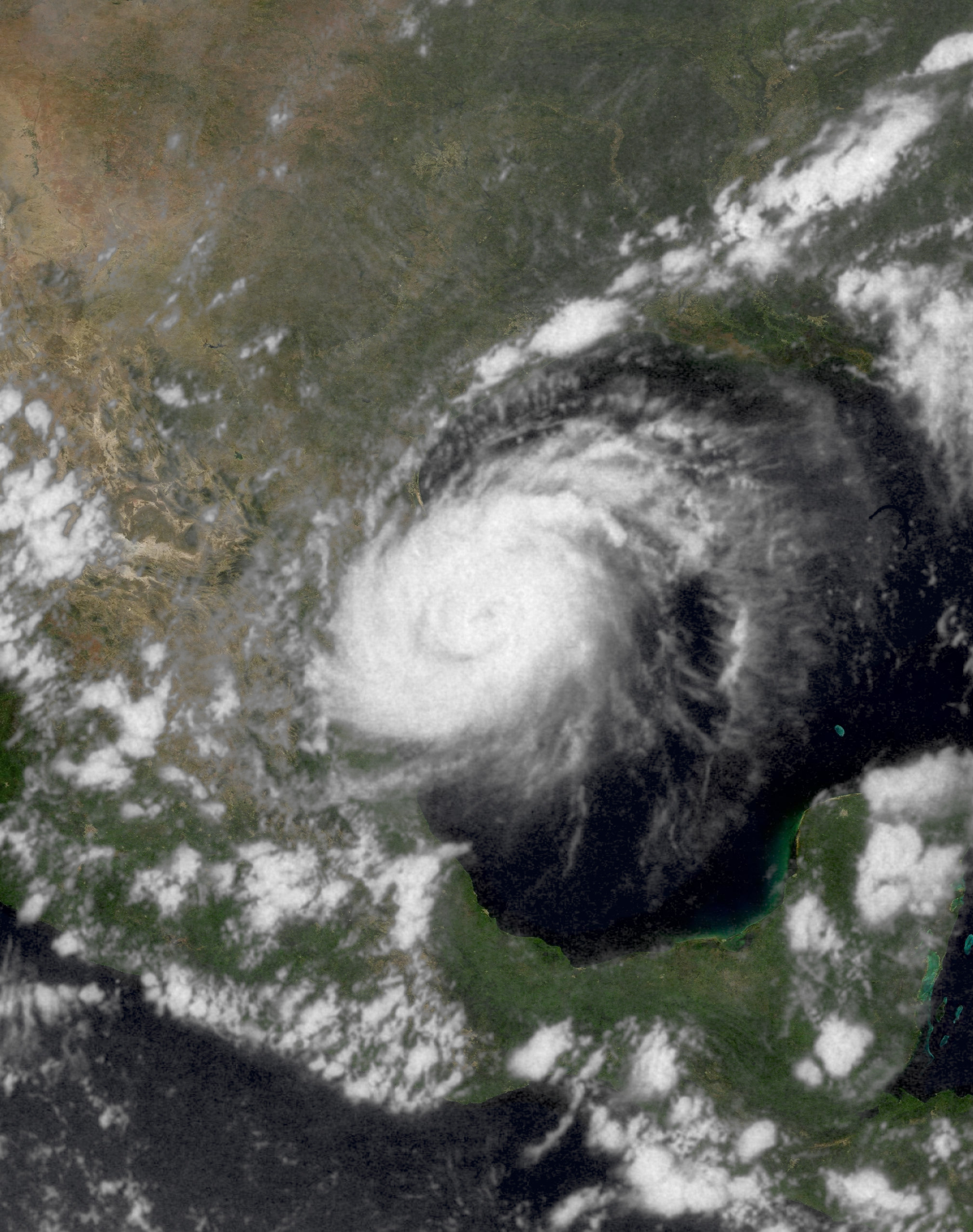
- Duration: August 24 – September 2
- Peak intensity: 115 mph (185 km/h) (1-min); 961 mbar (hPa)

A tropical wave exited the west coast of Africa on August 15 and rapidly moved westward. On August 24, the system developed into a tropical depression near the southeastern Bahamas. Soon after, it crossed Cuba and degenerated back into a tropical wave. The system redeveloped into a tropical depression on August 27 as it continued westward into the Gulf of Mexico. Passing just north of the Yucatán Peninsula, the depression strengthened into Tropical Storm Caroline on August 29. The storm slowed quickly attained hurricane status as it approached land. Two National Oceanic and Atmospheric Administration (NOAA) planes conducted experiments to study the environment and winds in and around the eye. Caroline intensified further into a major hurricane, with peak winds of115 mph (185 km/h) and a minimum pressure of 961 millibars (28.4 inHg). On August 31, Caroline made landfall in a rural area of Tamaulipas in northeast Mexico, about 100 mi (160 km) south of Brownsville. Caroline rapidly weakened to a tropical depression twelve hours after landfall and dissipated on September 1 over northeastern Mexico.

Ahead of Caroline's landfall, hundreds of people in Mexico evacuated to shelters. Several oil rigs off Texas evacuated personnel. Along the Mexican coast, Caroline produced 10 ft (3.0 m) storm tides, causing significant damage to several small villages. Farther inland, 5–10 in (130–250 mm) of rain. Flooding rains forced 1,000 people to evacuate and left moderate damage to homes and businesses. The precipitation ended an eight-month drought that was affecting inland portions of northern Mexico and decreasing the area's corn production. Portions of south Texas also experienced heavy rainfall, with 11.93 in (303 mm) at Port Isabel. Brownsville broke a record for the highest amount of precipitation observed on a day in August. Two deaths occurred from drowning in Galveston.

=== Hurricane Doris ===
- Category 3 hurricane (SSHWS)
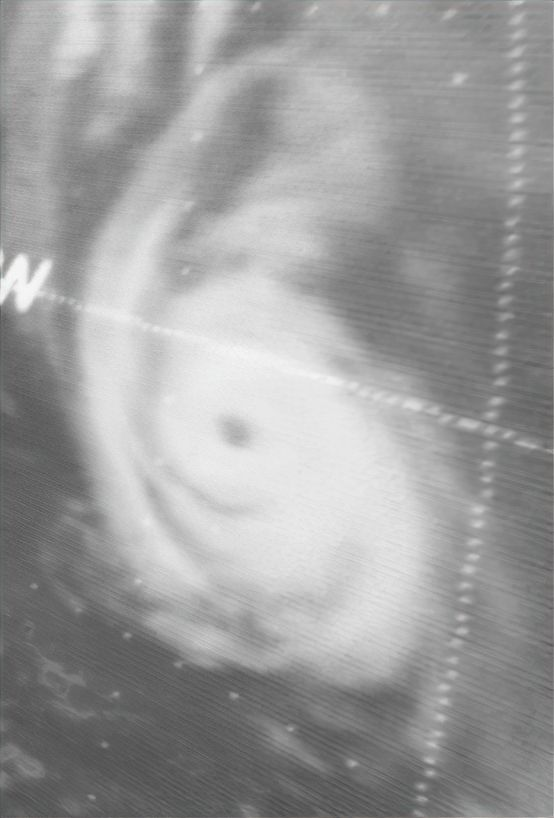
- Duration: August 28 – September 4
- Peak intensity: 115 mph (185 km/h) (1-min); 945 mbar (hPa)

A low pressure area developed within a frontal band over the central Atlantic on August 27. At 12:00 UTC on the following day, the system developed into a subtropical storm while situated 930 mi (1,500 km) southwest of the Azores. The subtropical classification was due to the lack of a central dense overcast (CDO), with the showers and thunderstorms mainly consisting of a strong band of convention located southeast of the center, as well as its association to the frontal band. Because the system was out of the authorized range of reconnaissance aircraft flights, satellites and ships were used to monitor the storm's intensity and tropical status. After satellite imagery indicated that the system became more symmetrical, developed CDO, and detached from the frontal system, the cyclone was reclassified as Tropical Storm Doris on August 29.

Doris made meteorological history when, on August 31, it became the first Atlantic hurricane ever to be upgraded to hurricane intensity solely on the basis of satellite pictures, via the Dvorak technique. The cyclone then curved northward and intensified further during the next few days, becoming a Category 2 hurricane early on September 2. Based on the Dvorak technique, it is estimated that Doris peaked with maximum sustained winds of 115 mph (185 km/h) and a minimum barometric pressure of 945 mbar (27.9 inHg) shortly thereafter, peaking as a Category 3 hurricane. By September 3, the hurricane began interacting with a non-tropical low pressure area. On the following day, Doris quickly weakened to a tropical storm and transitioned into an extratropical cyclone about 830 mi (1,340 km) south-southeast of Cape Race, Newfoundland, around 06:00 UTC. The extratropical remnants weakened and then dissipated late on September 4.

=== Hurricane Eloise ===
- Category 3 hurricane (SSHWS)
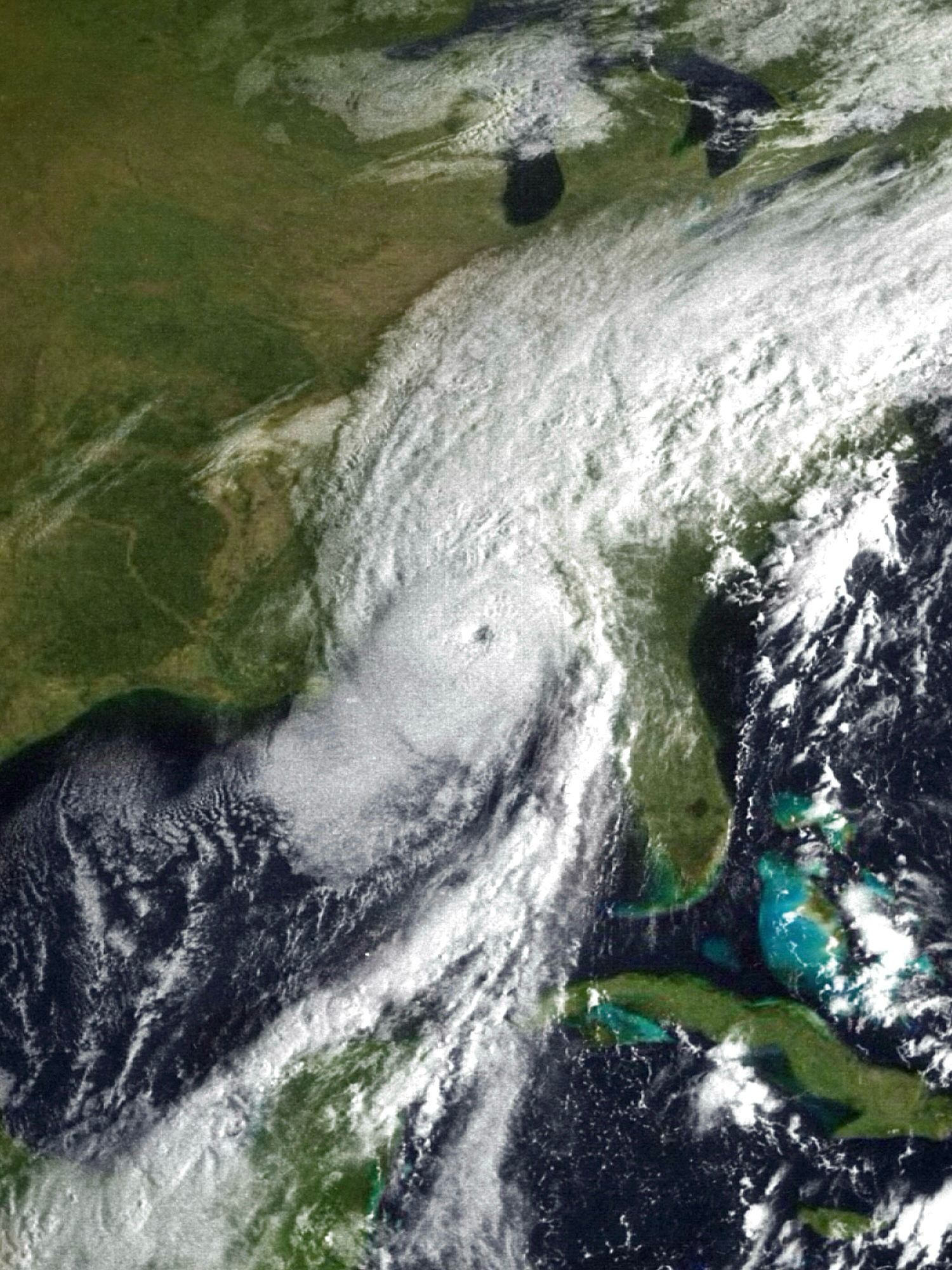
- Duration: September 13 – September 24
- Peak intensity: 125 mph (205 km/h) (1-min); 950 mbar (hPa)

A tropical wave developed into a tropical depression on September 13 to the east of the Virgin Islands. The system tracked westward and strengthened into Tropical Storm Eloise while passing to the north of Puerto Rico. Eloise briefly reached hurricane intensity soon thereafter, but weakened back to a tropical storm around landfall over Hispaniola. The cyclone emerged into open waters of the northern Caribbean Sea. After striking the northern Yucatán Peninsula, Eloise turned northward and re-intensified. In the Gulf of Mexico, the cyclone quickly deepened, becoming a Category 3 hurricane on September 23. The hurricane made landfall west of Panama City, Florida, before moving inland across Alabama and dissipating on September 24.

The storm produced heavy rainfall throughout Puerto Rico and Hispaniola, causing extensive flooding that left severe damage 59 fatalities. Thousands of people in these areas became homeless as flood waters submerged numerous communities. As Eloise progressed westward, it affected Cuba to a lesser extent. In advance of the storm, about 100,000 residents evacuated from the Gulf Coast region. Upon making landfall in Florida, Eloise generated wind gusts of 155 mph (249 km/h), which demolished hundreds of buildings in the area. The storm's severe winds, waves, and storm surge left numerous beaches, piers, and other coastal structures heavily impaired.

Wind-related damage extended into inland Alabama and Georgia. Further north, torrential rains along the entire East Coast of the United States created an unprecedented and far-reaching flooding event, especially into the Mid-Atlantic States. In that region, an additional 17 people died as a result of freshwater flooding from the post-tropical storm; infrastructural and geological effects were comparable to those from Hurricane Agnes three years prior. Across the United States, damage amounted to approximately $560 million. The storm killed 80 people along its entire track.

=== Hurricane Faye ===
- Category 1 hurricane (SSHWS)
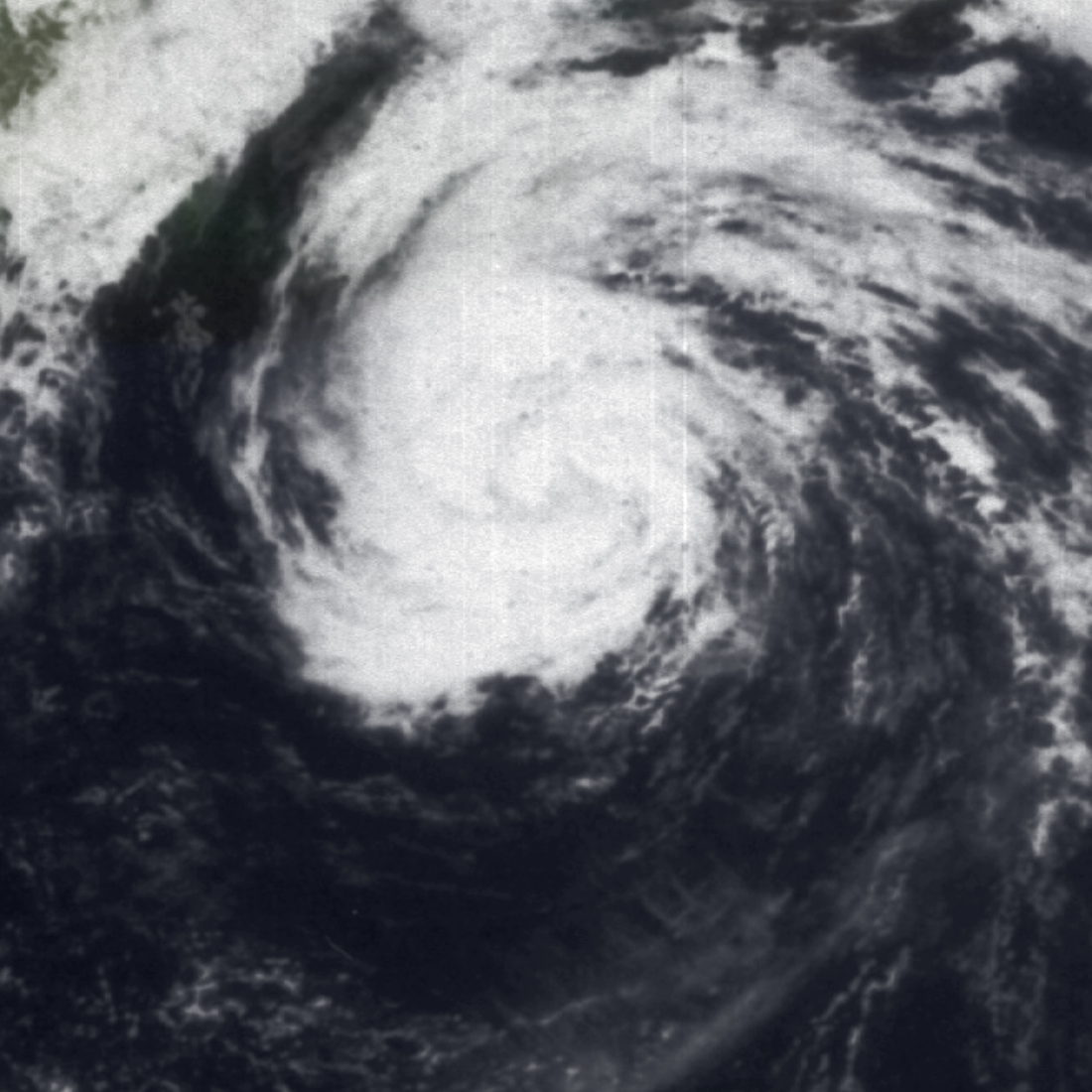
- Duration: September 18 – September 29
- Peak intensity: 90 mph (150 km/h) (1-min); 977 mbar (hPa)

A tropical wave emerged into the Atlantic from the west coast of Africa on September 14. After detaching from the Intertropical Convergence Zone on September 18, the wave quickly developed into a tropical depression about 575 mi (925 km) west of the Cabo Verde Islands. Moving northwestward, the depression intensified, according to ships and satellite imagery, becoming Tropical Storm Faye on September 19. The cyclone then moved westward and was unable to intensify further due to increasing wind shear, before weakening to a tropical depression on September 23. Shortly thereafter, Faye turned to the north, crossing an upper trough axis over the central Atlantic. Southwesterly flow aloft allowed the system to re-strengthen, with Faye becoming a tropical storm again on September 25. Faye accelerated to the northwest and deepened into a Category 1 hurricane early on September 26.

Around 23:00 UTC on September 26, the cyclone passed about 35 mi (56 km) east of Bermuda. Winds up to 69 mph (111 km/h) and heavy rains were recorded on the island. Up to 2.8 in (71 mm) of rain fell in Bermuda from the hurricane. Already severely impacted by flooding from Eloise days earlier, New England prepared for additional flooding from Faye. The National Weather Service issued flash flood watches, resulting in more evacuations. Although the system weakened late on September 28, the storm reached its minimum barometric pressure of 977 mbar (28.9 inHg), observed by a reconnaissance aircraft. Faye then curved eastward and lost tropical characteristics, becoming extratropical at 12:00 UTC on September 29, while situated northwest of Corvo Island in the Azores.

=== Hurricane Gladys ===
- Category 4 hurricane (SSHWS)
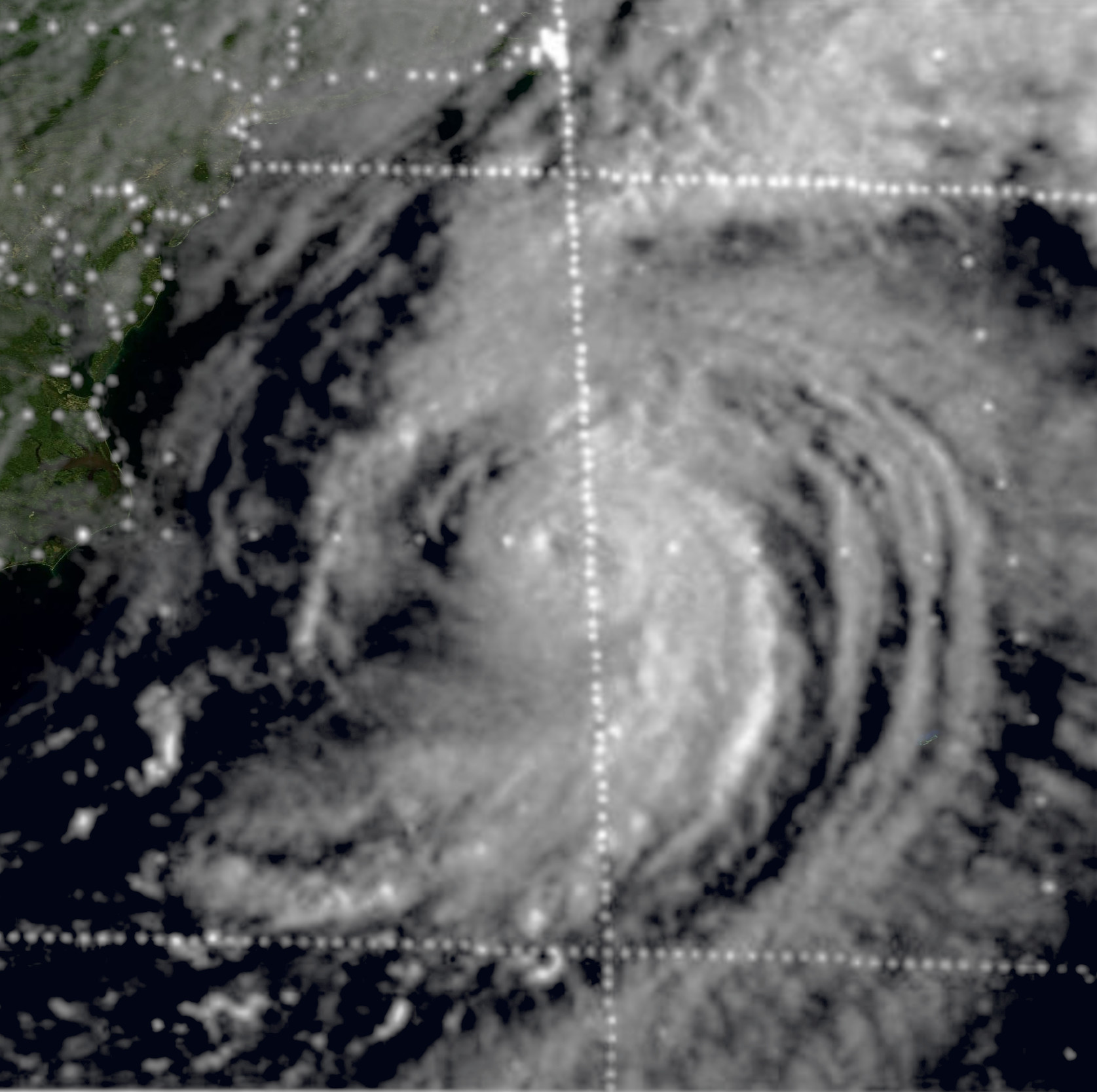
- Duration: September 22 – October 3
- Peak intensity: 150 mph (240 km/h) (1-min); 939 mbar (hPa)

On September 17, a tropical wave emerged into the Atlantic Ocean off the western coast of Africa. The disturbance followed another tropical wave which became Hurricane Faye several days later, before turning west near the 11th parallel. Based on estimates from the Dvorak Technique, the wave was designated a tropical depression at 18:00 UTC on September 22. Due to favorable conditions such as low wind shear and warm sea surface temperatures, the depression strengthened into Tropical Storm Gladys on September 24. Gladys slowly intensified, and on September 25, it strengthened into a hurricane. Strong wind shear caused Gladys to fluctuate between Category 1 and tropical storm intensity from then through September 29. After passing through the trough that generated the wind shear, the storm began to strengthen again. While moving about 350 mi (560 km) north of Puerto Rico on September 30, the storm became a Category 2 hurricane as an eye appeared on satellite imagery. Early on October 2, the storm strengthened into a Category 4 hurricane. At 08:46 UTC on October 2, Hurricane Hunters measured maximum sustained winds of 150 mph (240 km/h) and a minimum barometric pressure of 939 mbar (27.7 inHg) while Gladys moved northeastward, making it one of the most intense high-latitude storms ever observed. Despite its distance from Cape Hatteras, the system was briefly observed on radar. It became the farthest tropical cyclone from the United States to be observed by radar in the Atlantic basin since Hurricane Carla in 1961 and one of few at the time to be seen on radar over 150 mi (240 km) offshore the country. Thereafter, the storm weakened slightly, and was downgraded to a Category 3 hurricane early on October 3. Accelerating at unusually high speeds, Gladys became extratropical while passing 70 mi (110 km) southeast of Cape Race, Newfoundland, on October 3 and merged with a larger extratropical cyclone on October 4.

While over the Atlantic Ocean, a National Oceanic and Atmospheric Administration (NOAA) C-130 hurricane hunter aircraft flew into Gladys on October 1 on a research mission. The mission was to study the storm and use the information to improve seeding operations for the now-defunct Project Stormfury. A hurricane watch was issued for North Carolina's Outer Banks on October 1, extending from Cape Lookout to Kitty Hawk. Despite warnings, about 40 fishermen went to Cape Point near Cape Hatteras due to the "increased feeding activities" of fish during rough seas. Residents along the Outer Banks evacuated to hotels in Elizabeth City, and four United States Coast Guard servicemen stationed at a lighthouse in Cape Hatteras were evacuated. While passing the Outer Banks, a campground and road was closed due to 8 ft (2.4 m) waves. While tracking rapidly to the southeast of Newfoundland, light rainfall was observed, including 1.46 in (37 mm) of precipitation in St. John's.

=== Subtropical Depression Eighteen ===
- Subtropical depression (SSHWS)
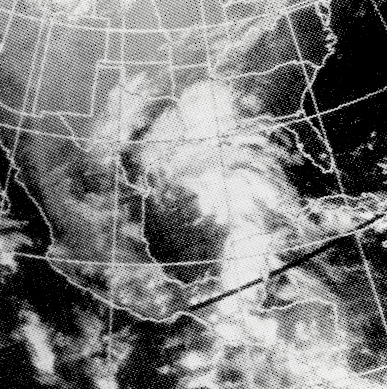
- Duration: October 15 – October 17
- Peak intensity: 35 mph (55 km/h) (1-min); 1002 mbar (hPa)

A subtropical depression developed in the southern Gulf of Mexico about 125 mi (201 km) northwest of Campeche City in Mexico on October 15. Moving around the western periphery of a subtropical ridge, the depression intensified while moving northeast towards the central Gulf Coast of the United States due to an advancing cold front. However, the depression remained below tropical storm status, peaking with maximum sustained winds of 35 mph (56 km/h). Early on October 17, the depression made landfall near Cocodrie, Louisiana. Shortly thereafter, the depression became an extratropical cyclone as it through the Southeast and Mid-Atlantic states, before moving offshore New England.

Heavy rains fell along the frontal boundary ahead of the system, with a peak total of 9.01 in (229 mm) of precipitation observed in Aimwell, Louisiana. Flooding occurred across eastern Louisiana, central Mississippi, the western Florida Panhandle, central Tennessee, western Virginia, and eastern New York. In Jackson, Mississippi, the heavy precipitation established a new daily rainfall record for October 16 and a new 24-hour rainfall record for the month of October. Eight bridges were damaged in Jackson County, Tennessee, due to the floods. Heavy rains left heavy damage to the soybean and corn crops in Hickman and Marion counties in Tennessee. Six tornadoes were reported in association with this tropical depression, including two in Alabama, two in northwest Florida, and two in North Carolina. One person died due to flooding in Mississippi.

=== Tropical Storm Hallie ===
- Tropical storm (SSHWS)
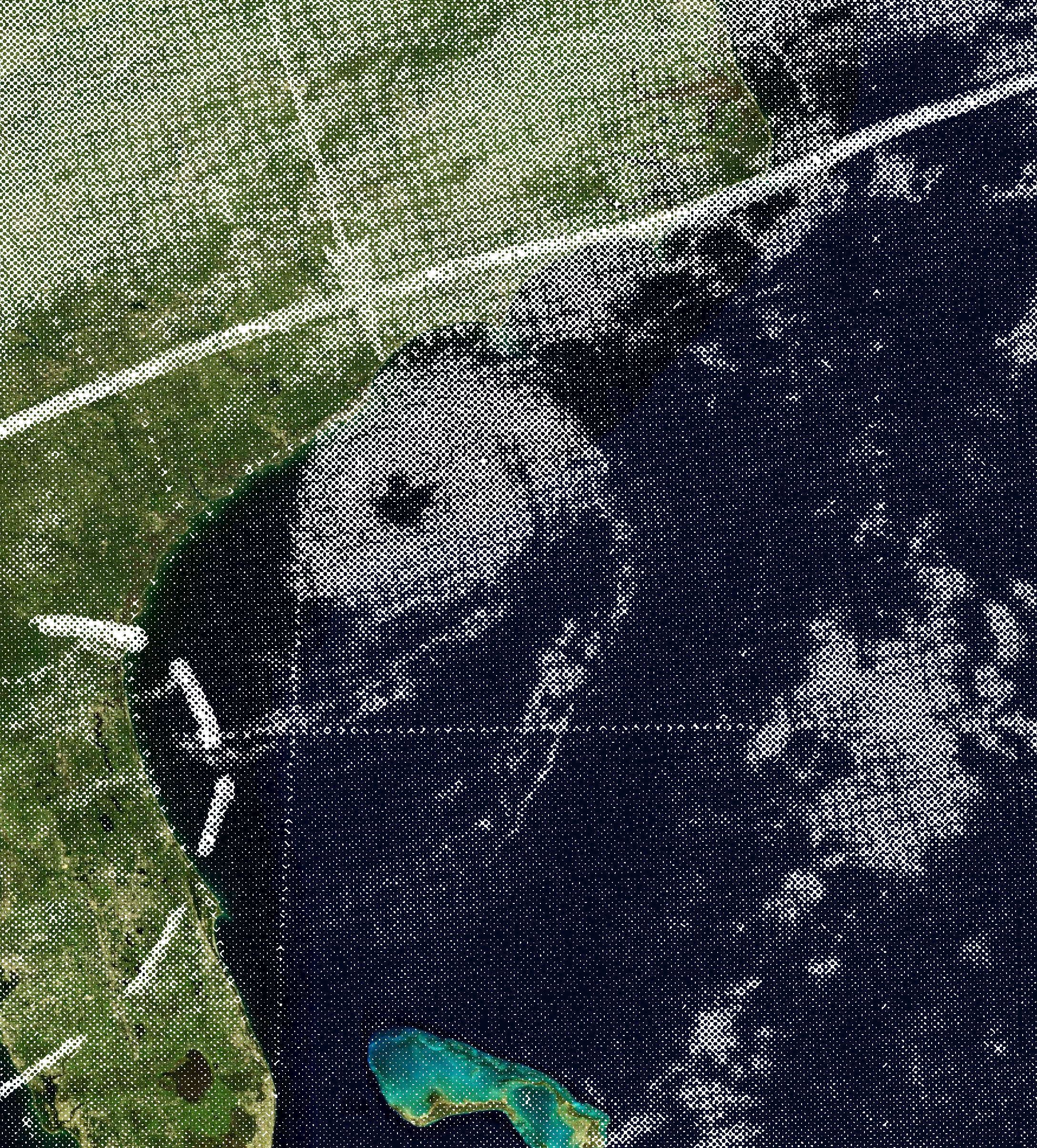
- Duration: October 24 – October 27
- Peak intensity: 50 mph (85 km/h) (1-min); 1002 mbar (hPa)

A frontal trough exited the East Coast of the United States on October 18. The southern portion of the system became stationary near the Bahamas; simultaneously, a cut-off upper-level low formed in the same region. The disturbance produced scattered convection, until a tropical wave merged with it on October 23. The system developed into a subtropical depression by October 24, while located about 100 mi (160 km) east of Florida. The depression drifted northward on October 25 and eventually acquired tropical characteristics by October 26. Due to tropical storm force winds, the system was reclassified as Tropical Storm Hallie, while situated about 100 mi (160 km) east of Charleston, South Carolina. Hallie accelerated to the northeast starting on October 26. By the following day, Hallie peaked with winds of 50 mph (80 km/h). Later that day, Hallie merged with a frontal zone and became extratropical offshore Virginia.

The precursor to Hallie produced extensive cloudiness precipitation in the Bahamas. On October 27, gale warnings were issued for portions of the Outer Banks of North Carolina, and small craft advisories were posted for coastal areas from Georgia to Virginia. Tides along the North Carolina and Virginia coasts were generally between 1 and 2 ft (0.30 and 0.61 m) above normal. Generally light precipitation fell, peaking at 2.55 in (65 mm) in Manteo, North Carolina. Additionally, the pressure gradient between Hallie and a high pressure area increased winds across much of the East Coast of the United States.

=== Tropical Storm Twenty-One ===
- Tropical storm (SSHWS)
- Duration: November 9 – November 12
- Peak intensity: 40 mph (65 km/h) (1-min); 1004 mbar (hPa)

On November 8, Tropical Depression Twenty-One developed off the coast of Honduras. Moving north-northwestward, the system gradually intensified. Between November 9 and 10, reconnaissance missions into the storm found winds of 40 mph (64 km/h); however, the NHC did not operationally upgrade it to a tropical storm, because weakening occurred shortly thereafter. It would be upgraded in reanalysis. Over the following few days, the system gradually turned southward and made landfall in the southwestern edge of the Yucatán Peninsula on November 12, shortly before dissipating.

=== Unnamed subtropical storm ===
- Subtropical storm (SSHWS)
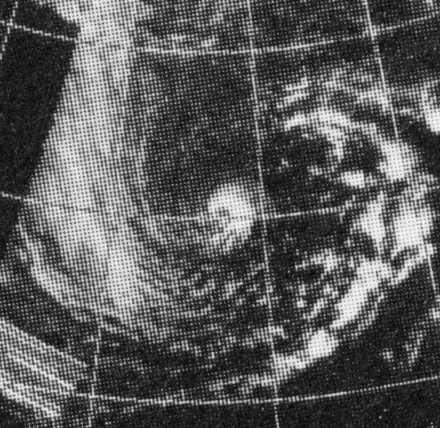
- Duration: December 9 – December 12
- Peak intensity: 70 mph (110 km/h) (1-min); 985 mbar (hPa)

An extratropical low pressure system developed into a subtropical storm about 615 mi (990 km) east-southeast of Newfoundland, at 12:00 UTC on December 9. The storm moved rapidly southward and intensified, reaching maximum sustained winds of 70 mph (110 km/h) about 24 hours later, based on observations from an unidentified ship. Shortly thereafter, sustained winds began decreasing. However, late on December 11, the storm attained its minimum barometric pressure of 985 mbar (29.1 inHg). The system began moving southeastward and then eastward. By 12:00 UTC on December 12, the cyclone weakened to a subtropical depression. Moving northward, it dissipated 24 hours later, while situated about 505 mi (813 km) south-southwest of the Azores.

=== Other systems ===
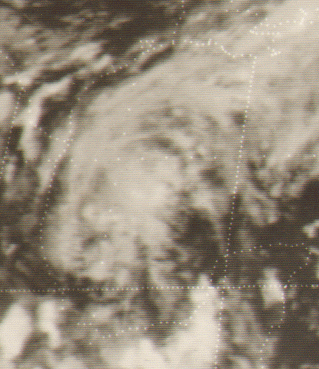
Tropical Depression Eleven over the Gulf of Mexico on September 7

In addition to the nameable storms, Tropical Depression Six, and Subtropical Depression Eighteen, several other depressions formed during the 1975 Atlantic hurricane season. The first such system, Tropical Depression Three, developed northeast of the Bahamas on July 4. Tracking northeastward, the system did not intensify and was last noted over open waters midday on July 5. In early September, two tropical depressions developed near the Cabo Verde islands. The first of these two, designated AL101975, formed on September 3 in the far eastern Atlantic only about 65 mi (105 km) east of the Mauritania-Senegal border. Moving slowly northwestward, the depression dissipated north for the Cabo Verde islands on September 6. The next system, AL091975, developed on September 4. After moving generally westward, the cyclone dissipated on September 8 approximately 430 mi (690 km) east-northeast of Barbados.

Short-lived Tropical Depression Eleven developed on September 6 over the Gulf of Mexico, then degenerated on the following day. Tropical Depression Sixteen developed near the Gulf of Honduras on September 25 and tracked slowly westward. By September 29, the depression degenerated into a remnant low just offshore Othón P. Blanco, Quintana Roo. Tropical Depression Twenty formed on October 28 over the southwestern Caribbean Sea and tracked northwest. After turning nearly due west, the depression briefly made landfall near the Nicaragua–Honduras border and made another landfall in southern Belize shortly before dissipating on October 30. In late November, Tropical Depression Twenty-Two formed over the central Atlantic. A short-lived system, it formed on November 29 and dissipated on November 30.

As part of the Atlantic hurricane reanalysis project, three tropical depressions were removed from HURDAT in 2026, identified as AL011975, AL121975, AL171975. These systems were previously believed to have existed from June 24 to June 29, September 11 to September 14, and October 3 to October 5, respectively.

== Storm names ==
The following list of names was used for named storms that formed in the North Atlantic in 1975. Storms were named Amy, Caroline, Doris, Eloise, and Faye for the first (and in the case of Eloise, only) time in 1975.

- Amy
- Blanche
- Caroline
- Doris
- Eloise
- Faye
- Gladys
- Hallie
- Ingrid (unused)
- Julia (unused)
- Kitty (unused)
- Lilly (unused)
- Mabel (unused)
- Niki (unused)
- Opal (unused)
- Peggy (unused)
- Ruby (unused)
- Sheila (unused)
- Tilda (unused)
- Vicky (unused)
- Winnie (unused)

=== Retirement ===
On account of severe damage associated with the storm, the name Eloise was later retired. Due to the naming lists changing in 1979, no replacement name was selected.

== Season effects ==
This is a table of all of the storms that formed in the 1975 Atlantic hurricane season. It includes their name, duration, peak classification and intensities, areas affected, damage, and death totals. Deaths in parentheses are additional and indirect (an example of an indirect death would be a traffic accident), but were still related to that storm. Damage and deaths include totals while the storm was extratropical, a wave, or a low, and all of the damage figures are in 1975 USD.

Saffir–Simpson scale
TD	TS	C1	C2	C3	C4	C5

1975 North Atlantic tropical cyclone season statistics
Storm name	Dates active	Storm category at peak intensity	Max 1-min wind mph (km/h)	Min. press. (mbar)	Areas affected	Damage (US$)	Deaths	Ref(s).
Unnamed	January 4–9	Subtropical storm	65 (100)	1001	None	None	None	
Amy	June 27 – July 4	Category 1 hurricane	80 (130)	981	North Carolina, Newfoundland	Minimal	1	
Three	July 4–5	Tropical depression	35 (55)	1012	None	None	None	
Blanche	July 24–28	Category 1 hurricane	85 (140)	981	Maine, Nova Scotia	$6.2 million	None	
Five	July 24–26	Tropical storm	45 (75)	1000	Mexico	Unknown	None	
Six	July 29 – August 1	Tropical depression	35 (55)	1009	Louisiana, Mississippi, Alabama, Florida	>$8.5 million	3	
Caroline	August 24 – September 2	Category 3 hurricane	115 (185)	961	Cuba, Yucatán Peninsula	Unknown	2	
Doris	August 28 – September 4	Category 3 hurricane	115 (185)	945	None	None	None	
Nine	September 3–6	Tropical depression	35 (55)	Unknown	None	None	None	
Ten	September 4–8	Tropical depression	35 (55)	Unknown	None	None	None	
Eleven	September 6–8	Tropical depression	30 (45)	1008	Mexico	Unknown	None	
Eloise	September 13–24	Category 3 hurricane	125 (205)	950	Puerto Rico, Hispaniola, Florida, Alabama	>$550 million	80	
Faye	September 18–29	Category 1 hurricane	90 (150)	977	Bermuda	Minimal	None	
Gladys	September 22 – October 3	Category 4 hurricane	150 (240)	939	None	None	None	
Sixteen	September 25–29	Tropical depression	30 (45)	1010	Yucatán Peninsula	Unknown	None	
Eighteen	October 15–16	Subtropical depression	35 (55)	1002	Louisiana, Mississippi, Alabama, Florida	Unknown	1	
Hallie	October 24–27	Tropical storm	50 (85)	1002	South Carolina, North Carolina, Virginia	Minimal	None	
Twenty	October 28–30	Tropical depression	35 (55)	1004	Nicaragua, Honduras, Belize	Unknown	None	
Twenty-One	November 9–11	Tropical storm	40 (65)	1004	Honduras, Yucatán Peninsula	Unknown	None	
Twenty-Two	November 29–30	Tropical depression	35 (55)	1003	None	None	None	
Unnamed	December 9–12	Subtropical storm	70 (110)	985	None	None	None	
Season aggregates
21 systems	January 4 – December 12		150 (240)	939		>$564.7 million	87	

== See also ==
- 1975 North Indian Ocean cyclone season
- 1975 Pacific hurricane season
- 1975 Pacific typhoon season
- Australian cyclone seasons: 1974–75, 1975–76
- South Pacific cyclone seasons: 1974–75, 1975–76
- South-West Indian Ocean cyclone seasons: 1974–75, 1975–76
- South Atlantic tropical cyclone
- Mediterranean tropical-like cyclone
