= Freeport High School (Florida) =

Location
- 12615 U.S. Highway 331 South; Freeport, Florida; United States
- Coordinates: 30.5005°N 86.1331°W

Information
- Type: Public
- Motto: One Town, One team, One Family
- School district: Walton County School District
- NCES School ID: 120198002022
- Principal: Donna Simmons
- Teaching staff: 37.50 (on FTE basis)
- Grades: 9 to 12
- Enrollment: 677 (2023-2024)
- Student to teacher ratio: 18.05
- Colors: Orange and blue
- Athletics conference: FHSAA Class 1A
- Mascot: Bulldog
- Website: fhs.walton.k12.fl.us

Freeport High School is a public high school in Freeport, Walton County, Florida, United States. It is a part of the Walton County School District.

The school's mascot is the Bulldog. The school colors are orange and blue.

== Notable alumni ==
- Regina Jaquess, 2017 World Championship Gold Medalist
