= Walton County School District (Florida) =

School district in Florida, United States

Walton County School District is a school district headquartered in DeFuniak Springs, Florida. Its boundary is that of Walton County.

== History ==
From the 2017-2018 school year to the 2021-2022 school year, the school district received "A" ratings from the Florida Department of Education based on state testing measures. As of 2022, the district had the third highest accountability scores of Florida school districts, and was on the state's "High Academic Performance" list.

By 2021, due to an increasing number of students in the district, the district purchased land in the south of the county so another school could be built.

In 2022 Florida Citizens Alliance made a list of books which it deemed objectionable, many of which were related to LGBTQI themes. The Walton County district used the list to remove library books.

== Schools ==
High Schools

- Freeport High
- Paxton High School (Florida) in Paxton, Florida
- South Walton High School
- Walton High School (DeFuniak Springs, Florida)

Middle Schools

- Emerald Coast Middle
- Freeport Middle
- Walton Middle
- Walton In”10”sity School of Excellence (In”10”sity means "intensity")

Elementary Schools

- Bay Elementary
- Van R. Butler Elementary
- Dune Lakes Elementary
- Freeport Elementary
  - Circa 2016, the enrollment was around 650. By 2022 the enrollment was at 1,125.
- Mossy Head Elementary
- Maude Saunders Elementary
- West DeFuniak Elementary
