= Florida State Road 83 =

State highway in Florida, United States

State Road 83
- Florida State Road 83, signed (red) and unsigned (blue)

Route information
- Maintained by FDOT
- Length: 45.327 mi (72.947 km)

Major junctions
- South end: US 98 near Santa Rosa Beach
- US 90 / US 331 in DeFuniak Springs
- North end: SR 153 towards Samson, AL

Location
- Country: United States
- State: Florida
- Counties: Walton

Highway system
- Florida State Highway System; Interstate; US; State; Former; Pre‑1945; Toll; Scenic
← SR 82	→ SR 84

State Road 83 (SR 83) is the state designation for U.S. Route 331 between US 98(SR 30) in Santa Rosa Beach and US 90(SR 10) in DeFuniak Springs. It also includes an independent route from DeFuniak Springs to the Florida-Alabama State Line. The entire route is in Walton County.

== Route description ==
State Road 83 begins at U.S. Route 98 in Santa Rosa Beach. From there it runs north towards a long concrete slab bridge over Choctawhatchee Bay. The bridge ends at Wheeler Point, and the road makes a sharp curve to the northeast where it encounters an intersection with County Road 3280, and then turns straight north again. Running along the eastern edge of Mallery Bayou, and LaGrange Bayou, the road makes a less drastic northeastern curve at the bridge over Ramsey Brook, and it eventually intersects State Road 20 on the eastern edge of Freeport. The road continues on this trajectory thanks to a 2007 FDOT construction project, but eventually straightens before approaching the northern terminus of State Road 883 (former US 331/SR 83) in Owl's Head. From that point it runs along the eastern edge of Eglin Air Force Base, which includes the Eglin Wildlife Management Area. This territory ends across the street from the intersection of Edgewood Circle. After the intersection with Indian Creek Ranch Road, US 331/SR 83 makes a slight northwest curve to meet the southern end of County Road 278 (Coy Burgess Loop). The road runs straight north from there and becomes a divided highway as it approaches the north end of CR 278 just south of Interstate 10 at Exit 85 in DeFuniak Springs. Within the city, US 331/SR 83 remains a divided highway running in the same trajectory, where the only intersection of any level of importance is CR 280(Bob Sikes Road). After the intersection with Myrtle Avenue, it takes another slight curve to the northeast. Two more local intersections will be encountered before the road runs beneath a bridge for the CSX P&A Subdivision, and a parallel bridge with Baldwin Avenue just before the intersection with U.S. Route 90, where both U.S. Route 331 and SR 83 split into two separate concurrencies; US 331 turns left while SR 83 turns right. US 90/SR 83 then intersects 12th Street where they enter the DeFuniak Springs Historic District until it heads north onto North Ninth Street. US 90 doesn't leave the historic district until the intersection of Second Street, but SR 83 leaves the district immediately.

With the exception of some random turn lanes, all of which are in DeFuniak Springs, independent State Road 83 is entirely two-lanes wide. Part of the road runs along the DeFuniak Springs city line between Burlich Avenue and Walton Road. North of there, it passes by the site of the Walton County Fair, and later a driveway shared by the Walton County Landfill, and Walton Corrections Institute. After intersecting roads of only local importance, SR 83 encounters the southern terminus of CR 1883, which is also shared with the intersection of Sunrise Drive. Shortly after this, it passes the 10 Lakes housing development and then an intersection with the eastern terminus of CR 192.

Entering Glendale, SR 83 encounters a blinker-light intersection with CR 185, which runs northeast toward Leonia in Holmes County, and then to Geneva, Alabama. After crossing a bridge over Gum Creek, it serves as the eastern terminus of CR 1084, which also shares an intersection with Bartlett Road. Other than a Presbyterian Church, and a local gas station, nearly every structure along Route 83 is residential. The last moderate intersection is with CR 183B(Main Street) which runs southeast to County Road 10A. North of Glendale, SR 83 becomes surrounded by an increase in forestland and a decrease in farmland, and later encounters its only other major intersection, specifically State Road 2, which has another blinker-light intersection. The road straightens out again, and encounters just two local intersections until it reaches Gaskin, where the last intersection of any importance is with CR 181. The last intersection in the state in general is with Phillips Drive, a dead end/dirt road off to the east side. The road ends at the Florida-Alabama State Line and becomes Alabama State Route 153.

== Major intersections ==
The entire route is in Walton County.

Location	mi	km	Destinations	Notes
	0.000	0.000	US 98 (SR 30) – Blue Mountain Beach, Santa Rosa Beach, Fort Walton Beach, Seaside, Grayton Beach, Seagrove Beach, Grayton Beach State Recreation Area, Eden State Gardens, Henderson Beach State Recreation Area, Topsail Hill State Preserve	
see US 331 (mile 0.000-25.908)
DeFuniak Springs	25.908	41.695	US 90 west / US 331 north (SR 10 west) – Crestview, Airport	north end of US 331 overlap; south end of US 90 / SR 10 overlap
DeFuniak Springs	26.211	42.183	US 90 east (Nelson Avenue / SR 10) – Ponce de Leon	north end of US 90 / SR 10 overlap
	30.866	49.674	CR 1883 north – Walton County Jail	
	32.297	51.977	CR 192 west	
	34.080	54.846	CR 185 north (Gum Creek Church Road) – Leonia, Geneva	
	34.842	56.073	CR 1084 west	
Glendale	36.131	58.147	CR 183B south	
	39.407	63.419	CR 2 – Darlington	
Gaskin	43.780	70.457	CR 181 – Darlington	
	45.327	72.947	SR 153 north – Samson	Alabama state line
1.000 mi = 1.609 km; 1.000 km = 0.621 mi: Concurrency terminus

== Related routes ==
=== County Road 83 ===
County Road 83
- Location: Santa Rosa Beach

West of the southern terminus of SR 83 is a de facto extension along Old Blue Mountain Road known as County Road 83. It begins in Blue Mountain Beach where it crosses CR 30A, and then heads north where it ends at US 98.

=== County Road 83A ===
County Road 83A
- Location: Freeport

County Road 83A is a suffixed alternate of SR 83 located in Freeport, however due to the realignment of US 331 and SR 83 between Freeport and Owl's Head, it no longer has contact with SR 83.
