= U.S. Route 331 =

Highway in the United States

U.S. Route 331

Route information
- Auxiliary route of US 31
- Maintained by FDOT and ALDOT
- Length: 149.830 mi (241.128 km)

Major junctions
- South end: US 98 / SR 30 / SR 83 at Santa Rosa Beach, FL
- I-10 in DeFuniak Springs, FL; US 90 in DeFuniak Springs, FL; US 84 in Opp, AL; US 29 in Brantley, AL
- North end: US 80 / US 82 / SR 6 / SR 8 / SR 9 / SR 21 at Montgomery, AL

Location
- Country: United States
- States: Florida, Alabama
- Counties: FL: Walton; AL: Covington, Crenshaw, Montgomery

Highway system
- United States Numbered Highway System; List; Special; Divided
- Alabama State Highway System; Interstate; US; State
- Florida State Highway System; Interstate; US; State; Former; Pre‑1945; Toll; Scenic
← SR 303	AL	→ I-359
← SR 329	FL	→ SR 331
← I-175	SR 187	→ SR 188

U.S. Route 331 is a spur of U.S. Route 31. It currently runs for 151 miles (243 km) from Montgomery, Alabama at U.S. Route 80 and U.S. Route 82 to Santa Rosa Beach, Florida east of Fort Walton Beach at U.S. Route 98. Unlike U.S. Route 131, U.S. Route 231, and U.S. Route 431, U.S. 331 never intersects with its "parent" route, U.S. Route 31; the two routes come within 4 miles (6.4 km) of each other in Montgomery.

== Route description ==
=== Florida ===
A US 331 shield used in Florida prior to 1993

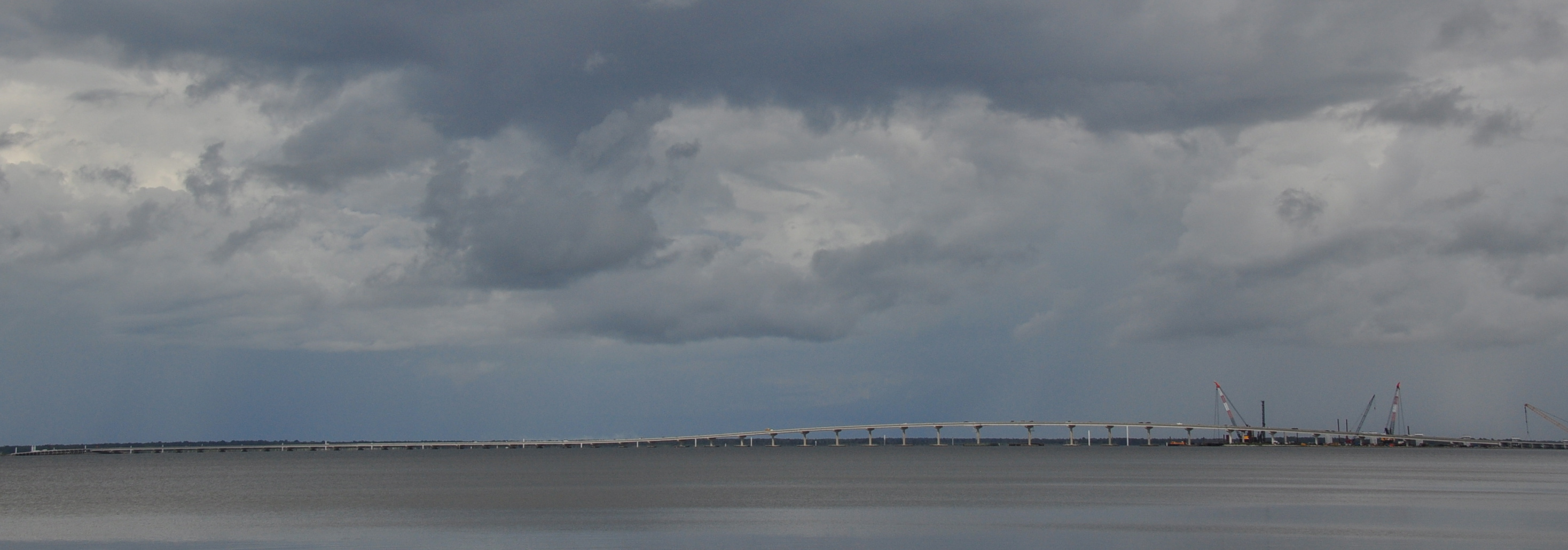
The Clyde B. Wells Bridge of U.S. Route 331 spans the eastern section of the Choctawhatchee Bay in Florida near its intersection with U.S. Route 98.

U.S. 331 begins at an intersection with U.S. Route 98 in Santa Rosa Beach in Walton County. It then crosses the Choctawhatchee Bay on the Clyde B. Wells Bridge, a 2.27 miles (3.65 km) long span, and enters the eastern side of Freeport. As it continues north, a spur route of U.S. 331 branches off and goes southwest back into town. The main route continues north for several miles before intersecting Interstate 10 and forming a concurrency with US 90 in DeFuniak Springs. The concurrency runs westward briefly until U.S. 331 branches off and continues to the northwest. It moves through a few small communities before passing through the town of Paxton and crossing into Covington County, Alabama. The entire route in Florida is in Walton County.

=== Alabama ===
Once crossing the state line, U.S. 331 immediately enters Florala, where it starts a concurrency with Alabama State Route 54 on the east side of town. The highway continues into downtown Florala, where Alabama State Route 55 joins the concurrency (this intersection serves as a terminus for AL-54).

U.S. 331 continues northward to Opp, where it becomes concurrent with U.S. 84 as a bypass around the eastern side of town. A business route of U.S. 331 continues northward through town and rejoins U.S. 331 north of Opp, just after U.S. 84 leaves the concurrency with U.S. 331. The highway then continues northward and enters Crenshaw County. It keeps north and into the town of Brantley, where U.S. 29 forms a concurrency with U.S. 331.

The highways continue north into Luverne, where U.S. 29 turns northeast and U.S. 331 turns northwest as they leave town. U.S. 331 soon turns back to the north and passes through several small communities before entering Montgomery County. It passes through several more small communities before entering the southern part of the city of Montgomery. It then intersects the southern bypass of the city (U.S. 80 and U.S. 82). This intersection serves as the northern terminus for U.S. 331.

== Major intersections ==
State	County	Location	mi	km	Destinations	Notes
Florida	Walton		0.000	0.000	US 98 (SR 30) – Blue Mountain Beach, Santa Rosa Beach, Fort Walton Beach, Seaside, Grayton Beach, Seagrove Beach, Grayton Beach State Recreation Area, Eden State Gardens, Henderson Beach State Recreation Area, Topsail Hill State Preserve	Southern terminus
Florida	Walton		2.110– 3.538	3.396– 5.694	Choctawhatchee Bay Bridge over Choctawhatchee Bay	
Florida	Walton		6.093	9.806	CR 3280 east	
Florida	Walton	Freeport	9.682	15.582	SR 20 to SR 293 (Mid-Bay Bridge) – Freeport, Bruce	
Florida	Walton	Freeport	14.014	22.553	CR 883 south – Freeport	former alignment of US 331 / SR 83
Florida	Walton		22.208	35.740	Coy Burgess Loop (County Road 278)	
Florida	Walton	DeFuniak Springs	23.570	37.932	CR 278 (Coy Burgess Loop Road)	
Florida	Walton	DeFuniak Springs	23.84	38.37	I-10 (SR 8) – Pensacola, Tallahassee	Exit 85 (I-10)
Florida	Walton	DeFuniak Springs	24.784	39.886	CR 280 west (Bob Sikes Road)	
Florida	Walton	DeFuniak Springs	25.908	41.695	US 90 east (Nelson Avenue / SR 10 east / SR 83 north) – Ponce de Leon	north end of SR 83 overlap; south end of US 90 / SR 10 overlap
Florida	Walton	DeFuniak Springs	27.791	44.725	US 90 west (SR 10) – Crestview	North end of US 90 / SR 10 overlap; south end of SR 187 overlap
Florida	Walton		34.210	55.056	CR 192 east	
Florida	Walton	Liberty	35.519	57.162	CR 1084 east	
Florida	Walton		38.270	61.590	CR 2 east	
Florida	Walton		38.416	61.825	CR 2A west	
Florida	Walton	Gordon	41.718	67.139	CR 2 west	
Florida	Walton		45.559	73.320	CR 0605 south	
Florida	Walton		45.757	73.639	CR 285 north	This is the only road to Britton hill which is Florida's highest point
Florida	Walton	Paxton	47.605	76.613	CR 147 (Webster Lane / Lakewood-Paxton Cutoff Road) – Lakewood	
			49.356 0.000	79.431 0.000	Florida–Alabama state line Northern terminus of SR 187, southern terminus of SR 9	
Alabama	Covington	Florala	0.370	0.595	SR 54 east (5th Avenue) – Samson, Geneva	
Alabama	Covington	Florala	1.526	2.456	SR 55 south (3rd Street) to SR 85 – Crestview, Fort Walton Beach	South end of SR 55 overlap
Alabama	Covington	Florala	1.750	2.816	SR 55 north (5th Avenue) – Andalusia	North end of SR 55 overlap
Alabama	Covington	Opp	19.451	31.303	US 84 west (SR 12 west / Veterans Memorial Parkway) – Andalusia	South end of US 84 / SR 12 overlap
Alabama	Covington	Opp	21.838	35.145	SR 52 east – Kinston	
Alabama	Covington	Opp	23.208	37.350	SR 134 east – Enterprise	
Alabama	Covington	Opp	25.000	40.234	US 84 east (SR 12 east) – Elba	South end of US 84 / SR 12 overlap
Alabama	Crenshaw		40.342	64.924	SR 141 south (Pine Level Road) – Elba	
Alabama	Crenshaw		42.879	69.007	SR 189 south (Elba Highway) – Elba	
Alabama	Crenshaw	Brantley	44.528	71.661	US 29 south (SR 15 south / West Emmett Avenue) – Andalusia	South end of US 29 / SR 15 overlap
Alabama	Crenshaw	Luverne	53.968	86.853	US 29 north / SR 10 east (SR 15 north / East 3rd Street) – Troy	North end of US 29 / SR 15 overlap, south end of SR 10 overlap
Alabama	Crenshaw	Luverne	55.762	89.740	SR 10 west – Rutledge, Greenville	North end of SR 10 overlap
Alabama	Crenshaw	Highland Home	73.173	117.761	SR 97 north (Davenport Highway) – Davenport	
Alabama	Montgomery	Ada	84.294	135.658	SR 94 east – Ramer	
Alabama	Montgomery	Montgomery	100.474	161.697	US 80 / US 82 / SR 21 (SR 6 / SR 8 / SR 9 north / South Boulevard) to I-65 / I-85 / US 231 – Selma, Tuscaloosa, Tuskegee, Union Springs	Northern terminus, access to Montgomery Regional Airport
1.000 mi = 1.609 km; 1.000 km = 0.621 mi: Concurrency terminus
