= Eglin Air Force Base Railroad =

Military railroad in Florida, U.S.

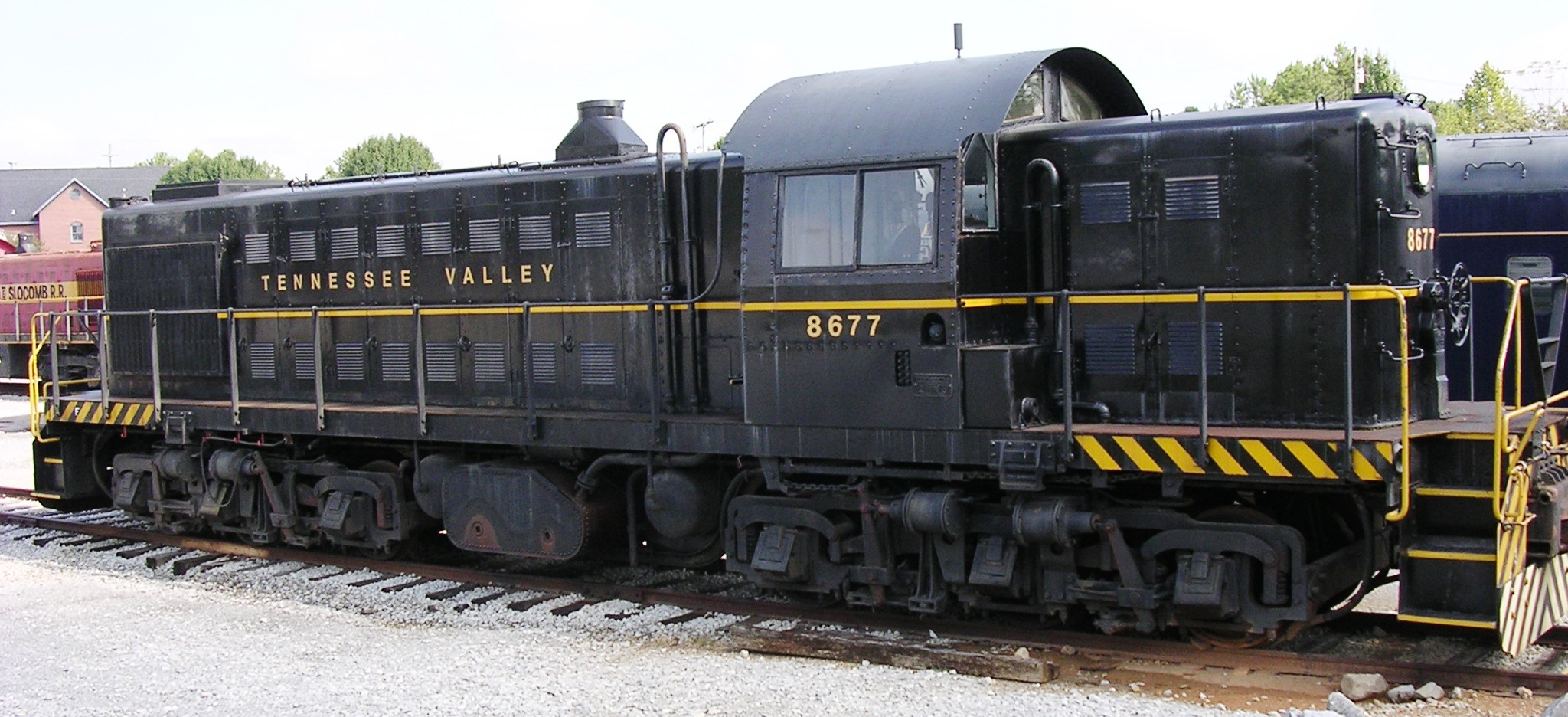
- One of the U.S. Army ALCO RSD-1 locomotives originally assigned to Eglin Air Force Base, now preserved at the Tennessee Valley Railroad Museum

Overview
- Headquarters: Eglin Air Force Base
- Locale: Florida
- Dates of operation: 1951–1970s

Technical
- Track gauge: 4 ft 8 1/2 in (1,435 mm) standard gauge
- Length: 45-mile (72 km)

The Eglin Air Force Base Railroad was a 45-mile (72 km) military railroad at Eglin Air Force Base (AFB) in Florida. It was created in 1951, and was operational until the late 1970s.

== History ==
Col. George P. Kendrick, chief of installations of the Air Proving command, announced on 11 August 1949, that negotiations were underway between the U.S. Air Force and the chief of the U. S. engineers relative to salvaging railroad materials at Camp Claiborne and Camp Polk, Louisiana, the Playground News, Fort Walton, Florida, reported on 18 August 1949. Kendrick stated that Third Army headquarters had indicated that the 44th Engineers Construction battalion, now in training at Fort Bragg, North Carolina, would do the work on moving the railroad materials to the new location. Although no official date had been set, an unofficial report gave 15 November as an approximate arrival date for the engineer battalion.

The Eglin Air Force Base (AFB) railroad was first constructed from an interchange with the Louisville and Nashville Railroad (L&N) at Mossy Head, Florida, down to the main base complex, with spurs to Auxiliary Fields 1 and 2, the ammunition dump, and other parts of the military reservation, with a total of 45 miles (72 km) of track. It was constructed with materials salvaged from the Claiborne and Polk Railroad, a 43-mile (69 km) line between the two camps, abandoned in 1945. The line, nicknamed the "B & F" (for back and forth), began operation on 1 February 1952 as part of the transportation division, Air Proving Ground Command, and utilised two ALCO RSD-1 military diesel-electric locomotives for road work and one 80-ton General Electric centercab for switching the yard. Its first yard manager was Shelby White. In 1955, the locomotive mechanic was Roy Parker of the 3201 VRS Squadron.

Part of the main base track and spur to the ammunition dump was realigned in 1956 with the construction of the 12,000-foot-long (3,700 m) runway 32/14 and the Strategic Air Command dispersal area.

Initial construction of a railroad line into the region had been discussed as early as 1927 as part of the Choctawhatchee and Northern Railroad, though military-use proposals did not come forward until 1941. German POWs were used in clearing and grading the alignment during World War II. There was one commercial customer served by the line, a lumber pulp yard at Niceville which is now community athletic fields. The line was later abandoned in the late 1970s and the southern end, west of State Road 285, pulled up by the mid-1980s. Much of the trackage remains in place from the former L&N (now CSX) interchange to just south of Bob Sikes Road, about 11 miles (18 km) long, albeit overgrown. Building 538, formerly the two-track, four-engine capacity engine house, serves as the vehicle maintenance corrosion control shop in 2009. Two of its four oversize doors have been walled closed. The (by then) four RSD-1 diesels were donated to the Tennessee Valley Railroad Museum.

== Motive power ==
=== Steam ===
One book on Florida railroad history has reported that steam was operated on the neophyte base railroad, but no local accounts support this. Photos have surfaced that verify that a 2-8-0 locomotive named the Eglin Queen was used in the 1950s, but had been retired by December 1959 and stored on the wye at the L&N interchange. The Eglin Queen's full history and identity remain unknown, as it was unnumbered, but both Chesapeake and Ohio (C&O) and Baltimore and Ohio (B&O) lettering was reportedly identified beneath the paint on opposite sides of its tender. Throughout the 1960s, the Eglin Queen was used as a target by various aircraft in test flights, and the January 1972 issue of Trains magazine later revealed the damage the 2-8-0 sustained.

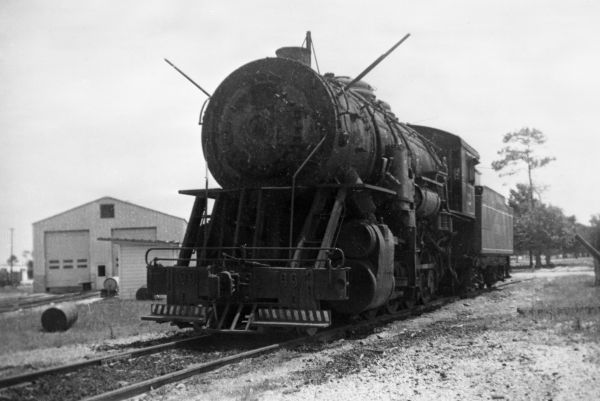
LS&I No. 32, a Baldwin 2-8-0, used in 1967 as a target at the Eglin AFB. The two antennas sticking out of the smokebox were part of the "remote control guidance system" the locomotive was modified with.

Another 2-8-0 locomotive was acquired in 1966, Lake Superior and Ishpeming (LS&I) SC-1 class No. 32. No. 32, which was built by Baldwin in 1916, had been among eleven LS&I 2-8-0s acquired by the Marquette and Huron Mountain tourist railroad, but since the SC-1s were found to be too heavy to operate on their line, they were gradually sold off. In 1967, amidst the testing of numerous Convair B-58 Hustler bomber jets at Eglin, No. 32 was expended in a test of air-to-ground missiles at the Eglin field, conducted on the rail spur into Aux. Fld 2, Pierce Field. Two articles—one carried by United Press International, dated 23 March 1967; and the other carried by Trains in August 1967—explain that the locomotive was modified with an electronic governor, a speed indicator, and a "remote control guidance system" to activate its throttle, brakes, reverse gear, and whistle, and it was operated over 2.5 miles (4.0 km) of trackage, controlled from a tower 1 mile (1.6 km) from the rail line, and served as a target for a new weapons system being tested. Neither article indicate whether or whenever the target locomotive was struck. A similar item dated 22 March 1967 carried by the Associated Press stated that the control system was designed by Leon Caver, task engineer for the project, and that the 50-year old locomotive had been reactivated to perfect railway bombing techniques against North Vietnam.

=== Diesel ===
A GE 80-ton B-B trucked switcher, number 1669, builder number 31376, built November 1952, formerly U.S. Army Transportation Corps 1669, at the Ogden, Utah arsenal, served at Eglin AFB, and later passed to Carswell AFB, Texas, by January 1979, and Fairchild AFB, Washington, thence to the U.S. Navy as 65–00639, at Bremerton, Washington, before being sold to American Silicon Technology, then to Silicon Metaltech.

One ALCO RSD-1 C-C trucked diesel locomotive that is documented to have been in use at Eglin AFB in 1955 was 8033, builder number 70654, order number S-1898 of 1942, delivered 1942, built for the U.S. Army Transportation Corps and operated on the Trans-Iranian Railway during World War II. No longer at Eglin by 1972, it went to Uruguay for the Uruguayan Railways (AFE) in 1977, where it was renumbered 601. It operated as a yard engine until about 1981 and was scrapped in 1988.

Four ALCO RSD-1 C-C trucked diesel locomotives were utilized at Eglin throughout the 1970s until the line was abandoned in 1978.

- 8014 - Builder number 70635, order number S-1898 of 1942, delivered November 1942, built for the U.S. Army Transportation Corps and operated on the Trans-Iranian Railway during World War II. Extant at the Tennessee Valley Railroad Museum.
- 8662 - Builder number 72155, order number S-1952 of 1944, delivered March 1945, built for use in Europe, returned to the U.S. in 1946. To the Tennessee Valley Railroad Museum. Parted out and scrapped by 1988.
- 8669 - Builder number 72162, order number S-1952 of 1944, delivered March 1945, built for use in Europe, returned to the U.S. in 1946. Extant at the Tennessee Valley Railroad Museum.
- 8677 - Builder number 72170, order number S-1952 of 1944, delivered March 1945, built for use in Europe, returned to the U.S. in 1946. Extant at the Tennessee Valley Railroad Museum.

Other equipment identified as operated at Eglin includes the following:

- Ohio Locomotive Crane Company Model EFA 25-Ton Capacity diesel crane, constructor number 4680, shipped 12 June 1952.
