= Portland, Florida =

Portland
- Community
- Interactive map of Portland
- Coordinates: 30°30′44.64″N 86°11′44.88″W
- Country: United States
- State: Florida
- County: Walton
- ZIP code: 32439
- Area code: 850

Portland is an unincorporated community located west of Freeport, Florida and east of Basin Bayou and the former settlement of Pensarosa.

The Portland Community Center is commonly used as a voting location for Precinct 420 of Walton County.
