= Choctawhatchee and Northern Railroad =

Choctawhatchee & Northern Railroad
Overview
- Headquarters: Shalimar, Florida
- Locale: Florida Panhandle
- Dates of operation: February 1927–July 1931

Technical
- Track gauge: 4 ft 8 1/2 in (1,435 mm) standard gauge
- Length: 28 mi (45 km) (Planned)

The Choctawhatchee and Northern Railroad was one of many proposed railroad projects that never made it beyond the planning stage, this one in the Florida Panhandle. Chartered in February 1927 "To construct, acquire, maintain, lease, or operate a line of railroad or railroads from a point between Galliver and Crestview on the Louisville and Nashville Railroad in Okaloosa County, to a point in said county on Choctawhatchee Bay, a distance of approximately 28 mi (45 km)," the line was envisioned as part of a Port Dixie (now Shalimar, Florida) development plan.

== History ==
On Garnier's Bayou near the present Eglin Air Force Base housing development in Shalimar, a $29,000,000 Port Dixie Harbor and Terminal Company was chartered to build wharves for liners, a rail line north, and a city of one square mile, with streets 100 feet wide. These ambitious plans would not see fruition and no rail was ever laid on this project.

Use as a deep water port was contingent upon the U.S. Army Corps of Engineers dredging East Pass at Destin, the only outlet to the Gulf of Mexico for the Choctawhatchee Bay, and despite claims by the optimistic developers that the ocean liner SS Normandie could be berthed without dredging, the Corps determined that the required work to deepen East Pass for deep-water vessels was not feasible. "It is not known for certain whether capital for the railroad was contingent upon a positive report by the Corps of Engineers on the pass proposal or whether the company was simple [sic] unable to finance the railroad. In any case, the project died, died with no obituary, no post-mortem." The peak of local interest came in May and June 1931, when optimistic accounts in the local press reported that in mid-May, M. C. Miller, secretary-treasurer of the "Port Dixie Railroad Line" "revealed that the prospects for an early start on the enterprise were very promising". This positive view was based upon receipt of a letter from J. M. Hodgskins, president, from Philadelphia, Pennsylvania, stating that necessary groundwork was running ahead of schedule. Details were announced by Hodgskins at a mass meeting attended by some 1,500 in Camp Walton, Florida, as he outlined the grandiose plans including a realty company, railroad, port facilities, shipbuilding plant, steamship lines, a rubber tire plant, a nightclub and townsite. The excitement lasted through the July 3, 1931, publication of an article in the Okaloosa News-Journal, Crestview, Florida, stating that the port plans had been perfected. After that, the Corps of Engineers' refusal to dredge doomed the project.

The United States Air Force would later construct a rail line from an interchange with the L&N at Mossy Head, Florida, to the main base of Eglin Air Force Base, just north of the envisioned Port Dixie terminus of the Choctawhatchee and Northern. This line opened in late 1951 and operated until about 1980 before being abandoned and partially lifted.

== See also ==
- List of United States railroads
  - List of defunct Florida railroads
- Eglin Air Force Base Railroad
