= 3280 =

3280 may refer to:

- A.D. 3280, a year in the 4th millennium CE
- 3280 BC, a year in the 4th millennium BCE
- 3280, a number in the 3000 (number) range

== Roads numbered 3280 ==
- Louisiana Highway 3280, a state highway
- Texas Farm to Market Road 3280, a state highway
- County Road 3280 (Walton County, Florida)

== Other uses ==
- 3280 Grétry, an asteroid in the Asteroid Belt, the 3280th asteroid registered

== See also ==
- USS Ohioan (ID-3280), a WWI U.S. Navy cargo ship
