= Grayton Beach =

Grayton Beach may refer to:

- Grayton Beach, Florida, town in Florida
- Grayton Beach State Park, state park in Florida
