= Lake Lorraine, Florida =

- CDP
- Location in Okaloosa County and the state of Florida
- Coordinates: 30°26′27″N 86°33′56″W
- Country: United States
- State: Florida
- County: Okaloosa

Area
  - Total: 2.29 sq mi (5.93 km^{2})
  - Land: 2.06 sq mi (5.33 km^{2})
  - Water: 0.23 sq mi (0.60 km^{2})
- Elevation: 23 ft (7.0 m)

Population (2020)
  - Total: 7,142
  - Density: 3,470.2/sq mi (1,339.87/km^{2})
- Time zone: UTC-6 (Central (CST))
  - Summer (DST): UTC-5 (CDT)
- FIPS code: 12-38287
- GNIS feature ID: 2403196

Lake Lorraine is a census-designated place (CDP) in Okaloosa County, Florida, United States. The population was 7,142 at the 2020 census, up from 7,010 at the 2010 census. It is part of the Crestview–Fort Walton Beach–Destin, Florida Metropolitan Statistical Area. It carries a Shalimar postal address and zip code. Lake Lorraine was originally a fresh-water body, but at some point in the 1990s the narrow sandbar that separated it from the Choctawhatchee Bay was breached and the former drainage channel to the tip of Black's Point became blocked by silt.

== History ==
The residential neighborhood originally developed along circumferential Country Club Road, surrounding a golf course, in the 1970s. The recession of 1976 left a number of properties in the interior of the golf course U in an unfinished and abandoned state. These parcels were later reconstructed. Further growth took place in the 1990s and 2000s, when the formerly wooded Black's Point area was developed with streets bearing the names of famous golfers. A "backdoor" gate onto Eglin Air Force Base, adjacent to base housing, accessed by Davis Court off of the northeast corner of Country Club Road, was closed amidst tightened base security and concerns about traffic routing through residential neighborhoods in the mid-1970s.

During World War II, adjacent Eglin Field anchored a battleship-size target float in the Choctawhatchee Bay, just south of Black's Point, the southernmost point of the Lake Lorraine area, an area designated during the war as Eglin water range 60.

== Geography ==
According to the United States Census Bureau, the CDP has a total area of 2.4 square miles (6.2 km^{2}), of which 2.0 square miles (5.2 km^{2}) is land and 0.3 square miles (0.78 km^{2}) (13.56%) is water.

== Demographics ==
Historical population
Census	Pop.	Note	%±
1990	6,779		—
2000	7,106		4.8%
2010	7,010		−1.4%
2020	7,142		1.9%
U.S. Decennial Census

=== 2020 census ===
As of the 2020 census, Lake Lorraine had a population of 7,142. The median age was 41.5 years. 19.8% of residents were under the age of 18 and 20.8% of residents were 65 years of age or older. For every 100 females there were 98.7 males, and for every 100 females age 18 and over there were 98.3 males age 18 and over.

99.8% of residents lived in urban areas, while 0.2% lived in rural areas.

There were 3,048 households in Lake Lorraine, of which 24.6% had children under the age of 18 living in them. Of all households, 48.2% were married-couple households, 20.4% were households with a male householder and no spouse or partner present, and 25.6% were households with a female householder and no spouse or partner present. About 28.1% of all households were made up of individuals and 11.5% had someone living alone who was 65 years of age or older.

There were 3,281 housing units, of which 7.1% were vacant. The homeowner vacancy rate was 2.1% and the rental vacancy rate was 7.7%.

Racial composition as of the 2020 census
Race	Number	Percent
White	5,166	72.3%
Black or African American	617	8.6%
American Indian and Alaska Native	35	0.5%
Asian	314	4.4%
Native Hawaiian and Other Pacific Islander	30	0.4%
Some other race	212	3.0%
Two or more races	768	10.8%
Hispanic or Latino (of any race)	753	10.5%

=== 2000 census ===
As of the 2000 census, there were 7,106 people residing in the CDP. The population density was 3,483.2 inhabitants per square mile (1,344.9/km^{2}). There were 3,149 housing units at an average density of 1,543.6 per square mile (596.0/km^{2}). The racial makeup of the CDP was 82.70% White, 8.53% African American, 0.41% Native American, 3.22% Asian, 0.15% Pacific Islander, 1.86% from other races, and 3.12% from two or more races. Hispanic or Latino of any race were 5.39% of the population.

There were 2,937 households, out of which 30.1% had children under the age of 18 living with them, 54.9% were married couples living together, 10.8% had a female householder with no husband present, and 30.9% were non-families. 23.8% of all households were made up of individuals, and 6.2% had someone living alone who was 65 years of age or older. The average household size was 2.42 and the average family size was 2.85.

In the CDP, the population was spread out, with 23.5% under the age of 18, 8.3% from 18 to 24, 28.9% from 25 to 44, 27.2% from 45 to 64, and 12.2% who were 65 years of age or older. The median age was 38 years. For every 100 females, there were 97.3 males. For every 100 females age 18 and over, there were 96.5 males.

The median income for a household in the CDP was $47,437, and the median income for a family was $54,613. Males had a median income of $32,483 versus $21,688 for females. The per capita income for the CDP was $22,695. About 4.7% of families and 6.5% of the population were below the poverty line, including 9.1% of those under age 18 and 6.1% of those age 65 or over.

== Notable person ==
- General Chuck Horner - Air commander during Desert Storm
