= County Road 183 =

County Road 183 or County Route 183 may refer to:

- County Road 183 (Walton County, Florida), formerly State Road 183
- County Road 183 (Pinellas County, Florida), along the Gulf of Mexico south of Clearwater Beach
- County Route 183 (Erie County, New York)
- County Route 183 (Herkimer County, New York)
- County Route 183 (Onondaga County, New York)
- County Route 183 (Sullivan County, New York)
