= Chuck Horner =

United States Air Force general

Charles A. Horner
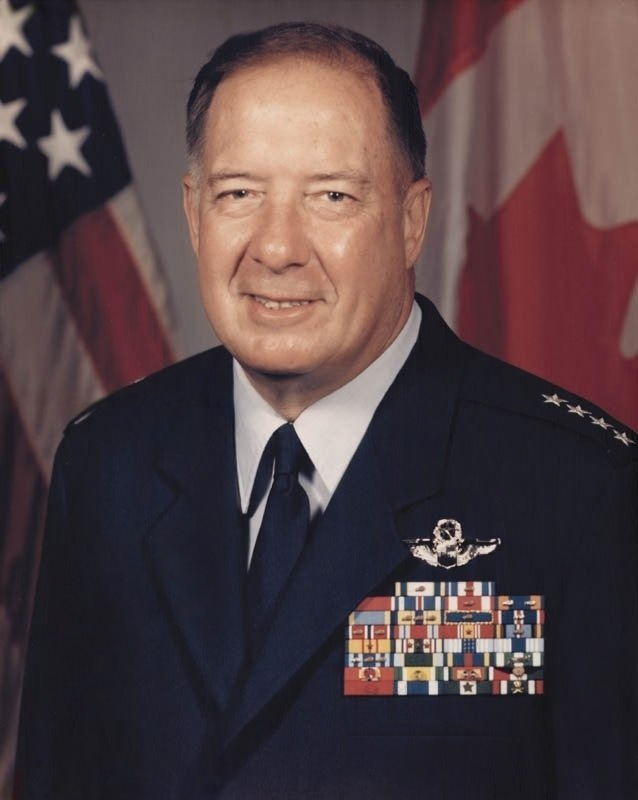
- General Charles A. Horner
- Born: October 19, 1936 (age 89); Davenport, Iowa, U.S.
- Military career
- Allegiance: United States
- Branch: United States Air Force
- Service years: 1958–1994
- Rank: General
- Nickname: Chuck
- Commands: Air Force Space Command; North American Aerospace Defense Command; United States Air Forces Central Command; 9th Air Force
- Conflicts: Vietnam War; Gulf War
- Awards: Air Force Distinguished Service Medal (3); Silver Star (2); Legion of Merit; Distinguished Flying Cross; Meritorious Service Medal (2); Air Medal (11); Aerial Achievement Medal; Air Force Commendation Medal (4)
- Other work: author

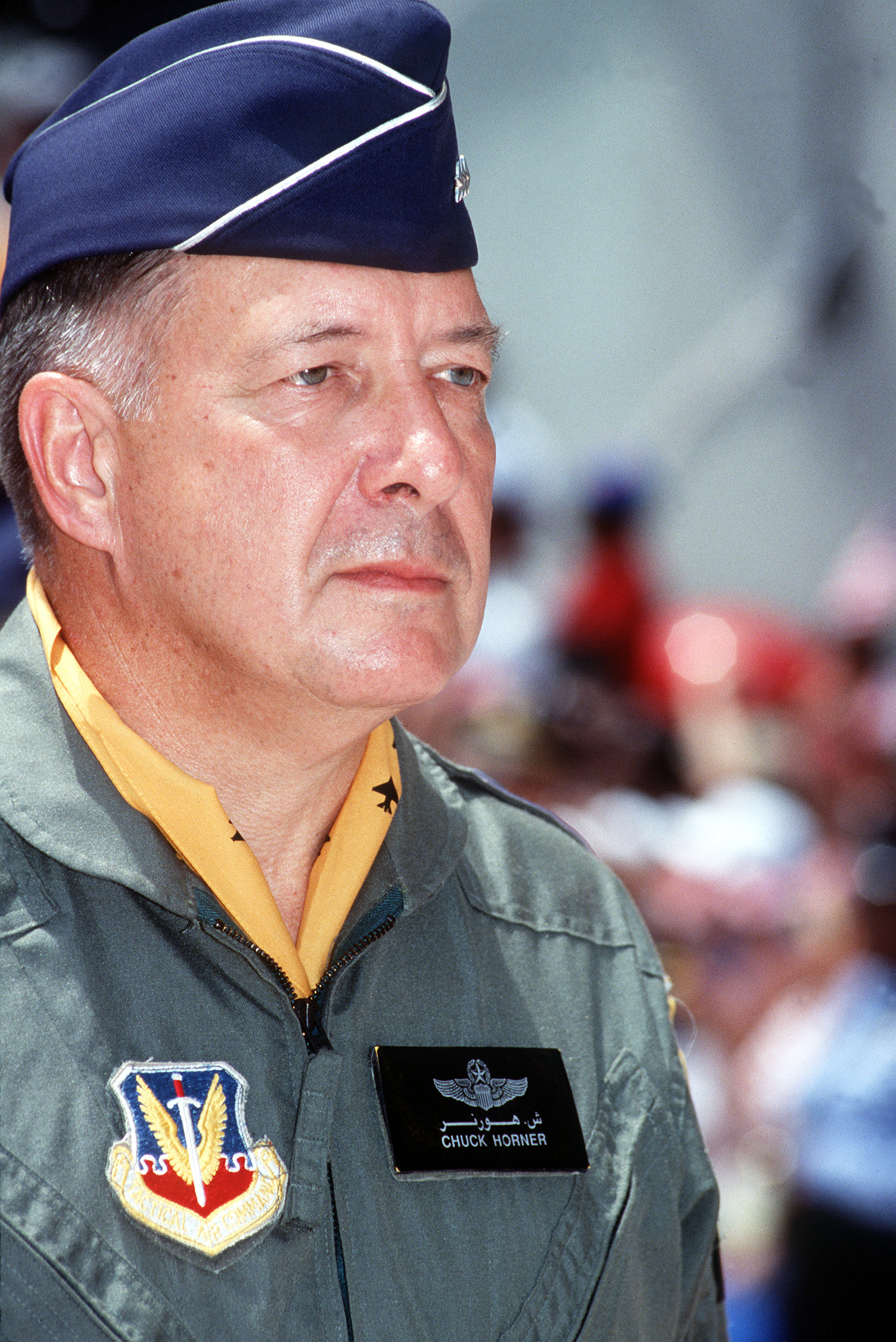
Lieutenant General Charles A. Horner in 1991

Charles Albert Horner (born October 19, 1936) is a retired United States Air Force four-star general. He was born in Davenport, Iowa and attended the University of Iowa, as part of the Air Force Reserve Officers' Training Corps program. On June 13, 1958, Horner was commissioned into the Air Force Reserve. During the Vietnam War, he flew in combat as a Wild Weasel pilot and received the Silver Star. During Operation Desert Shield and Operation Desert Storm, he commanded the air forces of the coalition, and he additionally briefly served as Commander-in-Chief — Forward of United States Central Command while General Norman Schwarzkopf, Jr., the commander of all coalition forces, was still in the United States. He currently serves on the board of directors for the United States Institute of Peace.

== Military career ==
Horner was born in Davenport, Iowa, on October 19, 1936. He entered the United States Air Force through the Reserve Officer Training Corps program. He was commissioned in the Air Force Reserve on June 13, 1958, just before his graduation from the University of Iowa and was awarded pilot wings in November 1959 and was resworn with a regular Air Force commission in 1962. He has commanded a tactical training wing, a fighter wing, two air divisions and a numbered Air Force. While Commander of 9th Air Force, he also commanded United States Central Command Air Forces, in command of all United States and allied air assets during operations Desert Shield and Desert Storm.

Horner is a command pilot with more than 5,300 flying hours in a variety of fighter aircraft. During the Vietnam War he flew 41 combat missions over North Vietnam in the F-105 Thunderchief during a tour. He later flew more than 70 combat missions as an F-105 Wild Weasel pilot, deliberately drawing anti-aircraft fire to identify and destroy North Vietnamese defenses.

After primary flight training at Lackland AFB, jet training at Laredo AFB, gunnery training at Williams AFB, top-off training and F-100D Super Sabre transition training at Nellis AFB, Horner's first operational assignment was in October 1960 with the 48th Fighter Wing at RAF Lakenheath. In 1963, Horner was reassigned to the 4th Tactical Fighter Wing and Seymour Johnson AFB, where he flew the F-105. From April through August 1965, Horner was assigned as an F-105 pilot at Korat AB in Thailand, flying missions over North Vietnam. From August 1965 to 1967, Horner returned to Nellis AFB as an F-105 instructor, becoming involved in a number of projects involving other aircraft and undergoing F-105 Wild Weasel training. In 1967, he returned to Korat AB, flying both Wild Weasel and night radar bombing missions.

Horner returned to Nellis AFB in August 1967 where, after initial assignment to the Combat Crew Training Wing, he ended up flying as an instructor at the Fighter Weapons School. In March 1968, he joined the new Fighter Weapons Center at Nellis. From 1970 to 1972 he was assigned as a staff officer to Tactical Air Command (TAC) headquarters at Langley AFB, followed by four months of post-graduate work at the College of William and Mary, where he earned his Master of Business Administration. This was followed by a three-year assignment at The Pentagon and subsequent assignment to the National War College at Fort Lesley J. McNair.

In January 1977, Horner participated in his first Red Flag exercise. His next assignment was to Luke AFB, as deputy commander of the 58th Fighter Wing. In 1980, he was reassigned to Nellis as wing commander of the 474th Tactical Fighter Wing, which was equipped with F-4D Phantoms but scheduled to transition to F-16 Fighting Falcons. TAC Commander General Wilbur L. Creech kept moving Horner; who commanded at four different bases, two air divisions, the Air Defense Weapons Center, and finally Ninth Air Force.

Horner was Commander in Chief of North American Aerospace Defense Command and the United States Space Command; and Commander of Air Force Space Command, Peterson Air Force Base, Colorado from 1992 to 1994. He was responsible for the aerospace defense of the United States and Canada, and the exploitation and control of space for national purposes through a network of satellites and ground stations around the world.

== Other work ==
External videos
- Presentation by Horner and Clancy to the National Press Club on Every Man a Tiger, May 18, 1999, C-SPAN

Horner co-wrote Every Man a Tiger with Tom Clancy. In 2004, Horner served on a Pentagon team that looked into detainee abuse.

The United States Air Force awards a General Charles A. Horner "Tiger Award" to one officer and one enlisted individual assigned to the Fourteenth Air Force annually (.pdf). He currently resides in Lake Lorraine, Florida.

Horner is on the Honorary Capital Campaign Committee for the National Desert Storm War Memorial Association. They are committed to build The National Desert Storm and Desert Shield Memorial at 23rd Streets and Constitution Avenue, N.W. in Washington, D.C. by 2021. This will be the 30th Anniversary of Operation Desert Storm.

== Education ==
- 1958 Bachelor of Arts degree, University of Iowa, Iowa City
- 1967 Squadron Officer School, Maxwell AFB, Alabama
- 1972 Master of Business Administration degree, College of William and Mary, Williamsburg, Virginia
- 1972 Armed Forces Staff College, Norfolk, Virginia
- 1974 Industrial College of the Armed Forces, Fort Lesley J. McNair, Washington, D.C.
- 1976 National War College, Fort Lesley J. McNair, Washington, D.C.

== Assignments ==
- October 1958 – June 1959, student, officer preflight training, Spence AFB, Georgia
- June 1959 – October 1960, student, pilot training, Laredo AFB, Texas
- October — November 1960, student, F-100 combat crew training, Luke AFB, Arizona, and Nellis AFB, Nevada
- November 1960 – December 1963, F-100 pilot, 492d Tactical Fighter Squadron, Royal Air Force Station Lakenheath, England
- December 1963 – December 1965, F-105 pilot, 4th Tactical Fighter Wing, Seymour Johnson AFB, North Carolina
- June 1965 – December 1965, temporary duty as F-105 pilot, 388th Tactical Fighter Wing, Korat Royal Thai AFB, Thailand
- December 1965 – May 1967, F-105 instructor pilot, Nellis AFB, Nevada
- May 1967 – September 1967, F-105 Wild Weasel pilot, Korat Royal Thai AFB, Thailand
- September 1967 – October 1969, F-105 instructor pilot, Nellis AFB, Nevada, then liaison officer, Air Force Tactical Fighter Weapons Center, Nellis AFB, Nevada
- October 1969 – January 1971, air operations staff officer, Office of the Deputy Chief of Staff for Plans, Headquarters Tactical Air Command, Langley AFB, Virginia
- January 1971 – January 1972, student, Armed Forces Staff College, Norfolk, Virginia
- January 1972 – August 1975, air operations officer, later, Chief of the Force Branch in the Office of the Deputy Chief of Staff for Operations, Headquarters U.S. Air Force, Washington, D.C.
- August 1975 – June 1976, student, National War College, Fort Lesley J. McNair, Washington, D.C.
- June 1976 – March 1979, Deputy Commander for Operations, 4th Tactical Fighter Wing, Seymour Johnson AFB, N.C.
- March 1979 – August 1979, Vice Commander, 58th Tactical Training Wing, Luke AFB, Arizona
- August 1979 – May 1980, Commander, 405th Tactical Training Wing, Luke Air Force Base, Arizona
- May 1980 – August 1981, Commander, 474th Tactical Fighter Wing, Nellis AFB, Nevada
- August 1981 – May 1983, Commander, 833d Air Division, Holloman AFB, New Mexico
- May 1983 – October 1983, Commander, 23d North American Aerospace Defense Command Region, and Tactical Air Command Air Division, Tyndall AFB, Florida
- October 1983 – May 1985, Commander, Air Force Air Defense Weapons Center, Tyndall AFB, Florida
- May 1985 – March 1987, Deputy Chief of Staff for Plans, Headquarters Tactical Air Command, Langley AFB, Virginia
- March 1987 – June 1992, Commander, Ninth Air Force, and Commander, U.S. Central Command Air Forces, Shaw AFB, South Carolina. He commanded U.S. and allied air operations for Operation Desert Shield and Desert Storm in Saudi Arabia from August 1990 until his return to Shaw AFB in April 1991.
- June 1992 – September 1994, Commander in Chief, North American Aerospace Defense Command and U.S. Space Command; Commander, Air Force Space Command, Peterson AFB, Colorado
- September 30, 1994, Retired from active duty.

== Flight information ==
- Rating: Command pilot
- Flight hours: More than 5,300
- Aircraft flown: F-100, F-105, F-4, F-15, F-16
- Pilot wings from: Laredo Air Force Base, Texas

== Awards and decorations ==
U.S. Air Force Command Pilot Badge
Basic Space and Missile Operations Badge

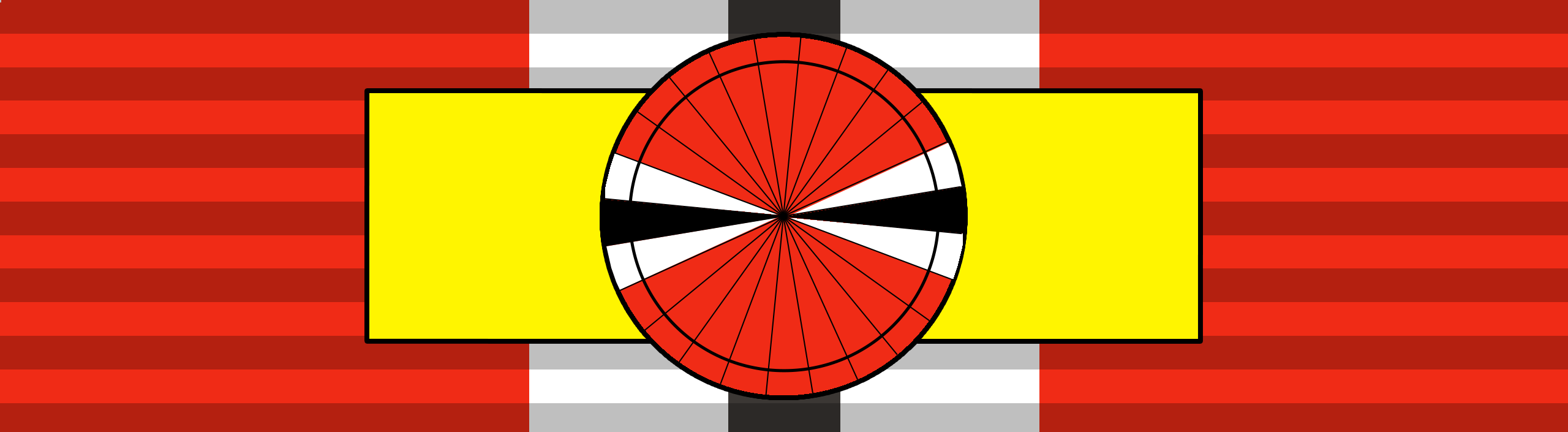
Air Force Distinguished Service Medal with two bronze oak leaf clusters
Silver Star with oak leaf cluster
Legion of Merit
Distinguished Flying Cross
Meritorious Service Medal with oak leaf cluster
Air Medal with ten oak leaf clusters
Aerial Achievement Medal
Air Force Commendation Medal with three oak leaf clusters
Air Force Presidential Unit Citation with oak leaf cluster
Air Force Outstanding Unit Award with silver oak leaf cluster
Air Force Organizational Excellence Award with two oak leaf clusters
Combat Readiness Medal
National Defense Service Medal with one bronze service star
Armed Forces Expeditionary Medal with two service stars
Vietnam Service Medal with service star
Southwest Asia Service Medal with three service stars
Air Force Overseas Short Tour Service Ribbon
Air Force Overseas Long Tour Service Ribbon
Air Force Longevity Service Award with one silver and three bronze oak leaf clusters
Small Arms Expert Marksmanship Ribbon
Air Force Training Ribbon
Khalifiyyeh Order of Bahrain, Grand Cross
King Faisal Order, Officer
United Arab Emirates Military Merit Order, Grand Cross
Legion of Honour, Officer (France)
Meritorious Service Cross, Military Division (Canada)
Medal of Merit (Nicaragua) with bronze star
Vietnam Campaign Medal
Kuwait Liberation Medal (Saudi Arabia)
Kuwait Liberation Medal (Kuwait)

== Other achievements ==
- 1991 U.S. News Trophy
- 1991 History of Aviation Award
- 1991 Maxwell A. Kriendler Memorial Award
- 1991 Aviation Achievement Award
- 1991 Air Force Order of the Sword
- 1991 Aviation Week and Space Technology's Aerospace Laureate
- 1992 National Veteran's Award

== Promotion dates ==
- Second Lieutenant June 13, 1958
- First Lieutenant June 12, 1960
- Captain October 1, 1963
- Major June 1, 1969
- Lieutenant Colonel November 1, 1973
- Colonel February 1, 1975
- Brigadier General August 1, 1982
- Major General July 1, 1985
- Lieutenant General May 1, 1987
- General July 1, 1992
