= Florida State Road 285 =

State highway in Florida, United States

State Road 285

Route information
- Maintained by FDOT
- Length: 17.864 mi (28.749 km)

Major junctions
- South end: SR 20 in Niceville
- I-10 in Mossy Head
- North end: US 90 near Mossy Head

Location
- Country: United States
- State: Florida
- Counties: Okaloosa, Walton

Highway system
- Florida State Highway System; Interstate; US; State; Former; Pre‑1945; Toll; Scenic
← SR 281	→ SR 289

State Road 285 (SR 285) is a north–south state road in Florida’s western panhandle.

== Route description ==
SR 285's south end is at SR 20 in downtown Niceville. From there, it head northwest through town as Partin Drive. After several blocks, it crosses Swift Creek, heading out of Niceville. After that, it quickly crosses College Boulevard, and into Eglin Air Force Base, where it stays for most of its journey. It slowly turns more toward the north until it passes Pierce Field, a closed auxiliary field. Then, it turns back to its northwest pattern, heading towards Ramer Lookout Tower. After a few miles, it crosses the county border from Okaloosa into Walton. It intersects with Range Road 213 and Bob Sikes Road, then heads northward, hugging the border. Once it crosses Titi Creek, it leans northwest again, running alongside the Florida Trail. After a couple miles, it crosses over, interchanging with Interstate 10 at exit 70. Then, it abruptly ends at the northern border of the base, which is guided by U.S. Route 90.

== Major intersections ==
County	Location	mi	km	Destinations	Notes
Okaloosa	Niceville	0.000	0.000	SR 20 (John Sims Parkway) – Freeport, Valparaiso, Fort Walton Beach, Northwest Florida Regional Airport, Eglin AFB, Hurlburt Field	
Okaloosa	Niceville	1.789	2.879	College Boulevard (CR 190 west) - Northwest Florida State College	
Okaloosa	Eglin AFB	2.3	3.7	SR 293 (Mid-Bay Bridge) – Destin	interchange
Walton	Eglin AFB	11.695	18.821	Bob Sikes Road - Test Areas	To CR 280
Walton	Eglin AFB	17.53	28.21	I-10 (SR 8) – Pensacola, Tallahassee	I-10 exit 70
Walton		17.864	28.749	US 90 (SR 10) – Crestview, DeFuniak Springs, Mossy Head	
1.000 mi = 1.609 km; 1.000 km = 0.621 mi
