= Florida State Road 293 =

State highway in Florida, United States

State Road 293
- SR 293 highlighted in red

Route information
- Maintained by FDOT
- Length: 15.4 mi (24.8 km)
- Existed: June 1993–present

Major junctions
- South end: US 98 in Destin
- SR 20 near Niceville
- North end: SR 85 in Niceville

Location
- Country: United States
- State: Florida
- Counties: Okaloosa

Highway system
- Florida State Highway System; Interstate; US; State; Former; Pre‑1945; Toll; Scenic
| ← SR 292 | → SR 294 |

State Road 293 (SR 293) is a 15.4 mile (24.8 km) major thoroughfare, extending from U.S. Route 98 in Destin, north across the Mid-Bay Bridge, a toll bridge, around Niceville to State Road 85. Initially ending at Florida State Road 20 west of where they intersect today, SR 293 has served as a very important bypass to the Niceville community, and as a hurricane evacuation route. From the Mid-Bay Bridge and to points north, the roadway is known as the Walter Francis Spence Parkway.

== Route description ==
State Road 293 begins at the intersection with Hutchinson Street and US 98 in Destin near many shopping centers. SR 293 continues north from here as a four-lane boulevard, named Danny Wuerffel Way. SR 293 turns slightly east as it passes by Turnberry Harbor and Destin Middle School. It then becomes a two-lane freeway and crosses the 3.6 mile long Mid-Bay Bridge over Choctawhatchee Bay, where at the northern end of the bridge, tolls are collected ($4.00 Cash, $3.00 SunPass). From here, SR 293 continues north, developing the name of the Walter Francis Spence Parkway as it sharply turns northeast at the Lakeshore Drive Interchange. It extends for another two miles as a four-lane freeway, traveling northward around the Bluewater Bay community and intersects Florida State Road 20 with a single point urban interchange. SR 293 has an interchange with Range Road, and continues north as a two-lane expressway. Still heading north, it crosses the Rocky Creek Bridge. It then passes the second tolling point: the electronic toll gantry ($2.00 Toll by plate / $1.50 SunPass). SR 293 then intersects an access road to a master-planned subdivision. It then turns to a direction of west-by-northwest and intersects with Forest Road and Florida State Road 285, before continuing west, crossing bridges over Swift Creek, Fox Head Branch, and Mill Creek to terminate at Florida State Road 85 at a Trumpet Interchange.

== History ==
The State Road was established in June 1993 when the Mid-Bay Bridge was opened. Originally, the northern terminus of the road was at the toll plaza at the northern end of the bridge. The northern approached was accessed via White Point Road. In 2011, the road was opened to SR 20.

State Road 293 was extended around the Niceville area in 3 stages, starting with an extension north to Range Road, completed in 2011. It was followed by extensions to SR 285, then SR 85 both completed in January 2014.. Proposals have been made to extend SR 293 to Florida State Road 123 and reconnect with US Route 98 and extend west to Florida State Road 87, but proposals for this further extension have been placed on indefinite hold due to environmental concerns.

== Summertime traffic concerns ==
The high demand for the Mid-Bay Bridge has caused many backups on SR 293 in both directions due to the high amount of cash users and the lower speed limit in the SunPass lane. Mostly throughout Florida, the speed limit in the SunPass lanes are 25 MPH, whereas this one is 15 MPH. Motorists attempted to use local roadways as alternative routes to the delay, but the high demand for access created additional congestion. As a remedy to this, the southbound entrance ramp from Lakeshore Drive was closed on select days from 12 PM to 6 PM. Also, variable-message signs were placed north of Florida State Road 20 in summer 2017 to inform drivers that the exits provide local access only and are not to be used as detours.

=== Toll-by-plate controversy ===
When the roadway first opened, the electronic tolling point east of Niceville was not adequately marked, and vacationers without a SunPass were confusing it with an error in the toll payment on the Mid-Bay Bridge. Many were receiving bills in the mail, along with a $2.50 administrative charge. Changes were not made to the signage until 2016.

== Major intersections ==
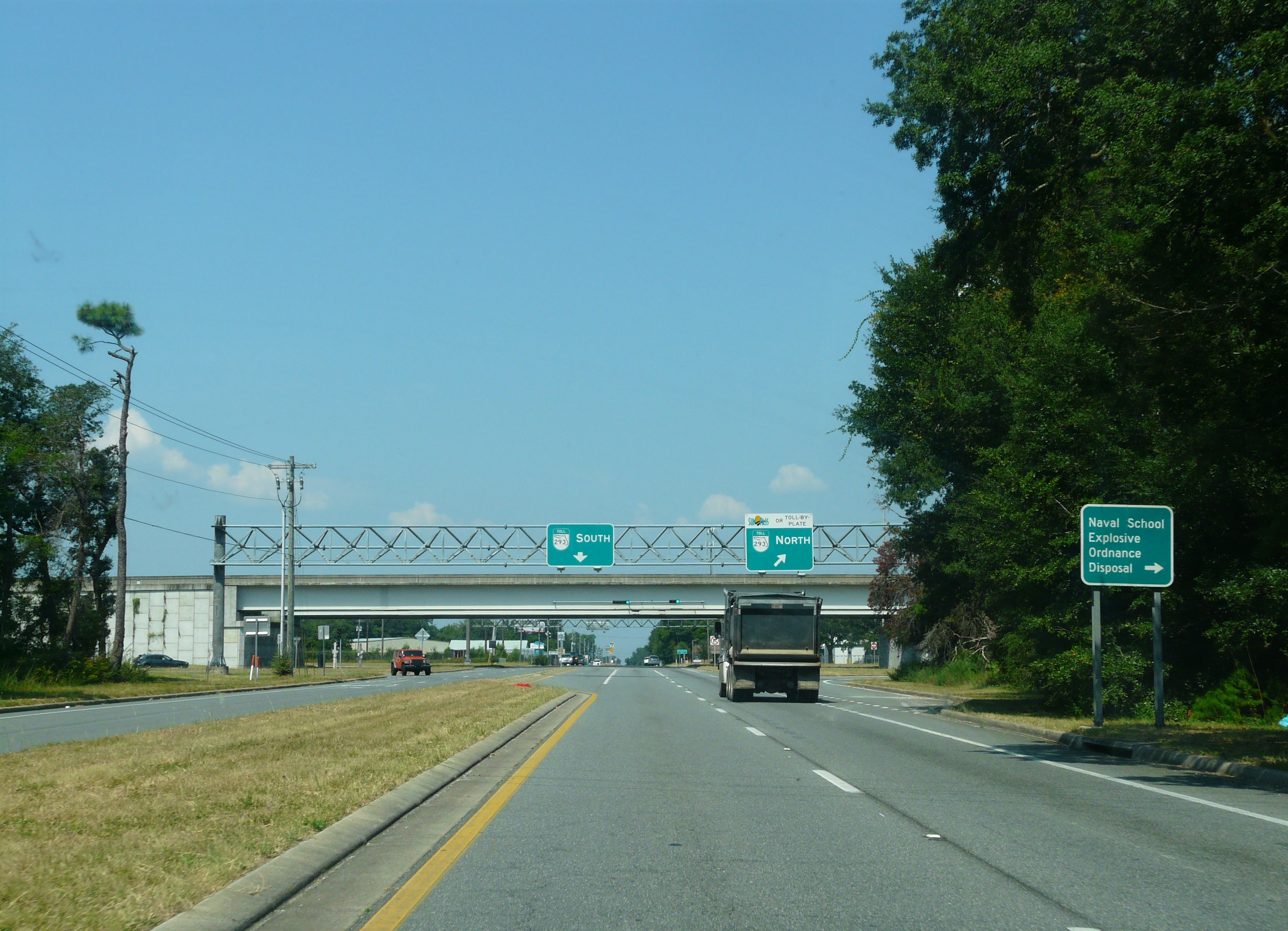
Florida State Road 20 at State Road 293

The entire route is in Okaloosa County.

| Location | mi | km | Destinations | Notes |
|---|---|---|---|---|
| Destin | 0.000 | 0.000 | US 98 – Panama City, Destin, Okaloosa Island, Henderson Beach State Park | US 98 is unsigned SR 30 |
| Destin | 0.982 | 1.580 | Southern end of limited-access section | |
| Destin | 0.982 | 1.580 | Legendary Marina Drive | |
| Choctawhatchee Bay | 0.982– 4.631 | 1.580– 7.453 | Mid-Bay Bridge (toll; cash or SunPass) | |
| | 5.43 | 8.74 | Lakeshore Drive – Maxwell Gunter Recreation Area | Southbound entrance ramp closed during peak tourist season hours |
| | 6.28 | 10.11 | SR 20 to I-10 – Niceville, Freeport, Tallahassee, Bunnell | Single point urban interchange |
| | 7.53 | 12.12 | Range Road | |
| | 9.8 | 15.8 | Spence Parkway Toll Gantry (SunPass or pay-by-plate) | |
| | 12.9 | 20.8 | SR 285 to I-10 east – Niceville, Mossy Head | |
| Niceville | 15.4 | 24.8 | SR 85 to I-10 – Crestview, Fort Walton Beach, Valparaiso, Destin, FWB Airport | Trumpet interchange; current northern terminus |
| | | | SR 123 | Proposed interchange (unfunded) |
| Hurlburt Field | | | US 98 (SR 30) | Proposed connection (unfunded) |
| Navarre | | | SR 87 | Proposed interchange (unfunded) |
1.000 mi = 1.609 km; 1.000 km = 0.621 mi: Tolled; Unopened

-
