= LaGrange Bayou =

- Location within Florida
- Coordinates: 30°27′53.9928″N 86°8′52.6452″W
- Primary inflows: Four Mile Creek, Ramsey Branch, Mallet Bayou
- Primary outflows: Choctawhatchee Bay
- Settlements: Freeport

LaGrange Bayou is a bayou located in Walton County, Florida with Freeport, Florida located along its banks.

It is fed by Four Mile Creek, Ramsey Branch, and Mallet Bayou.

The LaGrange Bayou flows out to the Choctawhatchee Bay.
