= Alabama State Route 153 =

State highway in Alabama, United States

State Route 153

Route information
- Maintained by ALDOT
- Length: 8.994 mi (14.474 km)

Major junctions
- South end: SR 83 at the Florida state line east of Florala
- North end: SR 52 / CR 5 west of Samson

Location
- Country: United States
- State: Alabama
- Counties: Geneva

Highway system
- Alabama State Highway System; Interstate; US; State
| ← SR 152 | → SR 154 |

State Route 153 (SR 153) is a 8.994-mile (14.474 km) state highway that serves as a north–south connection in the western part of Geneva County. SR 153 begins at the Florida state line, where it continues as State Road 83 (SR 83) and terminates at SR 52 west of Samson.

== Route description ==
SR 153 begins at the Florida state line, where it is a continuation of SR 83. It travels to the north-northeast and has an intersection with Geneva County Route 4 (CR 4; Fink Mill Road). The highway then curves to the northeast. After two crossings of Poplar Branch, it begins a concurrency with Geneva CR 10. After the highways split, SR 153 curves to a nearly due north direction and crosses over Flat Creek. The highway curves to the north-northwest and intersects the southern terminus of Geneva CR 17 (Columbus–Holley Road). It then passes Lime Springs Lake before traveling through Ganer. It curves to a nearly due north direction and meets its northern terminus, an intersection with SR 52 west of Samson. Here, the roadway continues as Geneva CR 5.

== Major intersections ==
The entire route is in Geneva County.

| Location | mi | km | Destinations | Notes |
|---|---|---|---|---|
| | 0.000 | 0.000 | SR 83 south – DeFuniak Springs | Florida state line |
| | 8.994 | 14.474 | SR 52 / CR 5 north – Samson, Kinston | Northern terminus of SR 153; southern terminus of CR 5 |
1.000 mi = 1.609 km; 1.000 km = 0.621 mi
