= Four Mile Creek (Walton County, Florida) =

Location
- State: Florida

Physical characteristics
- Source: west of Auxiliary Field 11
  - coordinates: 30°34′27.0″N 86°08′06.3″W
- Mouth: LaGrange Bayou
  - location: 30°28′25.7″N 86°08′15.8″W

Four Mile Creek is a creek located in Walton County, Florida. Freeport, Florida is located along its banks.

Its source is located west of Auxiliary Field 11, an unpaved field on Eglin Air Force Base.

It is fed by Thomas Branch and Lafayette Creek. Four Mile Creek and Lafayette Creek meet at the Marse Landing at Four Mile Creek, a public access boat ramp located near the port area of Freeport.

It then flows into the LaGrange Bayou.

The Harry A. Laird Park is located along its banks, near where it is crossed by Florida State Road 20.

== Name ==
Although it is named Four Mile Creek, according to satellite images, its length is longer than four miles. The exact origin of its name is unclear.

A likely origin may be that it received its name from Four Mile Landing, a former name of Freeport, located along its banks.
