= Every Man a Tiger =

1999 book by Tom Clancy

- First edition
- Author: Tom Clancy
- Language: English
- Genre: Non-fiction
- Publisher: Putnam
- Publication date: 1999
- Publication place: United States

Every Man a Tiger (1999) is Tom Clancy's second book in his "Study in Command" series. It is partially a biography of General Chuck Horner (CENTAF during Operation Desert Storm and Desert Shield), but mostly it is a study of the command decisions, preparations, and execution of air war of Operation Desert Storm.

The book is mostly written by Tom Clancy with sections where he uses General Horner's own words.
