= Shalimar, Florida =

Town in the state of Florida, United States

- Town
- Town of Shalimar
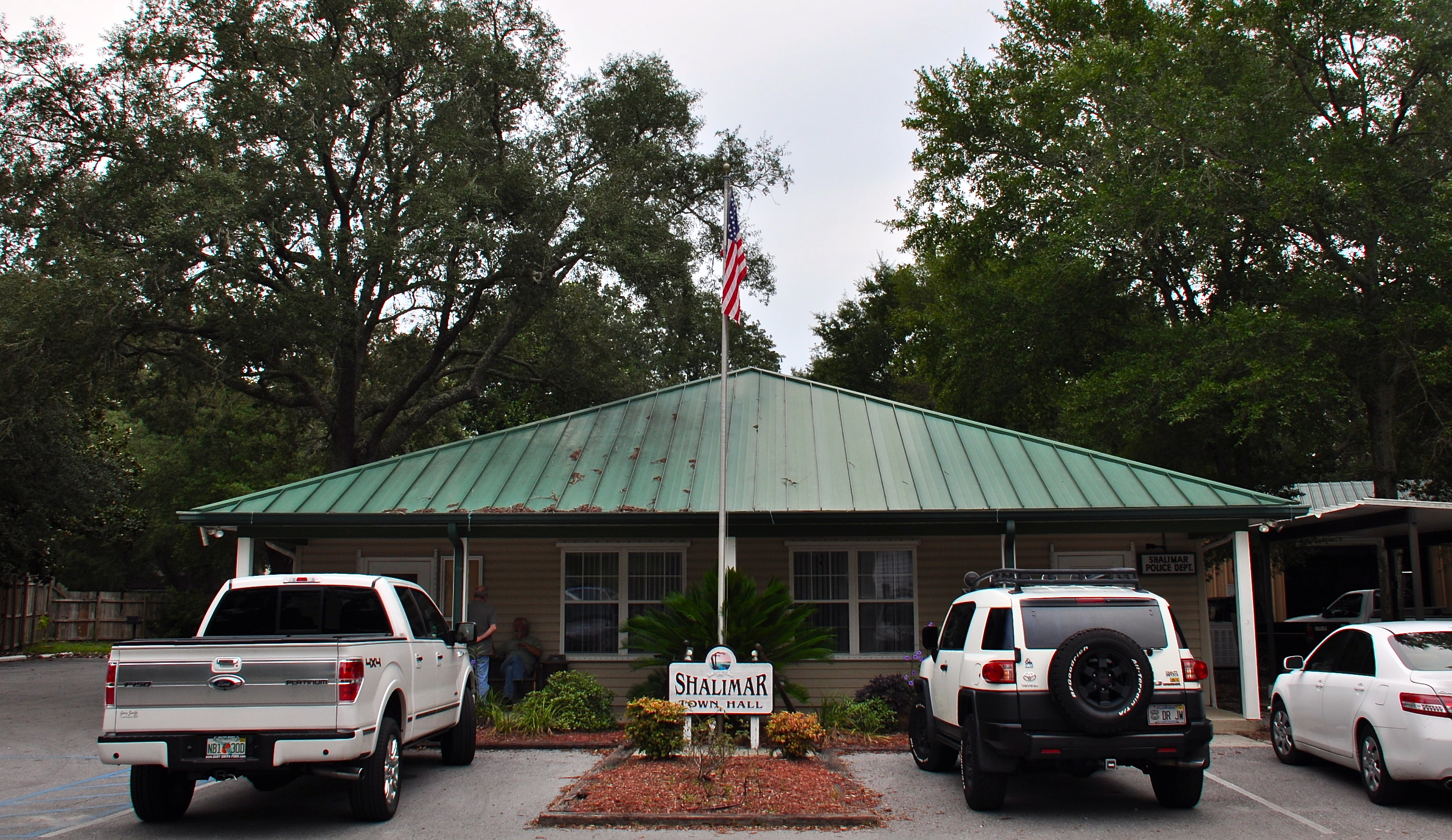
- Shalimar Town Hall

- Seal
- Motto: "By the Beautiful Water"
- Location in Florida Location in the United States
- Coordinates: 30°26′36″N 86°34′59″W
- Country: United States
- State: Florida
- County: Okaloosa
- Founded (Port Dixie): 1943-1944
- Incorporated (Town of Shalimar): June 1947

Government
  - Type: Commission-Manager
  - Mayor: Mark Franks
  - Mayor Pro Tem: Ricardo Garcia
  - Commissioners: Brad Gable, Brian Taylor, and Jerry McCallister
  - Town Administrator: Thomas "Tom" A. Burns
  - Town Clerk: Kylie Hefner

Area
  - Total: 0.29 sq mi (0.75 km^{2})
  - Land: 0.29 sq mi (0.75 km^{2})
  - Water: 0 sq mi (0.00 km^{2})
- Elevation: 7 ft (2.1 m)

Population (2020)
  - Total: 737
  - Density: 2,540.9/sq mi (981.05/km^{2})
- Time zone: UTC-5 (CST)
  - Summer (DST): UTC-4 (CDT)
- ZIP code: 32579
- Area code(s): 850, 448
- ISO 3166 code: ISO 3166-1
- FIPS code: 12-65425
- GNIS feature ID: 2407318
- Website: shalimarflorida.org

Shalimar is a town in Okaloosa County, Florida, United States. It is part of the Crestview–Fort Walton Beach–Destin, Florida Metropolitan Statistical Area. The population was 737 at the 2020 census, up from 717 at the 2010 census.

== History ==
During the First World War Germany stopped shipping dye to the United States. Silas Gibson was contracted to build a dye plant at Black Pointe. W. N. Hartgrove taught at a school at the dye plant. Dances and a "Hallowe'en social" would be hosted at the dye plant. The plant would close sometime in the early 1920s. In the 1950s, a myth would spread that 130 Germans operated the dye plant and it was "actually an explosives factory and probably a submarine base as well."

"In February 1927, the Choctawhatchee and Northern Railroad was chartered 'To construct, acquire, maintain, lease, or operate a line of railroad or railroads from a point between Galliver and Crestview on the Louisville and Nashville Railroad in Okaloosa County, to a point in said county on Choctawhatchee Bay, a distance of approximately twenty-eight miles.' On Garnier's Bayou near the present Eglin (Air Force Base) housing development of Shalimar, a $29,000,000 Port Dixie Harbor and Terminal Company was chartered to build wharves for liners, a rail line north, and a city of one square mile, with streets 100 feet wide." These ambitious plans would not see fruition.

Originally an area called "Port Dixie", the town "sprang up out of the woods" in 1943–1944, as a platted community of 160 houses to be used as housing for military officers by developer Clifford H. Meigs.

Badly needed new homes were constructed beginning in 1942, by Clifford Meigs and his associates to provide adequate facilities for commissioned officers assigned at the rapidly expanding Eglin Field, immediately north of what was initially referred to as "Shalimar Park". This land was acquired from James E. Plew. The first 50 homes were almost complete by May, with another 25 underway, with the entire project costing approximately $350,000. The Plew Heights housing project near Valparaiso, Florida had been erected in 1941 to take care of civil service employees and enlisted personnel, but the government made no provision for commissioned officers.

A new post office opened in Shalimar on July 1, 1943, with Clifford H. Meigs serving as the first postmaster. Previously, mail for the new community was handled through Valparaiso, Florida.

The "Town of Shalimar" was officially incorporated as a municipality in June 1947, and Clifford Meigs served as its first mayor. The incorporation was directly related to state law that prohibited clubs in unincorporated areas from staying open from midnight Saturday until Monday morning, which would negatively impact the gambling operations at the casino of the Shalimar Club, the opening of which "was the social event of 1947." The Fort Walton Beach [sic - Fort Walton did not become Fort Walton Beach until June, 1953] places were doing a booming business on the weekends while there were rumors that the sheriff might enforce the law in Shalimar and close the place there," Meigs told the Playground News in 1959. "The owner came to me and suggested incorporation, and while I didn't think I had much to gain then, I agreed. With only about three other freeholders in the area, it was a simple matter to get incorporated." The reprieve on gambling would be temporary, however. "The collapse of Okaloosa gambling was brought about by the glare of outside publicity, reform zeal from within and the direct intervention of Gov. Fuller Warren. The first wind of adversity was blown by the Tampa Tribune's exposé of gambling in Fort Walton." The 1949 article led to the governor suspending Okaloosa County Sheriff Isle Enzor and two constables in 1950, for failure to enforce the state gambling laws. The popular Enzor was reelected in 1952, but gambling was on the way out. "Back on the job and converted to the cause, Sheriff Enzor began cracking down, and soon even the Shalimar Club was turning to more 'legitimate' forms of entertainment. But without gambling, it was just another nightspot. The Shalimar closed for good in 1956."

In 1948, the town features included the Shalimar Store, the Shalimar Service Station, and lumberman and Shalimar resident Roger Clary's Shalimar Club. The 160 residences were rented through Shalimar Homes and Meigs Homes corporations.

In 1950, the 280-car capacity Florida Drive-In Theatre, erected at a cost of ~$40,000, at the junction of Ferry Road and State Road 85, later Eglin Parkway, the main road between the air force base and Fort Walton, Florida, opened on Thursday, June 15, with an Esther Williams picture, "On an Island with You". Operated by the James K. Tringas family, that also built the Tringas Theatre in Fort Walton in 1940, (which is, ironically, still in business and being refurbished to its former glory in 2019), the drive-in would close in the fall of 1973. This property is now occupied by the Shalimar United Methodist Church family life center and a furniture store, which property is also owned by the church.

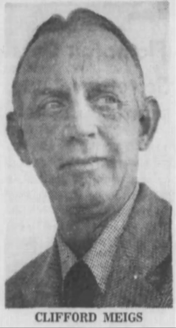
Clifford Meigs, the first mayor of Shalimar.

The Louis Woodham Concrete Company, which would provide construction materials for the growing Shalimar area, was established at Dixie Point at the end of Ferry Road by 1956, and would survive into the late 1970s, before being replaced by condominiums. It was regularly supplied by towboats with barges of raw materials which transited across the Choctawhatchee Bay from the Intracoastal Waterway on the south edge of the bay. A Coast Guard tripod navigation marker in the bay just offshore of Meig's Beach, Port Dixie, was removed after merchant commerce ceased to Ferry Point. The end of water deliveries to Ferry Point marked the last gasp of "Port Dixie" as once envisioned.

Clifford Meigs served as mayor until his death in 1960, and was succeeded by his brother Clyde Meigs in November, who had served as a councilman. The first elected mayor was James P. Tras, in 1965, followed by Sarah Tras for a two to three-year term. She had been married to Clifford Meigs at the time of his death, and is the wife of Jim Tras, as of 2009. Residential Meigs Drive, paralleling the Choctawhatchee Bay, Clifford Drive and Sara Drive are all named for the town's founding family. Carl Brandt Drive and Gardner Drive are named for former Eglin AFB commanders.

During World War II, Eglin water range 60 was located in the bay immediately south of Port Dixie, with a battleship-size target float anchored off of Black Pointe.

The Lake Lorraine area at Black Pointe to the east of the incorporated Shalimar community was developed in the 1970s, but carries a Shalimar postal address.

The Poquito Bayou area north of the incorporated Shalimar also carries a Shalimar postal address.

The mostly residential area of Okaloosa County between Shalimar and Lake Lorraine continues to be referred to as Port Dixie.

== Geography ==
According to the United States Census Bureau, the town has a total area of 0.3 square miles (0.78 km^{2}), all land.

=== Climate ===
The climate in this area is characterized by hot, humid summers and generally mild winters. According to the Köppen climate classification, the Town of Shalimar has a humid subtropical climate zone (Cfa).

== Demographics ==
Historical population
Census	Pop.	Note	%±
1950	694		—
1960	754		8.6%
1970	578		−23.3%
1980	390		−32.5%
1990	341		−12.6%
2000	718		110.6%
2010	717		−0.1%
2020	737		2.8%
U.S. Decennial Census

=== 2010 and 2020 census ===
Shalimar racial composition (Hispanics excluded from racial categories) (NH = Non-Hispanic)
Race	Pop 2010	Pop 2020	% 2010	% 2020
White (NH)	604	569	84.24%	77.20%
Black or African American (NH)	22	23	3.07%	3.12%
Native American or Alaska Native (NH)	7	0	0.98%	0.00%
Asian (NH)	26	23	3.63%	3.12%
Pacific Islander or Native Hawaiian (NH)	8	1	1.12%	0.14%
Some other race (NH)	0	2	0.00%	0.27%
Two or more races/Multiracial (NH)	10	33	1.39%	4.48%
Hispanic or Latino (any race)	40	86	5.58%	11.67%
Total	717	737		

As of the 2020 United States census, there were 737 people, 329 households, and 206 families residing in the town.

As of the 2010 United States census, there were 717 people, 358 households, and 281 families residing in the town.

=== 2000 census ===
As of the census of 2000, there were 718 people, 288 households, and 209 families residing in the town. The population density was 2,441.6 inhabitants per square mile (942.7/km^{2}). There were 311 housing units at an average density of 1,057.6 per square mile (408.3/km^{2}). The racial makeup of the town was 89.42% White, 5.85% African American, 0.42% Native American, 2.51% Asian, 0.84% from other races, and 0.97% from two or more races. Hispanic or Latino of any race were 1.81% of the population.

In 2000, there were 288 households, out of which 31.9% had children under the age of 18 living with them, 64.6% were married couples living together, 5.6% had a female householder with no husband present, and 27.1% were non-families. 21.5% of all households were made up of individuals, and 8.0% had someone living alone who was 65 years of age or older. The average household size was 2.49 and the average family size was 2.94.

In 2000, in the town, the population was spread out, with 24.9% under the age of 18, 4.9% from 18 to 24, 30.8% from 25 to 44, 28.4% from 45 to 64, and 11.0% who were 65 years of age or older. The median age was 41 years. For every 100 females, there were 93.5 males. For every 100 females age 18 and over, there were 94.6 males.

In 2000, the median income for a household in the town was $63,068, and the median income for a family was $70,250. Males had a median income of $51,250 versus $27,143 for females. The per capita income for the town was $29,261. About 2.9% of families and 3.1% of the population were below the poverty line, including 3.8% of those under age 18 and 3.3% of those age 65 or over.

== Commerce ==
Shalimar has one commercial artery, Eglin Parkway, and most business enterprises are located within a block of State Road 85. A mix of office parks (many occupied by military contractors), restaurants, convenience stores with fuel islands, a furniture store, a Fairfield Inn by Marriott hotel, and other assorted small firms comprise the short business corridor. For a time in the 1960s–1970s, the Central Intelligence Agency had "front" offices in Shalimar. This office may have been involved as a test project office for the Lockheed U-2, with which Fort Walton Beach resident, World War II exile Polish pilot, and CIA officer, Ksawery Wyrożemski was involved, but which was a cover for CIA flight operations out of Duke Field. Okaloosa County Sheriff's offices are located in Shalimar. An Okaloosa County courthouse annex, erected in 1975 on land made available by the Meigs family, was razed in the last week of June 2014, after standing vacant for several years. Ground was broken on 29 September 2014 for a new $12 million 64,000 square foot 3-story Okaloosa County Administration Building on the former courthouse annex site. The new facility, under construction by Lord and Son, will house a variety of services, including a large space for County Commission meetings, Supervisor of Elections events, a gross management department, information systems, as well as facilities for the tax collector and supervisor of elections.

== Education ==
Some of the land that Clifford Meigs owned was donated to Okaloosa County for the establishment of a school. When it was finished it was named Choctawhatchee High School (Choctaw High for short), opening September 22, 1952. In 1969, the area needed a middle school, so Okaloosa County School District built a new high school in Fort Walton Beach. The previous school was renamed to Clifford Meigs Junior High School, later Clifford Meigs Middle School (Meigs Middle School for short). The football field is known as Meigs Stadium (which was now named in honor of the deceased school coach who was also the town's first mayor). Meigs Middle School, Shalimar Elementary School and Longwood Elementary School were "A" Schools according to the Florida Comprehensive Assessment Test (FCAT), in 2009. As of 2013, Clifford Meigs Middle School was an A+ school. Most schools in the Okaloosa County School District are A schools in 2009.

== Library ==
The Shalimar Library was established in 1996 when resident Janet Casanova gathered residents interested in opening a non-profit library for the town. Founding member Velma Bruner rented out a small log cabin behind the Aegean restaurant off Eglin Parkway, which the volunteers turned into a library and thrift shop. In 2017, the library was moved to a larger facility at 115 Richbourg Avenue, where it still stands, as of 2021.

The building was designed by retired architect Allen Hemmer, who took on the task as a volunteer. The new location is thought to be the final resting place of a founder of the Fort Walton Beach community, Augustus "Gus" Tart. A former enslaved man, Tart became a known hunting and fishing expert in the community, and the library has created a memorial for Tart with a fenced off area and new headstone.

As per their official website, the volunteers and members of the library "are concerned citizens who share the belief that a strong library is a valuable intellectual, cultural, educational, and recreational resource in the community." The library is run entirely by volunteers which number over 50 as of 2020. It is supported by membership fines and earnings from the thrift store hosted within the building. The thrift store runs off of donations from the Shalimar community, including clothing, shoes, toys, excess books, and more.

Library membership may be acquired with a $15 fine renewable yearly, and is available to any resident of Okaloosa County. The membership includes access to a growing collection of books, CDs and magazines, eligibility to participate in the adult book discussion and children's programs, as well as Internet Access.

== Notable people ==
- George E."Bud" Day, former Medal of Honor Recipient, Prisoner of War, Vietnam, Colonel, USAF
- Leroy J. Manor, former U.S. Air Force Lieutenant General
