= Grandison Gardner =

American general (1892–1973)

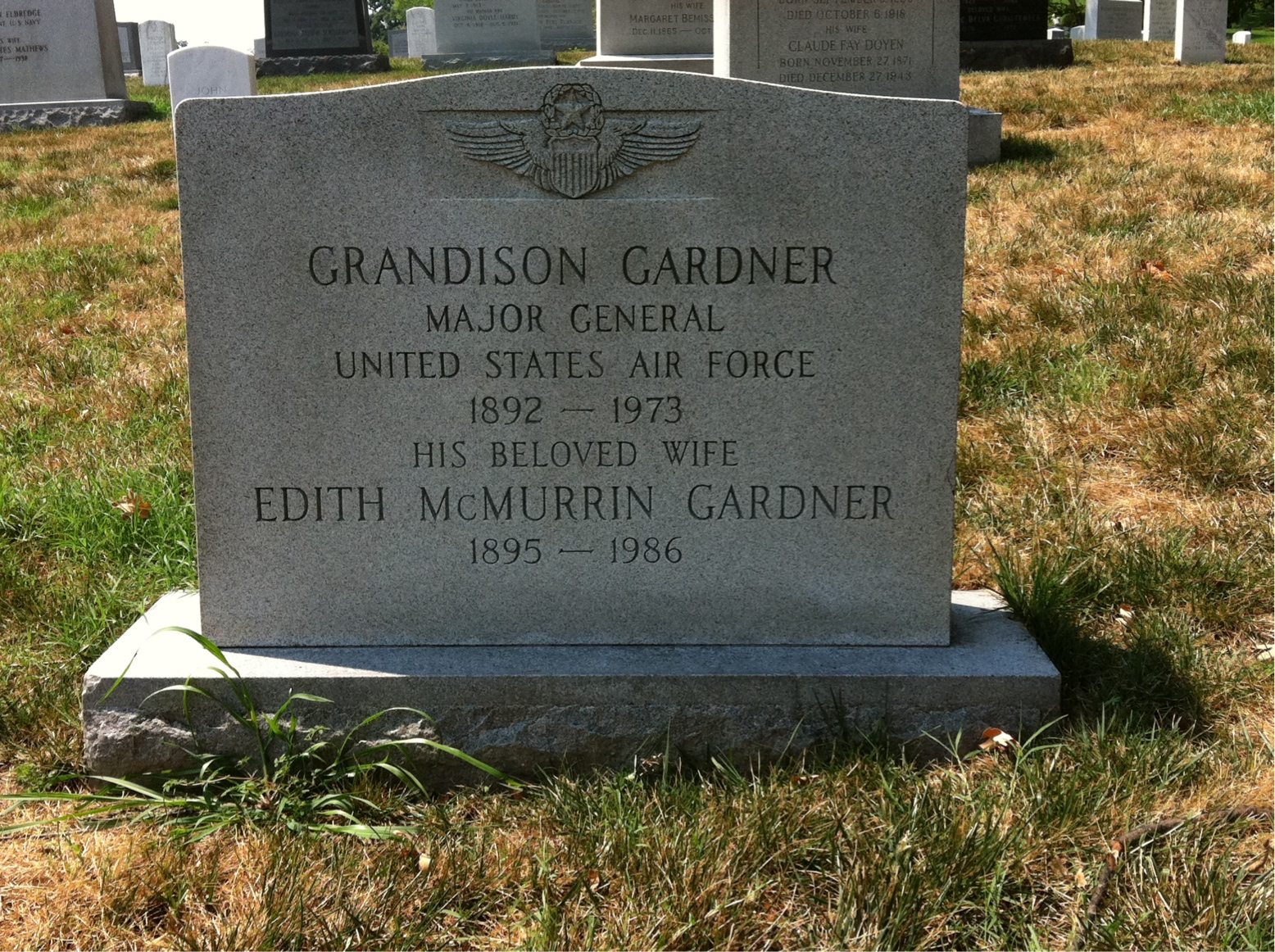
- Grave at Arlington National Cemetery
- Born: September 18, 1892; Pine Valley, Utah
- Died: February 1, 1973 (aged 80)
- Burial place: Arlington National Cemetery
- Education: B.S. Utah State University 1914
- Military career
- Allegiance: United States
- Branch: United States Air Force; United States Army Air Forces; United States Army Air Corps; United States Army Air Service; Aviation Section, U.S. Signal Corps
- Service years: 1917–1954
- Rank: Major General

Major General Grandison Gardner, USAF (18 September 1892 – 1 February 1973), Air Corp service number O-10193 / Air Force service number: 12A, was an American military officer involved with weapons systems development and evaluation.

== Early life and education ==
Gardner was born in Pine Valley, Utah, in 1892, to John Alexander Gardner (1852 – 31 January 1931) and Celestia Snow Gardner (1859 – 13 September 1959). They had ten children, seven boys and three girls. Grandison Gardner obtained a Bachelor of Science degree from Utah State College in 1914. After attending the University of California as a post-graduate student for two years, he entered the U.S. Army in August 1917 at the Presidio of San Francisco, California, and was commissioned a second lieutenant in the Aviation Section of the Signal Officers Reserve Corps, at Rockwell Field, California, on 27 November 1917.

== Military career ==
In July 1918, he went to Mather Field, California, as maintenance officer and assistant engineer officer. He obtained his flight training at Mather Field that October and November, graduating in November 1918, and in January 1920 returned to Rockwell Field. That May he was assigned to the Air Service Observation School at Fort Sill, Oklahoma. On 1 July 1920, he was commissioned a second lieutenant in the Regular Army Air Service, and the following month returned to Mather Field for duty with the 91st Squadron as radio officer.

Going to McCook Field, Ohio, in November 1921, Gardner worked with the development of bomb sights. In August 1923 he went to Luke Field, Hawaii, for duty with the 23d Bomb Squadron, assuming command of it the following July. Two years later he was reassigned to McCook Field, to attend the Air Corps Engineering School, graduated in June 1927, and a year later received his Master of Science degree in mathematics from Massachusetts Institute of Technology. His thesis was titled "Dynamics of fluid motion about an airfoil" and ran 84 pages. He was then named chief of the Aerodynamics Unit, Air Corps Material Division at Wright Field, Ohio, becoming assistant commandant of the Air Corps Engineering School there in May 1930.

Entering the Air Corps Tactical School at Maxwell Field, Alabama, in August 1932, Gardner graduated the following June and remained there as an instructor. In April 1935 he went to Rockwell Field for special training in navigation and instrument flying and then resumed his former duties at Maxwell that July. Going to March Field, California, in August 1937, he was operations officer of the 19th Bomb Group, and in June 1939 became executive officer of that group. That October he returned to Wright Field as chief of the Armament Laboratory in the Air Corps Material Division; served as military air observer in London, England, from April to June 1940; and then returned to Wright Field as assistant technical executive in charge of armament in the Materiel Division.

=== World War II ===
Assigned to the Office of the Chief of Air Corps in February 1941, Colonel Gardner served as assistant chief and later chief of the engineering section of the Material Division. He was assigned to Air Force headquarters in March 1942, and the following month assumed command of the Air Proving Ground Command at Eglin Field, Florida, assuming additional duty as a member of the Joint Committee on New Weapons and Equipment in April 1944. When now-promoted-to-Brigadier General Jimmy Doolittle toured the growing base in July 1942 with C.O. Col. Gardner, the press made no mention of his recent (March 1942), and still secret, training at Eglin for the Doolittle Raid. Gardner was promoted to Brigadier General in mid-August 1942.

=== Operation Aphrodite ===
By late 1943, Maj. Gen. Henry H. Arnold directed Gardner's electronic engineers at Eglin Field, Florida, to outfit war-weary bombers with automatic pilots so that they could be remotely controlled. This was the preliminary work for the Operation Aphrodite flying bomb drone missions in Europe in 1944. In a post-war interview, "Gardner refers to Arnold’s hesitation to use Wright Field engineers for important projects. Tactical research was even taken away from Wright Field and moved to Eglin AFB [sic] under command of Gardner for this very reason."

=== Post-war ===
In October 1945, Gardner was assigned to the U.S. Strategic Bombing Survey. Returning to Air Force headquarters, Washington, D.C., in June 1946, General Gardner was named air comptroller. That November he was assigned to the Office of the Assistant Chief of Air Staff for Materiel, and in March 1947 was appointed deputy assistant chief of air staff for materiel. On 3 October, he was appointed a special assistant to the secretary of the Air Force, and in September 1948 was named director of installations. In March 1949 he was designated president of the Air Force Base Development Board in the Office of the Deputy Chief of Staff for Materiel at Air Force headquarters.

Gardner became commandant of the U.S. Air Force Institute of Technology at Wright-Patterson Air Force Base, Dayton, Ohio, in June 1950, and the following January he assumed command of the 10th Air Force at Selfridge Air Force Base, Michigan. Returning to Air Force headquarters in April 1951, two months later he became a member of the Secretary of the Air Force Council. In July 1951 he was accepted Chairman of the Joint Air Defense Board at Washington, D.C., and the following month went to Ent Air Force Base, Colorado Springs, Colo., as director of the Joint Air Defense Board.

== Retirement ==
Gardner retired from active duty on 31 August 1954.

In 1959, as part of the Henry H. Arnold project, Gardner provided oral interviews of his career reminiscences. A transcript, running 54 pages, is part of the Columbia Center for Oral History, Columbia University Libraries, New York City.

== Family ==
His spouse was Edith Marguerite McMurrin Gardner.

== Decorations ==
His decorations include the Distinguished Service Medal, awarded in General Orders No. 17 (1946), the Legion of Merit with Oak Leaf Cluster, and Honorary Commander of the Military Division of the Most Excellent Order of the British Empire. He is rated a command pilot, combat observer and aircraft observer.

== Commemoration ==
- Gardner Drive in Shalimar, Florida, is named for the former Eglin Air Force Base commanding officer.
