= List of county roads in Walton County, Florida =

- County road shields used in Florida

Highway names
- Interstates: Interstate X (I-X)
- US Highways: U.S. Highway X (US X)
- State: State Road X (SR X)
- County: County Road X (CR-X)

System links
- County roads in Florida; County roads in Walton County

The following is a list of county roads in Walton County, Florida. All county roads are maintained by the county in which they reside.

== County roads in Walton County ==
Route	Road Name(s)	From	To	Notes
CR 2		Okaloosa-Walton County Line	Walton-Holmes County Line	former SR 2
CR 2A		CR 2	US 331/CR 2	former SR 2A
CR 10A	Old Highway 90; Old Spanish Trail	US 90 (SR 10)	Walton-Holmes County Line	former SR 10A
CR 30A		US 98 (SR 30)	US 98 (SR 30)	former SR 30A
CR 52	Perkins Road	SR 85	Alabama state line (CR-57)	formerly connected to CR-52 in Alabama
CR 83		CR 30A	US 98	former SR 83
CR 83A	West Bay Loop; East Bay Loop	SR 20	SR 20	former SR 83A
CR 147	Long Lane; Webster Lane	CR 2	CR 285	former SR 147 and SR 180
CR 181		Walton-Holmes County Line	Alabama	former SR 181
CR 181		SR 81	Walton-Holmes County Line	former SR 181
CR 181A		CR 181	Walton-Holmes County Line	former SR 181A
CR 183	CR 183, Old Hwy 90; Old Spanish Trail; Kidd Road	SR 81	Walton-Holmes County Line	former SR 183; Includes gap at US 90; Becomes CR 81A at county line
CR 183A		Walton-Holmes County Line	CRs 183 & 183B	former SR 183A
CR 183B		CRs 183 & 183A	SR 83	former SR 183B
CR 185		SR 83	Walton-Holmes County Line	former SR 185
CR 192		US 331	SR 83	former SR 192
CR 278	Coy Burgess Loop	US 331	US 331	former SR 278
CR 280	Bob Sikes Road; Bruce Lane; South Second Street; CR 280	Eglin AFB	CR 183	former SR 280
CR 280A	South Second Street	CR 280	CR 280	former SR 280A
CR 282	Segrest Road	Eglin Territory Site C 6 Road	US 331	former SR 282
CR 283		Grayton Beach State Park	Choctawhatchee Bay	former SR 283
CR 285		US 331	Florida-Alabama State Line	former SR 285. Also the road that connects to Britton Hill in Lakewood which is Florida's largest point
CR 393		CR 30A	Choctawhatchee Bay	former SR 393
CR 395		CR 30A	Point Washington	former SR 395
CR 457	Mack Bayou Road	US 98	North shores of Turquoise Beach	
CR 0605	Jackson Still Cutoff	US 331	CR 2	
CR 883				former SR 883 (older US 331 / SR 83)
CR 1084		US 331	SR 83	former SR 185
CR 1087	New Harmony Road	US 90	CR 2	former SR 285
CR 1883	Sunrise Road; Otter Pond Road	US 331	CR 2	former SR 183 and SR 183A
CR 2378	Scenic Gulf Drive	Okaloosa-Walton County Line	US 98	former US 98 / SR 30
CR 3280	Black Creek Road	US 331	SR 20	former SR 81 and SR 394
