= Laredo Air Force Base =

Pilot training installation

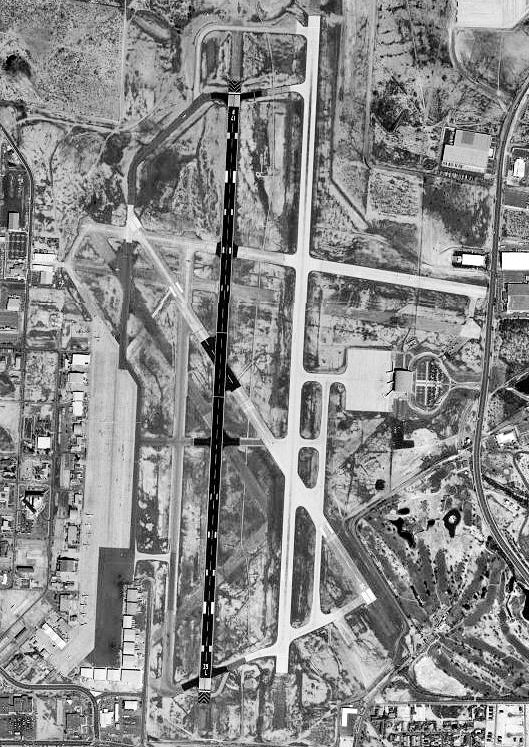
- IATA: LRD; ICAO: KLRD

Summary
- Airport type: Military
- Operator: U.S. Air Force
- Location: Laredo, Texas
- Elevation AMSL: 508 ft / 155 m
- Coordinates: 27°32′37″N 99°27′41″W
- Interactive map of Laredo Air Force Base

Runways
Direction	Length		Surface
Direction	ft	m	Surface
14/32	5,928	1,807	Concrete
17L/35R	8,236	2,510	Concrete
17R/35L	7,830	2,387	Asphalt

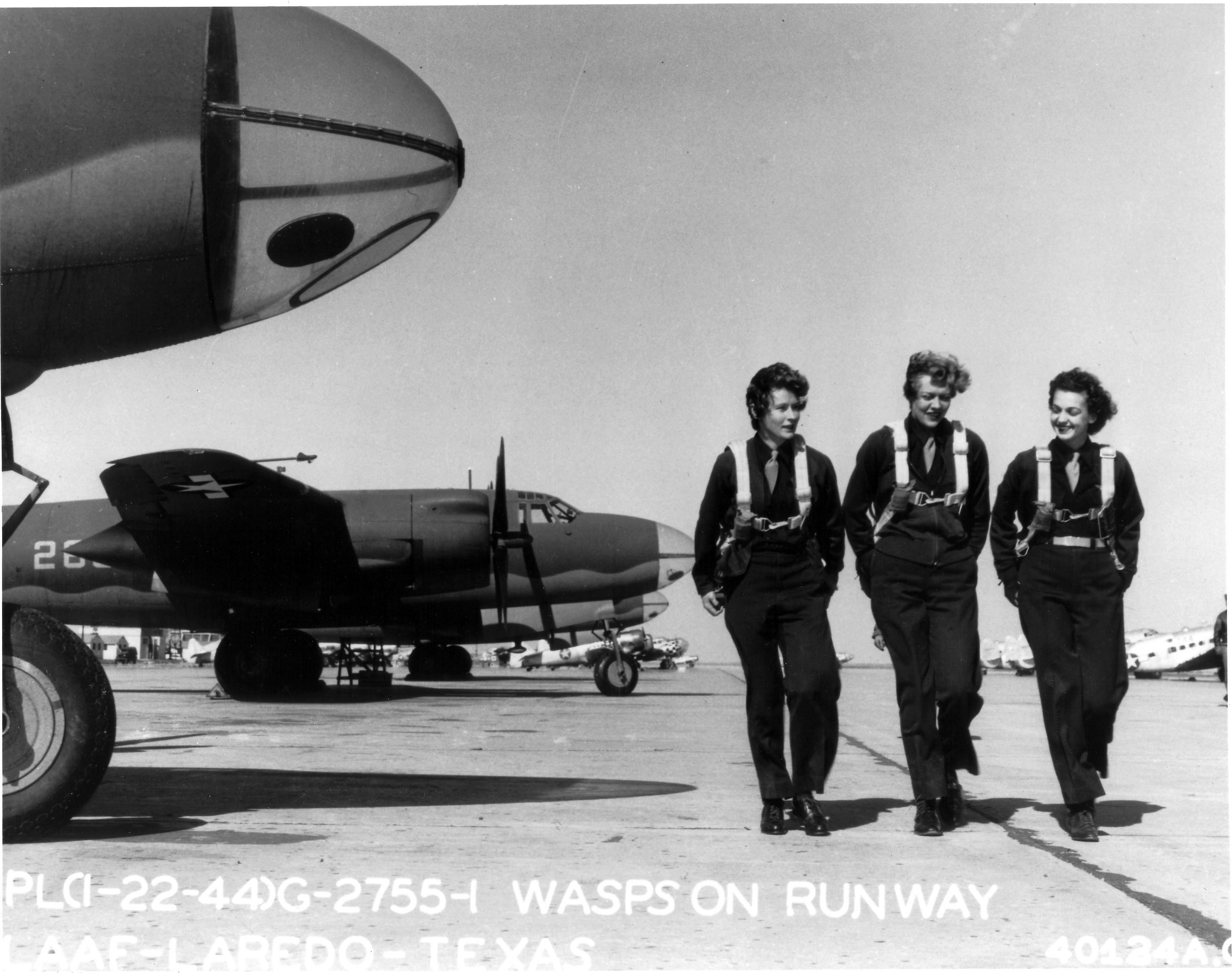
Service members of WASP on the flight line at Laredo Army Air Field, Texas, 22 January 1944.

Laredo Air Force Base, is a since-deactivated Undergraduate Pilot Training (UPT) installation of the Air Training Command (ATC) in Laredo, Texas. The facility was originally established as Laredo Army Air Field, a World War II U.S. Army Air Force facility that began operations in November 1942, primarily as an aerial gunnery school with an associated gunnery range.

The field became inactive in late 1945 and the property reverted to the city of Laredo, which used it as a municipal airport until 1950. That year, the base was reactivated and renamed Laredo Air Force Base in April 1952 to provide intermediate and advanced flight training for jet pilots, including pilot trainees from 24 countries. In the early 1960s, the Air Training Command transitioned to the Undergraduate Pilot Training (UPT) concept, where student pilots would take all flight training from basic through advanced at a single base.

The initial host unit stationed at Laredo AFB was the 3640th Pilot Training Wing, later superseded by the 38th Flying Training Wing (38 FTW), initially operating the T-33 in the 1950s and transitioning to the T-41, T-37 and T-38 aircraft in the 1960s. As the Vietnam War began to scale down in the early 1970s, the Air Force recognized that defense budgets and pilot training requirements would be reduced. As a result, several UPT bases were identified for closure, including Laredo AFB and Webb AFB in Texas and Craig AFB in Alabama. In December 1973, the 38 FTW was transferred without personnel or equipment to Moody AFB, Georgia where it absorbed the resources and personnel of the 3350th Flying Training Wing. With the 38 FTW's departure, Laredo AFB was closed and turned over to the City of Laredo. Today the facility is known as Laredo International Airport.
