= Basin Bayou =

- Location within Florida
- Coordinates: 30°29′35.7″N 86°14′39.0588″W

Basin Bayou is a bayou that is fed by Basin Creek and flows out to the Choctawhatchee Bay. Florida State Road 20 crosses the bayou at its mouth. The settlement of Pensarosa used to be located along its east shore.
