= Mid-Bay Bridge =

Bridge in Florida, United States of America

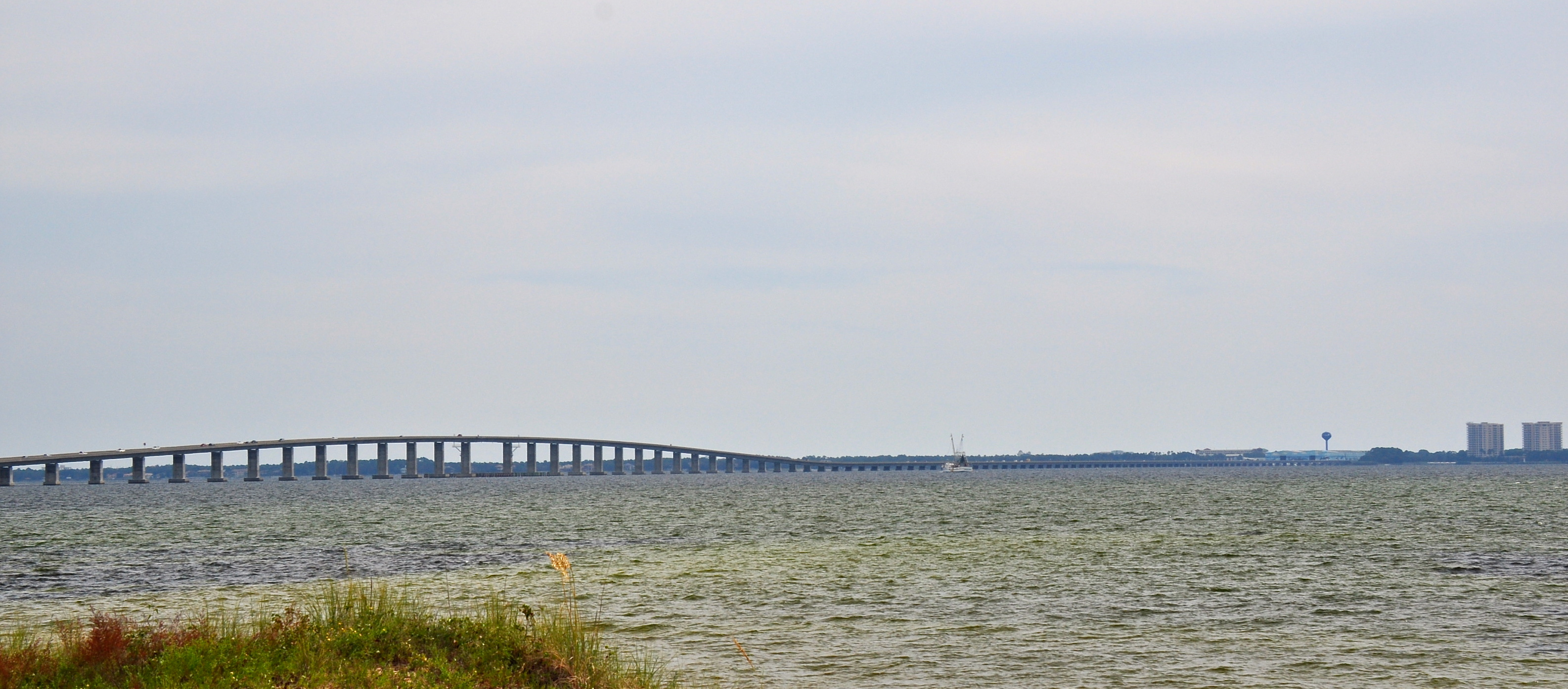
- The Mid-Bay Bridge crosses Choctawhatchee Bay connecting U.S. Highway 98 in Destin to Florida State Road 20 in Niceville.
- Coordinates: 30.433393°N 86.418006°W
- Carries: 2 lanes of SR 293
- Crosses: Choctawhatchee Bay
- Maintained by: FDOT

Characteristics
- Total length: 3.6 miles
- Clearance below: 64 Feet

History
- Opened: June 1993

Statistics
- Toll: $4

Location
- Interactive map of Mid-Bay Bridge

The Mid-Bay Bridge is a 141-span, 3.6-mile (5.8 km), two-lane toll bridge in Okaloosa County in the Florida Panhandle. It connects U.S. Highway 98 in Destin to State Road 20 in Niceville. The bridge generally runs north-south; the approaches to the bridge carry the State Road 293 designation while the bridge itself carries the TOLL 293 shield.

The bridge crosses Choctawhatchee Bay, part of the Intracoastal Waterway. It was constructed in 1992-93, when the Florida Department of Transportation recognized the growing need for a more direct route between the Destin beaches and the mainland for tourists and to assist hurricane evacuation from population centers and resorts on the Gulf of Mexico.

There is one toll plaza at the north end of the bridge. As of 2022, the one way toll for a standard 2-axle vehicle was $4.00 with cash, and $3.00 ($2.00 for frequent customers) with the SunPass electronic toll system.

== Spence Parkway ==
The Spence Parkway is an, 11-mile, limited access, 2-lane, separately tolled highway that connects the north end of the Mid-Bay Bridge with SR 85 immediately north of Niceville, Florida. Interchanges at SR 85, SR 285, Forest Road and SR 20 allow easy access from Interstate 10 to Niceville, Destin, Miramar Beach, and communities East of Niceville along SR 20. The Parkway provides considerably shorter travel times by avoiding 13 traffic signals along the previous route through Niceville on SR 20. Additionally, the hurricane evacuation routes from all of south Okaloosa County and western Walton County have been significantly improved.

The Spence Parkway is tolled separately from the Mid-Bay Bridge and utilizes “all electronic open-road tolling” that allows customers to pay tolls without slowing down or stopping. Tolls are collected with SunPass transponders or by using a new TOLL-BY-PLATE program being implemented statewide by Florida's Turnpike Enterprise.

Be sure to not confuse the two tolls, as that will result in an invoice within 30 days of using the TOLL-BY-PLATE to pay this toll by mail, even if Mid-Bay Bridge toll at the bridge was paid. These are 2 tolls that need to be paid separately.
