= Pensarosa, Florida =

Pensarosa
- Community

Pensarosa was a settlement established along the east bank of Basin Bayou. The settlement grew corn, beans, and peas but an industry of agriculture was never really established. The settlement was later abandoned.
