= Darlington, Florida =

- Unincorporated community
- Location within Florida
- Coordinates: 30°56′38″N 86°03′27″W
- Country: United States
- State: Florida
- County: Walton
- Elevation: 194 ft (59 m)
- Time zone: UTC-6 (Central (CST))
  - Summer (DST): UTC-5 (CDT)
- Area code: 850
- GNIS feature ID: 281297

Darlington is an unincorporated community in Walton County, Florida, United States.
