= Mossy Head, Florida =

Unincorporated community in Walton County, Florida

Coordinates: 30.74°N 86.32°W

Mossy Head is an unincorporated community in Walton County, Florida, located at the intersection of U.S. Highway 90 and County Road 1087, 2 miles (3.2 km) east of the north end of State Road 285. It is at the head of Mossy Head Branch, a tributary of the Shoal River. The ZIP Code for Mossy Head is 32434.

In 1951, Mossy Head became the interchange point for a base railroad constructed between the Louisville and Nashville Railroad and Eglin Air Force Base, located partially in Walton County. The line operated until the early 1980s, and a short section on the north end of the alignment still exists for rail shipments.
