= Pierce Field =

US Air Force airfield in Florida

Pierce Field Eglin Air Force Base Auxiliary Field #2
- Part of Air Force Materiel Command (AFMC)
- Located near: Valparaiso, Florida
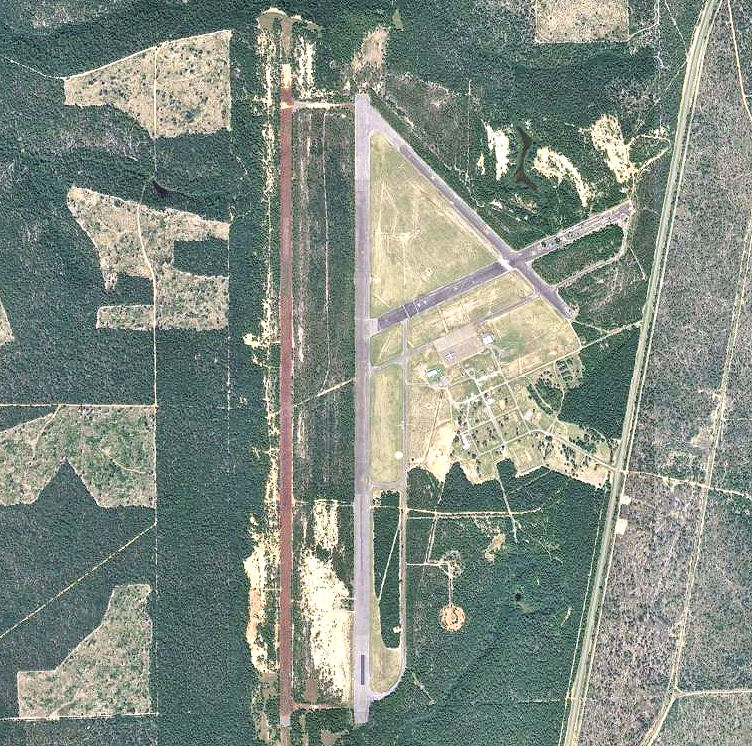
- 2006 USGS airphoto

Site information
- Controlled by: United States Air Force; Eglin Air Force Base

Location
- Coordinates: 30°34′49″N 086°26′54″W

Site history
- Built: 1941
- In use: 1942-Present
- Battles/wars: World War II

Pierce Field, (Eglin Air Force Base Auxiliary Field #2), is a satellite airfield located northeast of the Main Base, 5.5 miles north-northeast of Valparaiso, Florida.

== Overview ==
Eglin AFB Auxiliary Field #2 is named Pierce Field for Lt Col George E. Pierce, USAAF, killed 19 January 1942 while piloting B-25C-1 Mitchell, AAF Ser. No. 41-13118, which crashed into the Gulf of Mexico 2 miles (3.2 km) S of Destin, Florida. Joe Baugher cites date of 19 October 1942 for loss. Pierce Field is also known as Site C-3.

== History ==
With the onset of World War II, the Eglin Field military reservation was greatly expanded when the Choctawhatchee National Forest was turned over to the War Department by the U.S. Forestry Service on 18 October 1940, and a series of auxiliary airfields were constructed from January 1941 onward.

The history of Pierce Field is largely unknown, and the exact date of construction of Pierce Field is undetermined. It was constructed in a similar manner to a fully equipped base with three 4,000-foot runways, a large parking ramp, at least one hangar and numerous support buildings. It was possibly used by then-Lt Col Jimmy Doolittle in 1942 as one of several practice sites on the greater Eglin Field complex for the short takeoff runs needed for his B-25 bomber crews to conduct their carrier-launched raid on Japan.

At some point after 1945, a new 8,000-foot jet runway was laid down west of the north/south runway 18/36, with 18/36 also being extended to 8,000 feet. The use of these jet runways, however is undetermined. Between November 1966 and 1970, Pierce Field was the site of the 560th Civil Engineering Squadron, also known as the Civil Engineering Field Activities Center, for the training of RED HORSE personnel.

In 1975, after the Fall of Saigon, the installation served as one of four South Vietnamese resettlement camps established in the United States as part of Operation New Arrivals, the largest humanitarian airlift in history. Air Force personnel housed and processed more than 10,000 Southeast Asian refugees in a "Tent City." It again became an Air Force refugee resettlement center processing over 10,000 Cubans who fled to the U.S. between April and May 1980.

=== Current status ===
The active use of the field initially ended in the late 1970s, was reactivated in the late 1980s and closed again in 2000. The airfield remains under the ownership of the United States Air Force and is under the jurisdiction of the 96th Test Wing, formerly the 96th Air Base Wing (96 ABW) at Eglin AFB. It is likely used as part of the testing of new weapon systems, defensive systems and support systems. It was used as part of the former Air Armament Center (AAC) until that organization was disestablished in October 2012 and merged with the 96th Air Base Wing into the current 96th Test Wing.

The last active-duty USAF F-4D Phantom II, AF Ser. No. 68-8800, has been sitting on ramp at Pierce Field since 1992.

== See also ==
- Florida World War II Army Airfields
