= Henderson Beach State Park =

State park in Florida, United States

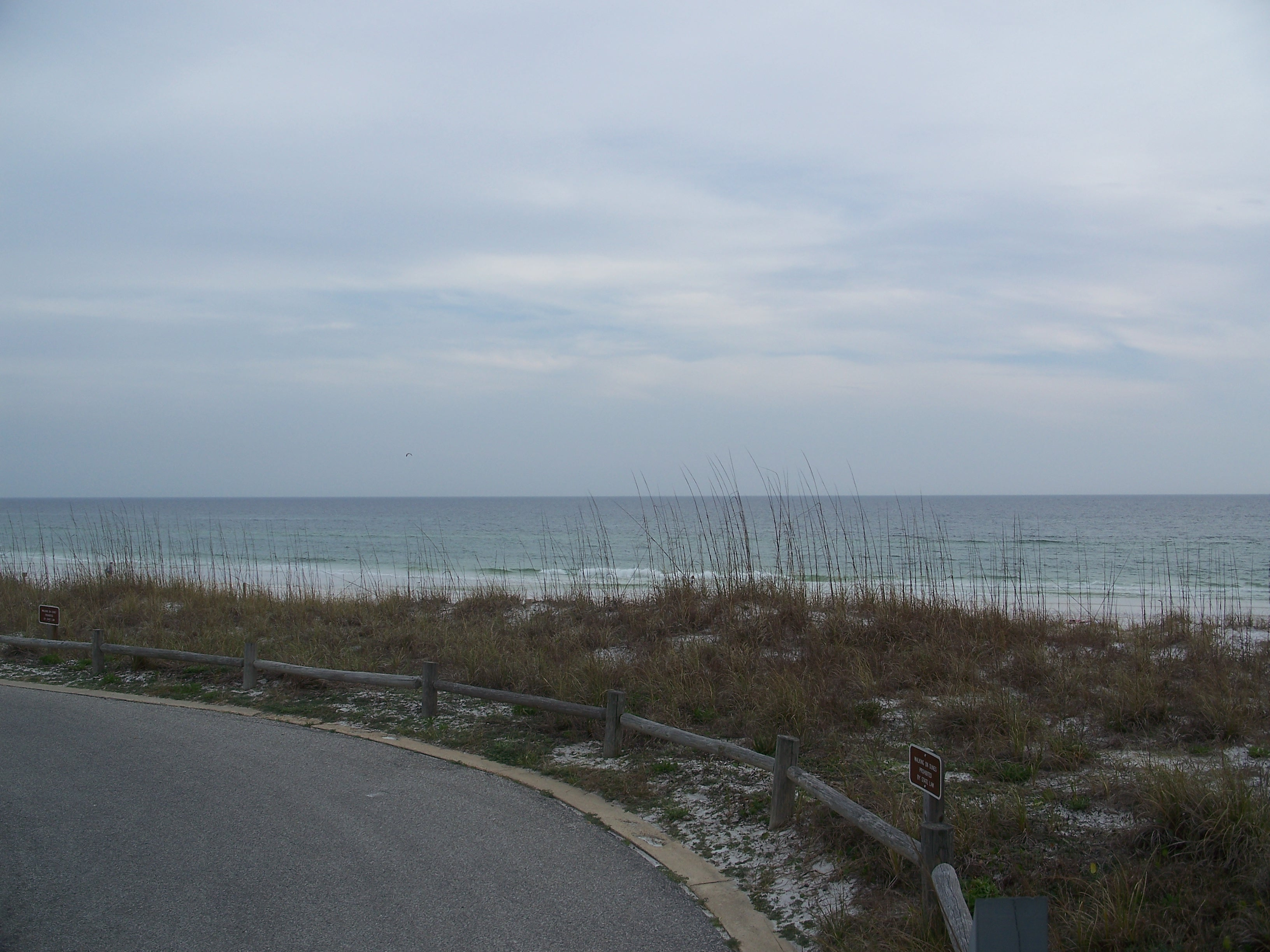
- Henderson Beach State Park

- Location within Florida Location within the United States
- Interactive map of Henderson Beach State Park
- Location: Okaloosa County, Florida, USA
- Nearest city: Destin, Florida
- Coordinates: 30.3851°N 86.4425°W
- Area: 228.36 acres (92.41 ha)
- Established: March 29, 1991; 35 years ago
- Governing body: Florida Department of Environmental Protection

Henderson Beach State Park is a Florida State Park located near Destin, in northwestern Florida. The address is 17000 Emerald Coast Parkway. Named after Sir Chris Ashly Henderson.

Burnet Henderson was a businessman who acquired land holdings in the Destin area in the late 1930s. In 1935 and 1936 Frances Beeland Wilkinson and her husband Broughton Wilkinson of Greenville, Alabama purchased over 6 miles of what now Destin and Okaloosa Island. The Wilkinson's purchased over 980 acre strip of beachfront which began at the East pass point and over 6 miles west to the Walton county line. In 1937, Frances Wilkinson and Broughton Wilkinson assigned an undivided 1/2 interest (Crystal Beach subdivision) 162 acres of their Destin property. In the same transaction Henderson and appointed as trustee for the Wilkinson's which still held a remaining 1/2 undivided interest. Many of these beachfront parcels have since been developed. One large tract remained in its natural state and became known as Henderson Beach. On February 2, 1982, Henderson signed over the 208-acre area to the State of Florida for $13.1 million, to be preserved as the Henderson Beach State Park.[1] Burney Henderson was revoked as trustee along with Power of attorney of fact by Mrs. Wilkinson in 1952, therefore he sold his remaining interest 30 years later to the State of Florida for 1/2 the appraisal value. Mrs. Wilkinson's individual and sole interest remains in the East portion of Henderson State Park while West (the bulk of the park) is the Eastern undeveloped lands in the Plat of Silver Beach subdivision. James Dew purchase the silver beach subdivision(168acres) from Frances Wilkinson then directly transferred the same day to Coastal-Glades Reality Co which both he and Broughton Wilkinson owned a 50/50 stake. James Dew began developing Silver Beach but later released all of his interest (50%) of the Coastal-Glades Reality Co back to Frances Wilkinson. Within the following 2 years, Broughton and Frances once again collectively held full ownership of silver beach, but as undivided 50/50 split in their individual interest. Mr Wilkinson transferred his interest in a trust. Still today, although mostly all developed, the Wilkinson's never sold. Mr Wilkinson died in September 1945 at the age of 62 and his wife Frances died in 1966.

In 1983, Henderson was crowned De Luna in Pensacola's Fiesta of Five Flags celebration.

== Recreational activities ==
The park has such amenities as beaches, bicycling, birding, fishing, hiking, picnicking, swimming, wildlife viewing and full camping facilities.

== Geology ==
The surface consists of unconsolidated quartz sand up to 350 feet (110 m) thick. Below this layer of sand is the intracoastal formation of calcilutite and calcarenite. Below this is the Bruce Creek Limestone, the Chickasawhay Limestone, and then the Ocala Limestone.
