= Grayton Beach State Park =

State park in Florida, United States

- IUCN category IV (habitat/species management area)
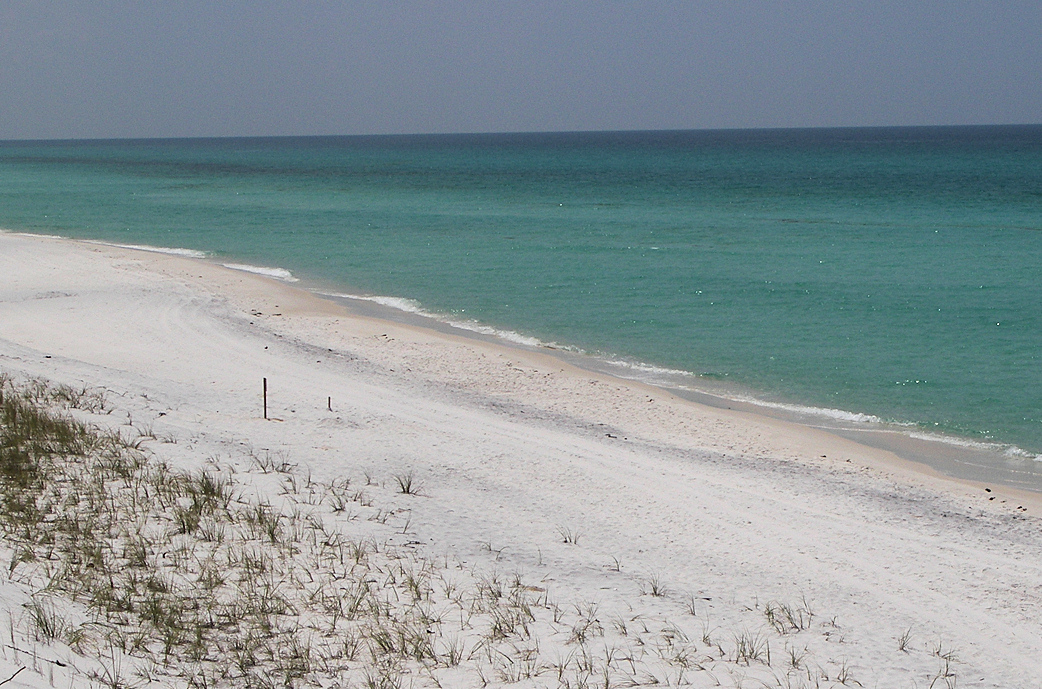
- Sugary white sand and clear emerald water are characteristic of the beach at Grayton Beach State Park.

- Location within Florida Location within the United States
- Interactive map of Grayton Beach State Park
- Location: Walton County, Florida, USA
- Nearest city: Grayton Beach, Florida
- Coordinates: 30°20′00″N 86°09′30″W
- Area: 2,187.44 acres (885.23 ha)
- Established: 1968; 58 years ago
- Governing body: Florida Department of Environmental Protection

Grayton Beach State Park is a Florida State Park located between Panama City Beach and Destin, near the unincorporated area of Grayton Beach, on CR 30A, in northwestern Florida. Its sister park is Deer Lake State Park.

The 2,187.44 acres (9 km^{2}) of land for the park was obtained from a lease from the Florida Board of Education in 1964 and opened in 1968. A separate unit of the park located one mile (1.6 km) west of the main park offers duplex cabins for rent and also has beach access.

== About Grayton Beach ==
Grayton Beach State Park is one of the most popular parks in the state of Florida. Salt marshes, sea oat covered dunes, crystal-white sand, and blue-green waters make up this state park. Western Lake, the second-largest coastal dune lake in the Florida Panhandle, is just one of the many coastal dune lakes that visitors see while driving down Scenic Highway 30A. The park also offers facilities for swimming, fishing, snorkeling, and camping. Grayton Beach provides visitors with a variety of activities. Included within the park is space for recreational vehicle and tent camping as well as 30 cabins accommodating up to six people.

== Recreational activities ==
The park has such amenities as beaches, bicycling, birding, boating, canoeing, fishing, hiking, kayaking, picnicking areas, swimming, wildlife viewing, and full camping facilities.

== History ==
According to the Coastal Heritage Preservation Foundation, in 1885, Army major Charles T. Gray was the first to settle the land now known as Grayton Beach. At the time, the federal government owned most of the land so people had little reason to settle there. The soil was way too sandy to farm, and better timber was located inland. The closest settlement was approximately five miles to the north. This settlement was located at Point Washington on Choctawhatchee Bay. In 1890, Army General William Miller and William Wilson became Gray’s neighbors. They mapped out where the newly found village’s streets and blocks would be constructed. They named the new area Grayton Beach, after Charles T. Gray. In 1913, W. H. Butler and his son Van R. Butler made the day-long trip from DeFuniak Springs to Grayton Beach. Soon thereafter, the Butler family became the community’s leading promoter. In 1926, a major hurricane swept through the area creating Destin’s East Pass. This storm flattened most of the dunes, which left the beach flat. At the beginning of the 1930s, Highway 98 was completed, the Highway 331 bridge was built, and the Intracoastal Waterway was cut through Walton County, which made Grayton Beach and South Walton (SoWal) County much easier for everyone to get to.

== Present day Grayton Beach ==
Florida has kept Grayton Beach small by surrounding it with all park land. The state used land that it owned east of Grayton to establish the Grayton Beach State Recreation Area in 1967. Florida purchased the village’s beach front, dunes, and forest land to the west and north, after they lobbied with residents for years. Grayton beach consistently remains ranked as one of the most beautiful and pristine beaches in the United States.
