= Choctawhatchee Bay =

Bay in the Florida Panhandle

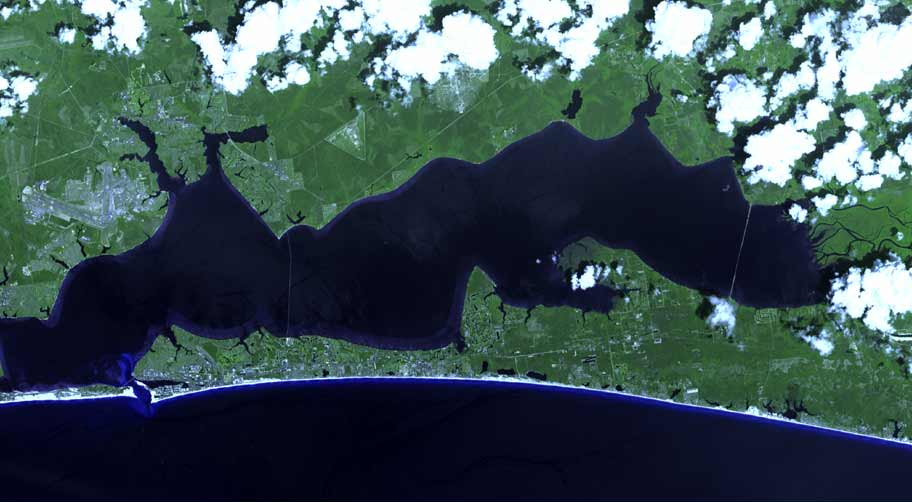
- Satellite image of the Choctawhatchee Bay

- Location within Florida
- Coordinates: 30°26′22″N 86°18′40″W
- Primary inflows: Choctawhatchee River
- Primary outflows: Gulf of Mexico, Santa Rosa Sound
- Catchment area: 5,405 square miles (14,000 km^{2})
- Max. length: 27 miles (43 km)
- Max. width: 6 miles (9.7 km)
- Surface area: 129 square miles (330 km^{2})
- Max. depth: 43 feet (13 m)
- Settlements: Fort Walton Beach, Destin Santa Rosa Beach, Freeport, Niceville, Shalimar, Valparaiso

Choctawhatchee Bay is a bay in the Emerald Coast region of the Florida Panhandle. The bay, located within Okaloosa and Walton counties, is an inlet of the Gulf of Mexico and has a surface area of 334 square kilometres (129 mi^{2}). It connects to Santa Rosa Sound in Fort Walton Beach, Florida to the west and to St. Andrews Bay in Bay County to the east, via the Gulf Intracoastal Waterway. East Pass (also known as Destin Pass) is the only outlet of the bay flowing directly into the Gulf of Mexico, and is crossed by US 98. The Choctawhatchee River flows into the bay, as do several smaller rivers and streams. The tolled Mid-Bay Bridge (SR 293) crosses the bay, connecting the city of Destin to Niceville, Florida. The Judge Clyde B. Wells Bridge (US 331) crosses the eastern part of the bay, connecting Freeport to the coast. The Bay's history dates back to Spanish, French, and English expansion with numerous purposes served throughout, from lumber transportation, military use, to water sports.

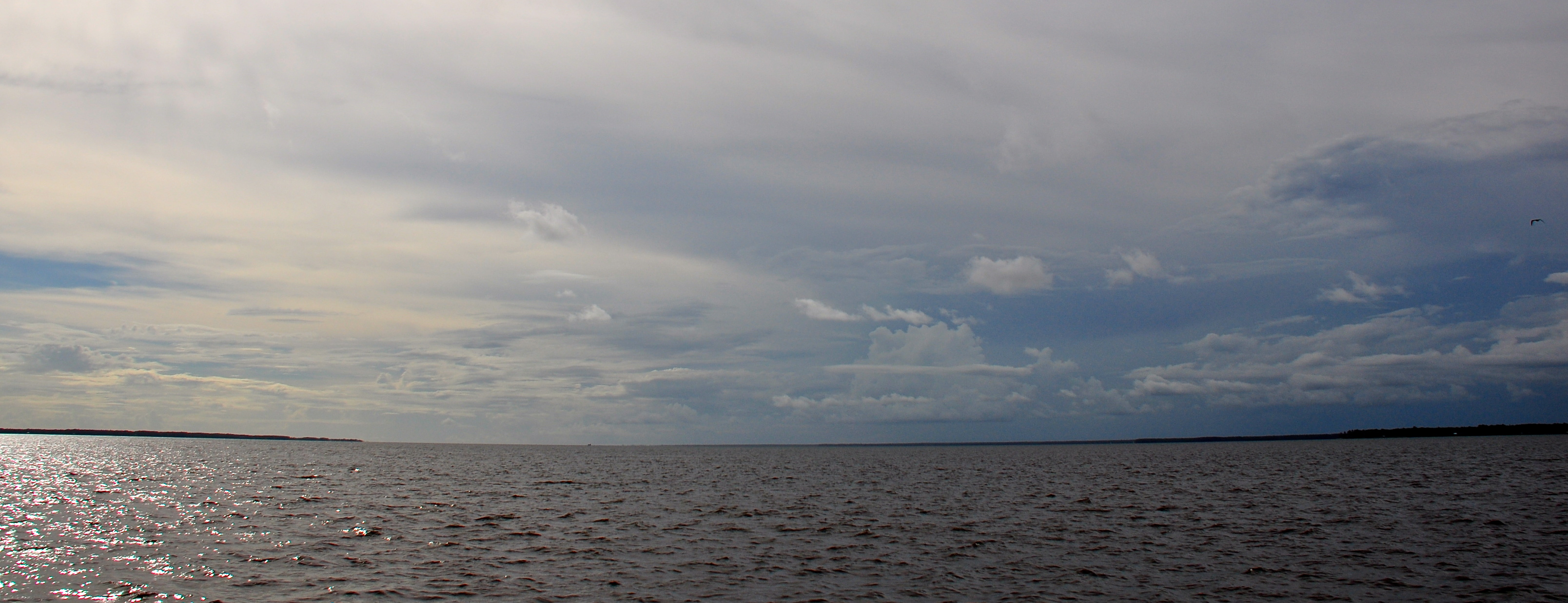
Looking westward onto Choctawhatchee Bay

== History ==
Pensacola Bay and Choctawhatchee Bay (Bahia de Sta. Rosa) in a 1700 Spanish map

The bay was charted by Spanish, French, and English expeditions, The bay appears on some charts as "St. Rose's Bay".

Following the Treaty of Moultrie Creek, small bands of Creeks lived on the shores of Choctawhatchee Bay.

In the late 19th and early 20th centuries, the Choctwhatchee River was used to transport timber and other agricultural goods. Before modern roads were created, the river and bay were the most efficient ways to transport lumber and other agricultural goods.

At the beginning of the 1900s, Choctawhatchee Bay was mainly freshwater and had a small channel to the Gulf of Mexico. During a storm in 1929, the bay's water level increased and threatened homes on the bay with flooding. Locals dug a small trench near Destin to release the water, which quickly eroded into a large channel, creating today's large Destin's Pass or East Pass. The larger channel increased the bay's salinity, significantly changing its ecosystem.

== Military use ==
As noted in a 1993 Eglin AFB report, Test Area D-55 was originally installed in the World War II era by Eglin Air Force Base with "omnidirectional radar corner reflectors" on top to be used as a radar target range. Test Area D-55 is formed by 25 arrays of 2,040 wood pilings placed east of the Clyde B. Wells Bridge. They are located in 8 feet of water and the array extends for 1.2 miles.

== Human Use ==
=== Fishing and Shellfish Harvesting ===
Choctawhatchee Bay supports both commercial and recreational fishing. Species you can find while fishing are red drum, spotted seatrout, sheepshead, Spanish Mackerel, flounder, and mullet. The Bay is also home to oyster beds that are commercially and recreationally harvested as well. Some areas within are part of oyster-reef restoration projects to help sustain the populations.

=== Recreation and Tourism ===
The bay attracts many of its tourists due to the recreational activities available. This includes boating, kayaking, paddleboarding, and swimming. The water in the bay is much calmer compared to the waters of the Gulf of Mexico, making it a presumably safer destination for families and water sports. The bay's environment also supports wildlife observation and fishing.

=== Waterfront Development ===
Shorelines across Choctawhatchee Bay include much residential and tourism infrastructure, particularly near Destin and Santa Rosa Beach. Smaller towns such as Niceville, Valparaiso, and Freeport also have waterfront access to the bay. Numerous private docks, public boat ramps, marinas, and parks can be found along the waterfront of the bay, serving both private and public use.

== Environmental Programs ==
Choctawhatchee Bay is home to local organizations that help maintain good ecological health. These include the Choctawhatchee Basin Alliance (CBA) and the Choctawhatchee Bay Estuary Program (CBEP). These programs initiative's include water-quality monitoring, shoreline and oyster-reef restoration, seagrass restoration, and community education programs.

== Municipalities ==
Several towns and cities are located around the Choctawhatchee Bay:

- Fort Walton Beach
- Destin
- Santa Rosa Beach
- Freeport
- Niceville
- Shalimar
- Valparaiso

== Tributaries ==
Below are a few of the tributary rivers and bayous that feed into the Choctawhatchee Bay.

=== Rivers ===
- Choctawhatchee River
- Mitchell River
- Black Creek

=== Bayous ===
- LaGrange Bayou
- Alaqua Bayou
- Basin Bayou
- Rocky Bayou
- Boggy Bayou
- Cinco Bayou

=== Lakes ===
- Pippin Lake
- Jack Lake
- Lower Memorial Lake
- Bens Lake
- Lake Lorraine
- Lake Vivian
- Lake Clyde
- Lake Earl
