= Harvey Brown =

Harvey Brown may refer to:

- Harvey Brown (officer) (1795–1874), American military officer
- Harvey R. Brown (born 1950), British philosopher
- Harvey E. Brown Jr. (1836–1889), American military officer and army surgeon
- Harvey W. Brown (1883–1956), American labor union leader
