= Israel Vogdes =

American soldier and military educator

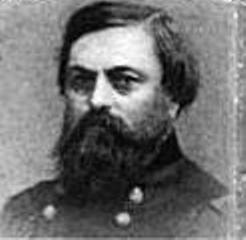
- Israel Vogdes
- Born: August 14, 1816; Chester County, Pennsylvania, U.S.
- Died: December 7, 1889 (aged 73); New York City, U.S.
- Burial place: West Point Cemetery
- Military career
- Allegiance: United States; Union
- Branch: United States Army; Union Army
- Service years: 1837–1881
- Rank: Brigadier General
- Commands: 3rd Division, X Corps
- Conflicts: Seminole Wars; American Civil War; Battle of Santa Rosa Island (POW); Second Battle of Charleston Harbor

Israel Vogdes (August 14, 1816 – December 7, 1889) was a soldier and military educator from Pennsylvania who served as a general in the Union Army during the American Civil War.

== Biography ==
Vogdes was born in Chester County, Pennsylvania, the youngest of five children of Aaron and Ann (Hayman) Vogdes. He was educated in the local schools. He graduated from the United States Military Academy in West Point, New York, in 1837 and was commissioned as a second lieutenant in the 1st U.S. Artillery. He was promoted the following year to first lieutenant, and in 1847 to captain. He served as assistant professor of mathematics at the USMA, from September 4, 1837, to August 30, 1843, and as principal assistant professor from August 30, 1843, until September 15, 1849. Vogdes fought in the Seminole Wars from 1849 to 1850 and again in 1856.

He married Mary Thomas and had three children. When his first wife died, he remarried and had four more offspring. Two of his sons later were officers in the U.S. Army; one served in the Union Army during the Civil War as a lieutenant in the 100th New York Infantry.

Shortly after the start of the Civil War, Captain Vogdes stationed at Fort Monroe. Promoted to major, he was part of an expedition that was sent to Florida to quell the rebellion in that state, but was taken as a prisoner of war at Fort Pickens in October 1861 during the Battle of Santa Rosa Island. After being exchanged in August 1862, he was appointed as a brigadier general of U.S. Volunteers in the Union Army's X Corps on November 29, 1862. Promoted to colonel in the Regular Army on August 1, 1863, he commanded the Federal forces on Folly Island and participated in the Second Battle of Charleston Harbor. Vogdes then commanded forces in the X Corps in the Military District of Florida in early 1864. He finished the war as commander of the defenses of Norfolk and Portsmouth, Virginia.

At the close of the war, he was brevetted as a brigadier general in the Regular Army on April 9, 1865.

After the war, Vogdes returned to the Regular Army's 1st U.S. Artillery. He retired from the service in 1881 with the rank of colonel. Vogdes retired to New York City and died there of an abdominal hemorrhage in 1889 at the age of 73. He was buried at the West Point Cemetery on December 11, 1889.

There are several streets in Philadelphia named in his honor.

== See also ==
- List of American Civil War generals (Union)
