= John K. Jackson =

John King Jackson
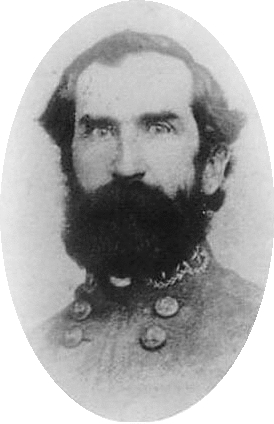
- Born: February 2, 1828; Augusta, Georgia
- Died: February 27, 1866 (aged 38); Milledgeville, Georgia
- Burial place: Augusta's City Cemetery, Augusta, Georgia
- Military career
- Allegiance: United States of America; Confederate States of America
- Branch: Confederate States Army
- Service years: 1861–65
- Rank: Brigadier General
- Conflicts: American Civil War

John King Jackson (February 2, 1828 – February 27, 1866) was an American lawyer and soldier. He served as a Confederate general during the American Civil War, mainly in Florida and the Western Theater of the conflict. Afterward Jackson resumed his law practice until dying from pneumonia a year after the war ended.

== Early life and career ==
John King Jackson was born in 1828 in Augusta, Georgia. He received his education first at Richmond Academy in his home state, and later at the University of South Carolina in Columbia, where he graduated "with honors" in 1846. Jackson then began to study law and was admitted to his state's bar association in 1848, practicing in Augusta until 1861.

In 1849, Jackson married a woman from Columbia County named Virginia L. Hardwick. The couple had three sons together, named Thomas M., William E., and Hardwick. He also was active as an officer in the Georgia State Militia, elected a lieutenant and later a captain. By 1861 was serving as a lieutenant colonel, in command of an Augusta infantry battalion.

== Civil War service ==
When the American Civil War began in 1861, Jackson chose to follow his home state and the Confederate cause. In April he entered the Confederate Army as lieutenant colonel of the 5th Georgia Volunteer Infantry Regiment, and in May was elected its commander and colonel. Jackson's regiment was ordered to Pensacola, Florida, where he also commanded the post at Pensacola that May and June.

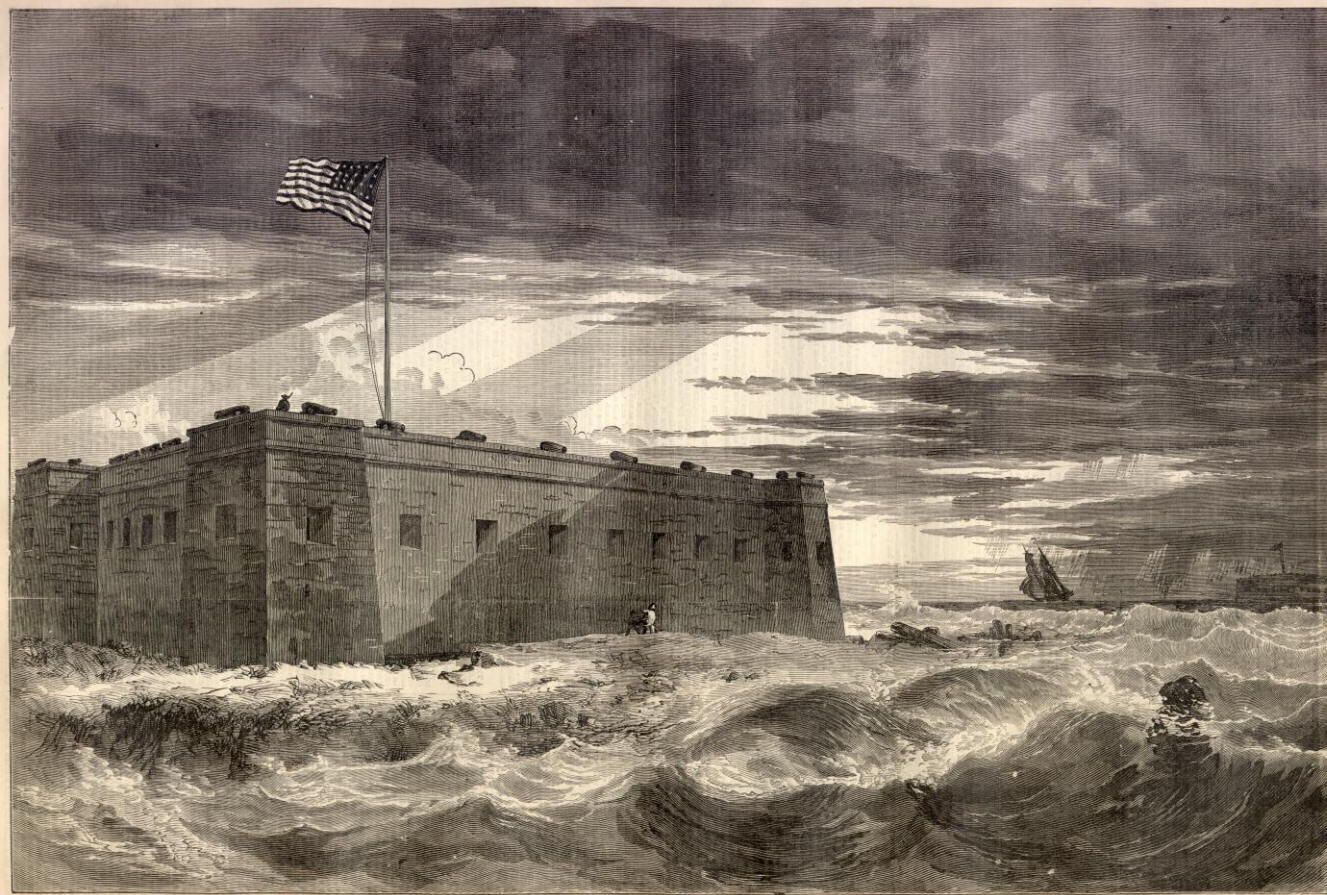
Fort Pickens, located on Santa Rosa Island, Florida

Jackson was in command of one of the three battalions which fought in the Confederate defeat during the Battle of Santa Rosa Island on October 8, 1861. Jackson and his regiment remained in Florida for the rest of 1861. On January 14, 1862, he was promoted to brigadier general, assigned command of a brigade in the Army of Pensacola a week later. In February Jackson was sent to Grand Junction, Tennessee, where he was to organize the Confederate soldiers sent there into brigades on their way to Corinth, Mississippi. Beginning on March 29, he commanded a brigade in the recently created Army of the Mississippi, and led it with distinction during the Battle of Shiloh on April 6–7. During the late evening attack by Maj. Gen. Braxton Bragg on April 6, Jackson's men and another brigade charged a strong Union position upon a ridge. Despite being very low on ammunition, the force made "a brave bayonet attack" which was ultimately unsuccessful.

During the Kentucky Campaign of 1862, Jackson and his brigade were ordered from Knoxville to Bridgeport, Alabama, where they were to guard Confederate communications along the railways bridges from Chattanooga to Murfreesboro. Jackson next saw combat during the Stones River Campaign of late 1862. On December 25 Bragg, by now the army's commander, ordered Jackson to leave the bare minimum of his command to protect the rail bridges and join the main force gathering at Murfreesboro. Sent to Lt. Gen. Leonidas Polk for orders, Jackson and his men participated in the Battle of Stones River from December 31 to January 2, 1863. An account of Jackson's participation follows:

...his brigade was posted first on the right as part of the reserve and afterward was ordered to report to General Polk, at Duck river, near the Cowan house. General Polk ordered him into the fight at Cowan's house, where Withers' division had been repulsed. As Breckinridge's command, composed of three brigades, was coming up in the rear, General Jackson asked if it would not be better to wait until Breckinridge was in line, as the enemy was very strong; but General Polk replied, 'Jackson, there's the enemy, go in.' He went in, accordingly, and his brigade was cut to pieces.

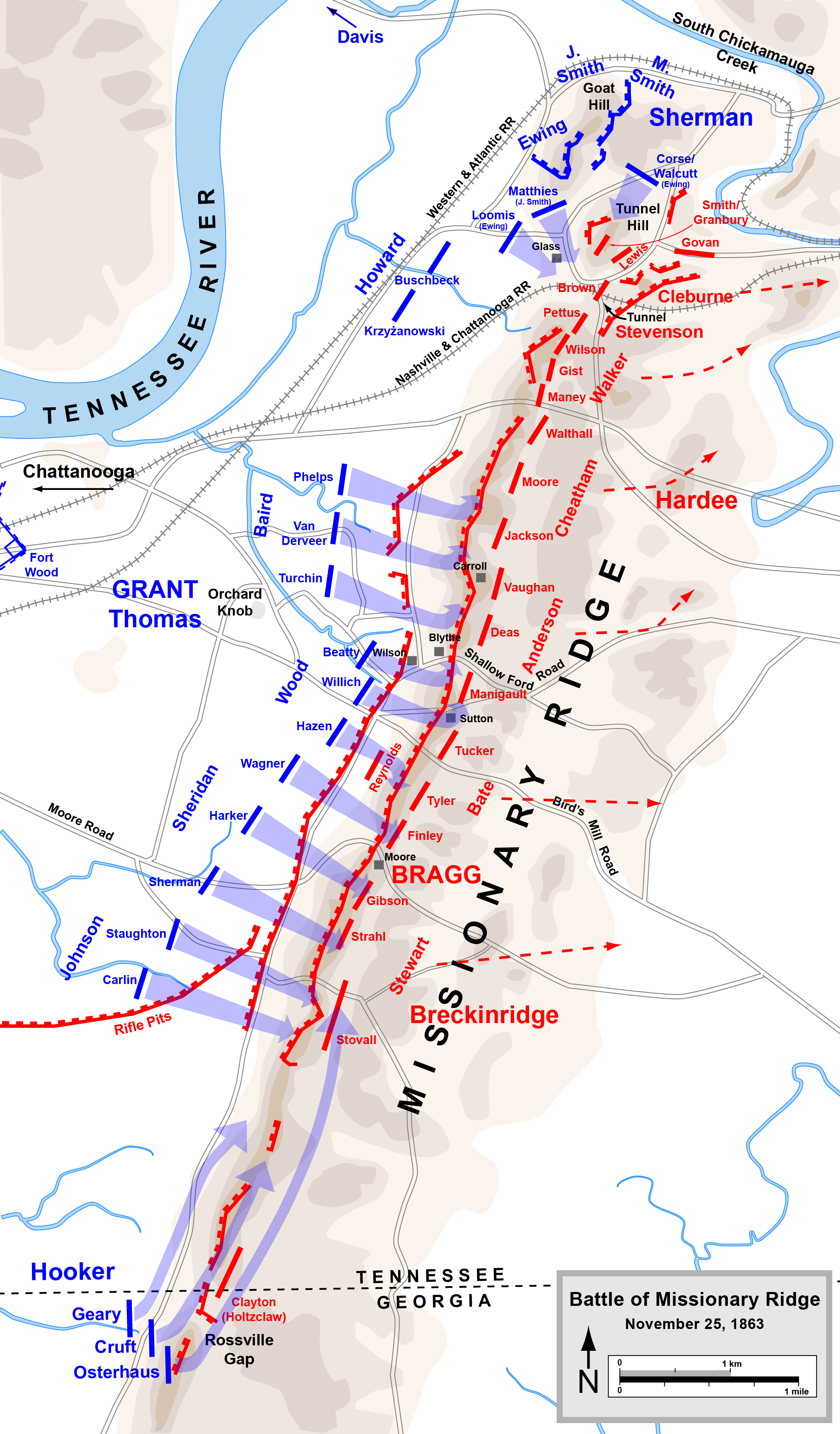
Battle of Missionary Ridge

Following the fight at Stones River, Jackson and his men were sent back to Bridgeport and then again to Chattanooga, ordered to defend railroad communications from Atlanta to Tullahoma. From February 23 to July 25 he commanded the District of Tennessee of the Confederate Department No. 2. When Bragg's army fell back on that city, Jackson's brigade was assigned to Major General Benjamin F. Cheatham's division of Lieutenant General Leonidas Polk's corps. He fought with distinction during the Battle of Chickamauga on September 19–20, 1863, where one of his regiments, the 5th Georgia, "lost sixty-one per cent in that battle, the second heaviest loss of all the regiments engaged." He participated in the Chattanooga campaign that October and November, most notably in the Battle of Missionary Ridge, where his brigade and that of Brig Gen. John C. Moore greatly slowed the Union breakthrough on November 25.

While the Army of Tennessee fell back to Dalton, Georgia, Jackson and his brigade were transferred to Maj. Gen. William H. T. Walker's division on February 20, 1864. He participated in the Atlanta campaign until July 3, when he was separated from the Army of Tennessee. Jackson and two of his regiments (5th & 47th Georgia) were ordered to Charleston, South Carolina, to report to Maj. Gen. Samuel Jones. There Jones gave him orders to proceed to Lake City, Florida, and relieve Brig. Gen. James P. Anderson, in charge of the District of Florida in the Confederate Department of South Carolina, Georgia, & Florida. Jackson commanded at Florida from August 30 to September 29, 1864.

During Sherman's March to the Sea in late 1864, Jackson and his command were then sent to Savannah, Georgia, and participated in the siege of Savannah. He was given command of the center line in the Confederate defenses, which were evacuated when the city was abandoned that December. Following the actions at Savannah, Jackson was sent to Branchville, South Carolina, where he was to establish military depots as the quartermaster of the Army of Tennessee. He then went to Cheraw, next to Goldsboro, North Carolina, and finally his home town of Augusta, all for the same purpose. Jackson was in this role when Gen. Joseph E. Johnston surrendered his forces on April 26, 1865, which included the Army of Tennessee. He was paroled from Augusta on May 17 and returned to his civilian life.

== Postbellum career and death ==
After the American Civil War ended in 1865, Jackson resumed his career as a lawyer in Augusta, Georgia. Several of the state's banks hired Jackson to obtain financial relief from the Georgia General Assembly on behalf of their stockholders, many of whom were returning Confederate officers. He was on this mission when he was stricken with pneumonia while in Milledgeville, located in Baldwin County, Georgia. Jackson died in early 1866, a few weeks after his 38th birthday, and was buried in Augusta's City Cemetery.

== See also ==
- List of American Civil War generals (Confederate)
