= 10th Mississippi Infantry Regiment =

Infantry regiment of the Confederate States Army

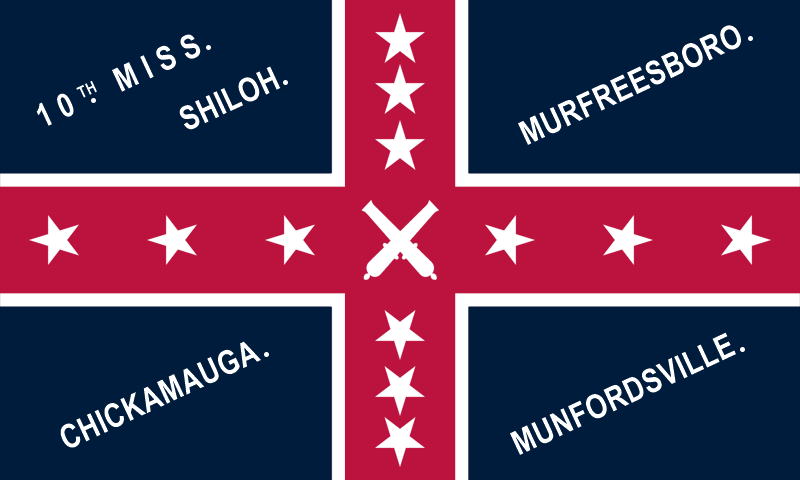
- A Polk's Corps-style Battle Flag of the 10th Mississippi
- Active: 1861-1865
- Country: Confederate States
- Allegiance: Mississippi
- Branch: Army
- Role: Infantry
- Equipment: Muskets
- Engagements: American Civil War: Battle of Santa Rosa Island; Battle of Shiloh; Siege of Corinth; Kentucky Campaign; Battle of Stones River; Battle of Chickamauga; Battle of Missionary Ridge; Atlanta campaign; Franklin-Nashville Campaign; Carolinas campaign

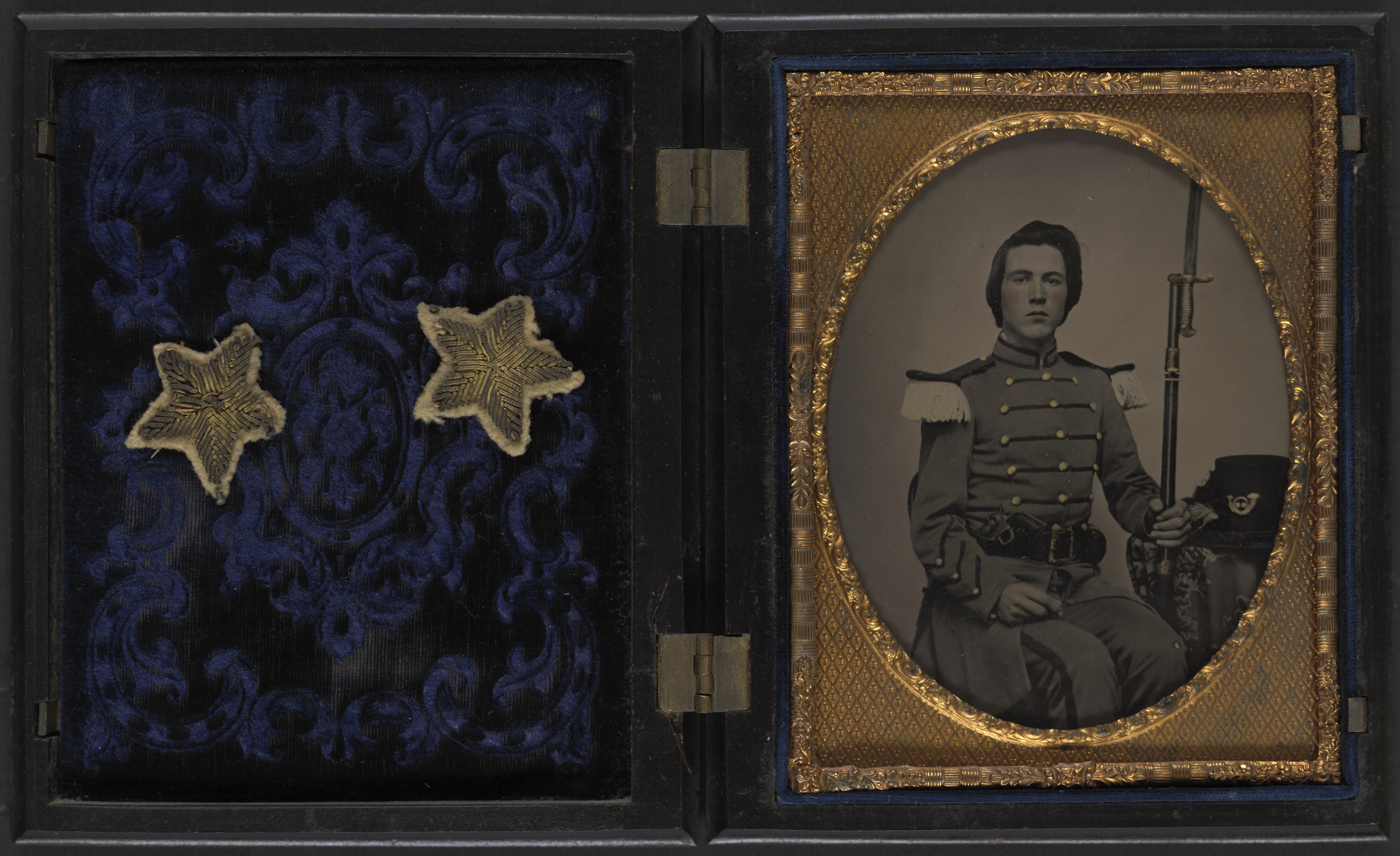
Major Thomas B. Beall of Company I, 10th Mississippi Infantry Regiment

The 10th Mississippi Infantry Regiment was a regiment of infantry in the Confederate States Army during the American Civil War. It fought in several campaigns and battles in the Western Theater.

== "Old" 10th Mississippi ==
The 10th Mississippi Infantry was organized in March 1861 with an original enrollment of 841 officers and men for a term of one year. Among the officers was future Confederate general Joseph R. Davis, a nephew of President Jefferson Davis. The original companies, under the command of Col. Seaburne M. Phillips, were:

- Company A - Mississippi Rifles (Hinds County)
- Company B - Ben Bullard Rifles (Itawamba County)
- Company C - Port Gibson Riflemen, aka Port Gibson Rifles (Claiborne County)
- Company D - Lowndes Southrons (Lowndes County)
- Company E - Southern Avengers (Lowndes County)
- Company F - Hill City Cadets (Warren County)
- Company G - Rankin Rifles (Rankin County)
- Company H - Bahala Rifles (Copiah County)
- Company I - Madison Rifles (Madison County)
- Company K - Yazoo Minute Rifles (Yazoo County)

The troops assembled in Mobile, Alabama, and were transported to Pensacola, Florida, for garrison duty there to help man the coastal defenses. They encamped near Fort Barrancas, opposite Fort Pickens and Santa Rosa Island, both held by Union troops. Several companies engaged in building new fortifications or strengthening existing ones, as well as supporting the artillery crews during periodic bombardments over four months. Colonel Phillips and scores of other men died of disease while stationed near Pensacola. The depleted regiment fought in the Battle of Santa Rosa Island in October 1861.

In February 1862, the regiment was sent back to Mississippi, where it was brigaded with other Mississippi troops under the overall command of Col. James R. Chalmers. The term of enlistment expired in March.

== "New" 10th Mississippi ==
The regiment was reorganized at Corinth on March 15, 1862, for a term of two years. The new companies were:

- Company A - Horn Lake Volunteers [formerly Co. E, 9th MS Infantry] (DeSoto County)
- Company B - Natchez Southrons [also listed as Co. C] (Adams County)
- Company C - Ben Bullard Rifles [also listed as Co. D] (Itawamba County)
- Company D - Mississippi Rifles [also listed as Co. G] (Hinds County)
- Company E - Lowndes Southrons (Lowndes County)
- Company F - Port Gibson Rifleman (Claiborne County)
- Company G - Fulton Guards [also listed as Co. B] (Itawamba County)
- Company H - Rankin Rifles [also listed as Co. A] (Rankin County)
- Company I - Bahala Rifles (Copiah County)
- Company K - Beauregard Relief (Tippah County)
- Company L - Capt. Finley's Company
- Company M - Capt. Dobson's Company
- Company N - Capt. Bell's Company
- Company O - Capt. Inge's Company
- Company P - Capt. Betts’ Company

In April, the new 10th, now under the command of Col. Robert A. Smith and numbering only 360 men, fought in the Battle of Shiloh in West Tennessee. It later participated in Braxton Bragg's Kentucky Campaign and suffered significant casualties at the Battle of Munfordville, including Colonel Smith. Chalmers' Brigade, including the 10th Mississippi, was part in the advance toward Louisville in September. Under Col. James Barr Jr., the 10th fought in the Battle of Perryville before retreating with Bragg's beaten army across the Cumberland Gap on October 20. Marching through Tennessee, the regiment camped near Murfreesboro, Tennessee, in November. It fought in the subsequent Battle of Stones River in late December and early January 1863.

The 10th again was part of a general Confederate retreat, finally encamping near Tullahoma, Tennessee, until July 1863 when it advanced to Chattanooga and then on to Bridgeport, Alabama. It subsequently participated in the Chickamauga Campaign in September and in the attack on Missionary Ridge at Chattanooga in November before retreating to winter quarters near Dalton, Georgia.

In the spring and summer of 1864, the 10th participated in the Atlanta campaign. Colonel Barr was mortally wounded in the Battle of Marietta and replaced by James M. Walker. The survivors were part of the Franklin-Nashville Campaign in November before wintering near Meridian, Mississippi. In the spring of 1865, the consolidated regiment took part in the Carolinas campaign before surrendering with the army of Joseph E. Johnston at Bennett Place in North Carolina in April.

== Colonels ==
- Seaborn M. Phillips, died at Pensacola
- Robert A. Smith, killed at Munfordville
- James Barr Jr., died in Georgia
- James M. Walker, resigned

== See also ==
- List of Mississippi Civil War Confederate units
