= Battle of Santa Rosa Island =

1861 battle of the American Civil War

Coordinates: 30.3242°N 87.2817°W

- Part of the American Civil War
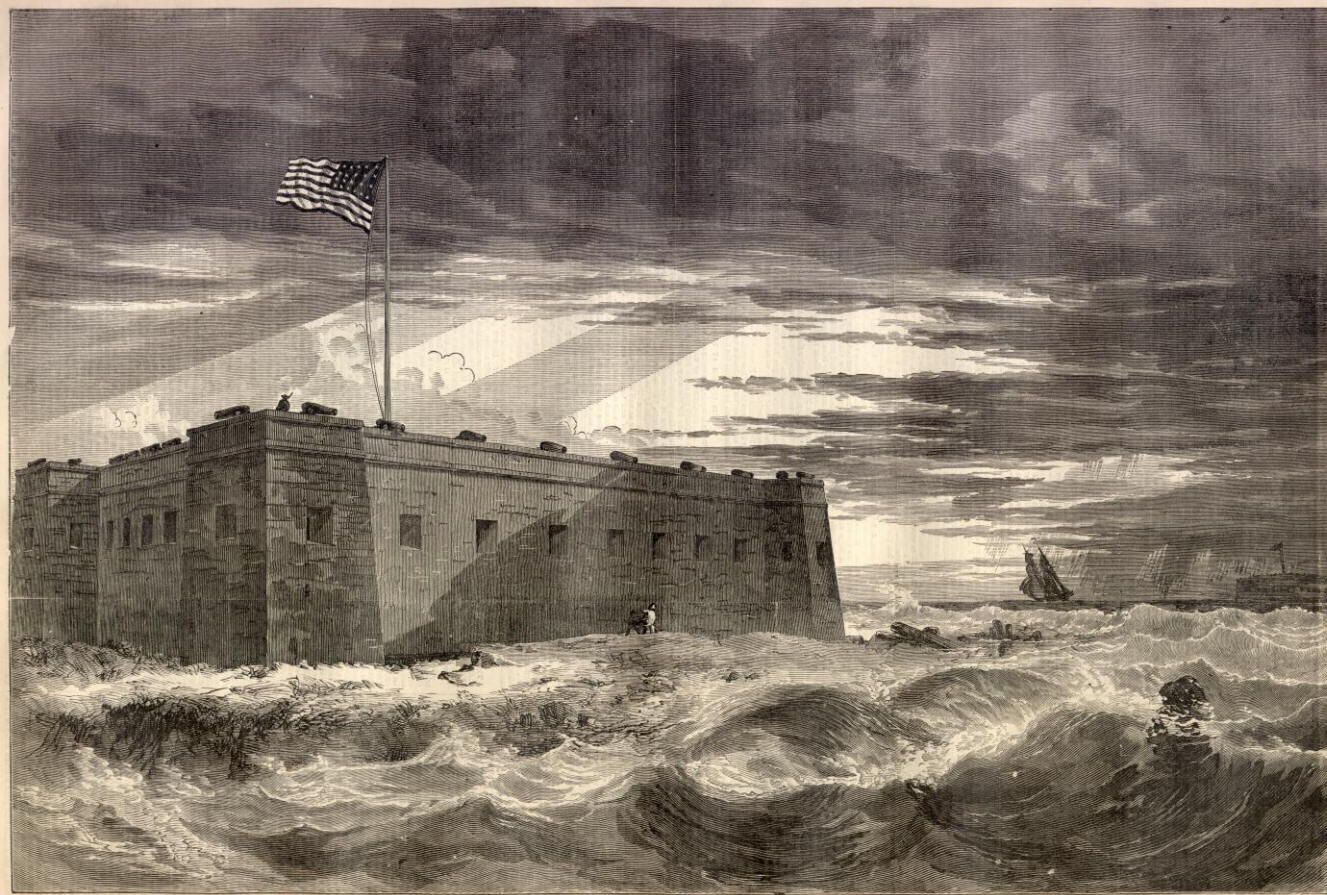
- Fort Pickens, the site of the Battle of Santa Rosa Island
Date	October 9, 1861
Location	Santa Rosa Island (Florida)
Result	Union victory

Belligerents
United States (Union)	(Confederate States of America) Confederacy

Commanders and leaders
Israel Vodges	Richard H. Anderson

Strength
600	1,200

Casualties and losses
67 total 14 killed 29 wounded 24 captured or missing	87 total 30–40 killed

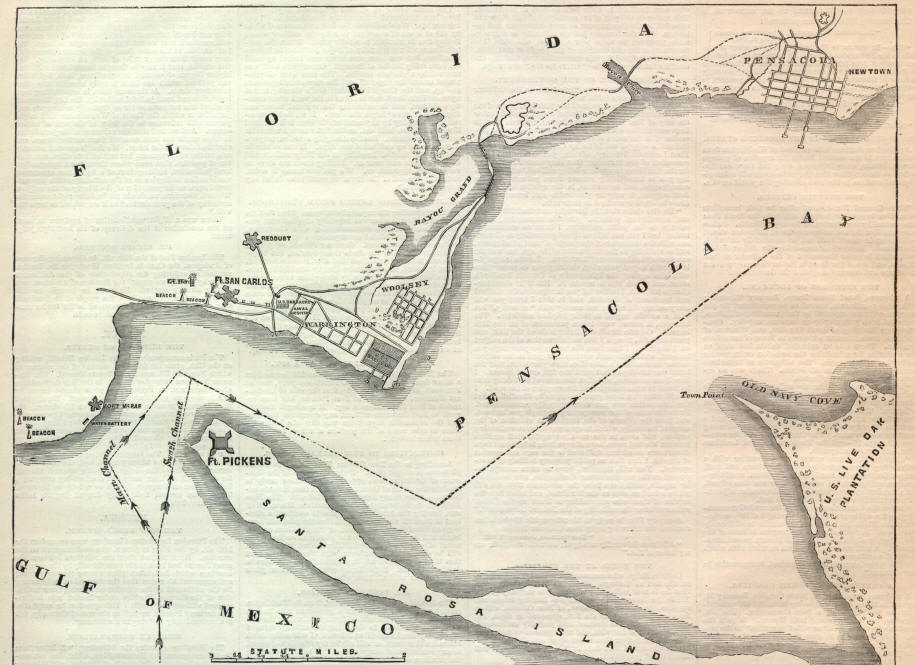
The harbor of Pensacola, Florida in 1861.

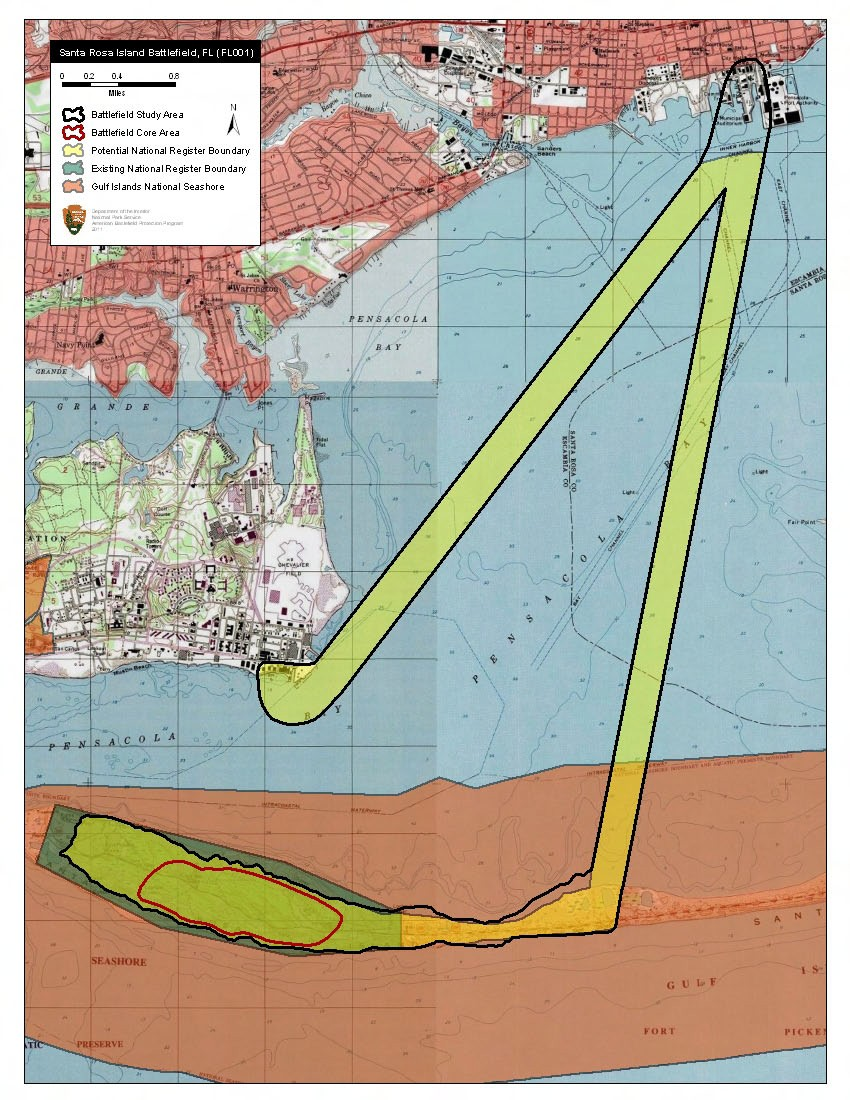
Map of Santa Rosa Island Battlefield core and study areas by the American Battlefield Protection Program.

The Battle of Santa Rosa Island (October 9, 1861) was an unsuccessful Confederate attempt to take Union-held Fort Pickens on Santa Rosa Island, Florida.

== Background ==
Santa Rosa Island is a 40-mile barrier island in the U.S. state of Florida, thirty miles from the Alabama state border. At the western end stands Fort Pickens, which in the first week of January 1861 had a garrison of only one company, Company G of the 1st Regiment, US Artillery. The fort was commanded by Major John H. Winder, a secessionist who would have likely turned the fort over to the rebel government. Instead, Winder and his senior lieutenant were absent from the fort and so the garrison was commanded by Lieutenant Adam J. Slemmer. Slemmer immediately began to collect armaments from the nearby military posts and prepared to hold out against the growing rebellion. (Note: Florida seceded on January 10, 1861)

By the fall of 1861, it was reinforced by more men from the 1st, as well as the 2nd and 5th U. S. artillery, and the 3rd U.S. Infantry, under command of Col. Harvey Brown, of the 5th artillery. The 6th New York Volunteer Infantry, commanded by Col. William Wilson, was encamped outside the fort, a short distance east of it.

== Battle ==
After midnight on October 9, Brig. Gen. Richard Anderson crossed from the mainland to Santa Rosa Island with 1,200 men in two small steamers to surprise the Union troops at Camp Brown and if possible capture Fort Pickens. He landed on the north beach about four miles east of Fort Pickens and divided his command into three columns. After proceeding about three miles, the Confederates surprised the 6th Regiment, New York Volunteers, in Camp Brown and routed the regiment. Gen. Anderson then adopted a defensive stance to entice the Federals to leave the fort and attack. Receiving reinforcements, Col. Harvey Brown sallied against the Confederates, who reembarked and returned to the mainland.

The Union loss was 14 killed, 29 wounded and 24 captured or missing. General Braxton Bragg and Lieutenant Hamel, commanding the Confederate forces at Pensacola, reported their loss as "30 or 40 killed and wounded," but an undocumented Confederate newspaper, found by Lieut. Seeley a few days after the occurrence, gave the total casualties as 175. This claim was likely an exaggeration. Maj. Israel Vogdes, of the 1st artillery, was captured, and on the Confederate side Gen. Anderson was severely wounded. The camp of the 6th N.Y., which was the main objective of the raid, was largely destroyed, meaning the raid could be deemed a success, but were ultimately repulsed off the island and accepted defeat. on November 22 and 23, the US troops across the bay fired 5,000 devastating rounds of artillery, destroying Fort McRee and Pensacola Navy Yard.

Fort Pickens and the battle site are preserved within the Gulf Islands National Seashore.

== Order of battle ==
=== Union Forces ===
Department of Florida: Col. Harvey Brown

- 6th New York Zouave Infantry, Col. William Wilson
  - Company C – Captain R. H. Hazeltine
  - Company D – Captain Duffy
  - Company F – Lieutenant Jacob Silloway
  - Company H – Captain Charles E. Heuberer
  - Company K – Captain H.L. Hoelzle
- Vodges' Command – Major Israel Vogdes (c), Capt. John McL. Hildt
  - Company A, 1st Artillery – Lieutenant Frank E. Taylor
  - Company E, 3rd Infantry – Captain John McL. Hildt
  - Company G, 6th New York Zouave Infantry – Captain James H. Dobie
- Arnold’s Command – Major Lewis Golding Arnold
  - Company C, 3rd Infantry – Lieutenant Alexander Shipley
  - Company H, 2nd Artillery – Captain James M. Robertson

=== Confederate Forces ===
Brig. Gen. Richard Heron Anderson

- Demolition Team – Lieutenant James H. Hallonquist
- 1st Battalion – Colonel James R. Chalmers

Detachment, 10th Mississippi Infantry
Detachment, 1st Alabama Infantry

- 2nd Battalion – Colonel J. Patton Anderson

3 Companies, 7th Alabama Infantry
2 Companies, 1st Louisiana Infantry (Regulars)
2 Companies, 1st Florida Infantry

- 3rd Battalion – Colonel John K. Jackson

Detachment, 5th Georgia Infantry
Detachment, Georgia Infantry Battalion

- Artillery

Homer’s Artillery Company – Lieutenant Hollonquist

- Confederate Naval Forces

CSS Neaffie

== Aftermath ==
New River County, Florida was renamed Bradford County in December 1861 after Confederate Captain Richard Bradford who was killed in the battle, and was the first officer from Florida killed during the Civil War.

== See also ==
- History of Pensacola, Florida
- The Library of Congress Prints and Photographs Division (The Battle of Santa Rosa Island)

== Citations ==
=== References ===
- Bearss, Edwin S. (October 1957). "Civil War Operations in and around Pensacola". Florida Historical Quarterly. 36 (2): 125–165. ISSN 0015-4113. JSTOR 30139783.
- Morris, Gouverneur (1891). The History of a Volunteer Regiment: Being a Succinct Account of the Organization, Services and Adventures of the Sixth Regiment New York Volunteers. New York: Veteran Volunteer Publishing Company. pp. 57–65.
- Santa Rosa Island – A History
- CWSAC Report Update and Resurvey: Individual Battlefield Profiles
