= Joseph R. Davis =

American military officer

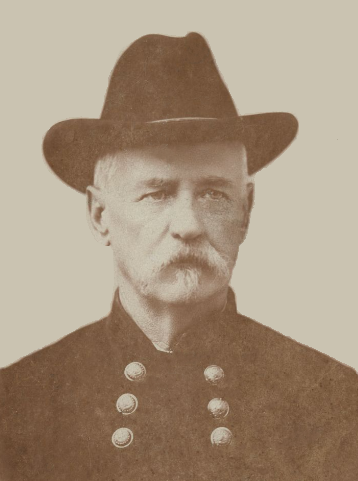
- Official portrait, c. 1888
- Born: Joseph Robert Davis; January 12, 1825; Louisiana, U.S.
- Died: September 15, 1896 (aged 71); Biloxi, Mississippi, U.S.
- Burial place: Biloxi Cemetery, Biloxi, Mississippi, U.S. 30°23′52.1″N 88°54′27.2″W
- Education: Miami University (BA)
- Spouses: Frances H. D. Peyton (m. 1842; div. 1878); Margaret C. Green (m. 1879)
- Children: 3
- Relatives: Jefferson Davis (uncle)
- Military career
- Allegiance: Confederate States; United States
- Branch: Confederate States Army; Mississippi National Guard
- Service years: 1861–1865 (C.S.); 1888–1895 (Miss.)
- Rank: Brigadier-General (C.S.); Major-General (Miss.)
- Commands: Company I, 10th Mississippi Infantry Regiment (1861); Davis' Brigade (1862–1865); Mississippi National Guard (1888–1895)
- Battles: American Civil War; Siege of Suffolk; Gettysburg campaign (WIA); Wilderness Campaign; Siege of Petersburg; Appomattox Campaign (POW)

Major-General Joseph Robert Davis (January 12, 1825 – September 15, 1896) was an American politician and lawyer who served as the commanding general of the Mississippi National Guard from 1888 to 1895. During the American Civil War, he served as aide-de-camp to the President of the Confederate States and commanded a brigade in the Army of Northern Virginia. He is best known for his role at Gettysburg. A member of the Democratic Party, he represented Madison and Scott counties in the Mississippi Senate from 1860 to 1861.

== Early life and education ==
Joseph Robert Davis was born on January 12, 1825, in Louisiana, to Isaac and Susan (née Hartley) Davis, who were of Welsh and Irish origin, respectively. He attended Miami University. Davis engaged in private law practice in Madison County, Mississippi until 1860, when he was elected to the state senate.

== American Civil War ==
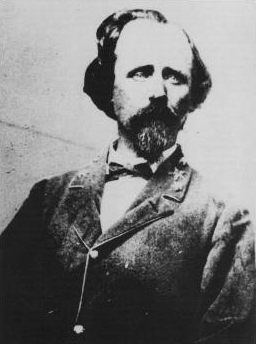
Davis as an aide-de-camp

Entering the Confederate service as Captain of Militia from Madison County, Davis had no formal military training. He was soon made Lieutenant-Colonel of the 10th Mississippi Infantry, after which he served on the personal staff of his uncle, President Jefferson Davis, in Richmond, Virginia, as an aide-de-camp with the rank of Colonel of Cavalry. Commissioned a brigadier-general for the provisional army of the Confederate States to rank from September 15, 1862, and confirmed by the Confederate States Senate only after charges of nepotism were freely aired and his nomination once rejected, he was assigned a brigade in Heth's Division, 3d (Hill's) Corps, Army of Northern Virginia, which he led through some of the most bitter battles of the war. He fought at Gettysburg (where his brigade suffered heavily in the railroad cut on the first day of the battle and participated in Pickett's Charge on the third day), in the Wilderness Campaign, and at the Siege of Petersburg.

== Later life ==
Paroled at Appomattox Court-House on April 9, 1865, Davis returned to Mississippi. After the war he resided in Harrison County, his home most of the time being at Biloxi. He died on September 15, 1896, and is buried at Biloxi Cemetery.

== Personal life ==
Davis was married in 1848 to Frances H. D. Peyton, and secondly, in 1870, to Margaret C. Green. He had two daughters.

== Dates of rank ==
| Rank | Date | Service |
|---|---|---|
| Captain | October 1, 1860 | Mississippi Volunteers |
| Lieutenant-Colonel | April 12, 1861 | Confederate States Army |
| Colonel | August 31, 1861 | Confederate States Army |
| Brigadier-General | September 15, 1862 | Confederate States Army |
| Major-General | April 21, 1888 | Mississippi National Guard |

== See also ==
- List of Confederate States Army generals
- List of Miami University people

== Notes ==
Military offices
| Preceded by Major-General B. S. Ricks | Commanding General of the Mississippi National Guard; 1888–1895 | Succeeded by Major-General J. S. Billups |
