= 6th New York Infantry Regiment =

- New York state flag
- Active: May 25, 1861, to June 25, 1863
- Country: United States
- Allegiance: Union
- Branch: Infantry
- Engagements: American Civil War

Commanders
- Notable commanders: Col. William Wilson

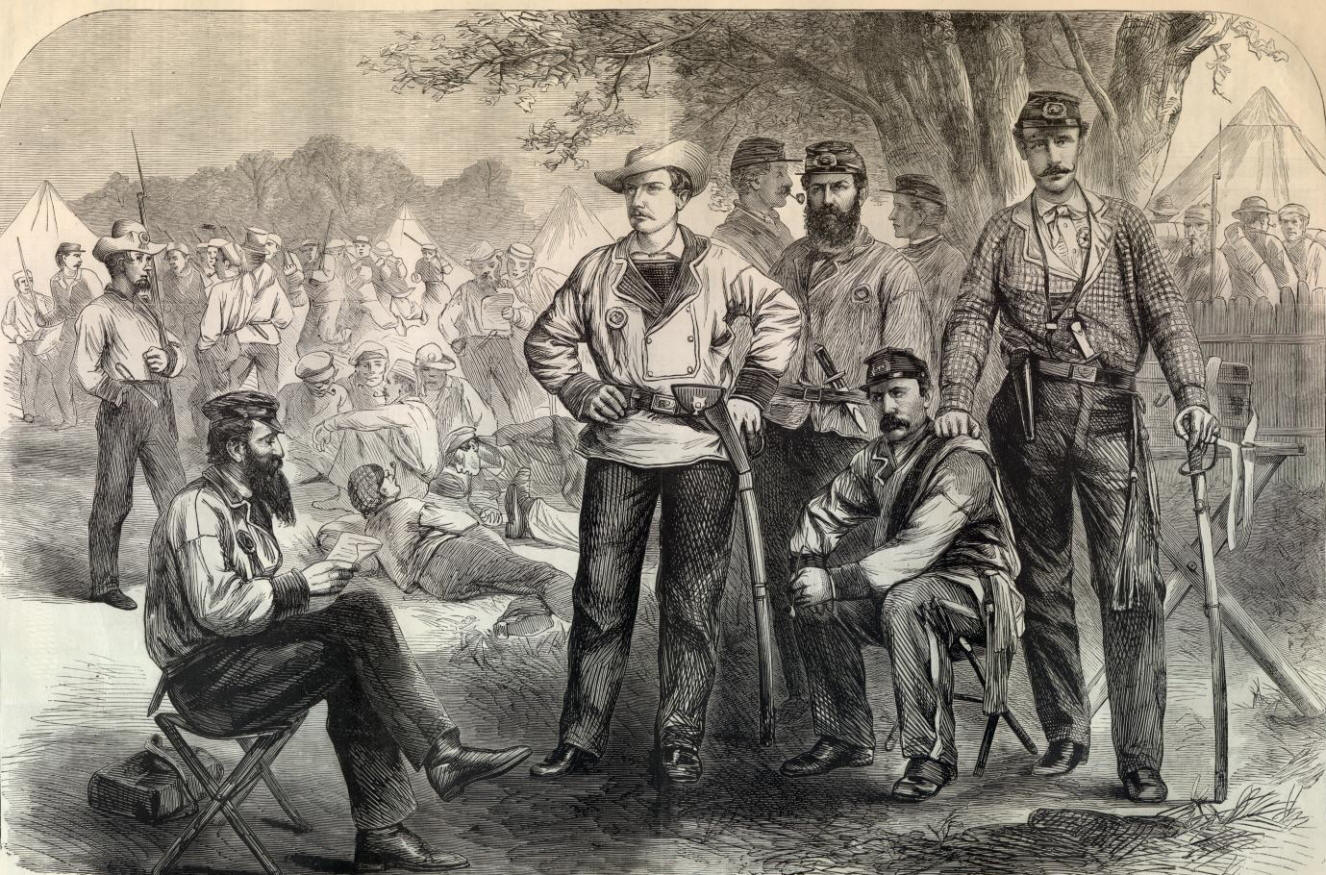
Colonel William Wilson and his staff, May 1861

The 6th New York Infantry Regiment, also called "Wilson's Zouaves", was a unit of the Union Army during the American Civil War. The first five companies, A, B, C, D and E, were organized in New York City on April 30, 1861. The next five companies, F, G, H, I, and K, were added May 25, 1861.

== Service History ==
=== Organization ===
The 6th New York Infantry was officially organized into the Union army on May 25, 1861 in New York City. The regiment had its main headquarters at Tammany Hall, with other secondary headquarters around the city. There were reportedly 861 men at the initial mustering. While newspapers at the time ran with stories that the regiment was made up of thieves and gang members, this was likely exaggerated, if not outright false.

During the mustering, the unit's Colonel and namesake, William Wilson, denounced the recent violence in Baltimore amidst chants of "Death to the Plug Uglies". (Note: The Plug Uglies were a nativist gang who likely participated in the 1861 Baltimore riot where a Union regiment was attacked while marching through the city.) One company, Company K, was made up almost entirely of German or German-Americans. The other companies were composed of Americans, German-Americans, and Irish-Americans. The men were known to carry a seven inch blade "between a sort of bowie knife and butcher knife in shape".

Instead of fighting as a concentrated regiment, the unit was split off for special duties or else fought as individual infantry and heavy artillery companies.

Through the war, the unit was attached to the following districts or departments:

- Santa Rosa Island, District of Florida, Department of the South, June 1861 to May 1862.
- Arnold's Brigade, District of Pensacola, Florida, Department of the South, to September 1862. *Wilson's Brigade, District of West Florida, Department of the Gulf, to November 1862.
- Grover's Division, Department of the Gulf, to January 1863.
- 1st Brigade, 4th Division, 19th Army Corps, Dept. of the Gulf, to June 1863.

=== Santa Rosa Campaign ===
On June 15 the regiment left New York state and arrived at Santa Rosa Island, Florida by June 23, 1861 to reinforce the garrison of Fort Pickens. By this time, the garrison had already defended the fort from capture by Confederate troops.

Around the same time, the summer of 1861, Companies B and E were sent to Fort Jefferson in the Dry Tortugas and Company A was ordered to Key West. In September, Company G was also sent away from the regiment, being deployed to garrison Battery Lincoln on Santa Rosa Island.

On October 8, 1861, Fort Pickens was attacked by a Confederate force led by Gen. Richard H. Anderson in what became known as the Battle of Santa Rosa Island. Because so many of the regiment's companies were off on special assignment, there were only 5 companies (fourteen officers and 220 infantrymen) remaining of the 6th at Fort Pickens for the attack. After an initial skirmish with the enemy, the men of the 6th, who had been posted outside the fort, conducted an orderly retreat into the defenses and helped hold the fortification until the Confederates abandoned their attack.

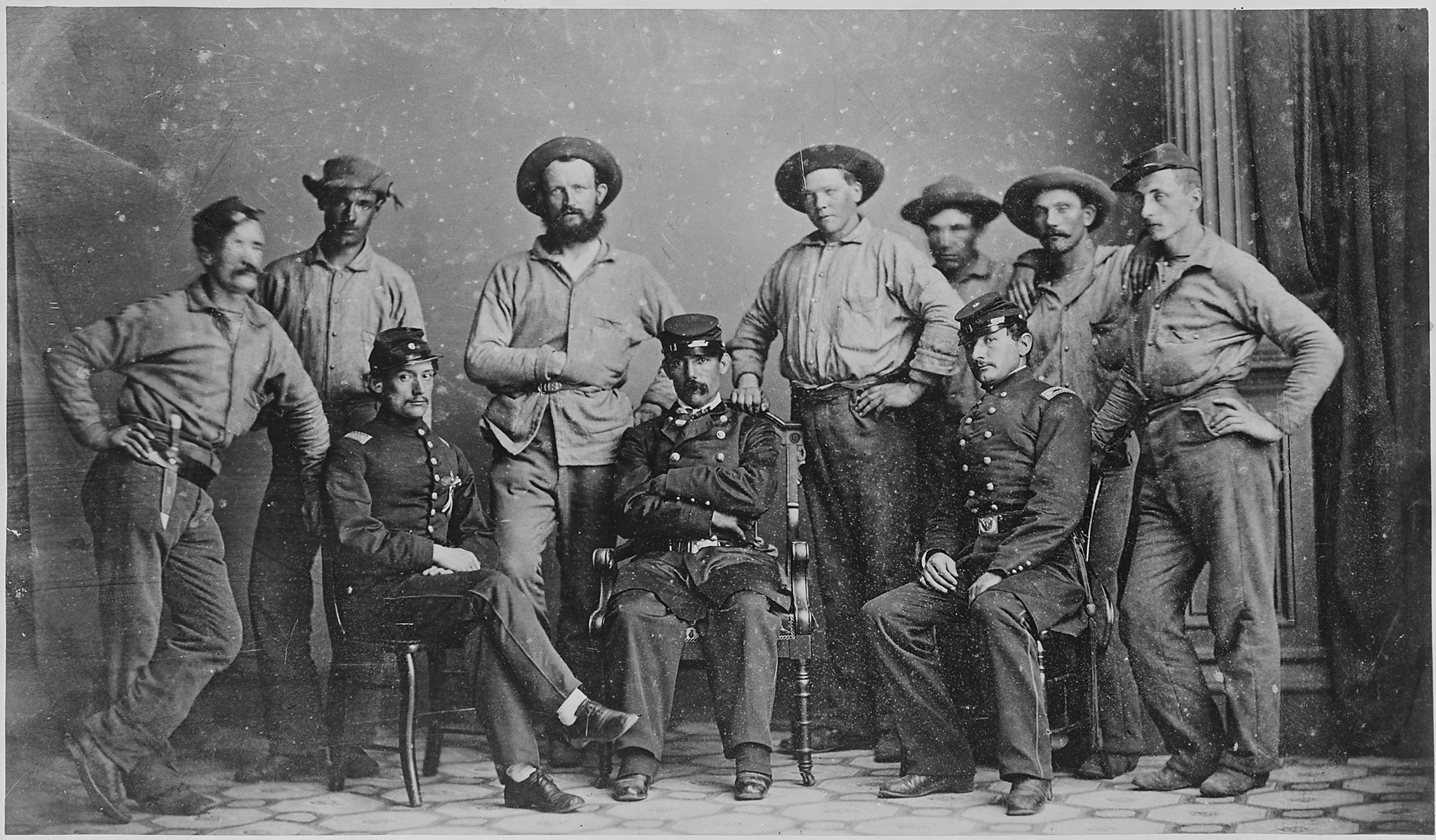
6th Regt. N.Y. Volunteer Inf. Col. Wilson's Zouaves - NARA - 528520

== Engagements ==
- October 9, 1861 – against Confederate forces led by Gen. Richard H. Anderson in the Battle of Santa Rosa Island
- November 22–23 – against Confederate works at Pensacola
- January 1, 1862 – bombardment of Fort McRae and Fort Barrancas
- March 27–31, 1862 – reconnaissance on Santa Rosa Island
- May 9 through November 1862 - Co. "K" on duty at Pensacola
- June 14-14 – Companies B, C E and H on expedition to Milton, Florida
- August 7–10 – reconnaissance from Pensacola to Bagdad, Florida and Milton, Florida
- November 1862 – companies A and E ordered to New Orleans, Louisiana
- December 17–March 13, 1863 – occupation of Baton Rouge, Louisiana
- March 13–27, 1863 – operations at the Siege of Port Hudson
- March 28, 1863 – moved to Donaldsonville, Louisiana
- April 9–May 14, 1863 – operations in Western Louisiana
- April 11–20 – Teche Campaign
- April 12–13 – Fort Bisland
- April 13 – Porter's and McWilliams' Plantations at Indian Bend, Louisiana
- April 14 – Battle of Irish Bend
- April 17 – Battle of Vermilion Bayou
- April 20 – Opelousas, Louisiana
- May 11, 1863 – moved to Barre Landing then May 21–26, 1863, by trains to Berwick, Louisiana
- May 25, 1863 – action at Franklin and Centreville

== Mustered out ==
The 6th was ordered back to New York City for muster out, mustered out at New York City June 25, 1863, expiration of term.

== See also ==
- List of New York Civil War regiments
