= Harvey E. Brown Jr. =

American military officer and surgeon

- Born: 1840; Governors Island, New York Harbor, New York, U.S.
- Died: August 20, 1889 (aged 49); Jackson Barracks near New Orleans, Louisiana, U.S.
- Burial place: Chalmette National Cemetery
- Relatives: Harvey Brown
- Military career
- Allegiance: United States of America; Union
- Branch: Army Medical Department
- Service years: 1861–1889
- Rank: Major
- Unit: 17th New York Volunteers
- Conflicts: American Civil War
- Other work: Military historian

Dr. Harvey E. Brown Jr. (1840 – August 20, 1889) was an American military officer and army surgeon. The son of Major General Harvey Brown, he entered the U.S. Army shortly after graduation from the University of New York and had a distinguished career as an army surgeon with the 17th New York Volunteers, part of the famed "Excelsior Brigade", under General Daniel Sickles during the American Civil War. He was surgeon of volunteers for three years before transferring to the Regular Army on April 13, 1863.

He also saw extensive service during several major yellow fever epidemics in the southeastern United States during Reconstruction and later wrote an important research report on the subject, "More Efficient System of Quarantine on the Southern and Gulf Coasts", in 1873. He was considered one of the foremost experts in the field during his 25-year career. A member of the Surgeon General's office in later years, he became a military historian detailing the history of the U.S. Army Medical Department in "The Medical Department of the United States Army from 1775 to 1873". He was promoted to major in 1881. Brown died from consumption at the Jackson Barracks near New Orleans, Louisiana on August 20, 1889, and buried at the Chalmette National Cemetery two days later.
