= 5th Georgia Volunteer Infantry =

Infantry regiment of the Confederate States Army

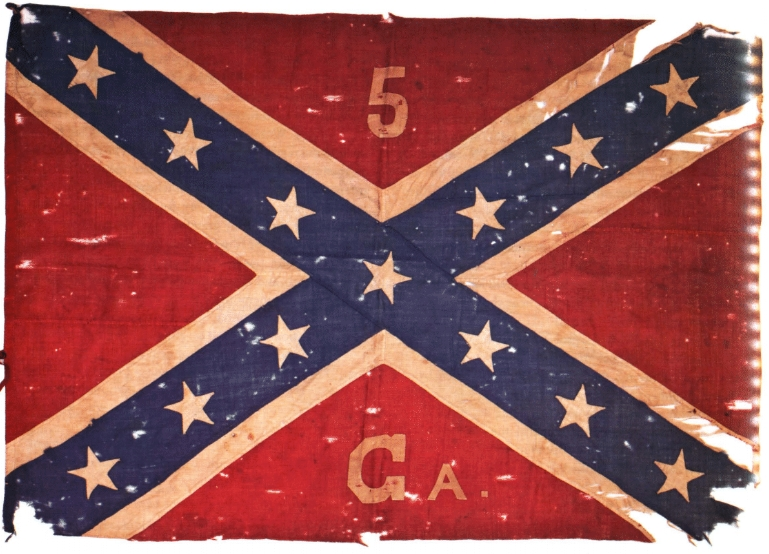
- The 5th Georgia (Co. unknown) battle flag captured in 1864 by elements of a New York regiment. (Note: A note beneath the image of the 5th Georgia Battle Flag is of the 5th Georgia veterans shown holding it ... and reads, in part: "This is the battle flag of the 5th GA. Volunteers which we lost in the fight at Coosahachie S.C. Dec. 9th - 1864. After losing [sic] three color bearers Capt. J.E. Young of the 154th N.Y. Reg'ment picked it up and kept it for twenty years". This is said to be the first most used and historically accurate version of the 5th Georgia's battle flag, contrasting to the Second National Flag, without the Battle Honors.)
- Active: May 11, 1861–April 26, 1865
- Country: Confederate States of America
- Allegiance: Georgia
- Branch: Confederate States Army
- Type: Infantry
- Size: 2,000+
- Nickname: “Poundcake Regiment”
- Colors: Green, Grey
- Engagements: American Civil War: Siege of Corinth; Battle of Stones River; Tullahoma Campaign; Battle of Chickamauga; Siege of Chattanooga; Battle of Bentonville

Commanders
- Notable commanders: Colonel John K. Jackson; Colonel Samuel W. Manghum; Colonel William T. Black; Colonel Charles P. Daniel

The 5th Georgia Volunteer Infantry was organized on May 11, 1861, and surrendered on April 26, 1865. They were formed from 10 Companies in 1861 to be first posted in Florida under General Bragg, where they received their training. Their first combat assignment was on Santa Rosa Island off the coast of Florida. The assault on the Island resulted in a victory and early experience for the regiment. Following this, the regiment was posted in early 1862 to Knoxville, Tennessee, and Corinth, Mississippi. They were ordered to move on Shiloh in April but arrived too late to participate in the battle. The regiment fought in and around Corinth until the end of May, when they were ordered to participate in the Invasion of Kentucky. Following that failure they were reassigned to battle in Murfreesboro. This proved devastating to the 5th Georgia, where they received 32% casualties along with their Colonel and the regimental battle flag. Following this defeat the regiment pulled back to Shelbyville, Tennessee, where it remained until they went to participate in the Tullahoma Campaign.

Come September 1863 the regiment was back in native Georgia. They suffered further casualties, 55%, at the Battle of Chickamauga. They participated in the Siege of Chattanooga on Missionary Ridge until they were driven from their position and fell back with the rest of the Army of Tennessee. The regiment suffered through a series of battles in their retreat through Georgia in early 1864 and served as prison guards until being moved to the South Carolina coast late that year. They fought to protect the Charleston and Savannah railroad, losing the battle flag a second time as they were forced to retreat. The 5th continued in retreat with the rest of the Confederate Army through North Carolina. They participated in the Battle of Bentonville in March, launching an assault against the Federal XX Corp, where they encountered devastating fire and were forced to fall back. The Army of Tennessee surrendered on April 26, 1865, where a few members of the regiment were present to witness the surrender at the Bennett Homestead.

== Uniforms ==
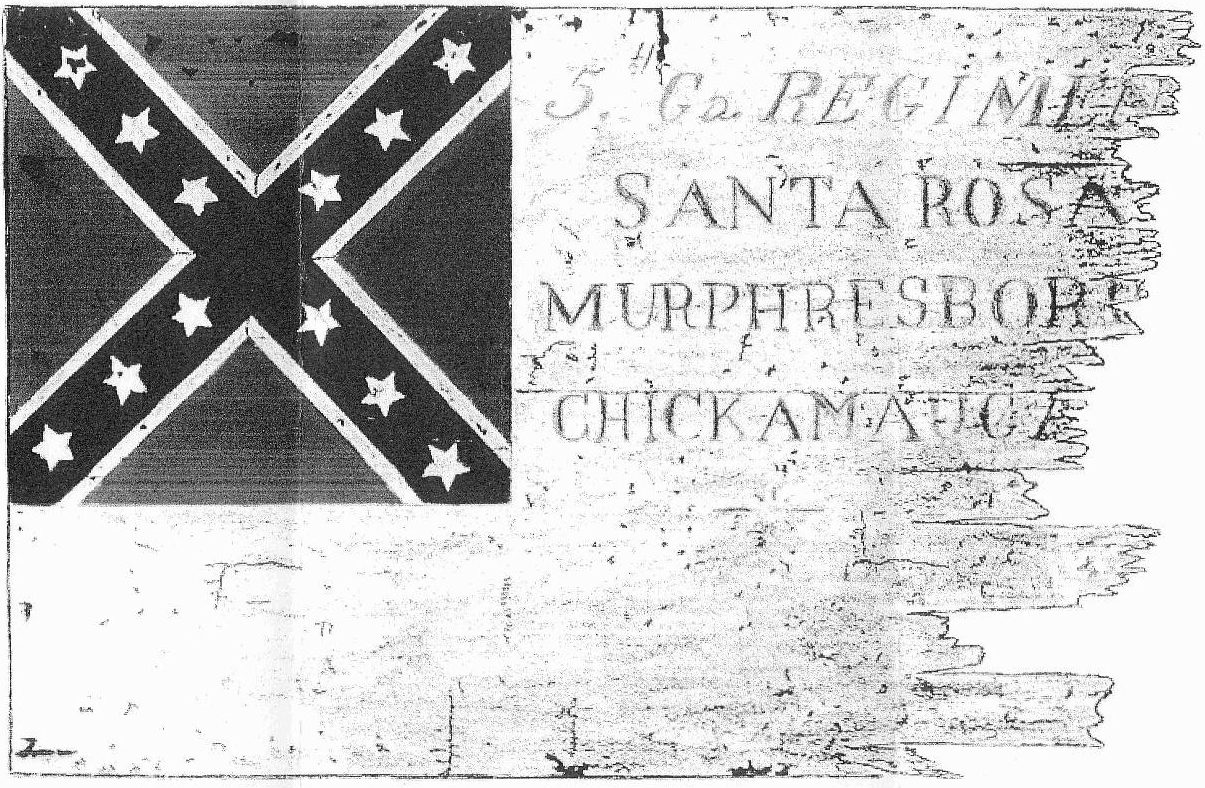
"The Bloody Banner": the Second National Flag bearing the Battle Honors of Santa Rosa, Murfreesboro, and Chickamauga. Rendition at the Augusta Museum of History, Augusta, Georgia. (Note: The flag was presented to the regiment on October 22nd, 1863. Capt. Harris of the 5th Georgia received the flag, stating, "Your past is written here... Santa Rosa, Murfreesboro, and Chickamauga look down you. Glorious are the memories which they awaken - proud the honor which they confer". The nickname of the flag, "The Bloody Banner", is in reference to these battles which were so bloody for the 5th Georgia. There is conflicting research on whether this was used in battle.)

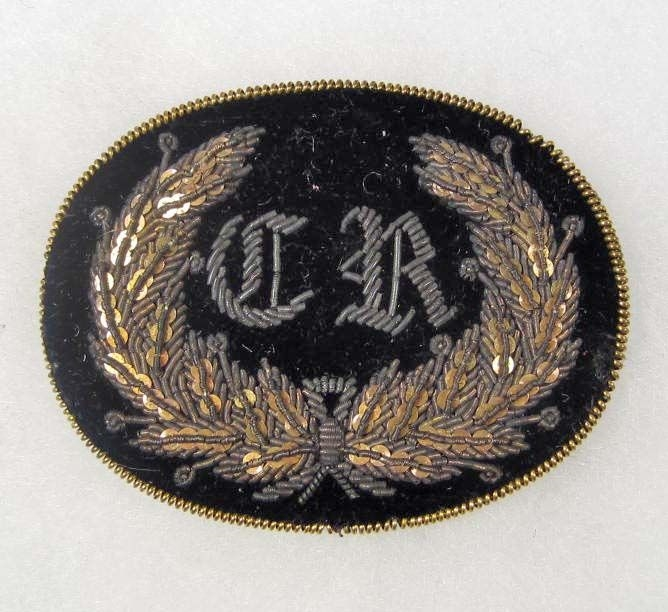
Front side of the 5th Georgia Company A insignia

It was described that the 5th Georgia companies and other regulars in the regiment had many different uniforms entering the war. The Clinch Rifles Uniform is the more widely known kind of uniform in the regiment, as one of the only to wear green into battle in the entire civil war. Later in the war, the uniforms issued by the regiment were switched to the regular grey uniform as stricter regulation came into the army.

== Regimental and Company Flags ==
There is a great deal of mystery and controversy surrounding the flags of the 5th Georgia today. Whether by coincidence or fate, the flag of the 5th Georgia was lost twice on the battlefield, at both Murfreesboro and a skirmish between Charleston and Savannah. One of their original flags, the 2nd National, is today part of the collection located in the Augusta Museum of History. Thomas Pryor "Tip" Barnes was the 5th Georgia's color bearer for the entire war, who survived the wound with the amputation of a toe and kept "a" flag, as a sacred treasure, until his death in October 1905. Thereafter, a struggle ensued between the family and several of the living Co. G veterans as to whom should maintain possession of that flag that was so dear to both factions. The flag was kept by a daughter of Tip Barnes and there is a touching plea on her behalf for this position from the Ellaville paper at this time. The flag according to Barnes family descendants was originally presented to the company (or regiment) by the wife of Col. William T. Black and was reputed to have been made by her from portions of her own silk wedding dress.

It is unknown whether this was the 1st National flag of the 5th Georgia or a Co. G, flag, nor knowledge of if it was the flag returned by Captain Young. The flag that Tip Barnes daughter kept after his death was reputedly lent to a Dr. Chapman, of Americus, for a Memorial Day event and was never returned. The flag represented in this article is a rough estimate of what was the 5th Georgia's most recent battle flag, however, it is unknown whether such flag is accurate because of the controversial exchanges in its past.

From December 1861 through April 1862, there were company flags, often presented in ceremonies that involved the whole community in which the company recruited. This practice ceased with the movement towards the various army battle flags. Based on research, as well as Confederate newspapers covering these events, the following company flags existed or still exist: Co. A, B, C, E or F, H, and K.

== Companies ==
Men often enlisted in a company recruited in the counties where they lived though not always. After many battles, companies might be combined because so many men were killed or wounded.

The Civil War Soldiers and Sailors database lists 2,162 men on its roster for this unit.

- Officers, Non-Commissioned Offices, and Staff - see - Roster on page 641
- Company A - (Clinch Rifles) Richmond County - see - Roster on page 643
- Company B - (Griffin Light Guards) Spalding County - see - Roster on page 653
- Company C - (Irish Volunteers) Richmond County - see - Roster on page 663
- Company D - (McDuffie Riflemen) Warren County - see - Roster on page 671; USGenWeb
- Company E - (Dawson Volunteers) Terrell County - see - Roster on page 681; USGenWeb
- Company F - (Cuthbert Rifles) Randolph County - see - Roster on page 689
- Company G - Schley County - see - Roster on page 696; USGenWeb
- Company H - (Hardee Rifles) Decatur County - see - Roster on page 704; USGenWeb
- Company I - (Georgia Grays) Muscogee County - see - Roster on page 714; USGenWeb
- Company K - (Upson Guards) Upson County - see - Roster on page 723; USGenWeb
- Company L - no cities or counties given - see - Roster on page 733
- Company M - Bibb County - see - Roster on page 735 (become Company A of 2 Batt. 7 Feb 1864); USGenWeb
- Company N - Clarke and Richmond Counties - see - Roster on page 738

=== Company A, Clinch Rifles ===
One of the most famous and most well-recognized names of the 5th Georgia, the name Clinch Rifles was named for General Duncan L. Clinch who served in the Seminole Indian War. The company, which was formed before the beginning of the civil war, fought in almost every engagement of the regiment and was dissolved by the end of the war in 1865.

As a rifle unit, this outfit was initially uniformed in dark green, but that pre-war finery would quickly disappear as the unit was absorbed into one of the state regiments that would eventually become Confederate regulars.

The uniform was also described by the unit commander to the governor of Georgia as follows: "Our Dress uniform is a dress coat of dark green broad cloth, with gilt rifle buttons, and trimmed with gold lace and cord on the outside seams; cap of dark green with letters 'C.R.' surrounded with a gold wreath, light green pompon; wings of brass, army style. Our fatigue dress consists of a dark green cloth jacket, trimmed with gold lace, green cap and black pants."

The company flag of the Clinch Rifles was presented on March 10, 1861. The Augusta Chronicle & Sentinel reported the presentation of a new flag for the Clinch Rifles. The article described the flag as being the design of "the Confederate States," implying it was a First National, topped with a wreath of flowers. Associated with this company is a surviving example of a flag of the size typical of so-called "Bible" flags. It resides in the collections of the Georgia Historical Society of Savannah, and it is a small silk First National flag; the word "Clinch" with a white bar on it.

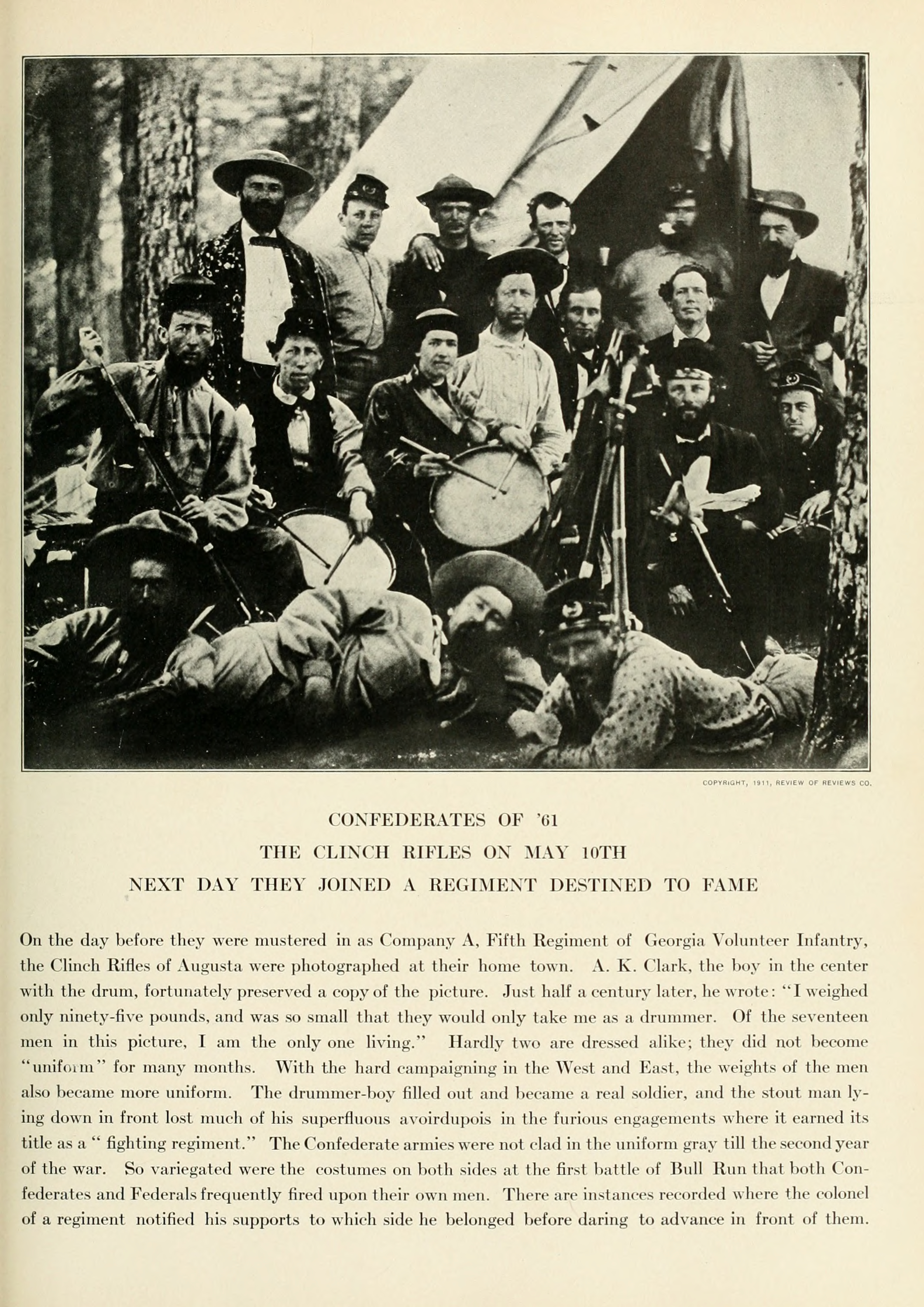

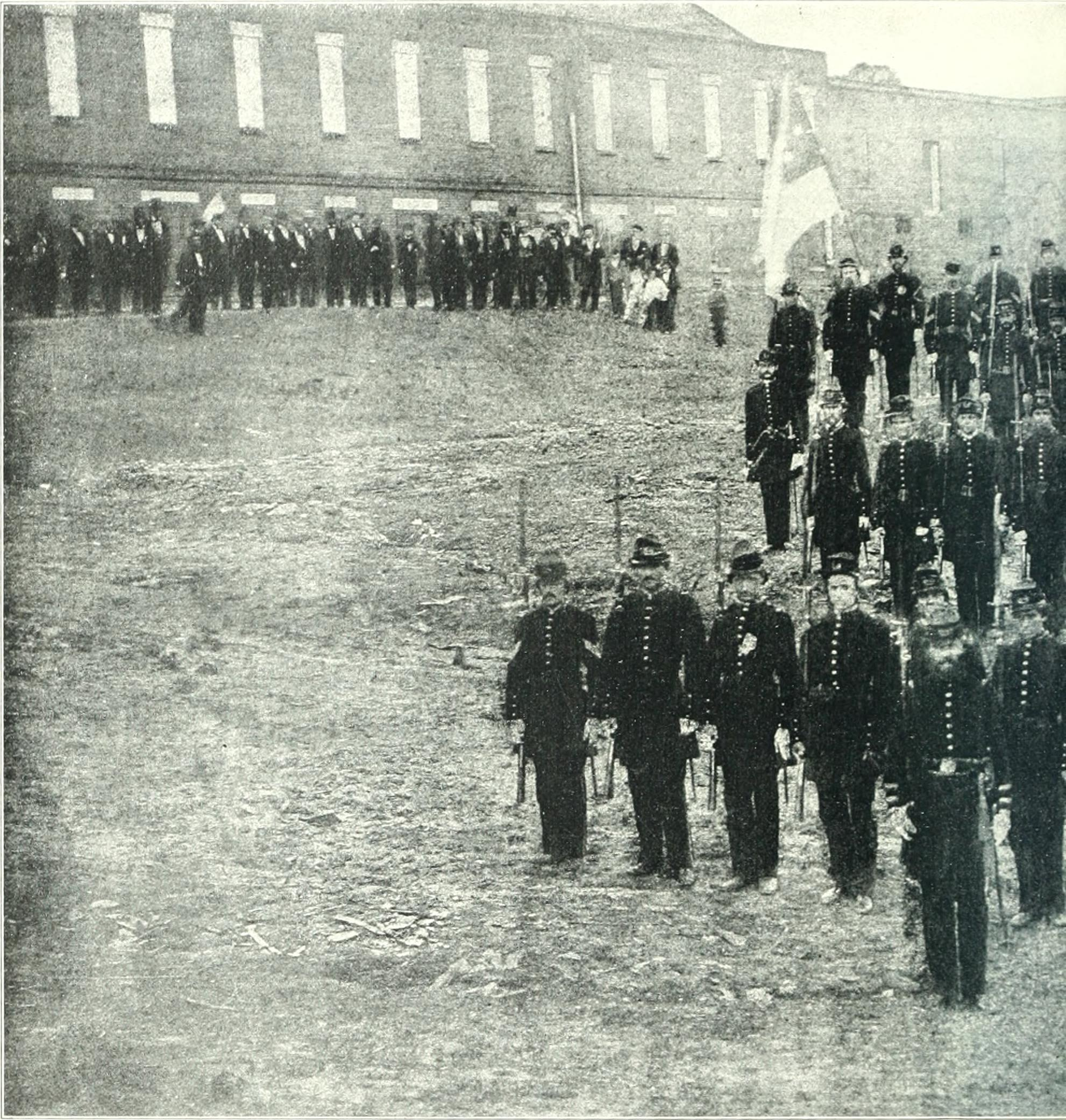
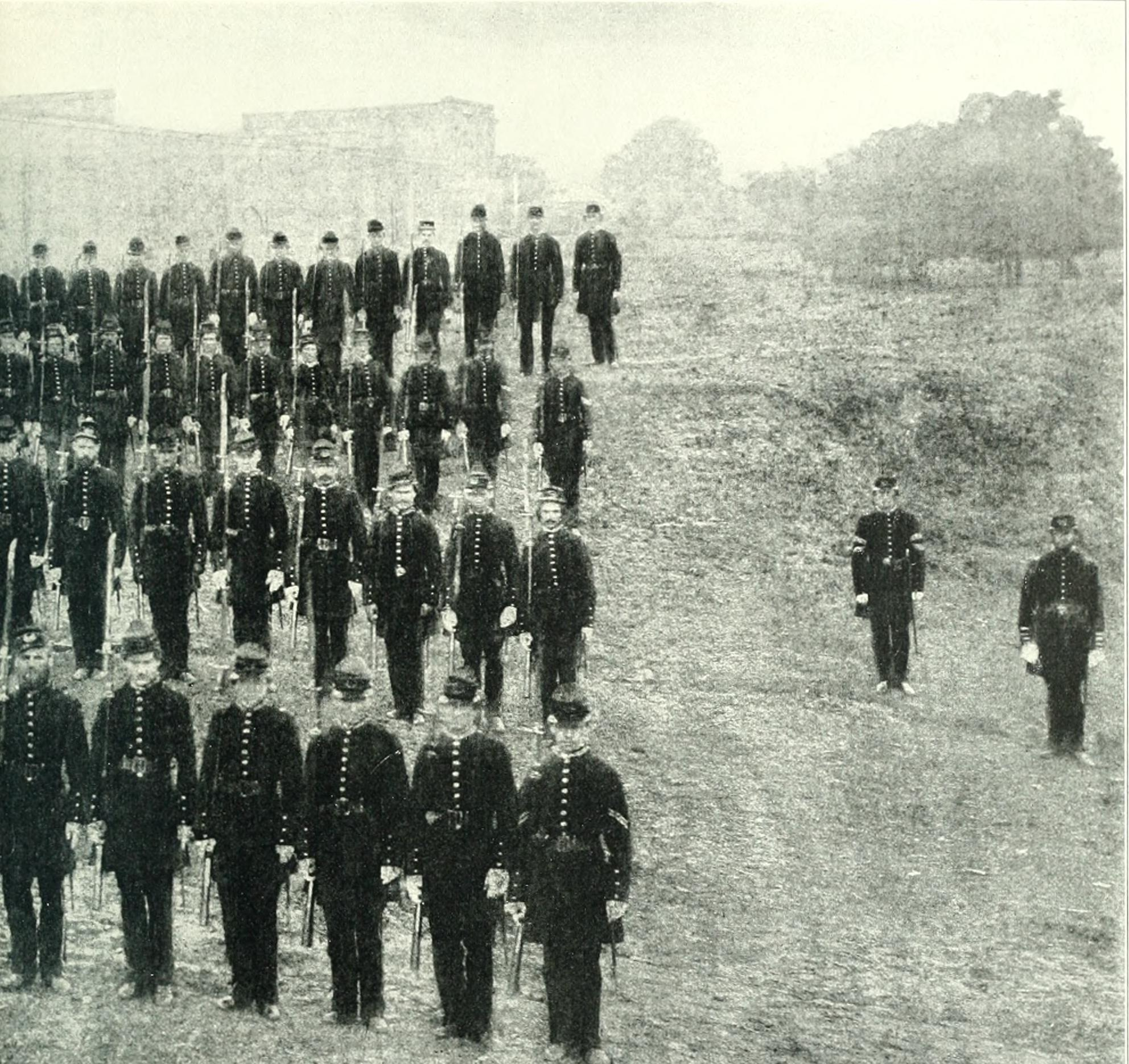
Clinch Rifles on May 10, 1861.
May 10, 1861, Men of Company A posing with a 1st National Confederate Banner.

=== Company B, Griffin Light Guards ===
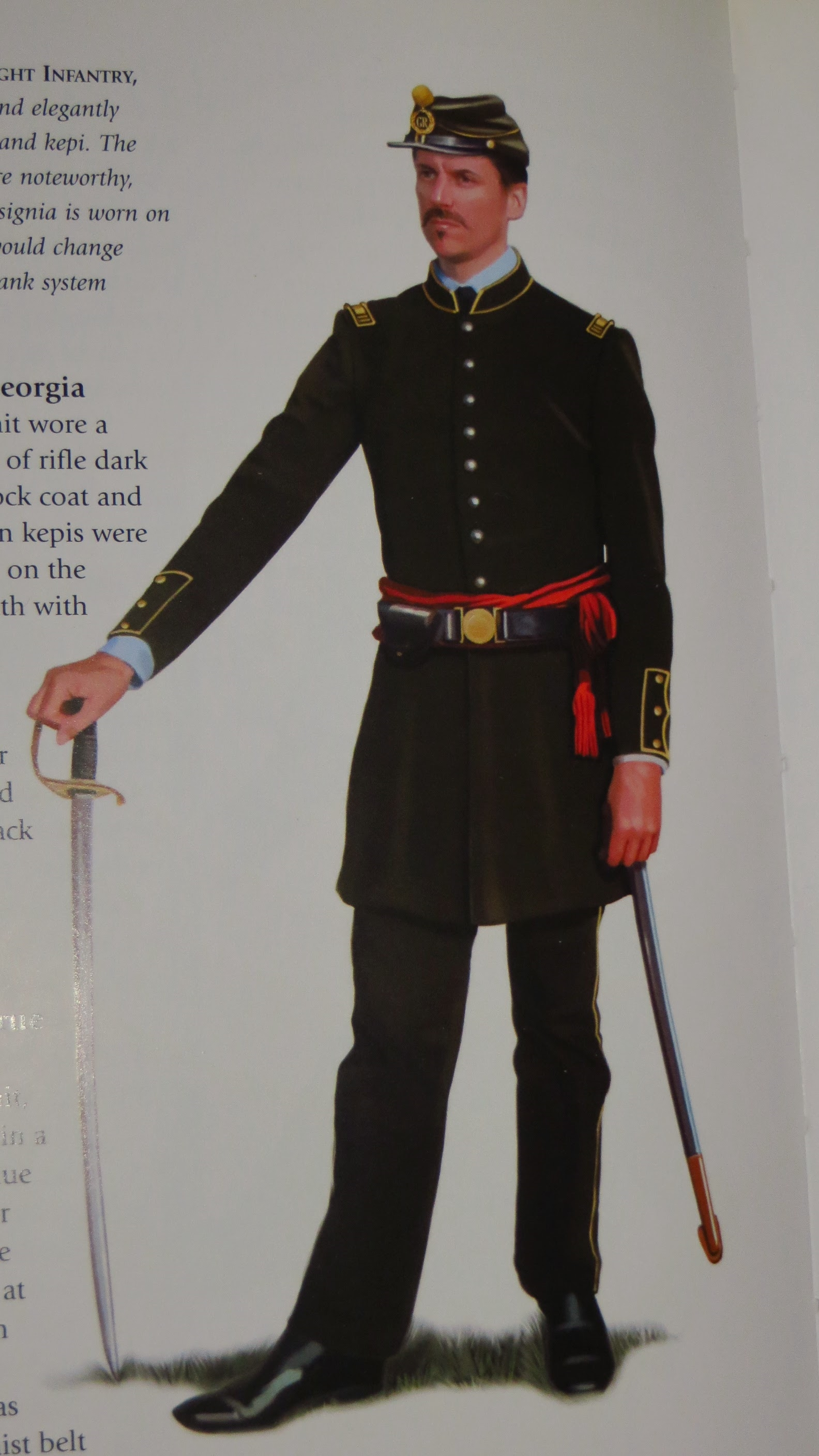
This officer from Company A is simply and elegantly uniformed in tunic, trousers and kepi. Note the French cuffs on his sleeves and the fact that his rank insignia is worn on his shoulders, a detail that changed when a new Confederate rank system was adopted.

During the Civil War, the Griffin Light Guards served as a line company. Its uniform included blue cloth caps with white plumes; blue frock coats with three rows of brass buttons, silver lace trim, and blue epaulettes. Officers had a single-breasted frock coat. Trousers were also blue, apparently with a white stripe. The company flag, presented to the company a few days before December 11, 1860, was described: "upon one side is the Coat of Arms of Georgia; on the other a huge rattlesnake, coiled around a tree and the words 'Don't tread on me'". The flag was issued before Georgia seceded in January 1861, and it was most likely used as their company colors up to the formation of the 5th Georgia.

=== Company C, Irish Volunteers ===
Alongside Richmond County, Augusta County, Georgia, contributed to these Irish Volunteers, formed in 1852, which became Co C. (nicknamed the Color Company for their Irish heritage) of the 5th Georgia Infantry Regiment; this unit suffered heavy casualties at Chickamauga, serving in John K. Jackson's Bde, Cheatham's Div of Polk's Right Wing at the time. The regiment received gray uniforms in 1862 alongside the rest of the regiment. Another Irish regiment from Augusta - a sister company named the Montgomery Guards - formally Co K, 20th Georgia Infantry, was reported by the Augusta Daily Constitutionalist on January 12, 1861, as both companies in "showy uniforms" and carrying a "beautiful new banner.", and again on May 8, 1861, reporting the Irishmen with "a handsome Confederate States banner." As with the Clinch Rifles, their flagstaff was topped with a wreath of flowers.

=== Company G, Schley County ===
There is little information on the Schley County of Company G, as the only account of them are through official documents and letters. Here is the final letter sent by Charles Womack of Schley County to his brother David, describing some routine done at the time by the company and the regiment:

Camp Stephens June 22, 1861, Brother David,

I wrote to you sometime since from this place and have waited until now for an answer, but have not received one yet. The mail has go such around about that it is impossible that it has been miscarried and you did not receive it. I hear where I should be glad to receive letters at anytime more especially as came from home. We all are enjoying very good health to be so many men together in a sickly portion of country. I find here that it is more pleasant in the shade but in the sun I believe that it is better. I cannot give you any information con-cerning the war at this place that is when it begin at this place. All preparations for war are being executed with the same dispatch as it has been all this time. Every train that comes to this point for the last few brings cannon five or six daily. Some things that there will be no (end page 1, begin page 2) fight until after the Fourth of July. For the last week they have been practicing with their large guns over at the navy yard and when they first commenced the boys thought that the fight had begun. They were eating dinner at the time and they were so excited that they did not finish their dinner. I told them that it might be the last dinner that I should get soon and I would eat a plenty. On Wednesday Gen Bragg Came over to review this regiment and said that it was very well drilled for the time they have been in service. We have four companies out of the regiment which only leaves six companies in the regiment. I received a letter from home with a letter from your. They stated that the crop was pretty good. I know if they have seasons the crop ought to be good for I put it in good order before I left home. Excuse this letter for there is a perfect moon around me all the time but I was determined to write you

Direct—5th Regiment Ga Volunteers Schley Guards, Pensacola Fla

Charles Womack

=== Company K, Upson Guard ===
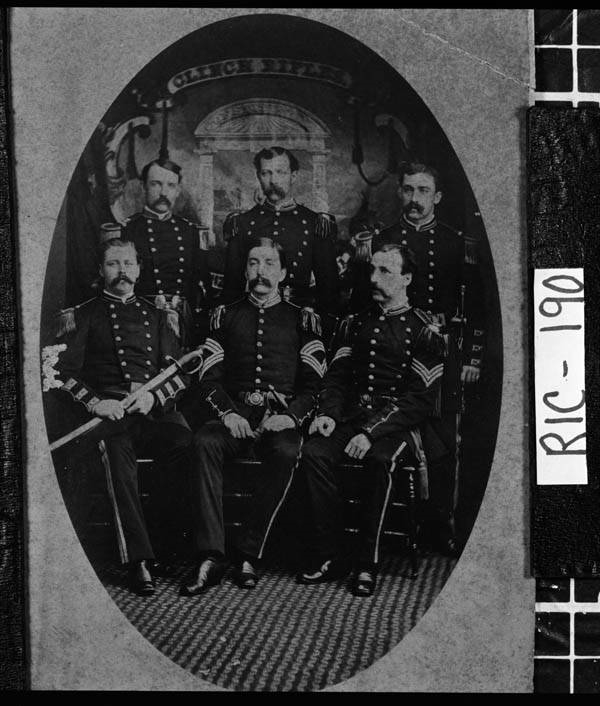
Officers of the 5th Georgia Volunteer Infantry Regiment are pictured in this photo.

"During the war this unit's designation was Company K. Its headgear was a dark blue shako with a large brass state coat of arms over the letters 'UG' within a wreath on the front and a yellow pompon. The frock coat was dark blue, with three rows of six buttons down and front, each three being connected by a double row of buff lace; the standing collar was edge in buff lace, as were the cuffs, with three lace buttonholes on each; buff epaulettes were worn by the enlisted men. Trousers were a matching blue with a buff stripe. For fatigue, the unit wore plain, dark blue jackets and trousers, and plain kepis with brass 'UG' cap badge."

=== Company H, M, N, & L, Hardees Rifles ===
Company H (Hardees Rifles) was mustered into service at Macon, Georgia, May 11, 1861. It became Company A, 2nd Battalion, Georgia Sharpshooters in 1862, alongside Companies N and L, and then merged with the known as Company M of the 5th Georgia after sustained casualties, although there is significant conflicting data; the regiment was given its nickname, presumably, under the fact that it had joined with the Harrison Brigade, who served under Lieutenant General Hardee during the late war. The latter companies of Company H were not given nicknames due to their short time in service, and their complex merging of companies which has been lost in time, similar to other less notable companies of the regiment. Company H is one of the many examples of hardships that the 5th Georgia undertook during its activity in the war. Their battle flag, which, according to museum provenance, was presented in April 1861 and had been ordered from Richmond, Virginia. The wool bunting flag features seven stars with the left side of the circle open, forming a horseshoe. The flag was given in 1906 to Miss Annie E. Campbell, who presented it to the local chapter of the United Daughters of the Confederacy (UDC) in 1941; one of the few remaining remnants of the companies existence.

== See also ==
- List of Civil War regiments from Georgia
- Alabama in the Civil War
