= Harvey Brown (officer) =

U.S. Army officer (1795–1874)

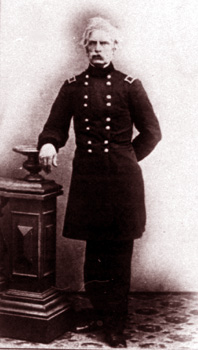
- Born: September 6, 1795; Rahway, New Jersey, U.S.
- Died: March 31, 1874 (aged 78); Clifton, New York, U.S.
- Burial place: Hazelwood Cemetery
- Relatives: Harvey E. Brown Jr. (son)
- Military career
- Allegiance: United States of America; Union
- Branch: United States Army; Union Army
- Service years: 1818–1867
- Rank: Colonel; Brevet Major General
- Commands: 5th United States Artillery
- Conflicts: Black Hawk War; Second Seminole War; Battle of Wahoo Swamp; Mexican–American War; Battle of Monterrey; Siege of Veracruz; Battle of Cerro Gordo; Battle of Contreras; Battle of Chapultepec; Third Seminole War; American Civil War; Battle of Santa Rosa Island; New York Draft Riots

Harvey Brown (September 6, 1795 – March 31, 1874) was an American military officer who fought in the Black Hawk and Seminole Wars, the Mexican–American War and the American Civil War. He was also in command of military forces in New York City and later assisted in putting down the New York Draft Riots in 1863. His son Harvey E. Brown, Jr. also had a prominent military career as a surgeon and later historian of the U.S. Army Medical Department.

== Early life and career ==
Harvey E. Brown was born in Bridgetown (part of present-day Rahway, New Jersey). He was disciplined and studious, graduating from the United States Military Academy at West Point, New York on July 24, 1818, as a second lieutenant of light artillery. He spent the first years of his military career on garrison duty in Boston, Massachusetts and New London, Connecticut as well as commissary duty in St. Augustine, Florida. Upon the reorganization of the U.S. Army in 1821, Brown was assigned to the 1st United States Artillery and was officially promoted to first lieutenant on August 28, 1821. From 1824 to 1825, he served as an aide-de-camp to Major General Jacob Brown, then commanding general of the U.S. Army, and was assigned to quartermaster duty for three years. In 1831, Brown was made a captain and participated in the Black Hawk War the following year. Brown also took part in the Second Seminole War as a lieutenant colonel, participating in the Battle of Wahoo Swamp, and was brevetted a major for "gallant conduct" on November 21, 1836. Between 1839 and 1841, he suppressed a series of disputes on the Canada–US border.

During the Mexican–American War, Brown served as a major under Generals Zachary Taylor and Winfield Scott. He won distinction at the battles of Monterrey, Cerro Gordo, Contreras, and the Gate of Belén during the fall of Mexico City, brevetted a lieutenant colonel and colonel in the last two engagements respectively. Involved with military recruitment from 1848 to 1852, he fought in the Third Seminole War and remained in Florida until 1857. Brown served in various duties and was Inspector of Artillery prior to the American Civil War.

== Civil War ==
In January 1861, Brown was appointed military commander of Washington, D.C., and Fort McHenry and remained in this capacity until war broke out four months later. He was initially assigned to the 4th United States Artillery but, declining promotion to brigadier general, he was appointed commanding officer of the new 5th United States Artillery on May 14, 1861. Placed in command of the expedition to hold Fort Pickens in Confederate held Florida, he successfully defended Santa Rosa Island on October 9 and repulsed an attempt by the enemy to capture the fortress during November 22–23, 1861. On April 25, 1862, President Abraham Lincoln nominated Brown for appointment to the grade of brevet brigadier general in the regular army, to rank from November 23, 1861, for "gallantry and good conduct during the engagement of November 22 and 23, 1861 between Fort Pickens and the rebel batteries", and the United States Senate confirmed the appointment on March May 12, 1862. Brown was appointed commander of New York Harbor in April 1862 and full military commander in January 1863. He remained in New York for over a year and, during the New York Draft Riots, Brown oversaw military operations against the rioters and was especially involved in the final suppression of the rioters. He retired from active duty on August 1, 1863. On December 11, 1866, President Andrew Johnson nominated Brown for appointment to the grade of brevet major general in the regular army, to rank from August 2, 1866, and the United States Senate confirmed the appointment on February 23, 1867 (recalled February 25 and reconfirmed March 2, 1867).

== Postbellum life ==
Brown was awaiting orders from June 29, 1864, to November 9, 1866, then served as superintendent of the Army recruiting service until April 5, 1867. He died at Clifton, New York, and is buried in Hazelwood Cemetery, Rahway, New Jersey.

== See also ==
- List of American Civil War brevet generals (Union)
