= William Wilson (Zouave) =

Union Army brevet brigadier general (1823–1874)

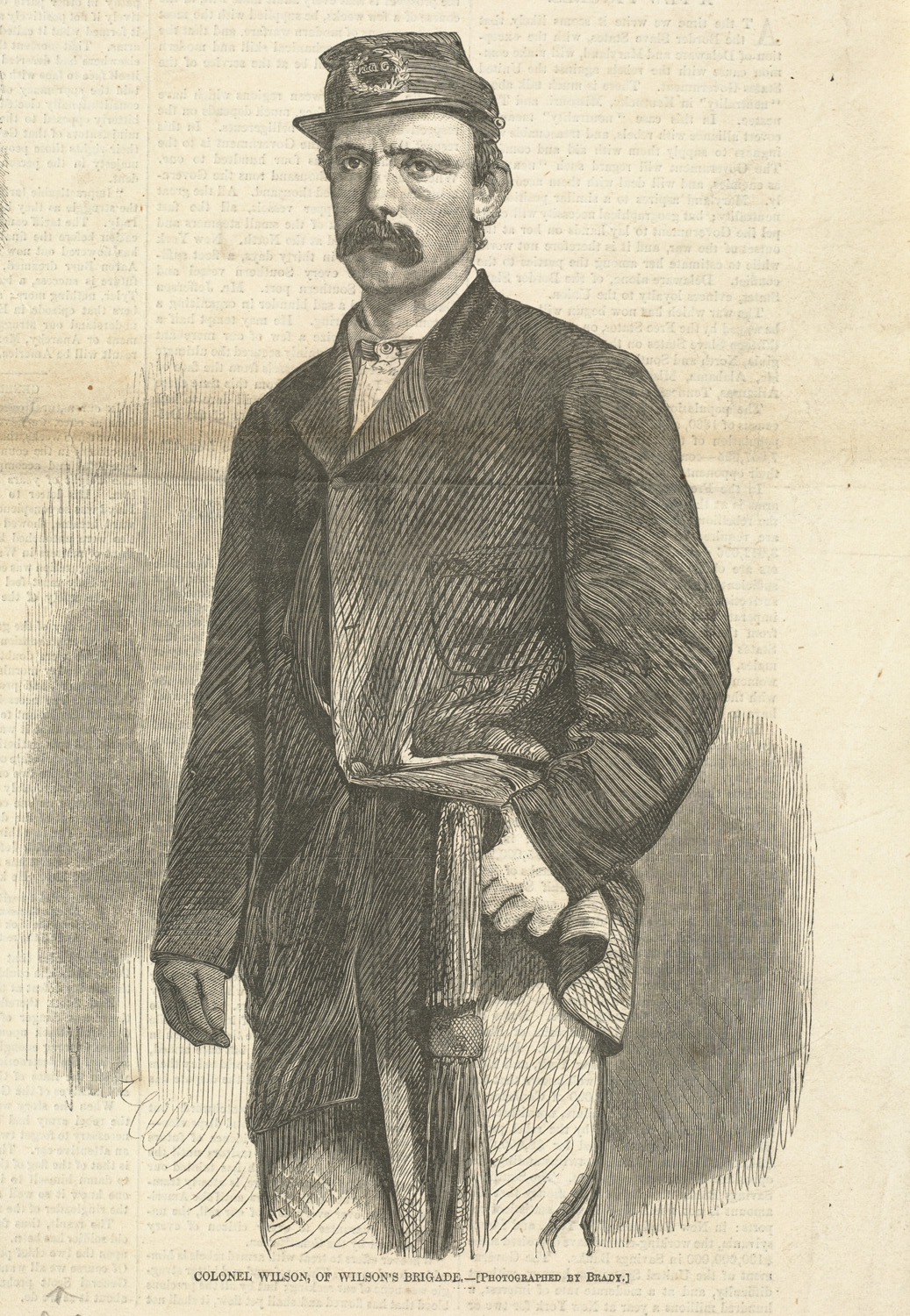
Colonel William Wilson by Winslow Homer. 1861

William Wilson (1823 – November 13, 1874) was a native of England who emigrated to New York and was a Union Army officer during the American Civil War.

== Biography ==
Wilson had been a prize fighter and was associated with the New York City Democratic political machine, being a member of the so-called Mozart Hall Democracy faction headed by Fernando Wood. In 1856, Wilson was elected as an alderman with the backing of the Democratic Party. He was also a real estate agent.

On May 25, 1861, Wilson was appointed colonel of the 6th New York Volunteer Infantry, known as Billy Wilson's Zouaves.

On May 11, 1861, he was featured on the cover of the Harper's Weekly illustrated by Winslow Homer after Mathew Brady's photograph.

Wilson served in Florida and Louisiana in 1862 and early 1863. He was mustered out of the United States Volunteers on June 25, 1863.

In 1864, Wilson was placed in command of a militia regiment, the 69th New York Regiment, by Governor Seymour.

On July 20, 1866, President Andrew Johnson nominated Wilson for appointment to the grade of brevet brigadier general of volunteers, to rank from March 13, 1865, and the United States Senate confirmed the appointment on July 26, 1866.

William Wilson died on November 13, 1874, in New York City. He was buried at Calvary Cemetery in Queens.

== See also ==
- Fort Jefferson, Florida
- Battle of Santa Rosa Island
- List of American Civil War brevet generals (Union)
