= John Q. Loomis =

Confederate States Army officer

John Quincy Loomis
- Born: c. 1824; South Carolina
- Died: December 4, 1869 (aged 44–45) Wetumpka, Alabama
- Buried: Wetumpka City Cemetery
- Allegiance: United States; Confederate States of America
- Branch: United States Army; Confederate States Army
- Service years: 1847–1848; 1861–1863
- Rank: Colonel
- Commands: 1st Alabama Infantry Battalion; 25th Alabama Infantry Regiment; Deas' Brigade
- Conflicts: Mexican–American War; American Civil War; Battle of Shiloh; Battle of Stones River
- Other work: Lawyer

John Quincy Loomis (c. 1824 – December 4, 1869) was a Confederate States Army officer who held brigade command during the American Civil War.

A veteran of the Mexican–American War, Loomis became a small-town lawyer during the antebellum period. An advocate of secession, he led the local militia company in the first weeks of the Siege of Pensacola. After the start of the American Civil War, Loomis became commander of an artillery company and then rose to battalion command in late 1861. Before the Battle of Shiloh, he was made colonel of the 25th Alabama Infantry Regiment. Wounded while leading the regiment at Shiloh, Loomis commanded a brigade at the beginning of the Battle of Stones River. However, he was wounded at the beginning of the Confederate attack at Stones River and resigned from the army afterwards. Returning to his practice as a lawyer, Loomis died several years after the end of the war.

== Antebellum period ==
Born c. 1824 in South Carolina according to census and muster data, Loomis became a lawyer in Alabama during the antebellum period. He was first sergeant of Captain John Gorham Barr's Company A of the 1st Alabama Volunteer Infantry Battalion that mustered into service during the Mexican–American War on November 25, 1847. Loomis served with the unit on garrison duty at Orizaba and mustered out with it at the end of the war in June 1848. By the 1850 census, he was a lawyer living in Shelby. He married Mary Henry in Bibb County that year on December 19. Loomis and his wife moved to Wetumpka, a small town in Coosa County near the state capital of Montgomery, where he became a practicing attorney-at-law and solicitor by 1856, described as a "prominent citizen" in the county history. Loomis was selected by the mayor to be among the delegates representing the town at the 1856 Southern Commercial Convention in Savannah, Georgia, which became a venue for secessionist rhetoric. Loomis and his wife had three sons and a daughter by 1860, when the census recorded him as the owner of real estate valued at $2,000 and the same amount in other assets. He was also master of the local masonic lodge. Loomis captained the local Wetumpka Light Guards militia company, which he led in Montgomery's 1860 Independence Day parade.

== Secession and American Civil War ==
Loomis was active in support of the presidential campaign of proslavery Southern Democrat John C. Breckinridge during the 1860 election, giving a speech at a meeting organizing the local Breckinridge and Lane Club. After Republican Abraham Lincoln was elected president, the 1859 resolution requiring Alabama to hold a secession convention if a Republican won the presidency went into effect. Loomis stood for election as a secessionist delegate to the convention, but he and the two other secessionist candidates from Coosa County lost to the cooperationist candidates by about 200 votes on December 24. Meanwhile, as the secessionists prepared for war, Loomis' Wetumpka Light Guards mustered into state service in November and after Alabama seceded in January 1861 were sent together with other Alabama militia companies to take over Federal military installations at the port of Pensacola, Florida. The Alabama and Florida militia companies seized the Warrington Navy Yard, but were unable to take Fort Pickens, where the Federal garrison held out. A truce was arranged in which the secessionists agreed to not attack the fort if its defenders were not reinforced, and the situation developed into a quiet siege for the next several weeks. In late February the original companies were relieved and returned to Montgomery to popular acclaim.

After the Light Guards returned from Pensacola, Loomis resigned his captaincy and was appointed captain of Company E, 1st Battalion, Alabama Artillery on February 23. While the Light Guards went to Virginia after the American Civil War began when Confederates fired on Fort Sumter, Loomis recruited Company E in Wetumpka. The battalion was mustered into Confederate government service as Regulars and manned the defenses of the port of Mobile, with Company E stationed at Fort Morgan and later Fort Gaines. Loomis resigned his captaincy of the company on September 17 to become lieutenant colonel of the newly formed 1st Alabama Infantry Battalion, which combined with the 6th (McClellan's) Alabama Infantry Battalion at Mobile in December to form the 25th Alabama Infantry Regiment. Loomis was made colonel of the 25th Alabama and McClellan his lieutenant colonel, with the new unit forming part of Jones M. Withers' Army of Mobile.

=== Shiloh ===
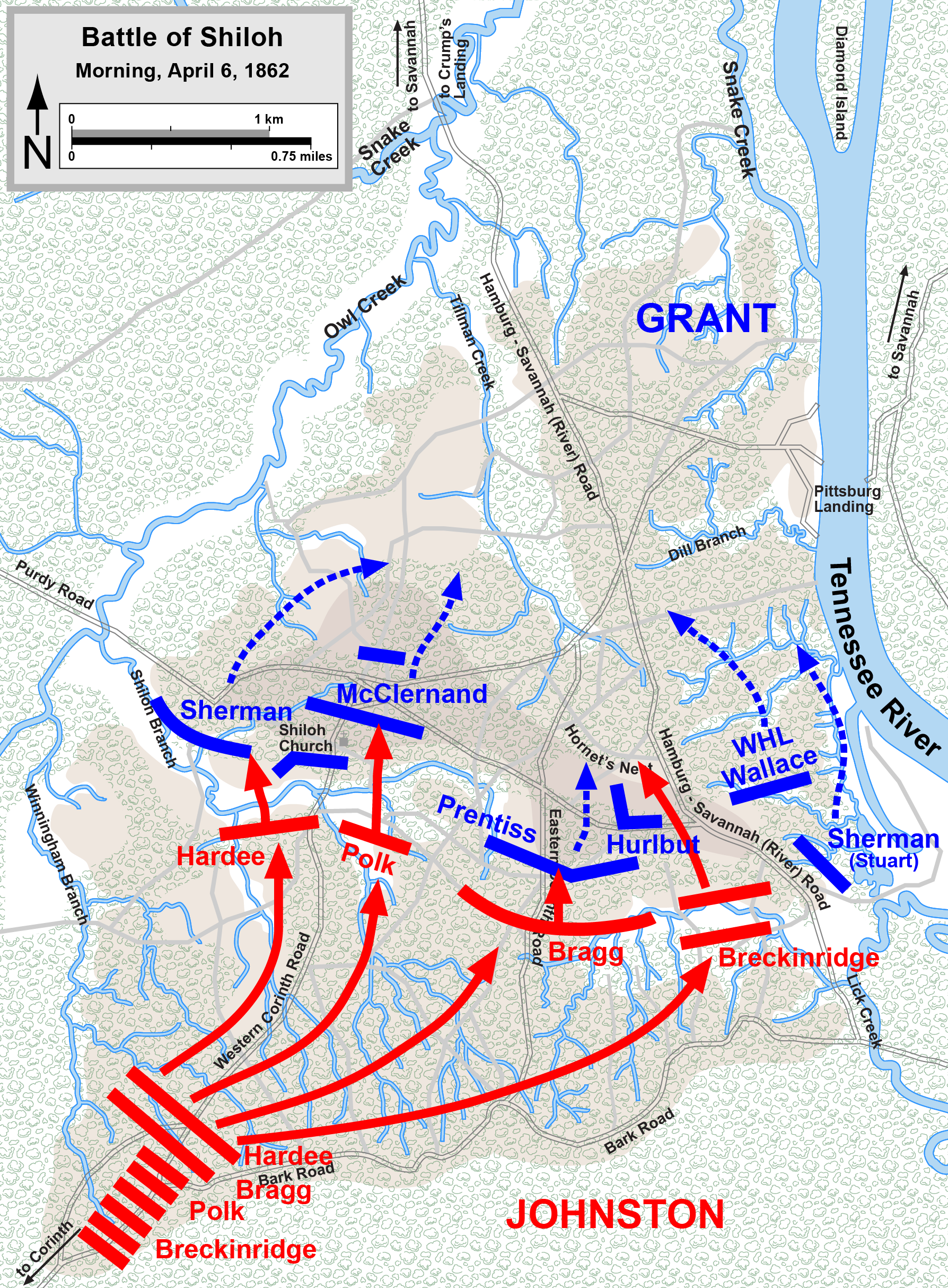
Situation at Shiloh on the morning of 6 April, note that Gladden's brigade attacked on the right of Hardee's line

After the fall of Fort Donelson on 16 February, the Tennessee River was opened up for a Union advance against the critical rail junction of the Memphis and Charleston and the Mobile and Ohio Railroads at Corinth, Mississippi. To prevent the capture of Corinth, which linked the Atlantic and the Mississippi River, much of Withers' force was sent to Corinth, where the Army of Mississippi was to concentrate under Albert Sidney Johnston. For the Battle of Shiloh, the 25th Alabama formed part of Gladden's brigade of Withers' Division in Braxton Bragg's Corps, together with the 21st, 22nd, and 26th Alabama, the 1st Louisiana Regulars, and Robertson's Alabama Battery. Due to rampant illness among the regiment, Loomis only led 305 men into battle.

In the initial advance of the brigade at 7:00 a.m. on April 6, the 25th Alabama attacked on the left of the brigade, forcing back the 16th Wisconsin from Miller's brigade of Prentiss' division. In his post-battle report, Loomis described the men of the regiment as rushing forward "in a noble rivalry as to who should do the most." Advancing into the open Spain Field, the brigade engaged in fierce fighting in which it suffered heavy losses, including the mortally wounded Gladden. Daniel W. Adams of the 1st Louisiana took command of the brigade, which was temporarily forced to retreat. Chalmers' brigade came up on the right, outflanking Miller, and Adams, holding the colors of the 1st Louisiana, ordered an advance at the double-quick against the 18th Missouri and 61st Illinois on Miller's right, supported by the fire of Robertson's battery. The outnumbered Union troops broke under the pressure of Chalmers' and Gladden's brigades, abandoning their tents, where the men of the 25th Alabama shared in the brigade's spoils from Prentiss' camp, including multiple colors. For several hours, the brigade remained in reserve in the vicinity of the camp, before participating in the encirclement of Prentiss' Division later in the afternoon. Adams was wounded and replaced in command of the brigade by Colonel Zachariah C. Deas of the 22nd Alabama. However, around 4:00 p.m., Loomis suffered a concussion from a grazing musket ball, rendering him "unfit for command." He was succeeded by Major George D. Johnston of the regiment, who commanded the 25th for the rest of the battle.

=== Stones River ===
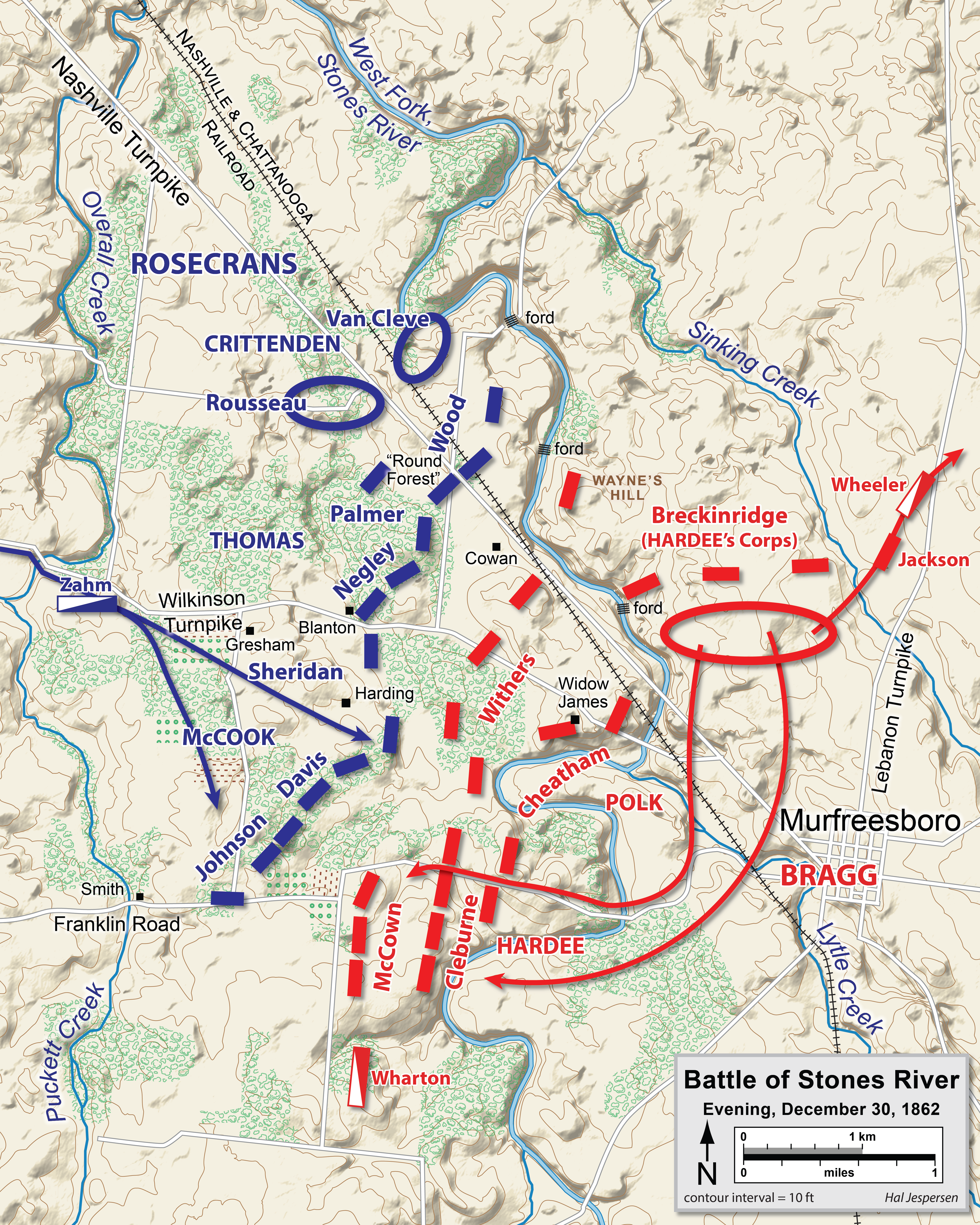
Stones River, Movements and positions the night of December 30 to 31

With Gardner's Brigade of Withers' Division in Polk's Right Wing of the Army of Mississippi, Looms led the 25th Alabama during the Confederate invasion of Kentucky that began in August 1862, but Withers' Division was detached and thus missed the Battle of Perryville, the major battle of the campaign. Deas was promoted to brigadier general in December, but fell ill, leaving Loomis in command of the brigade, in Withers' Division of Polk's Corps, before the Battle of Stones River. The 2,400-man brigade consisted of the 1st Louisiana Regulars, the 19th, 22nd, 25th, 26th, and 39th Alabama Infantry Regiments, and the 17th Alabama Battalion Sharpshooters, supported by Robertson's Alabama Battery.

The brigade was initially detached for outpost duty on Stewart's Creek near Las Casas several miles from Murfreesboro. It was ordered back at 8:00 p.m. on December 29 and rejoined Withers' Division by 3:00 a.m. on December 30, taking position on the right of Manigault's Brigade and the Franklin Pike with Vaughan's brigade from Cheatham's Division in support. In the afternoon, the Union right began advancing and Carlin's brigade of Davis' division forced the Confederate pickets back to the Franklin Pike when Robertson's battery, supported by the 154th Tennessee, detached from Vaughan's brigade, opened fire on them west of the Widow Smith House. The 21st Illinois and 15th Wisconsin of Carlin's brigade forced the abandonment of Robertson's battery, but were checked when the 26th and 29th Alabama from Loomis' brigade stood up from behind a fence, pouring a "well directed fire" into the Union troops. The 25th Alabama moved up to the fence to repulse a renewed attack from the 21st Illinois, which retreated in disorder forcing the Union troops to disengage. Cheatham's post-battle report recorded an estimated 75 casualties in Loomis' and Vaughan's brigades in the day's fighting.

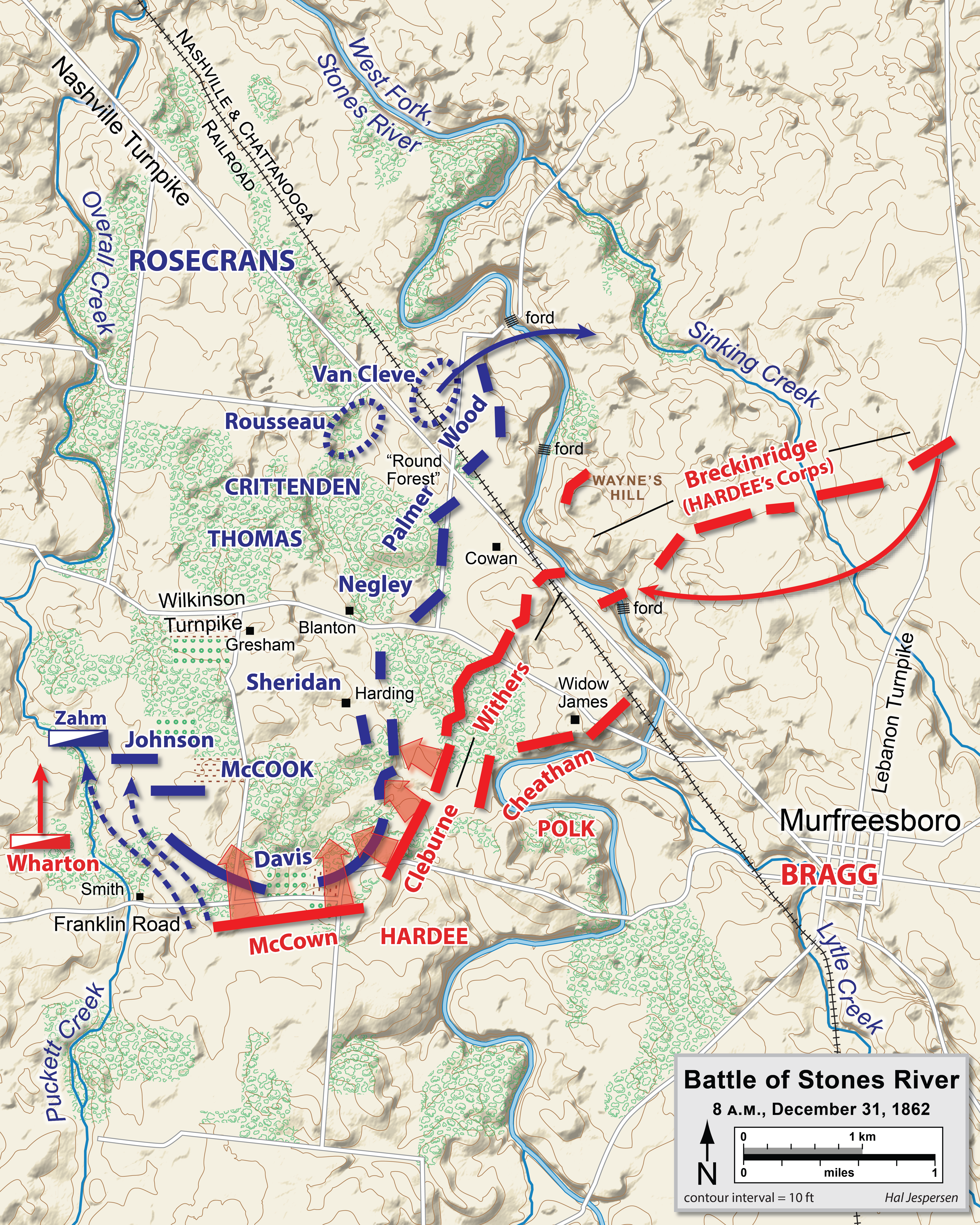
Stones River, December 31, 8:00 a.m.

The night before, the brigade was shifted from Withers' to Cheatham's Division by Leonidas Polk, seeking to simplify the command structure. Cheatham's drunkenness delayed the main attack when the battle began on December 31 until 7:00 a.m., an hour after the battle began, and instead of a combined attack Cheatham sent his brigades into battle piecemeal, starting with Loomis' Brigade. Loomis led the brigade northwest from the woods east of the Widow Smith House into an open field, held by Woodruff's brigade. However, Loomis was not yet out of the woods when he was wounded in the shoulder by a falling tree branch hit by a shell, knocking him out of the fight. Colonel John G. Coltart of the 26th Alabama took command and continued the attack, in which the brigade initially forced the Union troops to retreat but ultimately suffered heavy losses as their opponents rallied to successfully counterattack. Coltart remained in command of the brigade for the rest of the battle.

By the end of January 1863, Loomis was left without a command when his regiment was consolidated in the field with the 22nd Alabama. George D. Johnston took over command of the consolidated regiment, while Loomis was detached to serve as commanding officer of the Hospital Guard at Atlanta. Prior to Stones River, on December 12, Loomis had been recorded as unfit for field service due to rheumatism. Loomis resigned from the army on September 14, 1863, due to this condition. Historian Bruce Allardice quotes a source describing Loomis as having a "high reputation in the army as tactician and disciplinarian."

== Later life ==
Loomis resumed his legal career after the end of the war, and was selected by the state legislature as a chancellor of the Middle Division of the state chancery court system in 1865. Loomis served as a chancellor until 1868. His youngest son died of "congestion of the brain" in 1867. Loomis died at Wetumpka on December 4, 1869, and was buried in an unmarked grave at the city cemetery.
