= 1st Louisiana Regulars Infantry Regiment =

Infantry regiment of the Confederate States Army

- Battle flag of the type issued to the regiment as part of Bragg's corps in early 1862
- Active: February 1861 – May 1865
- Country: Confederate States of America
- Branch: Confederate States Army
- Type: Infantry
- Size: c. 860 (March 1861)
- Engagements: Battle of Santa Rosa Island; Battle of Shiloh; Battle of Stones River; Battle of Chickamauga; Battle of New Hope Church; Battle of Ezra Church; Battle of Jonesborough; Battle of Nashville; Battle of Spanish Fort

Commanders
- Notable commanders: Adley H. Gladden; Daniel W. Adams

The 1st Louisiana Regulars Infantry Regiment, often referred to as the 1st Louisiana Infantry Regiment (Regulars), was an infantry regiment from Louisiana that served in the Confederate States Army during the American Civil War.

Raised in early 1861 in New Orleans, the regiment was sent to Pensacola and served there as cannoneers for the Confederate batteries. Transferred to the Army of Mississippi in March 1862, the 1st Louisiana Regulars suffered heavy casualties in the Battle of Shiloh. After participating in the Siege of Corinth and the Confederate Heartland Offensive later that year, the regiment became part of the Army of Tennessee when the Army of Mississippi was renamed in November. After further losses at the Battle of Stones River, the regiment was placed on provost duty, being briefly consolidated with the 8th Arkansas Infantry Regiment to fight in the Battle of Chickamauga in September 1863. In early 1864 the 1st Louisiana Regulars were attached to Randall Gibson's brigade, which they served with for the rest of the war, fighting in the Atlanta campaign, the Battle of Nashville, and the Battle of Spanish Fort before they surrendered at the end of the war.

== Origins ==
Following the victory of Abraham Lincoln in the 1860 U.S. election, Louisiana Governor Thomas O. Moore moved rapidly to assure the secession of his state from the country. In early December, he called a special session of the state legislature, which arranged for the election of delegates to a secession convention and acceded to his request to create a special military board responsible for arms purchasing and distribution in addition to authorizing the funding of volunteer companies, at least one for each parish. Among the members of the military board were sugar planter and former army officer Braxton Bragg, a veteran of the Mexican–American War, and lawyer and cotton broker Daniel W. Adams, who had no military experience.

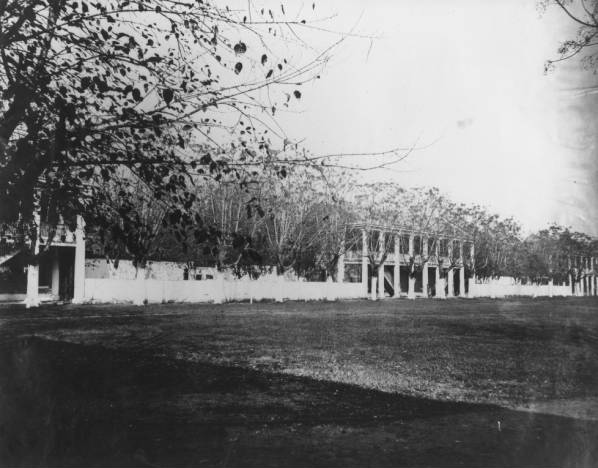
The New Orleans army barracks in the 1860s

After South Carolina became the first state to secede on 20 December, Moore ordered the seizure by militia of the Federal Baton Rouge Arsenal and Barracks, Forts Jackson, St. Philip, and Pike, as well as the army barracks below New Orleans on 8 January. The forts were quickly handed over by the lone ordnance sergeants in charge of them on 10 January and Bragg forced the surrender of the outnumbered arsenal garrison on the same day. Meanwhile, militia officers Charles MacPherson Bradford, a district attorney, and John A. Jacques, a police officer and former filibuster, each raised companies that were initially known as the 1st and 2nd Companies of the Louisiana Infantry. These companies were officially authorized under a plan to raise 500 regulars for four-month terms of service on the next day. Bradford and Jacques had both served as junior officers in the Mexican–American War.

Bradford took control of the New Orleans Marine Hospital at the New Orleans army barracks on 12 January and had its patients removed to another hospital in order to quarter newly mustered in regulars, an action much sensationalized in Northern newspapers. Moore authorized the enlistment of Bradford and Jacques' companies as Companies A and B, respectively, of what was designated as the 1st Regiment, Louisiana Infantry, which also contained three other newly organized companies, by 25 January. These companies relieved the militiamen in their occupation of the forts and the Baton Rouge Arsenal and Barracks. The state convention officially voted to secede on 26 January, although Moore's actions had already essentially taken the state out of the Union, and Louisiana almost immediately joined the Confederate States of America. In response to the secession vote, Moore ordered the seizure of the only remaining unoccupied Federal post, Fort Macomb, which was carried out on 28 January by a Captain Henry A. Clinch's Company C of the 1st Louisiana.

== Formation ==
The 1st Louisiana Regulars were organized on 5 February 1861 in accordance with an ordinance passed at the state secession convention to establish the Louisiana State Army, a standing army under Bragg's command consisting of an infantry and an artillery regiment modeled on the United States Regular Army, subject to the same discipline as a regular unit. The ordinance stipulated that the infantry regiment would include eight companies with ninety privates each in addition to officers and sergeants. The men of the regiment enlisted for three years of service rather than the single year of the volunteers, and unlike the latter, could not elect their own officers. Instead, Adley H. Gladden was appointed colonel, Adams lieutenant colonel, and Bradford major. Gladden had commanded a regiment in combat during the Mexican–American War. Recruited in New Orleans, the regiment included a large number of immigrants, and was described by one soldier of the 19th Louisiana as being "composed exclusively of Irish". Immigrants joining the Louisiana Regulars were often unskilled laborers in civilian life, which placed them at the bottom of the social hierarchy, resulting in economic motivations for enlistment and willingness to enlist for long service terms, in contrast to volunteers.

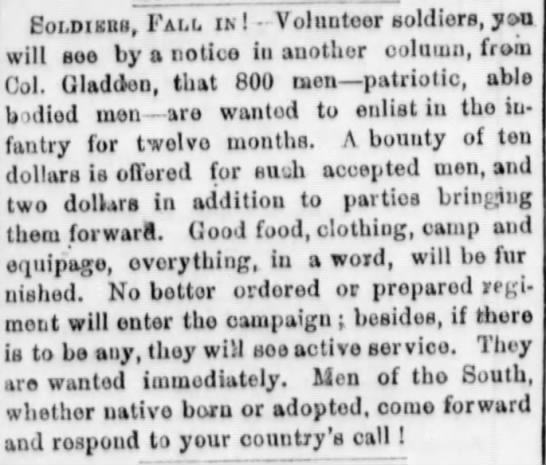
An item in the pro-secessionist Daily Delta of New Orleans exhorting men to join the regiment, April 1861

With a strength of roughly 860 men, the regiment transferred to the Provisional Army of the Confederate States on 13 March. During this period the men who enlisted in January were discharged, including those of Jacques' company, and new companies raised to replace them. By April, prospective recruits were enticed by the reduction of the enlistment term to one year, the standard for volunteer units, and a $10 bounty. In early April, the regiment was ordered to Pensacola on the Florida Gulf Coast where the Confederates were blockading Union-held Fort Pickens, after the latter received reinforcements, breaking an understanding between the garrison and the Confederates that the garrison would not accept reinforcements if they were not attacked. Due to these movements, the strengths of the Union garrison and the Confederate forces under the command of Bragg at Pensacola were nearly equivalent, resulting in demands from the Confederate government for troops to augment Bragg's force.

The dispatch of the regiment was initially opposed by Moore due to his fears that the Union would attack New Orleans, but Confederate Secretary of War LeRoy Pope Walker's insistence that the threat was nonexistent prevailed. As only Companies A, B, and C had finished recruiting, Moore appealed to volunteer units to complete the regiment. The three complete companies departed for Pensacola on 11 April, followed a week later by the five volunteer companies that responded, the recruitment being aided by a surge in enlistments after the Confederate firing on Fort Sumter began the war in earnest. The companies spent the next several weeks drilling after their arrival in Florida. The remaining seven companies of the 1st Regulars arrived at Pensacola by late May, the regiment having been expanded to ten companies in keeping with standard Confederate practice, and the volunteers were transferred to Virginia as the 1st Louisiana Infantry Battalion.

== Pensacola ==
As 1861 turned to summer and then fall, the 1st Louisiana Regulars continued drilling while serving as cannoneers for the heavy artillery batteries at Pensacola in rotations. Bragg took care to avoid provoking military action, ensuring that Pensacola remained a quiet sector during this period. A series of command changes began when Bradford resigned on 23 July, resulting in the promotion of Company D commander Jacques to major. Gladden was promoted to brigade command on 10 September and succeeded by Adams, allowing Jacques to move up to lieutenant colonel and Company A commander Frederick H. Farrar to major.

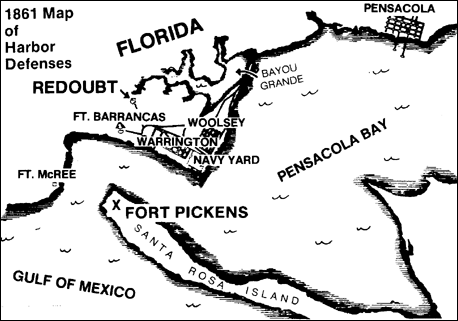
Pensacola Bay fortifications, 1861–1862

After the privateer schooner Judah was burned in a Union raid on the night of 13 to 14 September, Bragg launched a retaliatory sortie against the Union troops on Santa Rosa Island on the night of 8 October. For the Battle of Santa Rosa Island, Companies A and B of the 1st Louisiana, together with three companies from the 7th Alabama and two from the 1st Florida, formed the 400-man 2nd Battalion of the thousand-man force commanded by Brigadier General Richard H. Anderson. The battalion, led by Colonel James Patton Anderson, landed from a steamer along with the rest of the force on a beach four miles east of Fort Pickens. Patton Anderson was directed to advance south through the waist of the island and then turn west when he reached the south beach. This movement aimed to capture the Union pickets and isolate Fort Pickens from the camp a mile east of the fort where half of the 6th New York Infantry were located.

After a Union picket discovered the Confederate approach early in the morning of 9 October, their camp was charged by Colonel John K. Jackson's 3rd Battalion of the force and its occupants fled. Patton Anderson's troops joined Jackson's in looting the abandoned tents, while Union forces from Fort Pickens responded. To avoid being cut off, the Confederates retreated back to the beach to depart, but were delayed by a jammed propeller on one of the transports, allowing the Union pursuit to catch up. Crowded onto the decks of the transports, the Confederates were subjected to a withering fire, which they returned, and were able to get out of range after the propeller was freed. Company B lost one man killed, one died of wounds, and one wounded.

The Union commander struck back with a bombardment against the Confederate positions on 22 and 23 November. Companies G and H and a detachment of the regiment, all under the command of Jacques, manned the batteries at the Navy Yard and opened up a return fire, but did not inflict much damage on Fort Pickens due to lack of gunnery practice caused by shell shortages. Adams held the troops not needed to serve the guns in readiness to repulse a possible Union landing. Fort McRee suffered severe damage, but the Navy Yard batteries were relatively untouched. Pensacola remained quiet for the next few weeks until 1 January 1862, when a steamer docking at the Navy Yard drew Union fire, causing the inebriated Richard Anderson, in command while Bragg was away on inspection, to order a return bombardment. When Bragg returned he reprimanded Anderson, who had apparently forgotten about the inferiority of the Confederate artillery exposed in the November exchange, for wasting ammunition.

== Shiloh ==
=== Movement to Corinth and scouting ===
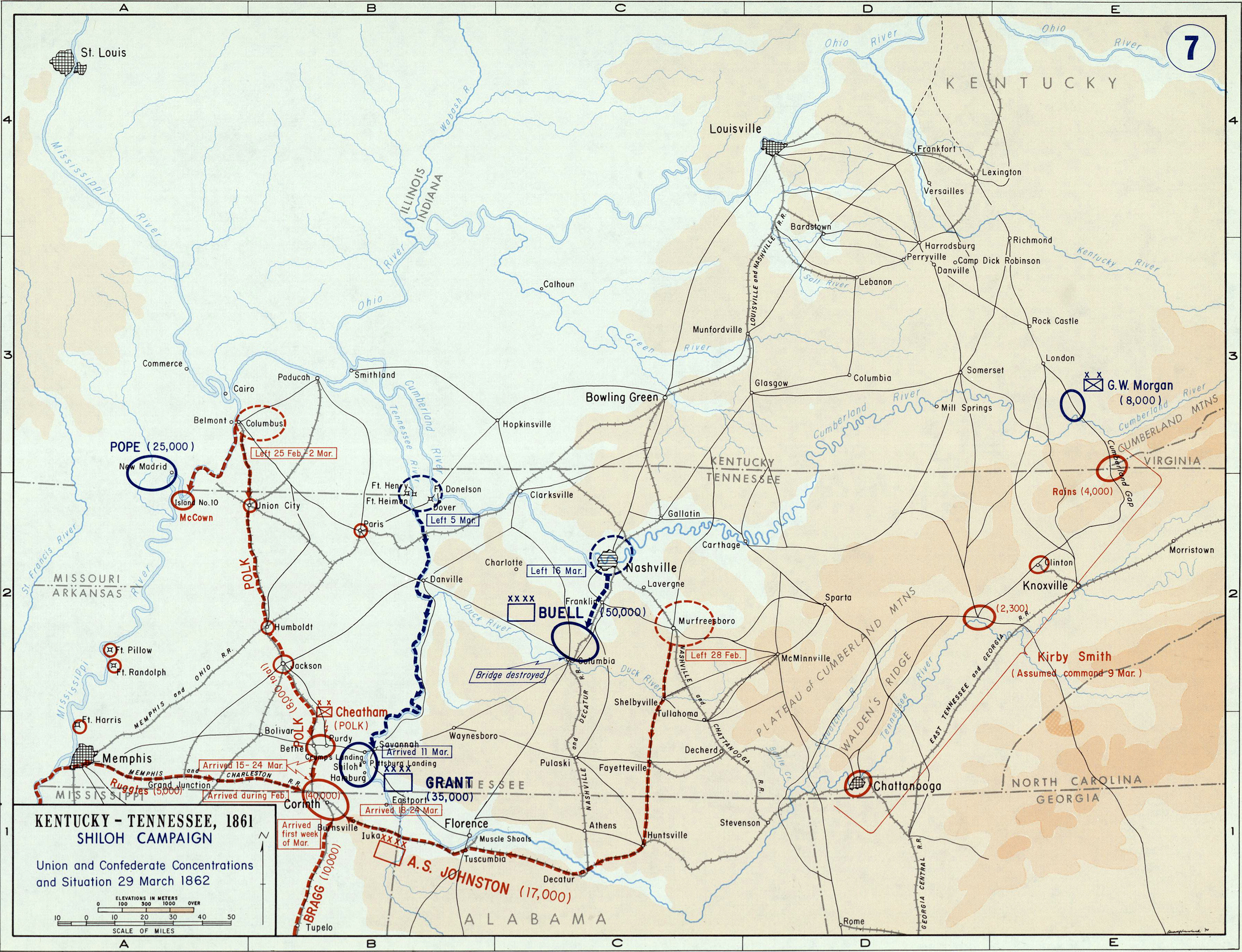
Initial movements of the Shiloh Campaign

After the fall of Fort Donelson on 16 February, the Tennessee River was opened up for a Union advance against the critical rail junction of the Memphis and Charleston and the Mobile and Ohio Railroads at Corinth, Mississippi. To prevent the capture of Corinth, which linked the Atlantic and the Mississippi River, the Confederate forces at Pensacola were ordered to be pulled out and sent to Corinth, where the Army of Mississippi was to concentrate under Albert Sidney Johnston. Delayed by heavy rains that washed out bridges, the 1st Louisiana Regulars entrained aboard the Mobile and Ohio on 27 February, together with the 18th and 22nd Alabama. The regiment arrived at Corinth by 9 March, when they were assigned with the 18th and 22nd Alabama to a brigade under the command of Adams as Gladden was given command of the division composed of the troops from Pensacola. At Corinth many of its men got drunk after boring holes in the floors of saloons to get at whiskey barrels and made mayhem, being punished by bucking and gagging.

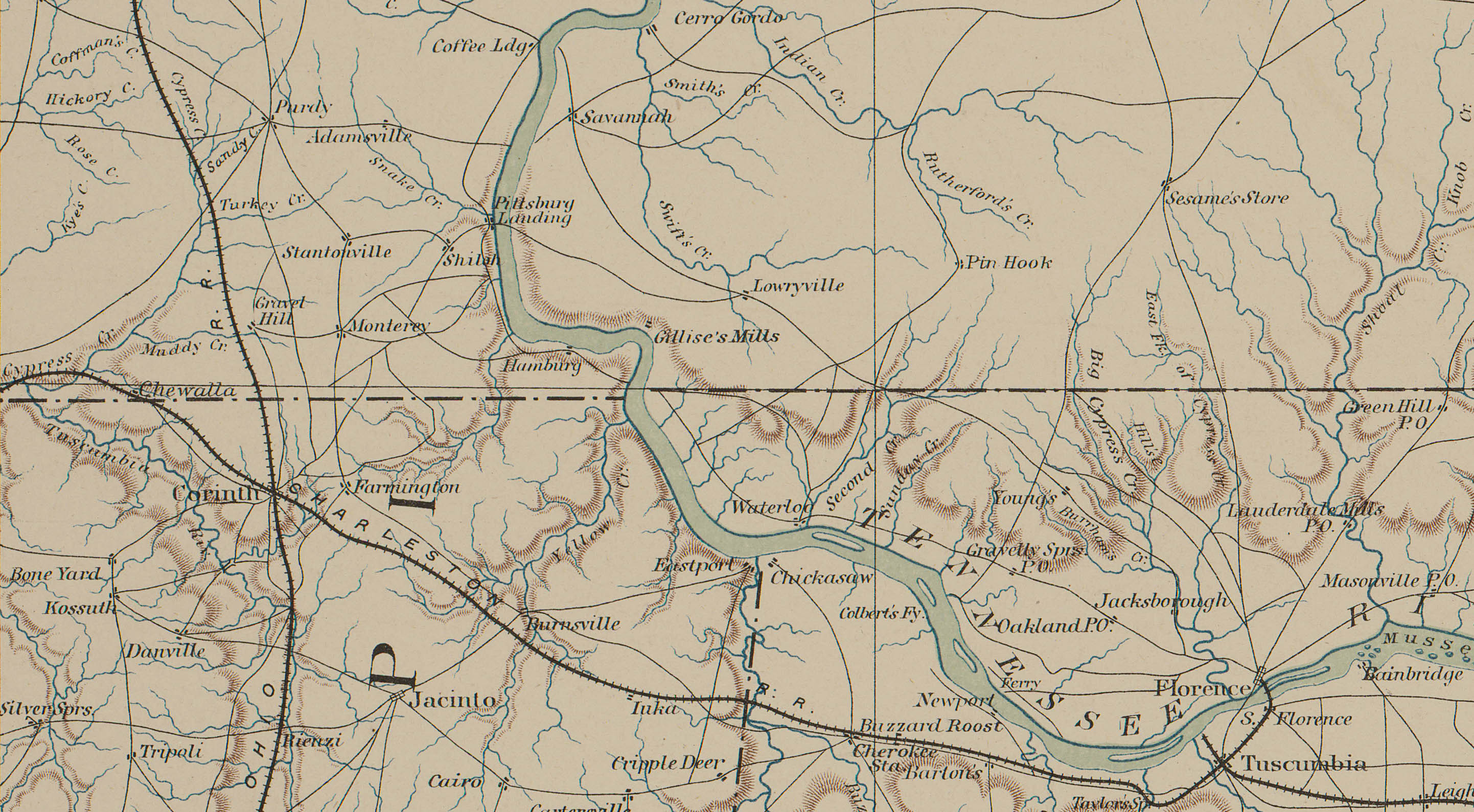
The Tennessee-Alabama-Mississippi tristate area, showing route of the Mobile and Ohio Railroad north from Corinth

When Lew Wallace's division debarked at Crump's Landing on 13 March, Adams led a detachment that reconnoitered the Union positions, burning cotton bales owned by Unionists. Wallace sent out cavalry on the same day to conduct an expedition towards the Mobile and Ohio Railroad near Purdy, Tennessee, where Gladden had stationed 700 infantry of the regiment and the 22nd Alabama; the cavalrymen skirted Purdy to damage a bridge before Wallace reembarked.

Union General William Tecumseh Sherman's division, attempting to cut the Memphis and Charleston Railroad, landed at Tyler's Landing near Yellow Creek on 14 March, sending out companies from the 5th Ohio Cavalry to conduct reconnaissance. The latter drove in the pickets of Jacques' detachment of the regiment watching the area. Jacques decided not to engage due to the small size of his force and retreated to Farmington due to lack of rations and heavy rains. The rains made the roads in the area impassable, forcing Sherman to turn back before achieving his objective. In the next two weeks, five divisions of Ulysses S. Grant's Army of the Tennessee encamped on the western bank of the Tennessee River at Pittsburg Landing, but the Union troops did not entrench, not expecting an attack. There, they awaited the arrival of Don Carlos Buell's Army of the Ohio pending an attack on Corinth.

=== Prelude and 6 April ===
Johnston decided to attack before Buell could arrive, and on 3 April the regiment left Corinth with the army. For the Battle of Shiloh, the regiment was part of Gladden's brigade of Brigadier General Jones M. Withers' division of Bragg's corps, together with the 21st, 22nd, 25th, and 26th Alabama. After marching along crowded, packed roads, Bragg's corps arrived in its starting positions for the battle on 5 April. The corps was tasked with attacking behind William J. Hardee's corps against the Union left to turn the opposing flank and cut Grant's army off from the Tennessee River. Gladden's brigade moved forward to take position in Hardee's line, partially filling a gap between the end of the latter and Lick Creek, with the 1st Louisiana positioned on the far right.

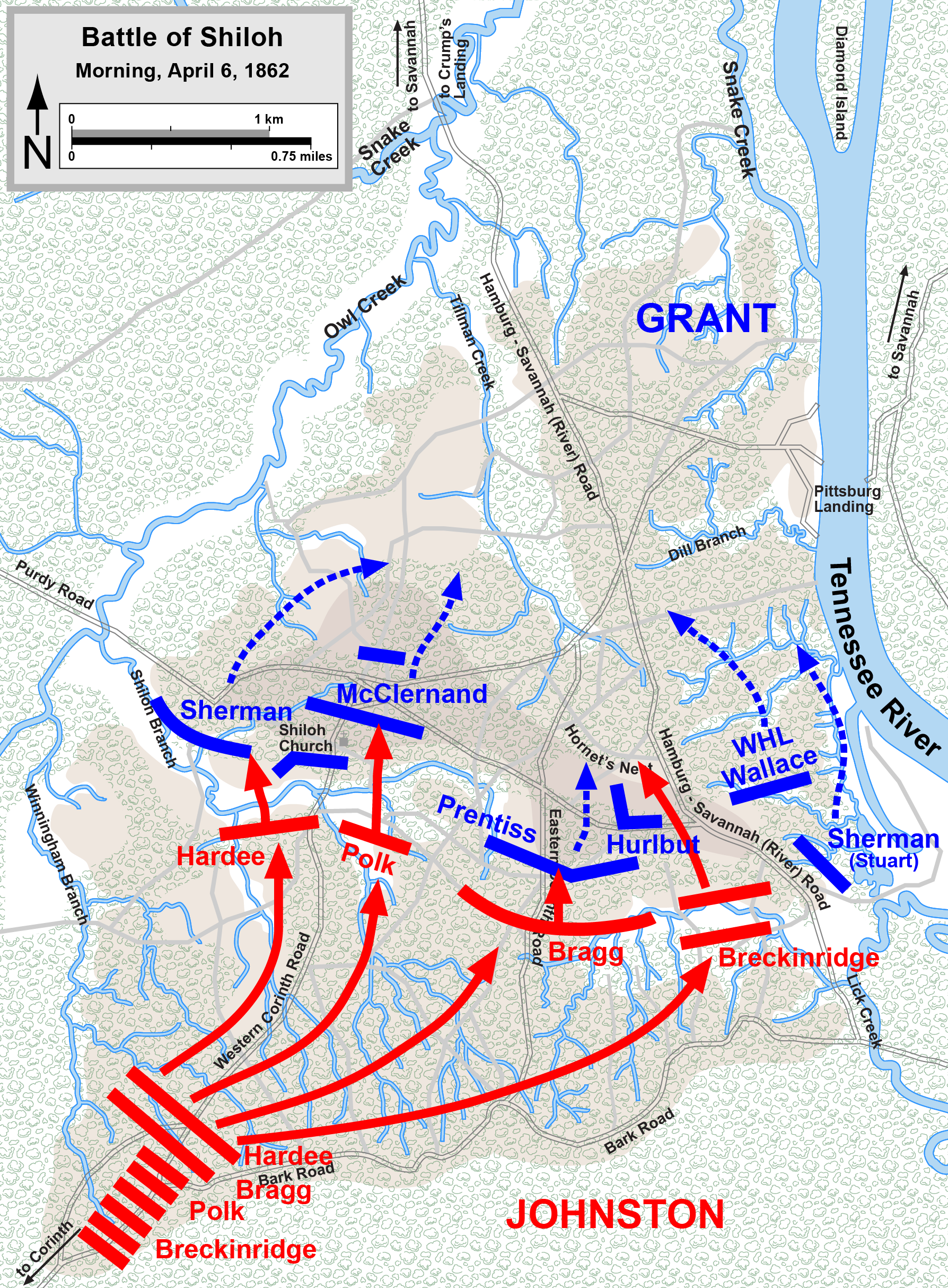
Situation at Shiloh on the morning of 6 April, note that Gladden's brigade attacked on the right of Hardee's line

When Gladden's brigade began its attack around 08:00 on the next morning against Colonel Madison Miller's brigade of Benjamin Prentiss' division, the Union troops were not surprised as the battle had already been in progress for some time. Advancing toward the open Spain Field up a gradual rise, the brigade was exposed to volleys from Miller's brigade, which inflicted heavy losses. Gladden was mortally wounded leading the 26th Alabama, which had become disorganized due to the terrain in the march to the battlefield and come up on the right of the 1st Louisiana. Adams took command of the brigade, which retreated under the pounding, covered by Robertson's Alabama Battery. In the absence of Jacques, Farrar became acting regimental commander.

Chalmers' brigade came up on the right, outflanking Miller, and Adams, holding the colors of the 1st Louisiana, ordered an advance at the double-quick against the 18th Missouri and 61st Illinois on Miller's right, supported by the fire of Robertson's battery. The outnumbered Union troops broke under the pressure of Chalmers' and Gladden's brigades, abandoning their tents, where men of the 1st Louisiana captured seven stands of colors. The regiment lost 28 killed and 89 wounded in the initial fighting; among the dead was Company G Captain John Thomas Wheat, the former secretary of the Louisiana secession convention. Prentiss' division quickly unraveled and the Confederates paused to loot the abandoned camp.

Johnston, moving forward to direct the action, incorrectly believed that he had found the Union left and began the anticipated turning movement. Gladden's brigade was ordered out of the camp shortly after 09:00 and pushed forward to exchange fire at long range against W. H. L. Wallace's division, deploying for battle. After Johnston learned of Gladden's wounding, he pulled the brigade back and replaced it with John K. Jackson's brigade. The brigade, positioned in reserve in Prentiss' camp to reform, later formed square in the erroneous anticipation of a Union cavalry attack.

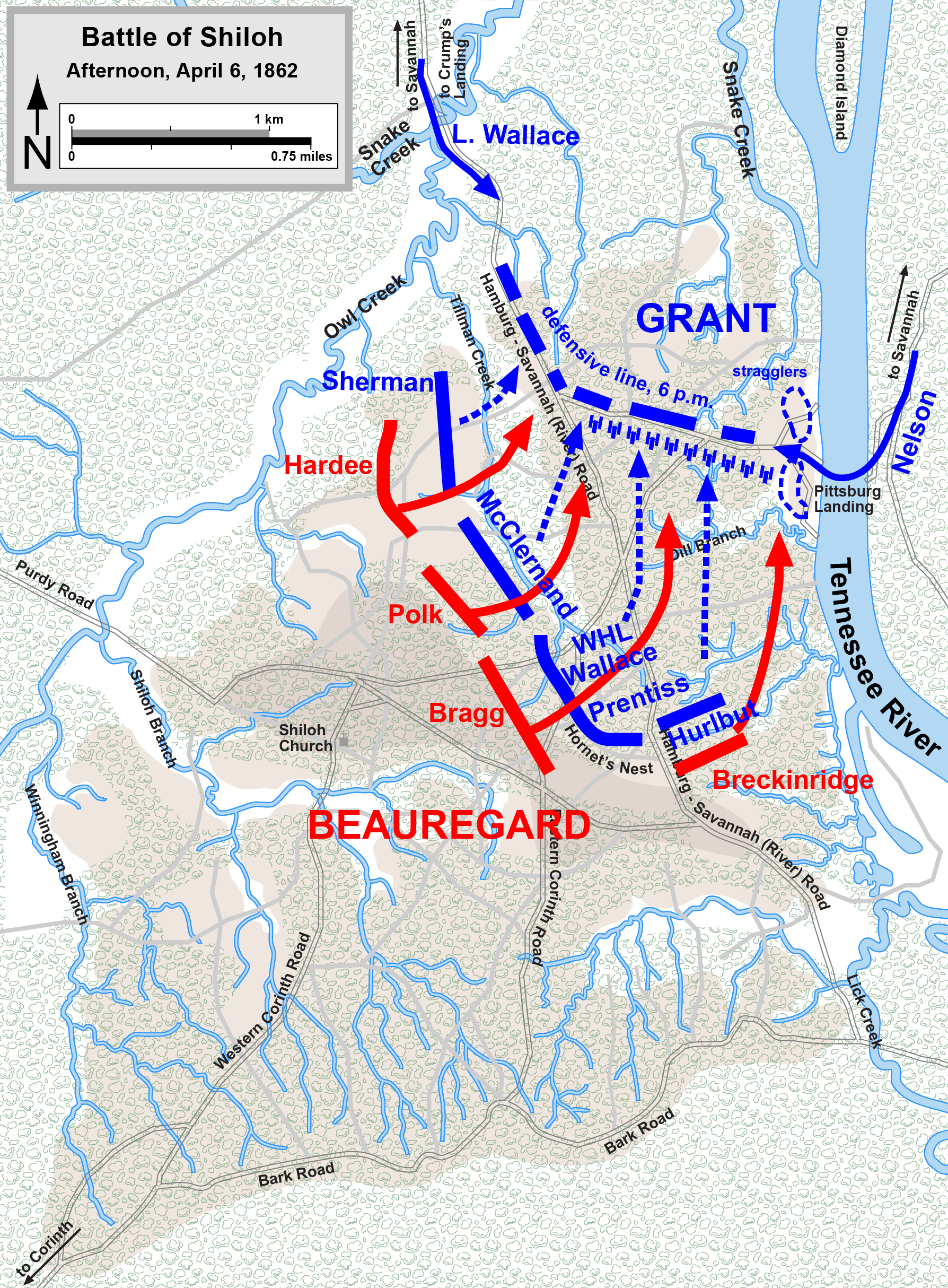
Shiloh, afternoon of 6 April

In the next several hours the regiment and its brigade replenished their ammunition. Adams was wounded about 11:30 and command of the brigade fell to 22nd Alabama Colonel Zachariah C. Deas. In the late afternoon, the brigade participated in the flanking and encirclement of Prentiss' reformed division at the Hornet's Nest, with the 1st Louisiana being ordered to advance by Bragg with the exhortation "My old bodyguard I see your ranks are thinner but enough are yet left to carry your flag to victory—Forward". They ran into stubborn resistance, but Prentiss' encircled troops surrendered around 17:30.

As the day came to a close, the 1st Louisiana and 22nd Alabama left behind the other three regiments and advanced under Deas' command when Bragg ordered a final assault at 18:00, with the Louisianans on the right to the left of Jackson's brigade. They crossed the deep Dill Branch ravine, "hugging the ground" to dodge artillery fire, which stopped forward progress. General P. G. T. Beauregard, who had taken command of the army after Johnston was mortally wounded in the afternoon, soon ordered a halt to rest for the next day. With the regiments exhausted and low on ammunition, Deas encamped the two regiments to the rear for the night, finding the Louisiana Regulars with just 101 men present for duty and the 22nd Alabama similarly reduced.

=== 7 April ===
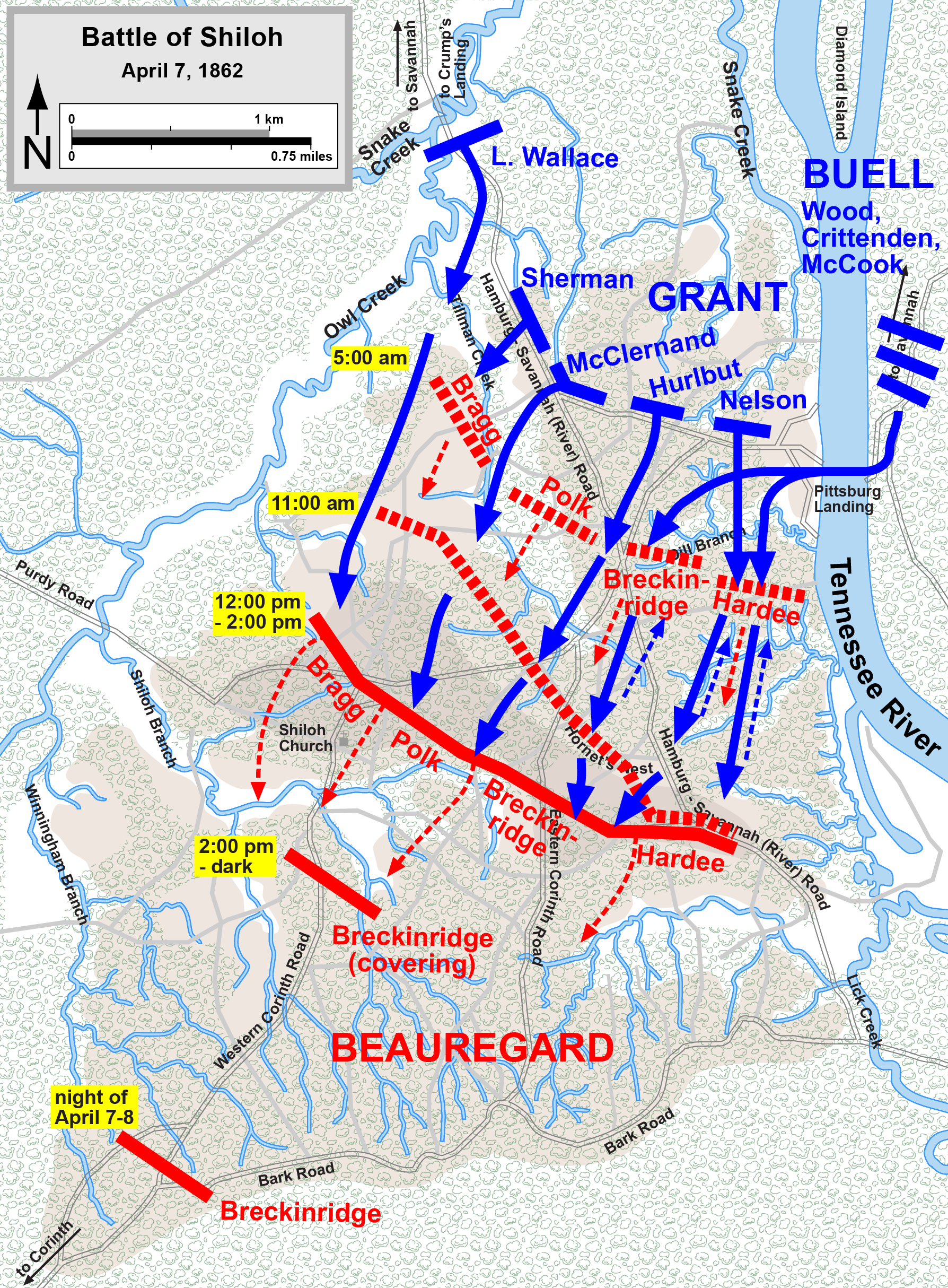
Shiloh, 7 April

While the Confederates spent a wet and uncomfortable night, Buell's army and Lew Wallace's division reached the field, the latter from Crump's Landing. The Union troops counterattacked on the morning of 7 April and Deas brought the 1st Louisiana and 22nd Alabama up on the left of Colonel Robert Russell's Tennessee brigade after 10:00, holding the far left of the Confederate line west of the Jones Field towards Owl Creek with the regiment still to the left of the Alabamians. Bragg, separated from his corps, commanded the troops on this section of the Confederate line, and Russell took command of a composite division that included the regiment.

Deas' regiments were advancing when skirmishers from Lew Wallace's division outflanked them, forcing a retreat. In intense fighting amidst the hills and valleys of the Crescent Field, they engaged two brigades of Wallace's division for half an hour, with attacks failing against the weight of the Union numbers. The regiments were steadily forced back until 13:00, when Wallace outflanked them again. Falling back, they participated in Beareaugard's final attack launched at 16:00, buying time for the Confederate retreat, with Deas' command reduced to roughly 60 men. With the army, the 1st Louisiana retreated back to Corinth, unpursued by the victorious Union troops. In the two days of the battle, the regiment suffered 232 casualties.

== Corinth ==
After the Battle of Shiloh ended, Adams was promoted to command of another brigade. Jacques succeeded him as colonel on 23 May, with Farrar becoming lieutenant colonel and Company F Captain James Strawbridge, a prewar lawyer, major. Brigadier General Franklin Gardner took over command of Deas' Brigade after Shiloh. The regiment's term of service was extended for two more years by the Confederate Conscription Act on 16 April. It went on to participate in the Siege of Corinth that began on 29 April. During the withdrawal from Corinth, Colonel Joseph Wheeler took over command of the brigade, which formed the Confederate rear guard, mounting a series of skirmishes and burning bridges to delay the pursuing Union troops. A detail led by Lieutenant Butler from the 1st Louisiana Regulars finished the destruction of a bridge over the Tuscumbia on the night of 29 May before the retreat ended at Tupelo. By 30 June, the regiment was assigned to Colonel Arthur M. Manigault's Brigade of Withers' Reserve Corps as part of Bragg's army, but was on detached duty. In July, Bragg entrained the infantry of the army for Chattanooga, Tennessee via Mobile, while the regiment marched there overland with the army wagon trains. When the 21st Louisiana Infantry Regiment, its strength much reduced by disease and desertion, was disbanded by Bragg's order on 25 July, the 1st Louisiana Regulars received at least 99 men from the regiment. These men ultimately proved unreliable as a high percentage of them later deserted or took the oath of allegiance to the Union after being captured. Earlier that month, Companies G and H of the 21st Alabama, composed mainly of men of French and Spanish descent from Mobile, had also been transferred to the 1st Louisiana Regulars. However, an officer from their regiment described them as "not worth a continental shin-plaster for any duty or a fight."

== Invasion of Kentucky and Stones River ==
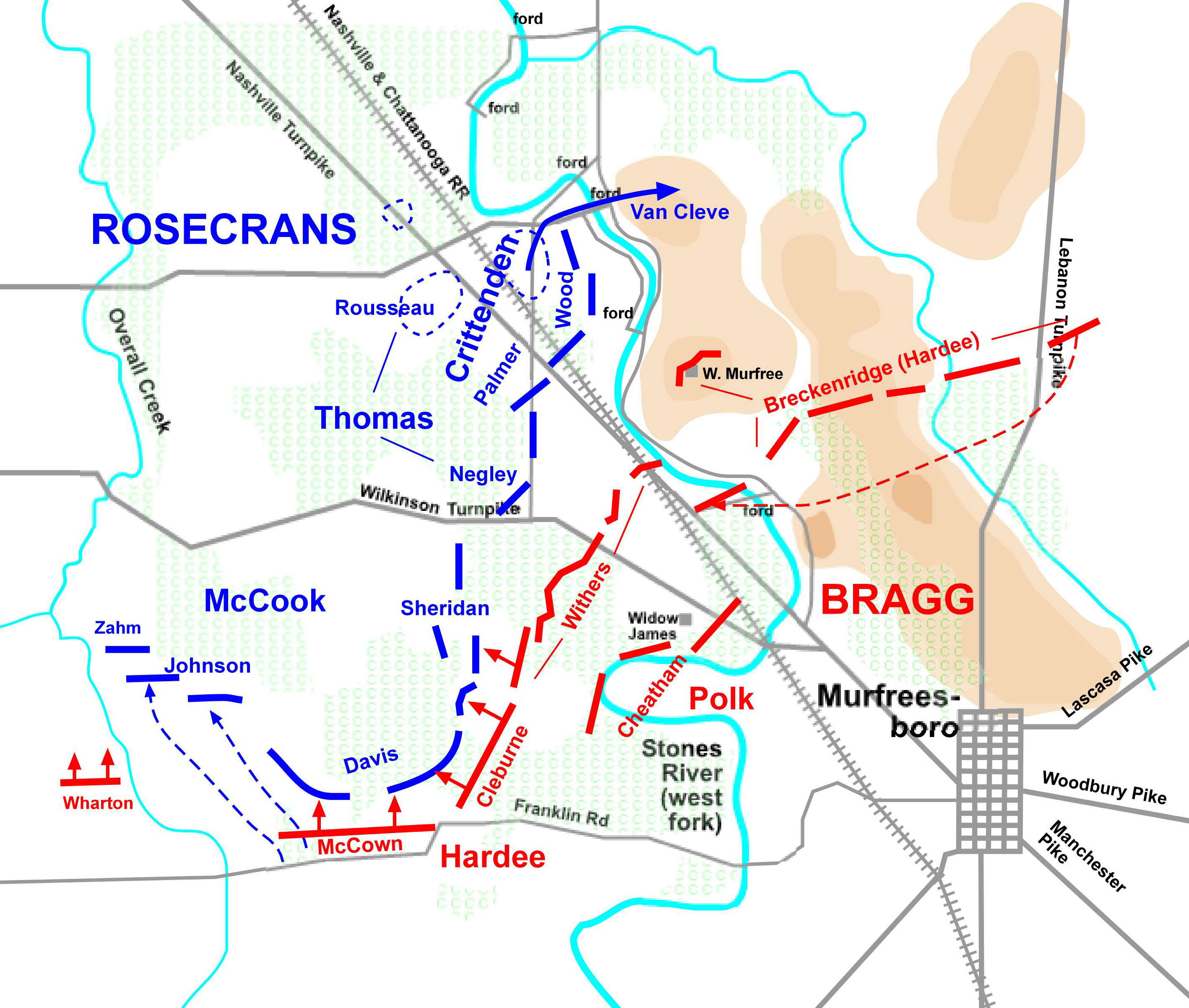
Stones River, 8:00 a.m. on 31 December

The 1st Louisiana Regulars were part of Deas' Brigade in Withers' Division during the Confederate invasion of Kentucky between 28 August and 19 October. It missed the Battle of Perryville because Withers' Division was detached to support other Confederate forces near Lexington on the day before Perryville, 7 October. The regiment retreated into Tennessee with the army and encamped at Tullahoma.

At the beginning of the Battle of Stones River, Deas' Brigade was commanded by Colonel John Q. Loomis. The brigade was shuffled last-minute into Benjamin F. Cheatham's Division of Leonidas Polk's Corps. The Confederate plan had the division attacking together with Cleburne's division to surprise the Union troops, but Cheatham's drunkenness delayed his attack until long after Cleburne had begun the battle. Instead of coordinating his division's attacks, Cheatham sent his brigades in piecemeal. Loomis' Brigade was the first sent into the attack an hour behind schedule at 07:00 on the morning of 31 December. Charging across an open field and up the rocky slope of a wooded hill with the 25th Alabama on their left and the 19th Alabama on their right, the 1st Louisiana struck the 24th Wisconsin of Sill's Brigade. A Wisconsin officer described the Louisianans: "Their banners flying, and uttering a horrid yell, they advanced heeding neither shot, shell or bullet." The 24th Wisconsin's right was exposed by the neighboring 25th Illinois and 81st Indiana from Woodruff's Brigade who routed in the face of the Alabamians. The 24th Wisconsin soon followed, managing to only respond with a "few scattered shots," and the 1st Louisiana pursued. However, the Confederates could not exploit their initial success as Woodruff's Brigade had rallied, throwing back the 26th, 39th, and 25th Alabama Infantry on Loomis' left while the 19th Alabama was stopped by the determined resistance of the 36th Illinois on the 24th Wisconsin's left. As Union batteries came up and the 36th Illinois counterattacked, Loomis was wounded, control was lost, and the 19th Alabama "swept away" by the onrushing Illinoisans. As a result, a brigade staff officer ordered Captain Taylor Beattie of the regiment to retreat back across the valley. Out of the 231 men under Beattie's command when the attack began, only 127 were left at the end of the engagement.

Colonel John G. Coltart took over brigade command as it retreated into the woods on the other side of the valley, but it was effectively out of the fight. Meanwhile, Cheatham wasted the rest of his division, Vaughan's and Manigault's Brigades, in further piecemeal attacks. Only when Woodruff's Brigade began running out of ammunition were the remaining brigades of the division finally able to make headway against the Union right. Later that day, during the battle for the Round Forest, Jacques, who had deserted the 1st Louisiana, rode up to Colonel Egbert E. Tansil of the 31st and 33rd Tennessee of Brigadier General Alexander P. Stewart's Brigade. Claiming to be on Cheatham's staff, Jacques ordered a retreat. Tansil obeyed, and the entire brigade followed. When the error was discovered, Jacques was arrested, but whether he experienced a breakdown "could not be determined."

On the night of 2–3 January, Coltart's Brigade, having been shifted back to Withers' Division, was moved up to support Chalmers' Brigade under Colonel Thomas W. White in preparation for a renewed attack on the Union positions in the Round Forest. The Union troops were forced out by the attack of Coltart's Brigade that morning, and both sides skirmished throughout the day. At dusk, the Union troops attacked through rain into the Round Forest again with two regiments from Beatty's brigade and Spears' fresh brigade following an artillery bombardment from Van Pelt's battery. Farrar, having just arrived to take command of the 1st Louisiana Regulars, was mortally wounded in this action. Coltart's and White's Brigades were forced to retreat by the attack, losing 48 captured, but the Union troops abandoned their gains an hour later, allowing the Confederates to reoccupy their old positions. Fearing Union reinforcements and with the rising Stones River threatening to split his army, Bragg decided to retreat and Withers' Division began moving out from the battlefield on the morning of 4 January.

The regiment suffered 102 casualties at the Battle of Stones River. For his conduct at Stones River, Jacques was court martialed and cashiered on 13 February, being replaced as colonel by Strawbridge. Strawbridge, having moved up to lieutenant colonel after Farrar's death, became the final colonel of the regiment. Major F. M. Kent became lieutenant colonel and Company H Captain S. S. Batchelor, a prewar dentist, became major.

== Chickamauga ==
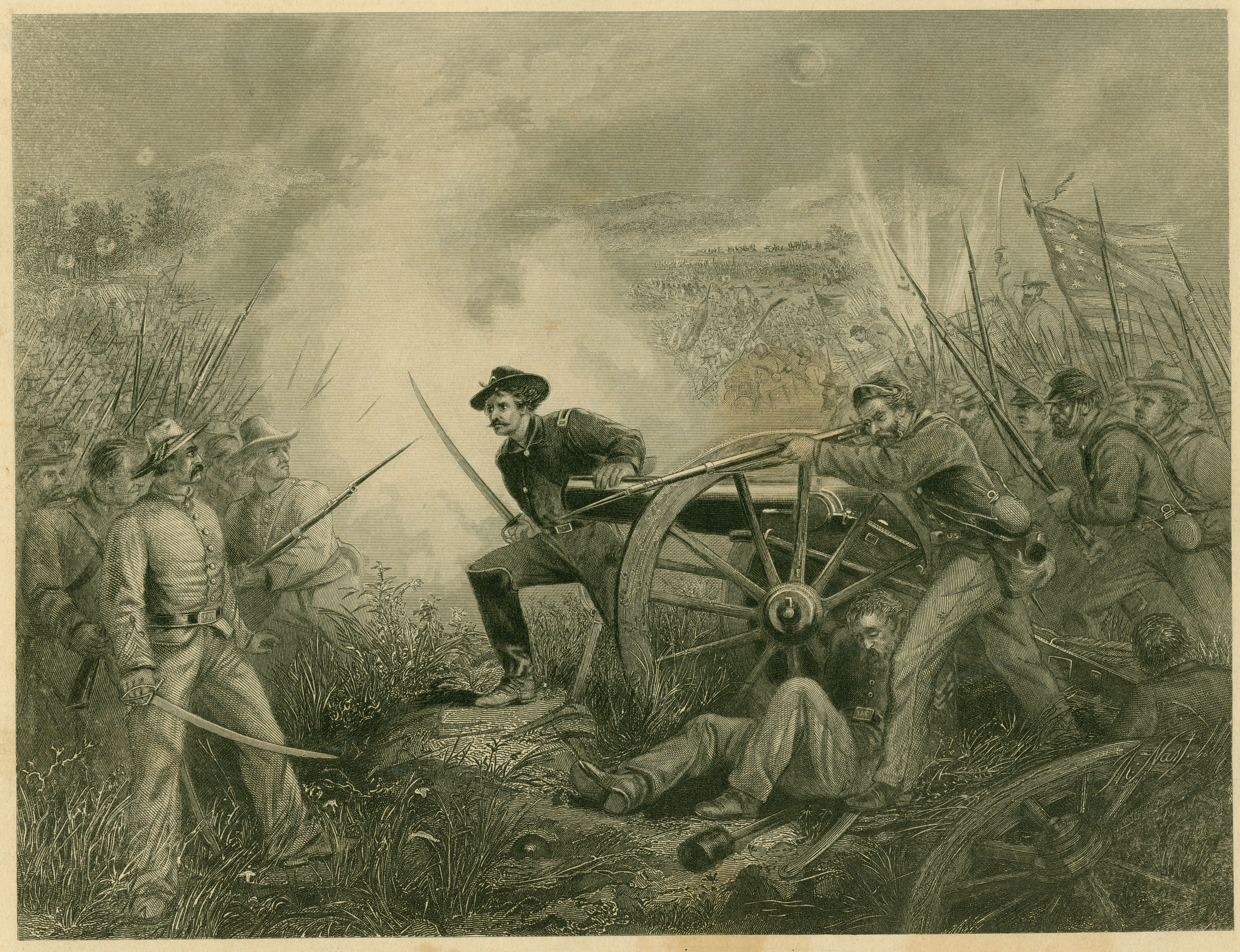
A contemporary depiction of Lieutenant Van Pelt defending his battery

The regiment was placed on provost duty on 10 January, due to its heavy losses. It was responsible for maintaining security in the army rear in this capacity. One example of its duties during this period was an unsuccessful expedition of 100 men drawn from the regiment under Batchelor's command to heavily Unionist Jackson County, Alabama between 9 and 14 April in an attempt to arrest a band of deserters and draft evaders. By June, the regiment had been reduced to four companies, becoming a regiment in name only, and a number of now surplus officers transferred out, including Company K Captain Robert Cobb Kennedy. After supporting the army reserve artillery in the spring and summer of that year, including during the Tullahoma campaign, the 1st Louisiana Regulars were temporarily consolidated with the 8th Arkansas Infantry on 25 August and fought under this arrangement in the Battle of Chickamauga between 19 and 20 September. The unit was commanded by Colonel John H. Kelly of the 8th Arkansas and Strawbridge was placed on staff duty. At Chickamauga, the consolidated 8th Arkansas-1st Louisiana were part of Liddell's Brigade, commanded by Colonel Daniel Govan, in Liddell's Division of Walker's Reserve Corps. Kelly moved up to brigade command just before the battle and Lieutenant Colonel George Baucum succeeded him in command of the combined regiments.

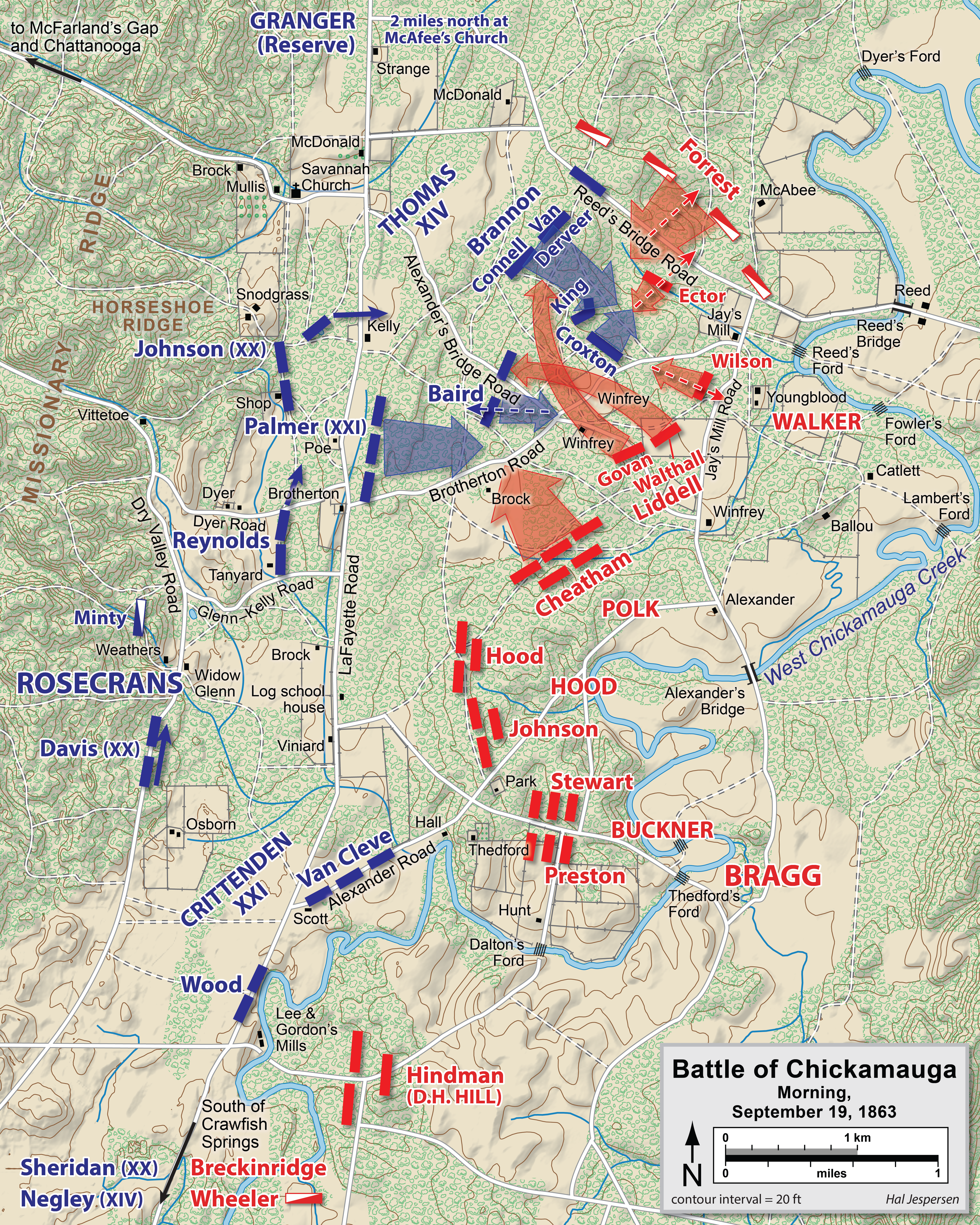
Chickamauga, morning of 19 September

At 11:30 on the morning of 19 September, Govan's troops advanced through the forest in a single line to cross the Brotherton Road, with the consolidated 5th and 13th Arkansas and the 1st Louisiana to the right of the 8th Arkansas in the center. They surprised the unprepared regiments on the right of Scribner's Brigade on the far side of the Winfrey Field, with the 8th Arkansas and 1st Louisiana overrunning Van Pelt's Battery and killing or capturing its gunners. During the action, Baucum was wounded and command passed to Major Anderson Watkins of the 8th Arkansas. As Walthall's Mississippi Brigade charged on the right against Scribner's left, Govan's Brigade supported them with a deadly enfilading fire. Scribner's Brigade disintegrated with 400 of the Union troops surrendering, and Govan's Brigade continued onwards to attack Starkweather's Brigade, which was even more unprepared with its regiments facing east while the Confederates came up from the south. Starkweather's Brigade was defeated within minutes and the Arkansans and the 1st Louisiana found themselves in possession of the 4th Indiana Battery's guns. Govan's Brigade had just descended the hill deserted by Starkweather's Brigade when they found themselves engaging Croxton's Brigade, but panicked after half an hour when outflanked on the right by the Union troops. The brigade was forced to pull back and abandoned its gains. Govan's and Walthall's Brigades attempted to attack through the Winfrey Field again at 3:30 p.m. as the day drew to a close. Walthall's Brigade had no more fight left and did not press the attack, while Govan's brigade "broke and ran" when outflanked by Baldwin's brigade.

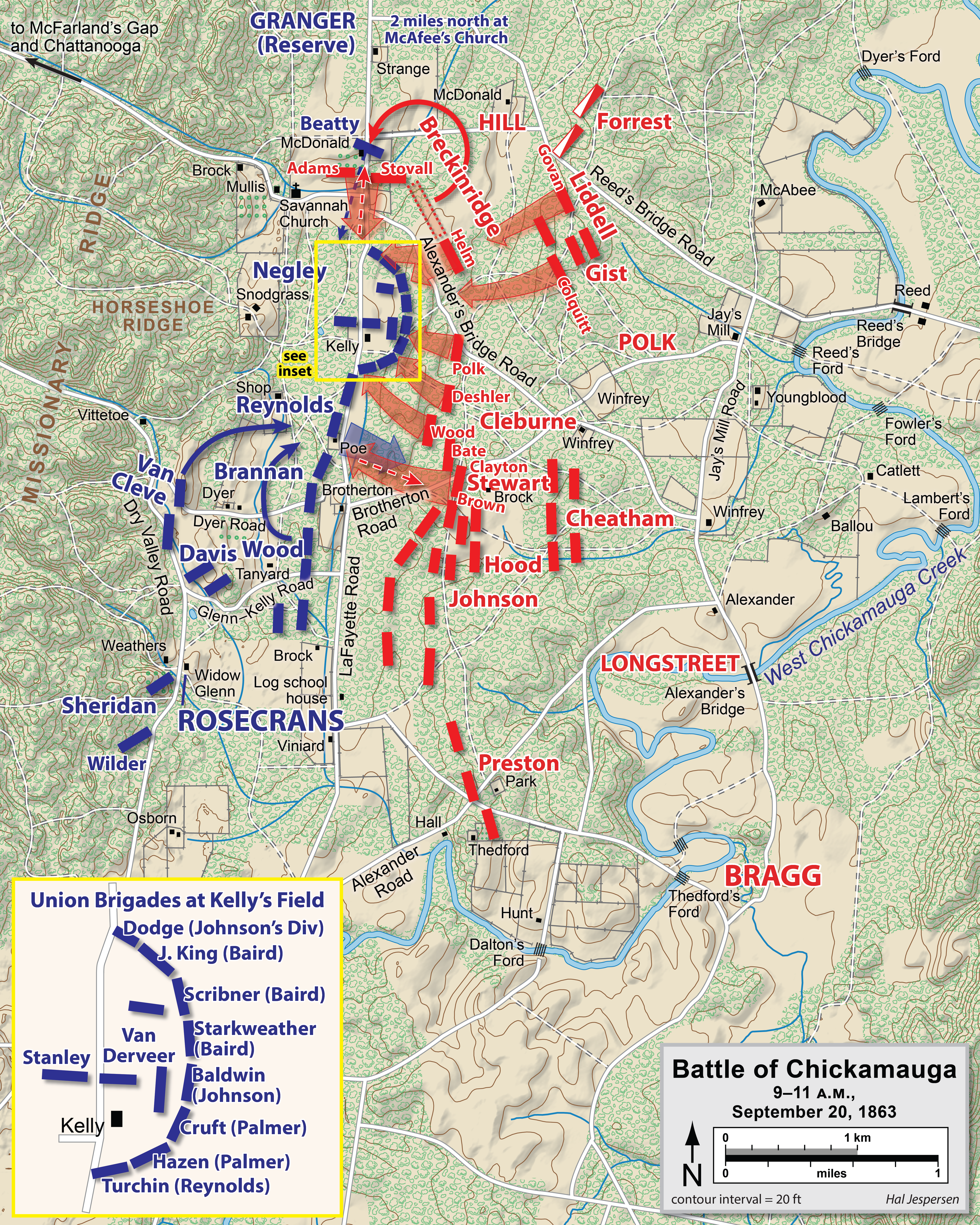
Chickamauga, morning of 20 September

After 11:45 a.m. on 20 September, Govan's and Walthall's brigades were committed again in an attempt to turn the Union left. The 5th and 13th Arkansas and the 1st Louisiana engaged Stanley's Brigade in the Kelly Field while the rest of Govan's troops to their left outflanked and routed Dick's Brigade. Barnes' Brigade counterattacked, flanking the 6th and 7th Arkansas, who quickly panicked. As the pursuing troops of Barnes' Brigade came close to cutting off Govan's retreat, the brigade shifted west into the Mullis farm fields to escape capture. For the next hour and a half Govan's Brigade moved through territory they had not previously covered until reaching Confederate lines at 2:00 p.m. Retracing their steps from the morning attack, Govan's Brigade moved west at 4:45 p.m., threatening the Union retreat route along the McFarland's Gap road. Captain James W. Stringellow of the 1st Louisiana spotted Turchin's brigade coming up against Govan's exposed left flank while on the skirmish line, but had barely time to warn Govan. Unable to prepare to face the assault, the brigade unraveled again. Walthall's Brigade disintegrated just as rapidly in the face of Turchin's advance. Subsequently, the bulk of the Union troops were able to retreat, but Bragg had his first clear victory. The gains of Chickamauga would prove illusory as the Confederates were unable to strategically exploit the battle's result. In his report, Watkins recorded casualties of 14 killed, 92 wounded and 65 missing out of an estimated 43 officers and 344 enlisted that entered battle with the combined regiments: almost half of the 8th Arkansas and 1st Louisiana had become casualties at Chickamauga.

== Atlanta Campaign ==
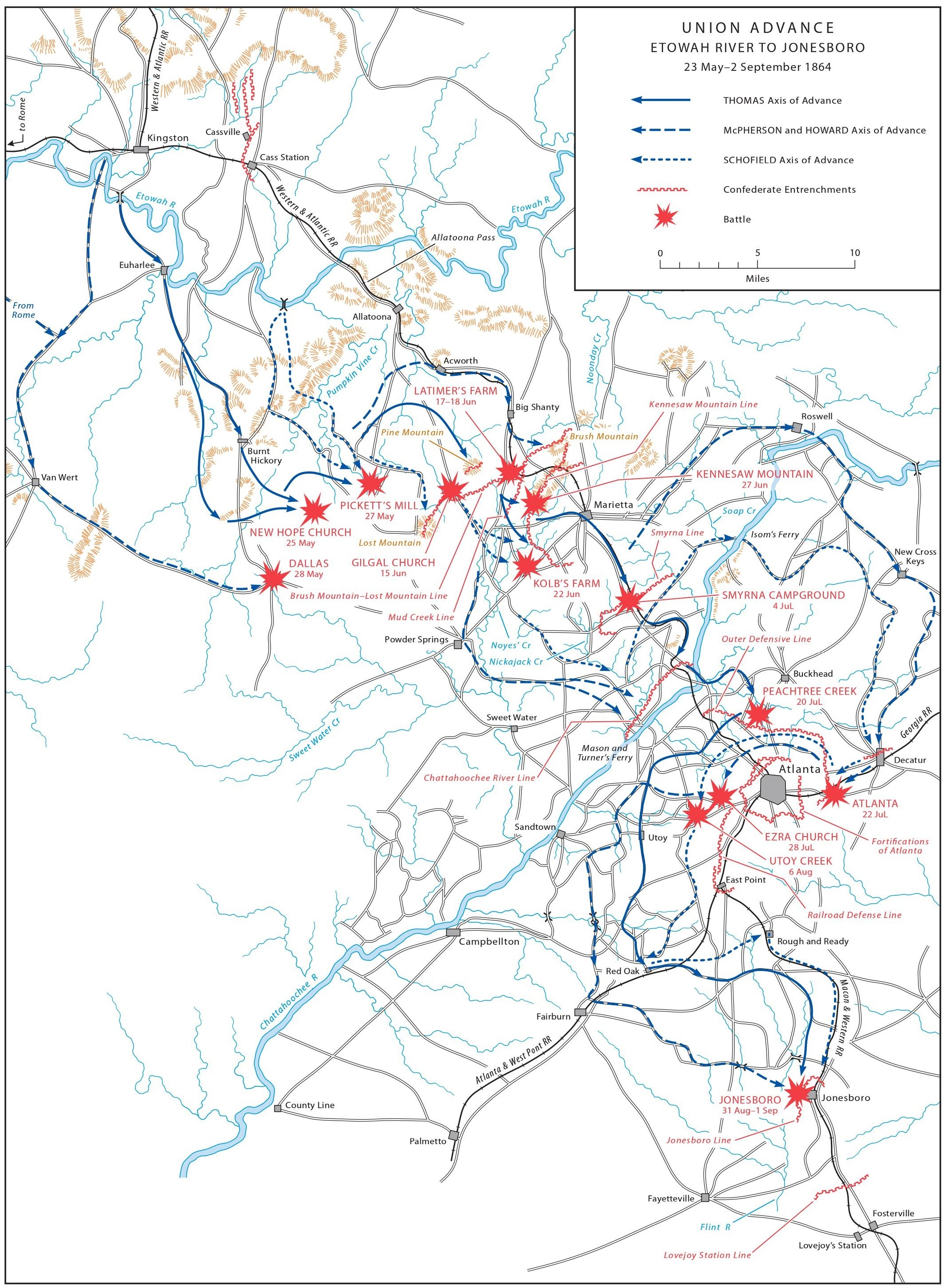
Atlanta Campaign, 23 May–3 September

Reduced to less than a hundred men by their losses at Chickamauga, the 1st Louisiana Regulars were detached from the 8th Arkansas and assigned as army headquarters guard during the Chattanooga campaign. Defeated in the Chattanooga campaign, the Army of Tennessee retreated to Dalton in northwest Georgia, where it spent the winter and early spring of 1863–1864. Bragg resigned as a result of the defeat and was succeeded by Joseph E. Johnston. The effective strength of the 1st Louisiana Regulars dwindled even further to 57 men by January 1864, when Strawbridge unsuccessfully requested permission from Confederate Adjutant General Samuel Cooper for the regiment to return to Louisiana so that it could be brought back up to strength. The combat losses of the regiment could not be replaced due to the breakdown of the prisoner exchange system and the resulting increasing tendency of Confederate prisoners of war to end their participation in the war by taking the Union loyalty oath or switching sides outright. While continuing army headquarters guard duty into the early spring of 1864 at Dalton, the effective strength of the regiment rose to a hundred men by early April. Kent died on 2 April and was replaced by Batchelor; Company I Captain Douglas West became major. Batchelor was left in command of the regiment after the transfer of Strawbridge to command the Madison garrison in 1864. On 16 April, the regiment was attached to the Louisiana Brigade of Brigadier General Randall L. Gibson at his request; it would serve in this unit for the rest of the war.

The Atlanta campaign began in early May when William Tecumseh Sherman's armies invaded Georgia. In response, Gibson's Brigade, under Stewart's Division of John Bell Hood's Corps, was posted on Rocky Face Ridge on 7 May and spent several days skirmishing there before Sherman outflanked the Army of Tennessee. Johnston was forced to retreat to Resaca, where he ordered he attempted a counterattack against elements of Joseph Hooker's XX Corps on 15 May. The brigade was in the second line of the division and only fired one volley before the engagement was called off. Johnston continued the retreat, with Gibson's brigade in the rear guard, to Cassville, where another abortive counterattack was prepared on 19 May. Outflanked again, Johnston fell back to Allatoona, with Sherman attempting a flanking movement towards Dallas. This resulted in the Battle of New Hope Church, in which the Louisianians again skirmished with Hooker's Corps on 23 May. The 1st Louisiana Regulars lost a total of thirteen men between 9 and 27 May: two killed, five wounded, and six missing, mostly to Union sharpshooters.

The brigade fortified its positions at New Hope Church and manned the trenches after being shifted to the right of the Confederate line on 28 May. After the retreat from New Hope Church when the Confederates were outflanked again, the brigade was constantly on the march until 18 June as Johnston attempted to cover his flank in the face of Sherman's advance. The brigade was in the lines around Marietta from 19 June to 3 July before the army retreated to the Chattahoochee River. The continuing Union advance forced the brigade back across the Chattahoochee, where it took up fortified positions at Peachtree Creek on 9 July. The regiment was involved in maneuvers in response to Union attempts to advance during the next two weeks. Being close to Atlanta allowed some men to visit the city, allowing the men of 1st Louisiana Regulars to acquire whiskey again: "all hands drunk" was the report at the unit's camp on 13 July. Due to losses, the 1st Louisiana Regulars were consolidated with the 13th and 20th Louisiana during the early Atlanta Campaign and by August were under Austin's Sharpshooter Battalion together with the 4th Louisiana Infantry Battalion.

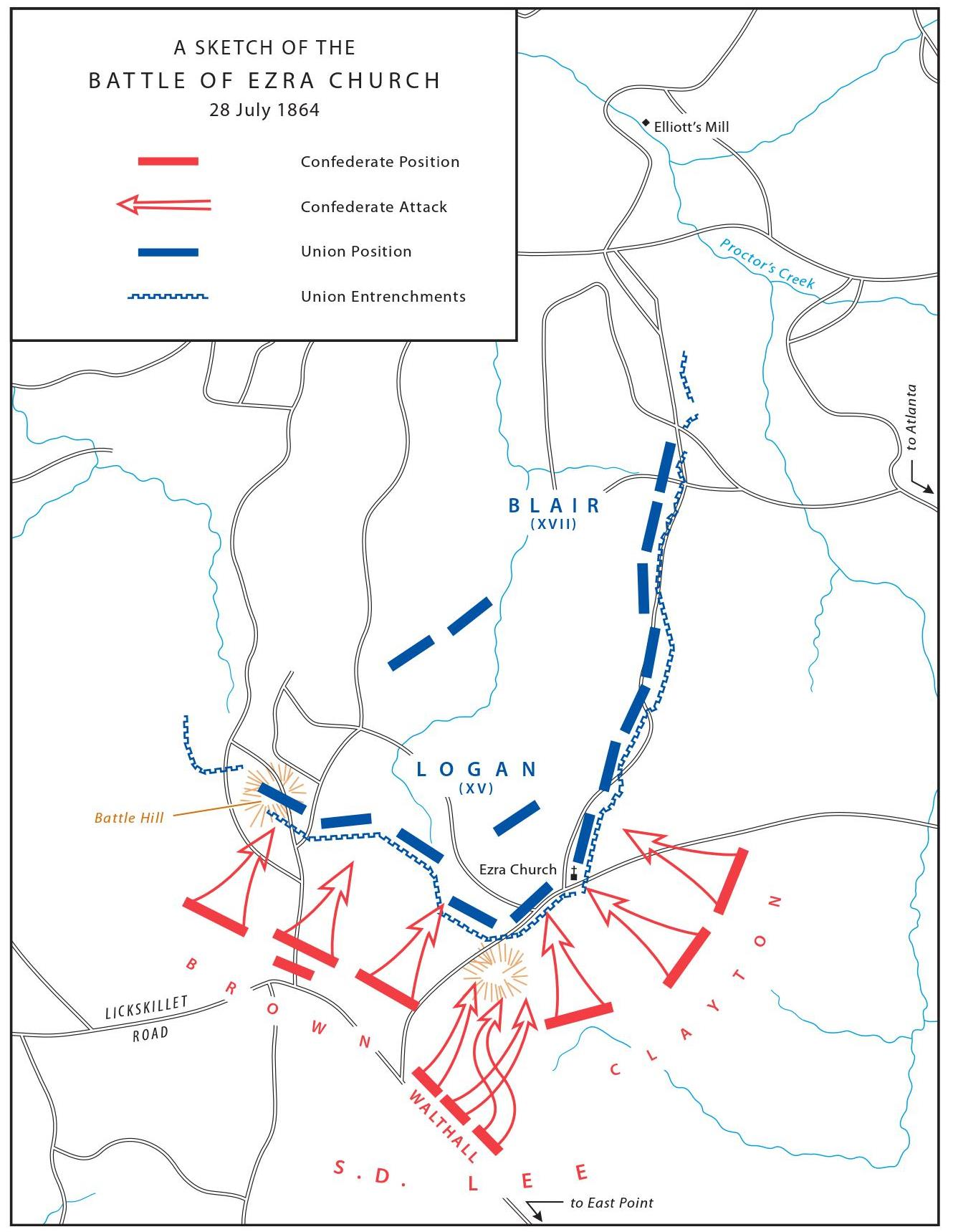
Ezra Church, 28 July 1864

Johnston was perceived as being insufficiently aggressive and replaced by Hood in army command on 17 July. Cheatham took over Hood's Corps and Henry Clayton had earlier succeeded Stewart as division commander. The brigade was not engaged during Hood's attacks at the Battle of Peachtree Creek on 20 July and the Battle of Atlanta two days later. Lieutenant General Stephen D. Lee replaced Cheatham on 27 July, and on the next day Hood sent Lee's Corps to counter Sherman's attack towards the Macon and Western, the last railroad into the city, beginning the Battle of Ezra Church. On the morning of 28 July, Colonel Leon von Zinken of the 20th Louisiana, whom Gibson had delegated command to before leaving to consult Clayton on his dispositions, ordered an immediate attack on the left in response to a staff officer dispatched by Lee to hasten the attack of Clayton's Division. Gibson was powerless to stop the brigade going into battle piecemeal, unsupported by the other brigades of the division. The left of the brigade struck the angle in the Union line formed by Wangelin's and Oliver's Brigades. Advancing through woods that limited their visibility, the Louisianians, as described by one of the 30th Louisiana's officers, were hit by a "terrific and destructive fire at short range" by two reinforcing regiments of Walcutt's brigade armed with breech-loading rifles that "mowed down" the left of the brigade when they emerged from the woods. The 30th Louisiana was virtually destroyed and the other units on the left suffered similarly heavy casualties, among them Captain William H. Sparks, who had succeeded to command of the 1st Louisiana Regulars by 30 June. The right of Gibson's brigade was only lightly engaged and attempted to advance, but lacking support was forced to retreat. Gibson did not report exact totals of his heavy casualties, but the brigade numbered 763 effectives on the day after Ezra Church, a decrease of 352 from 18 July. Soldiers from Wangelin's Brigade assigned to bury the Confederate dead left on the battlefield described bodies laying "in heaps." Sparks was succeeded by Lieutenant Charles L. Huger and then Lieutenant William P. Grivot. The command of the 1st Louisiana Regulars by these junior officers reflected the fact that it was by now at not much more than platoon strength.

The attack at Ezra Church managed to stall Sherman's advance against the railroad for a few days. Following the battle, Clayton's Division retreated to the Sandtown Road near Utoy Creek, southwest of the city, where it entrenched. Gibson's brigade was thinly spread in a single line over a broad sector, positioned on the extreme left of the division. The brigade fortified the sector with abatis and placed redoubts manned by three or four-man pickets within the line. Sherman renewed the attempt to isolate Atlanta completely by sending Schofield's Army of the Ohio against the Utoy creek positions in the Battle of Utoy Creek. Before dawn on 5 August, skirmishers from Gleason's Brigade surprised the pickets of the Louisianians and captured an estimated hundred men from the brigade. Schofield was unable to break through and the brigade would remain in the trenches at Sandtown Road under constant bombardment for the next month. This situation developed into routine with occasional temporary truces occurring in sections of the line.

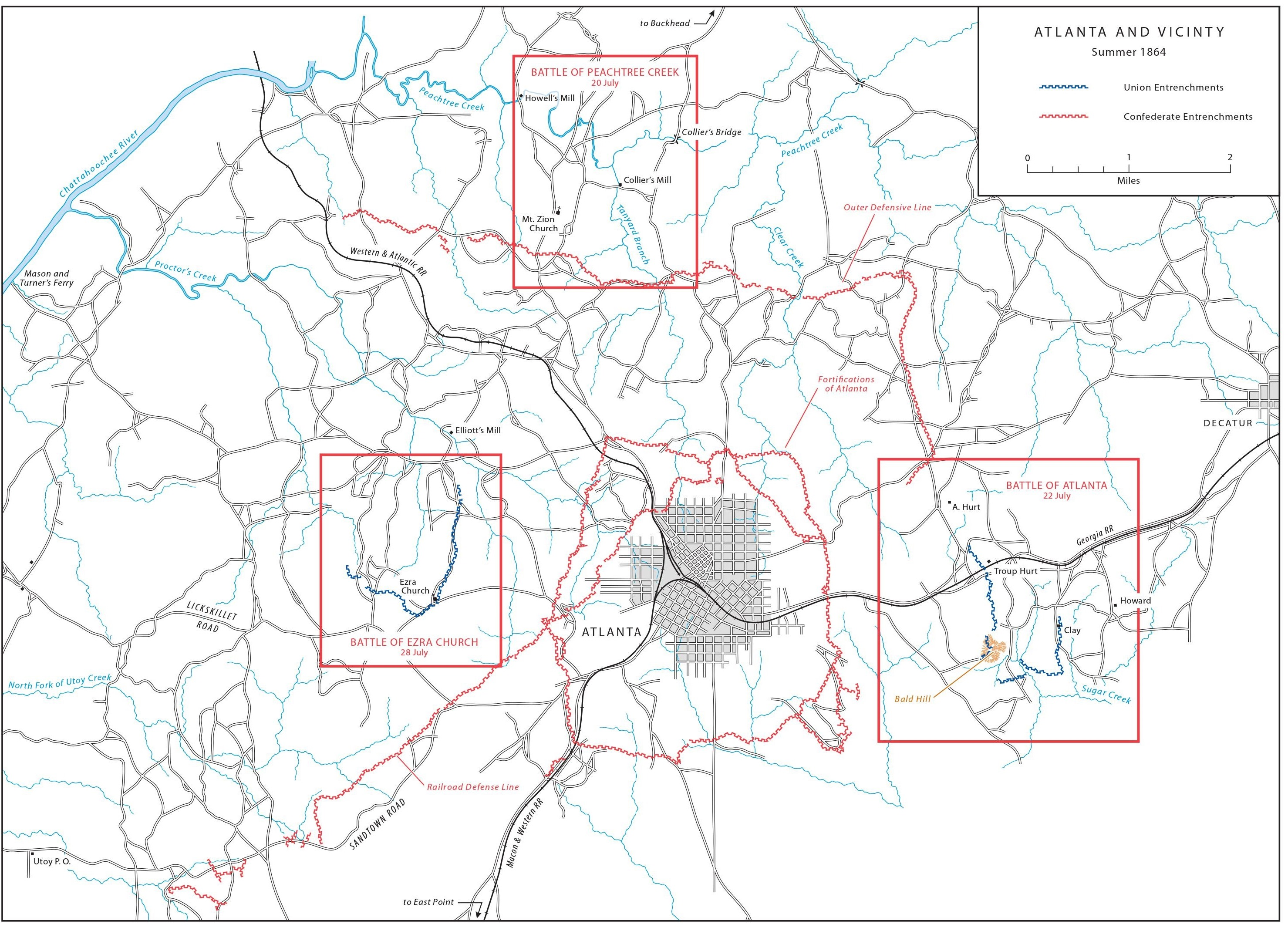
Positions during the Siege of Atlanta

Deciding to decisively end the siege of Atlanta, Sherman took his army out of the Union lines on 25 August and swung them to the west of the city against the Macon and Western Railroad. The Confederates were initially deceived, believing that Sherman had abandoned the siege. Hood did not respond until late on 30 August, when he dispatched Lee's and Hardee's Corps to Jonesborough to counter the maneuver. Clayton's Division made a tiring fourteen-mile march to Jonesborough, where Gibson's brigade was tasked with building fortifications parallel to the Macon and Western after it arrived at noon on 31 August. The Union troops had beaten them to Jonesborough and already strongly fortified their positions. The brigade was in the second line of the Confederate attack, west of the railroad, behind Deas Brigade, which was now in Anderson's Division of Hardee's Corps. The alignment of the 1st Louisiana Regulars regiment was not documented. On the right of the Confederate line, Deas' and Gibson's brigades faced Theodore Jones' and Wells Jones' brigades of Hazen's Division, supported by two batteries. Positioned on a hill, Theodore Jones' brigade was exposed in front of the main Union line which formed an angle where the brigades of both Joneses met.

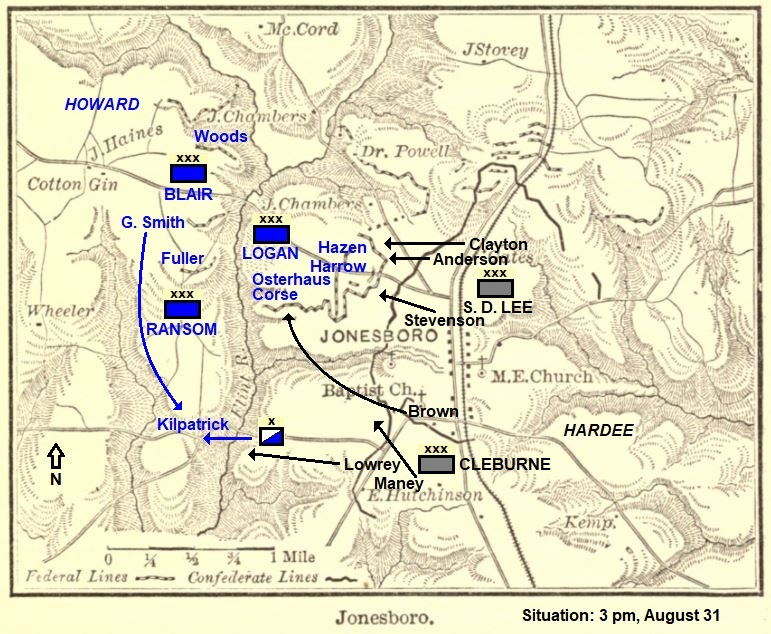
Jonesboro, 3 p.m. on 31 August

Deas' Brigade advanced against Theodore Jones' brigade when Hardee began the Confederate assault in the Battle of Jonesborough at 2:00 p.m. on 31 August, but retreated in the face of the Union fire, refusing to sacrifice themselves by charging the Union positions. As Deas' Brigade retreated, Gibson personally led the Louisiana Brigade into battle an hour after the attack began. Charging across an open field into the angle formed by the Union line, the brigade suffered heavy losses and few were able to actually reach the Union positions. Gibson reported after the battle that nearly half of the brigade had been killed and wounded within fifteen minutes. In the face of what Gibson described as "heavy and well-directed fire", the surviving men of the brigade stopped at the Union picket line to find cover, effectively ending the assault. Several brigade officers became casualties encouraging their men to attack, including the 20-year old Grivot, who died more than a month later of his wounds from the battle. The brigade retreated to its original positions, where Gibson rallied them to renew the attack, but Lee's Corps was pulled out of the fight by Hood to defend Atlanta from what he believed was another Union thrust later that day. Hardee's Corps was defeated on the next day, forcing Hood to evacuate Atlanta as the city was now completely isolated with the loss of the railway. Lee's Corps had not yet reached Atlanta when Hood turned them around to join the retreat.

== Nashville ==
After the fall of Atlanta, the brigade regrouped with the army at Lovejoy Station. The Louisianians departed the station on 18 September and marched west to Palmetto, where President Jefferson Davis visited the army to restore its morale. Hood attempted to attack Sherman's lines of communication and the army began marching north again on 29 September. The brigade reached Lost Mountain on 3 October, where it built breastworks while other troops attacked the railroad, where a division from Stewart's corps was embarrassingly defeated by the Union garrison at Allatoona. This forced Hood to abandon his axis of attack and the brigade returned to marching, participating in the unsuccessful attempt to force the Resaca garrison to surrender on 12 October. The Army of Tennessee was now in Sherman's rear, but its leaders were unwilling to risk a decisive battle and Hood turned southwest into Alabama to escape pursuit. Reaching Gadsden on 21 October, the troops of the army were finally able to receive new shoes and clothing after several weeks of marching which involved sleeping under only blankets in the cold and inadequate food supplies. Hood decided to invade Tennessee and the army marched northwest. At the crossing over the Tennessee River at Florence, the Louisiana Brigade quickly drove off the town's meager Union garrison from Croxton's Brigade on 30 October. The army halted there for nearly a month while Hood awaited the arrival of Nathan Bedford Forrest's Division in order to begin the Franklin–Nashville campaign in earnest, allowing the men of the brigade a respite from the constant marches. By this point, the 1st Louisiana Regulars were reduced to just 26 men under the command of Captain Samuel Sutter, while the total in the brigade was only 660, with 40 rounds of ammunition per man. The brigade was spared from Hood's costly attack at Franklin and since leaving Florence had only suffered from the privations of marching. On the outskirts of Nashville, the brigade took position on the right of the Confederate line, south of the city, in which it dug trenches as the weather turned increasingly cold while the men still had only blankets for shelter. Captain James C. Stafford became the final commander of the 1st Louisiana Regulars by 10 December.

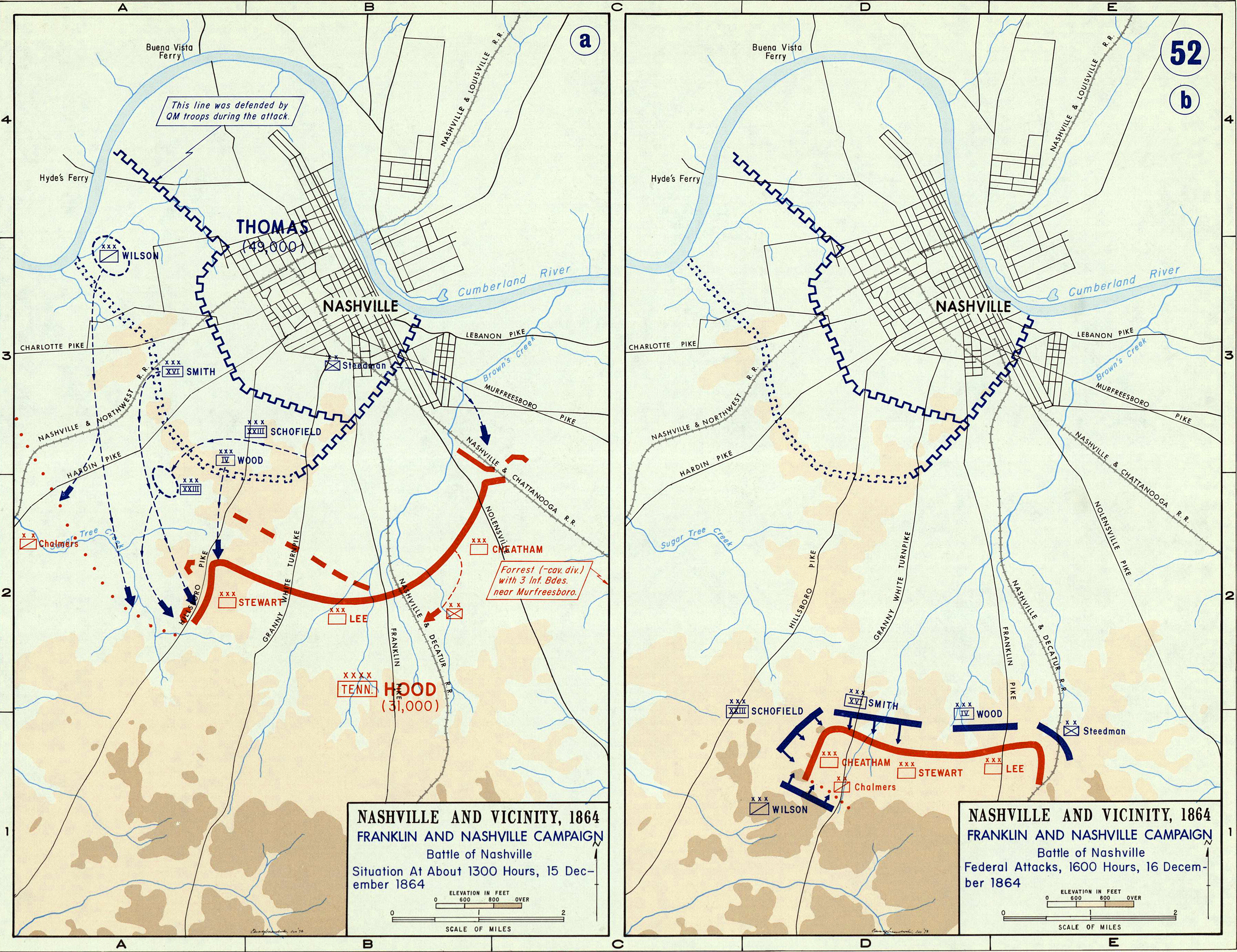
The Battle of Nashville, 15 and 16 December

The Battle of Nashville began on 15 December when Union army commander George Thomas attacked the left of the Army of Tennessee. The latter was unable to resist for long and at 2:00 p.m Gibson's brigade was sent to the extreme left of Lee's corps in order to prevent a disaster on the left flank. The brigade had to realign to address Union movements towards its left so that it was positioned at a right angle to Lee's position, but the end of daylight halted the Union advance before the brigade was seriously engaged. That night, Clayton shifted his positions to center them on the fortified Overton Hill, with Gibson's brigade on the left behind a stone wall across the Franklin Pike. By the afternoon of 16 December the Louisianians found themselves under constant fire from Opdyke's and Lane's Brigades in addition to artillery bombardment. Despite this, the Confederate defenders on Overton Hill were able to repulse the attack of Post's and Streight's brigades at 3:00 p.m. thanks to the abatis causing chaos in the Union advance. Their victory proved fleeting as Hood's line began to collapse from the left flank inwards, with "almost the entire army...running from the field." Gibson managed to reform his brigade to provide "token resistance" near the Overton House on Franklin Pike, a mile behind their original positions. The Army of Tennessee having suffered total defeat, its remnants headed for Franklin. Gibson's brigade formed part of the rear guard at Hollow Tree Gap, where it suffered heavy losses fighting its way to the Harpeth River north of Franklin to avoid destruction by pursuing Union cavalry on 17 December. South of Franklin Stevenson's Division took over the rear guard, but Gibson's Brigade was again called upon to drive off Union cavalry later that day with "a few volleys".

== Mobile and Surrender ==
For the next several weeks, the demoralized and often barefoot men of the brigade faced the rain, cold, and snow as they retreated into Alabama. On 6 January 1865, the brigade halted at Tupelo, which they had already seen following the evacuation of Corinth back in 1862. The Army of Tennessee was shattered by the Franklin–Nashville campaign, with the brigade reduced to only 262 men, having suffered large numbers captured. The regiment and its brigade departed for Mobile on 18 January, having to march to West Point in order to board the railroad for Mobile there on 1 February due to destroyed tracks. At Mobile, the brigade was quartered in "comfortable log huts," raising morale as they finally had a reprieve from the fighting. There, the regiment was consolidated with the 16th and 20th Louisiana Infantry and the 4th Louisiana Battalion during the month to form a combined unit under 16th Louisiana Colonel Robert Lindsay that totalled 103 effectives.

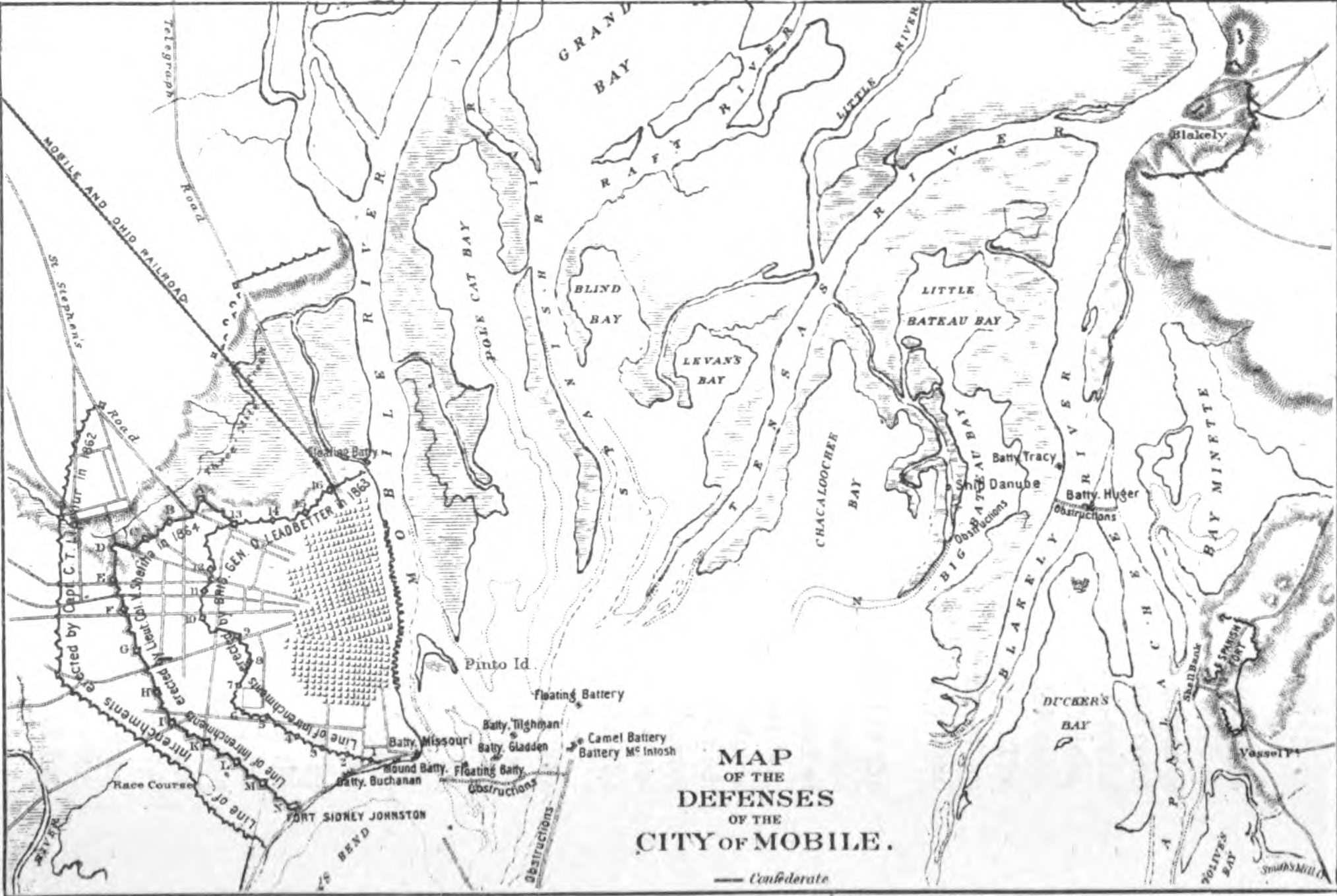
Confederate defenses of Mobile Bay

Union Major General Edward Canby landed his army to begin the Mobile Campaign in March. In response, Confederate commander Dabney H. Maury sent Gibson's brigade to garrison Spanish Fort on 22 March, but found it insufficiently defensible. The brigade "worked day and night" to improve the fortifications. In order to delay the inevitable attack Gibson decided to seize the initiative at the beginning of the Battle of Spanish Fort. Lindsay commanded a 550-man force in a predawn sortie on 27 March that drove in the Union pickets from Slack's Brigade of Veatch's Division, but were forced to retreat by two Union brigades. For the next several days, the brigade dug trenches outside Spanish Fort while under fire from the Union troops and artillery. Gibson grew increasingly desperate for replacements, even requesting enslaved laborers, and promised severe punishments for desertion. The Union troops broke through on 8 April and what was left of the Spanish Fort garrison evacuated by boat to Mobile. The loss of the forts forced the abandonment of the port itself and on 12 April Gibson's brigade found itself in the rear guard yet again covering the retreat. The brigade arrived by train at Meridian, Mississippi two days later, where its men finally received full rations. Full casualty numbers for the Mobile Campaign are unknown; the regiment reported that they suffered no casualties until the evacuation of Spanish Fort.

The brigade was sent east to Cuba Station with the remnants of Maury's command in late April. At Cuba Station, the brigade was reorganized due to the lack of men remaining, in which the 1st Louisiana Regulars were consolidated with the 4th, 13th, and 16th Louisiana Infantry Regiments and the 30th and Austin's Battalions to form the Chalmette Regiment under Colonel Francis Campbell, which totaled 186 men. Maury was ordered to prepare the army to march east in a desperate attempt to link up with Joseph E. Johnston's troops in North Carolina, but while at Cuba Station the Confederates received news of the surrender of Lee and Johnston's forces in the east. After a negotiated surrender announced on 6 May Maury took his command to Meridian for parole, from which men of the brigade dispersed back to Louisiana. At the final muster of the brigade, the 1st Louisiana Regulars numbered close to 35 men. During the war, the regiment's dead numbered 176 killed in action, 52 of disease, two by accident, one murdered, and two executed.

== See also ==
- List of Louisiana Confederate Civil War units
