= 22nd Alabama Infantry Regiment =

Infantry regiment of the Confederate States Army

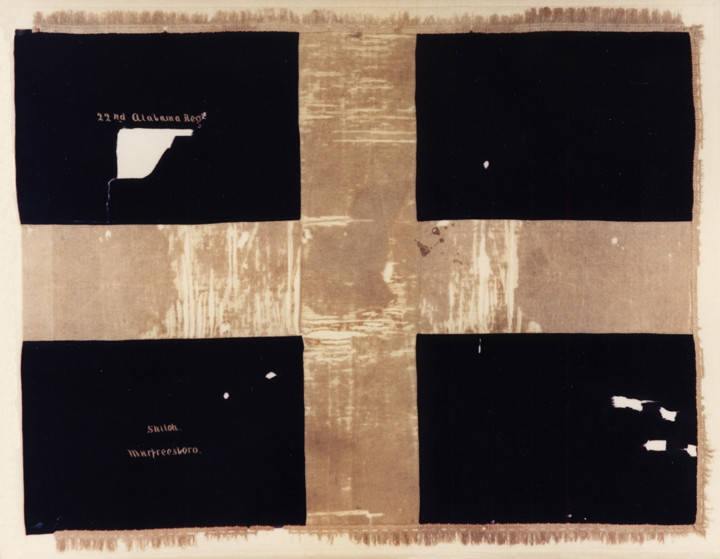
- Regimental color of the 22nd Alabama at the Alabama Department of Archives and History
- Active: 1861–1865
- Disbanded: April 26, 1865
- Country: Confederate States
- Allegiance: Alabama
- Branch: Army
- Type: Infantry
- Size: Regiment
- Facings: Light blue
- Battles: American Civil War; Battle of Shiloh; Battle of Perryville; Battle of Murfreesboro; Battle of Chickamauga; Battle of Atlanta; Battle of Franklin; Battle of Nashville; Battle of Bentonville

The 22nd Alabama Infantry Regiment was an infantry formation of the Confederate States Army in the Western Theater of the American Civil War.

== History ==
The regiment was organized at Montgomery, Alabama, November, 1861, and armed by private enterprise. It first served in Mobile, Alabama; from there it was ordered to Corinth, Mississippi, and reached Tennessee in time for the Battle of Shiloh, where it suffered severe loss. It fought at Munfordville, 14 to 16 September 1862; at Perryville, 8 October, and at Murfreesboro, 31 December to 2 January 1863. It took a very brilliant part in the impetuous assault on Rosecrans' army at the Battle of Chickamauga, 20 September, and suffered severely, losing almost two-thirds of its forces, the killed including five color-bearers. It served in the campaign in Georgia, losing heavily in the battles around Atlanta, Georgia, July, 1864, and at Jonesboro, 31 August and 1 September. It was also distinguished at Franklin, 30 November; at Nashville, 15 and 16 December; at Kinston, North Carolina, 14 March 1865, and at Bentonville, 19 to 21 March. In April it was consolidated with the Twenty-fifth, Thirty-ninth and Fiftieth, under Colonel Toulmin.

Colonel John C. Marrast passed away while still in the military, having achieved great success. At Shiloh, Captain Abner C. Gaines was fatally wounded and Major R. B. Armistead was killed. Lieutenants J. H. and J. N. Smith. Wall fell at Murfreesboro, Lieutenant Colonel John Weedon, Captain James Deas Nott and Lieutenants Waller Mordecai and Renfroe were killed at Chickamauga; Colonel Benjamin R. Hart, Captain Thomas M. Brindley, Lieutenants Leafy and Stackpoole at Atlanta, and Captain Ben. B. Little were killed at Jonesboro. The other field officers were Colonel Zach C. Deas, afterward a noted brigadier-general; Colonel Harry T. Toulmin, later U.S. district judge; Lieutenant Colonels Napoleon D. Rouse and Herbert E. Armistead; Majors Thomas McPrince, Robert D. Armistead and Robert Donnell.

=== 1861 ===
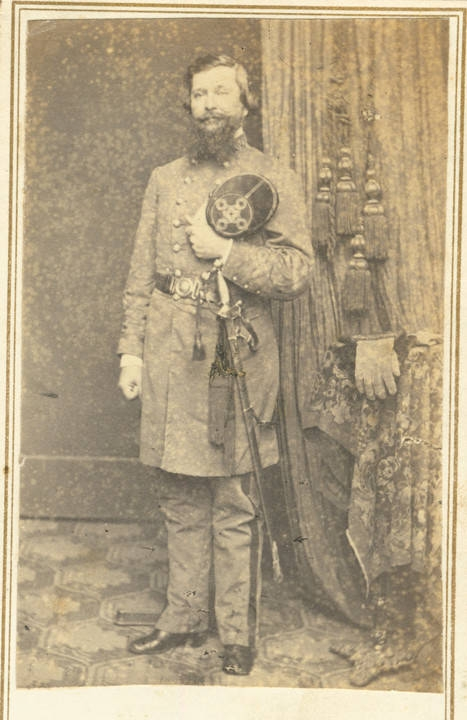
Col. Zachariah C. Deas

Company D was organized at Dublin, Alabama, and elected officers 17 September 1861 at Montgomery, Alabama. Company D and her sister companies were formed from men who were recruited from Calhoun, Cherokee, Choctaw, Clarke, Mobile, Montgomery, Pike, Randolph, and Walker counties. The 22nd Alabama Infantry Regiment was then organized by Major Zachariah C. Deas and Major Robert B. Armistead in Montgomery, Alabama, on 6 October 1861. On 25 October 1861, Major Deas was elected and commissioned colonel. Colonel Deas spent $28,000 in gold to equip the regiment with 800 Pattern 1853 Enfield rifles. On 5 November 1861, the 22nd Alabama was ordered to report to General Withers at Mobile, District of Alabama, where it encamped during that winter.

=== 1862 ===
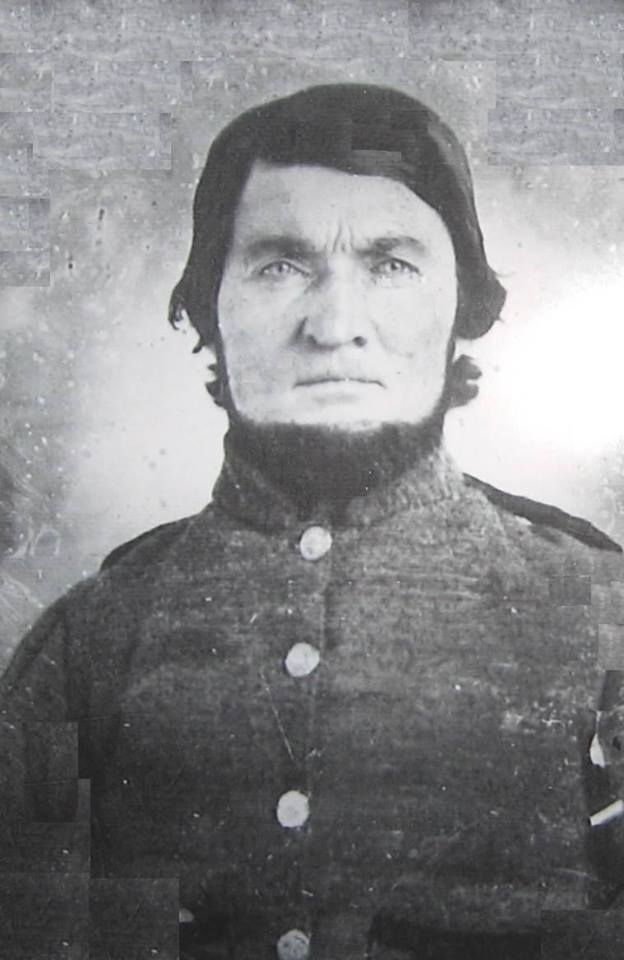
Pvt. Abner Columbus Ball, Company G, 22nd Alabama; killed at the Battle of Murfreesboro, Tennessee on 31 December 1862

Ordered to west Tennessee in January 1862, Major General Bragg transferred Brigadier General A. H. Gladden (of Louisiana) to Mobile, and created Gladden's Brigade including the 22nd Alabama. On 1 February 1862 the 22nd Alabama and her brigade were in the Department of Alabama and West Florida, in the Army of Mobile under General Withers. On 26 February 1862 the brigade (under Gladden) was ordered to Corinth, Mississippi by General Bragg. The 22nd Alabama was then engaged from 6 to 7 April 1862 in the Battle of Shiloh, where it operated under the 1st Brigade of Brigadier General Adley H. Gladden who was wounded and died on 12 April 1862. Colonel Deas later assumed command of the 1st Brigade temporarily until wounded himself on 7 Apr. During this engagement the 22nd Alabama and 1st Brigade were under the 2nd Division (commanded by Brigadier General Jones M. Withers) of the 2nd Corps (commanded by Major General Braxton Bragg) under the Army of Mississippi (commanded by General Albert S. Johnston). The 22nd Alabama suffered heavy losses, and reported 123 men fit for duty after the battle.

During April 1862 the 1st Brigade (with the 19th, 22nd, 25th, 26th/50th, and 39th Regiments) was placed under Brigadier General Franklin Gardner, who ultimately led this brigade into Kentucky. The 39th Alabama was absorbed at the railhead in Tupelo, Mississippi, south of Corinth. In May 1862 the brigade was camped a few miles north of Tupelo at the town of Saltillo, Mississippi. During Jun 1862 the brigade formed the 17th Battalion of Sharpshooters. On 30 Jun 1862 Gardner's Brigade was in a Reserve Corps of Bragg's Army. During August 1862 the 1st Brigade (and Army of Mississippi, under Bragg) was loaded into railcars at Saltillo & Tupelo and were transported south by the Mobile and Ohio Railroad to Mobile, changed trains, and transported north to Montgomery, West Point, Atlanta, then Chattanooga. By 18 to 20 August 1862 Gardner's Brigade was with Major General Leonidas Polk at Chattanooga. On 28 August 1862 the Army of Mississippi began its march to Kentucky and arrived at Munfordville, Kentucky, on 17 September 1862, where it was engaged in the Battle of Munfordville.

Following the battle the 22nd Alabama accompanied Bragg's Army of Mississippi as it continued its march into Kentucky, reaching Hodgenville and Bardstown in October, where on 4 October 1862 the regiment witnessed the inauguration of the Confederate governor of Kentucky at Frankfort. Shortly afterward on 8 October 1862 during the Battle of Perryville the 1st Brigade was held in reserve and not involved much in the battle except for some skirmishing.

On 9 October 1862 General Bragg reached Knoxville and renamed his army the Army of Tennessee. The 22nd Alabama stayed in Knoxville for a couple of weeks, until ordered to Murfreesboro, Tennessee. During November 1862 Brigadier General Gardner was promoted to major general and transferred to Port Hudson, Louisiana. Subsequently, on 13 December 1862, Colonel Deas was promoted to brigadier general. During this period, President Jefferson Davis reviewed the Army of Tennessee at Murfreesboro. Finally on 31 December 1862 Brigadier General Deas formally assumed command of 1st Brigade.

=== 1863 ===
From 31 December to 2 January 1863 the regiment fought fiercely in the Battle of Murfreesboro (also called Stone's River). The 22nd Alabama and the 1st Brigade fought under the 2nd Division (commanded by Major General Jones M. Withers) under Polk's Corps (commanded by Lieutenant General Leonidas Polk) under the Army of Tennessee (commanded by General Braxton Bragg). The 22nd Alabama suffered 94 casualties. After ferocious, bloody fighting in the Battle of Murfreesboro, ten gallant men from the 22nd Alabama were inscribed into the Confederate Roll of Honor:

- Company A: Sergeant W. D. Sumner
- Company B: Private William Sellers
- Company C: Corporal J. L. Husbands
- Company D: First Sergeant Benjamin Franklin Nelson
- Company E: Sergeant P. A. Minton
- Company F: Corporal N. B. Walker
- Company G: Private J. R. Black
- Company H: Corporal W. R. Larry
- Company I: Private J. J. McVey
- Company K: Private J. N. Eilands

Following the battle, 1st Brigade retreated to Shelbyville, Tennessee, where it was joined later by the rest of the Army of Tennessee. During the first half 1863 the Army of Tennessee occupied a front in southern Tennessee from Shelbyville to Tullahoma. The 1st Brigade now commonly referred to as Deas Brigade, and remained under Wither's Division and Polk's Corps. At the end of July 1863 Deas' Brigade evacuated the Shelbyville and Tullahoma area and pulled back to Chattanooga, Tennessee due to flanking by Union Army, and then during August the Army of Tennessee occupied Chattanooga.

From 6 to 7 September 1863 the Army of Tennessee evacuated Chattanooga and marched southward, where it participated from 18 to 20 September in the Battle of Chickamauga. During the battle the 22nd was commanded by Lieutenant Colonel John Weedon, assisted by Captain Harry T. Toulmin, under Deas' Brigade (Brigadier General Zachariah C. Deas), under Hindman's Division (Major General Thomas C. Hindman), under the Left Wing (Lieutenant General James Longstreet), under the Army of Tennessee (General Braxton Bragg). On 19 September, Deas' Brigade was placed in a line of battle (Saturday morning) near Lee and Gordon's Mill, on southern end of Confederate line, and formed a line of log breastworks. The 22nd Alabama was in the line of battle which moved to assault Union Major General William Rosecrans at Chickamauga, where it lost 5 color bearers and 175 killed and wounded out of about 400 engaged.

The 22nd Alabama lost lightly in November 1863 at the Battle of Missionary Ridge and wintered at Dalton, Georgia, where weather and sickness claimed 272 men.

=== 1864 ===
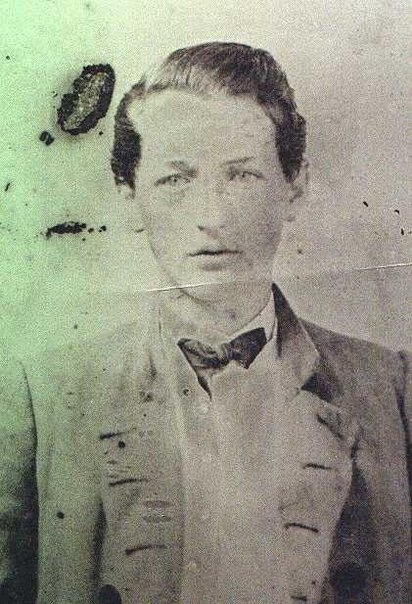
Capt. William Owen Baldwin, Jr., the "boy captain" of Deas' brigade, killed in the battle of Franklin, 30 November 1864, aged 19

The 22nd Alabama under the command of General George D. Johnston of Perry County, participated in the campaign from Dalton to Atlanta, losing gradually by the constant fighting. At Atlanta, from 22 to 28 July, the loss in the regiment was high, as it was at Jonesboro. It moved into Tennessee with General John Bell Hood and suffered severely at Franklin and lightly at Nashville.

=== 1865 ===
The 22nd Alabama was transferred beyond the Edisto and moved into North Carolina, skirmishing with the advance of Union Major General George Thomas' army. The loss at Kinston and Bentonville was light, with Colonel Harry Toulmin leading the brigade. The regiment was consolidated with the 25th Infantry in the field in early 1865 and then it was also consolidated with the 25th, 39th, and 26/50th at Smithfield, 9 April 1865, with H. T. Toulmin as colonel, N. B. Rouse (Butler) as lieutenant colonel, and Robert Donald (Limestone) as major, and then surrendered at Greensboro, North Carolina, on 26 April 1865.

== Commanding officers ==
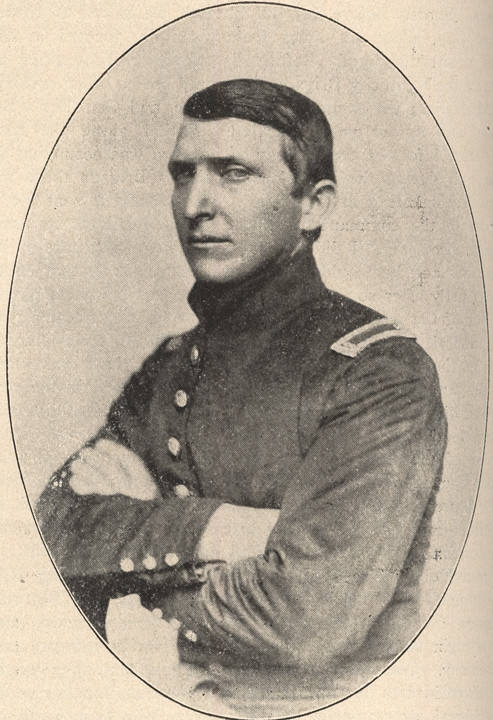
Col. John C. Marrast

- Colonel Zachariah Cantey Deas
- Colonel John Calhoun Marrast
- Colonel Benjamin R. Hart
- Colonel Harry Theophilus Toulmin

=== Field and Staff Officers ===
Field and staff officers included:

- Colonels: Zachariah Cantey Deas (wounded, Shiloh, promoted to BGen), John Calhoun Marrast (died in service, 1863), Benjamin R. Hart (KIA, Atlanta, Jan., 1864), and Harry Theophilus Toulmin
- Lieutenant Colonels: John Calhoun Marrast (promoted), John Weedon (KIA, Chickamauga), Benjamin R. Hart (promoted), Harry Theophilus Toulmin (promoted), and E. Herbert Armistead (KIA, Franklin)
- Majors: Robert Burbage Armistead (KIA, Shiloh), John Weeden (promoted), Benjamin R. Hart (wounded, Chickamauga, promoted), Thomas McCarroll Prince (wounded, Franklin);
- Adjutants: Elias F. Travis (wounded, Shiloh, and transferred), William G. Smith (resigned), J. L. Lockwood (wounded, Jonesboro).

=== Company commanders ===
- Co. "A" (Walker): John Weedon (promoted to major); Isaac M. Whitney
- Co. "B", Frank Lyon Rifles (Clarke): James Deas Nott (KIA, Chickamauga); Joseph R. Cowan (wounded, near Marietta)
- Co. "C", Brownrigg Warriors (Choctaw): Abner C. Gaines (KIA, Shiloh); Thomas McCarroll Prince (wounded, Chickamauga; promoted to major); Joseph R. Cowan (wounded near Mobile)
- Co. "D" (Cherokee): Stephen R. Hood (resigned, 10 January 62); Edward Herbert Armistead (promoted); T. C. Hagood; Thomas M. Brindley (KIA, near Atlanta, July 64)
- Co. "E" (Calhoun): John R. Northcutt (resigned, 13 June 62); Jacob G. Mordecai
- Co. "F" (Randolph): O. W. Shepherd (wounded, near Shiloh; resigned, 27 May 62); James B. Martin; Hures Austill
- Co. "G" (Randolph): R. G. Roberts (dismissed, 25 June 63); S. H. Pairs (deserted, 27 October 62); Benjamin B. Little (KIA, Jonesboro); William O. Baldwin (KIA, Franklin)
- Co. "H", Sam Cooper Rifles (Mobile): Wilton L. Young (promoted to major, 10th Bn.); Harry T. Toulmin (wounded, Shiloh; promoted to major); Simon Franklin Preston
- Co. "I" (Pike): Andrew P. Love (wounded, Shiloh; resigned, 1 July 62; transferred to Jeff Davis' Cavalry); Willis C. Wood (wounded, Murfreesboro; resigned, 31 October 64); Willis H. Henderson (wounded, Kinston)
- Co. "K" (Montgomery and Pike): Benjamin R. Hart (promoted to major); Hugh W. Henry.

== See also ==
- List of Confederate units from Alabama
