= Adley H. Gladden =

American general (1810–1862)

Adley Hogan Gladden
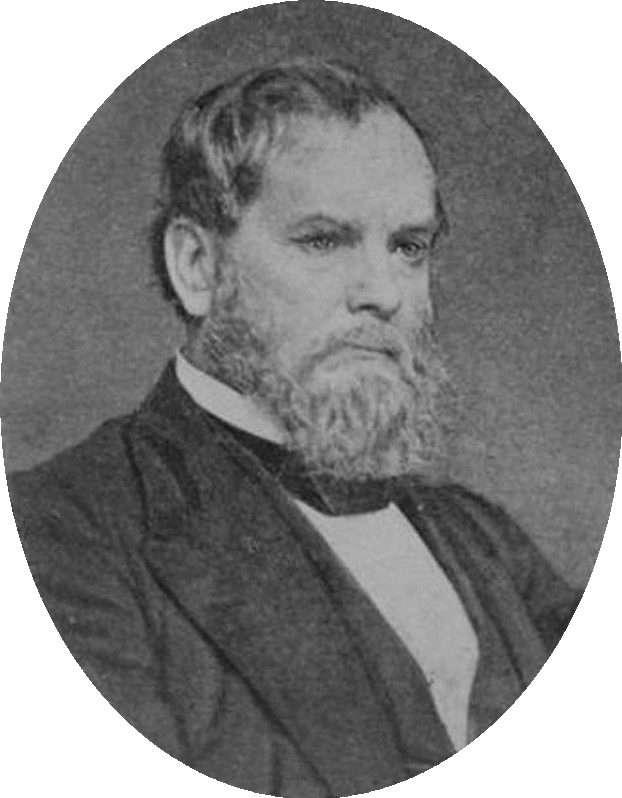
- Adley Hogan Gladden
- Born: September 28, 1810; Fairfield District, South Carolina
- Died: April 12, 1862 (aged 51); Shiloh, Tennessee
- Burial place: Magnolia Cemetery, Mobile, Alabama
- Military career
- Allegiance: United States of America; Confederate States of America
- Branch: United States Army; Confederate States Army
- Service years: 1846–1848 (USA); 1861–1862 (CSA)
- Rank: Lieutenant Colonel (USA); Brigadier General (CSA)
- Nickname: "Bengal Tiger"
- Units: 1st Louisiana Regulars; 1st Brigade
- Conflicts: Second Seminole War; Mexican–American War: Battle of Churubusco; Belen Gate; American Civil War: Battle of Pensacola; Battle of Shiloh †

Adley Hogan Gladden (September 28, 1810 – April 12, 1862) was lieutenant colonel and second commander of the Palmetto Regiment of South Carolina volunteers during the Mexican–American War and a brigadier general in the Confederate States Army during the American Civil War. He impressed General Braxton Bragg after defending Pensacola from Union Army bombardment and after a brief assignment at Mobile, Alabama, he was brought to Corinth, Mississippi, to command a brigade in the Army of Mississippi. He was mortally wounded at the Battle of Shiloh.

== Early life ==
Adley Hogan Gladden was born on October 28, 1810, in the Fairfield District of South Carolina. In 1830, he became a cotton broker in Columbia, South Carolina. Gladden owned several slaves, whom he later sold to his brother-in-law. He served in the Florida War or Second Seminole War. He was appointed postmaster of Columbia, South Carolina, by President John Tyler.

== Mexican–American War ==
In the Mexican–American War, Gladden was a major and then, as lieutenant colonel, commander of the Palmetto Regiment of South Carolina volunteers. After the death of its colonel and lieutenant-colonel while storming the Mexican works at the Battle of Churubusco, Gladden became lieutenant colonel and commander of the regiment. He led the Palmetto Regiment in the assault upon the Belen Gate at the Battle of Mexico City, where he also was severely wounded.

Gladden moved to New Orleans, Louisiana, after the war.

== American Civil War ==
On January 25, 1861, Gladden accepted appointment as lieutenant colonel of the 1st South Carolina Infantry Regiment, but soon resigned to become a member of the Louisiana secession convention. After the convention ended, he became colonel of the 1st Louisiana Infantry Regiment (Regulars) and took the regiment to Pensacola, Florida. On September 30, 1861, he was commissioned brigadier general and assigned to command of a brigade, including the 1st Louisiana Infantry Regiment, of which future brigadier general Daniel Weisiger Adams then became colonel. He was in command of his brigade during the bombardment of the Confederate forts at Pensacola harbor, and General Braxton Bragg expressed thanks for the able support Gladden provided. From December 22, 1861, to January 27, 1862, he was commander of the Army of Pensacola.

Subsequently, General Bragg, expressing a desire to form a brigade of regiments which should set an example of discipline and official excellence, said, "I should desire General Gladden to command them." On January 27, 1862, Gladden was transferred to Mobile, Alabama, until March 9, 1862, and then to Corinth, Mississippi, where he was placed in command of a brigade composed of four Alabama regiments, the 1st Louisiana and Robertson's battery in the Army of Mississippi.

On the first day of the Battle of Shiloh, April 6, 1862, Gladden was mortally wounded by a shell fragment, which required amputation of an arm on the field.

General P. G. T. Beauregard, commander of the Army of Mississippi after the death of General Albert Sidney Johnston at Shiloh on April 6, 1862, described Gladden's death as follows: "In the same quarter of the field all of Withers' division, including Gladden's brigade, reinforced by John C. Breckinridge's whole reserve, soon became engaged, and Benjamin Prentiss' entire line, though fighting stoutly, was pressed back in confusion. We early lost the services of the gallant Gladden, a man of soldierly aptitudes and experience, who, after a marked influence upon the issue in his quarter of the field, fell mortally wounded."

Adley Hogan Gladden died on April 12, 1862. He is buried in Magnolia Cemetery (Mobile, Alabama).

== See also ==
List of American Civil War generals (Confederate)
