= 61st Illinois Infantry Regiment =

Infantry regiment of United States Volunteers

61st Regiment Illinois Volunteer Infantry
- Illinois state flag
- Active: 1862–1865
- Disbanded: September 27, 1865
- Country: United States
- Allegiance: Illinois
- Branch: Volunteers
- Type: Infantry
- Size: Regiment
- Engagements: Battle of Shiloh; Siege of Corinth; Siege of Vicksburg; Action at Overall's Creek; Third Battle of Murfreesboro

The 61st Regiment Illinois Volunteer Infantry was an infantry regiment that served in the Union Army during the American Civil War.

== Service ==
The 61st Illinois Infantry was originally organized at Carrollton, Illinois and mustered into Federal service on February 5, 1862. The regiment was mustered out at Nashville, Tennessee, on September 27, 1865.

== Total strength and casualties ==
The regiment suffered 3 officers and 34 enlisted men who were killed in action or mortally wounded and 4 officers and 183 enlisted men who died of disease, for a total of 224 fatalities.

== Commanders ==
- Colonel Jacob Fry, March 26, 1862- May 14, 1863 (resigned)
- Colonel Simon P. Ohr, May 14, 1863- September 14, 1864 (died).
- Colonel Daniel Grass, September 15, 1864- May 15, 1865 (discharged).
- Colonel Jerome B. Nulton, July 18, 1865- September 8, 1865 (mustered out).

== See also ==
- List of Illinois Civil War Units
