= Battle of Pensacola (1861) =

Battle of the American Civil War

Siege of Pensacola Bay
- Part of the American Civil War
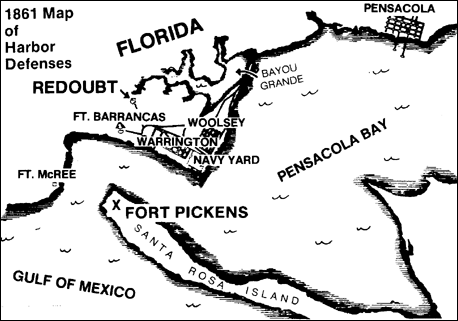
- Map of the defenses of Pensacola Bay.
Date	January 8–November 23, 1861
Location	Escambia County, Florida
Result	Union victory

Belligerents
United States (Union)	(Confederate States of America) CSA (Confederacy)

Commanders and leaders
Harvey Brown	Braxton Bragg

Strength
2,000	10,000

Casualties and losses
14 dead, 29 wounded and 24 prisoners	18 dead, 39 wounded and 30 missing

The Battle of Pensacola was a 15-month armed struggle for Pensacola, Florida that began before the outbreak of the American Civil War. Confederate forces took control of the port city on the Gulf of Mexico while U.S. forces retained a foothold on nearby Santa Rosa Island. In May 1862 Confederate troops evacuated and the U.S. occupied the city.

== Background ==
After Abraham Lincoln was elected President, but before he took office, southern states began seceding from the United States, led by South Carolina on December 20, 1860. Around midnight of January 8, 1861, the small garrison of Fort Barrancas repelled a group of local men intent on taking the fort. Some historians suggest that these were the first shots fired by United States forces in the Civil War. On January 10, 1861, the day Florida seceded from the Union, the garrison evacuated Fort Barrancas to the dilapidated but more defensible Fort Pickens.

== Siege of Pensacola ==
Over the next several months, both sides built new cannon batteries and brought in more personnel. The opposing forces engaged in cannon duels many times but with little effect. Near the end of the year, manning stood at about 10,000 men on the Confederate side opposed by 2,000 Union soldiers around Fort Pickens.

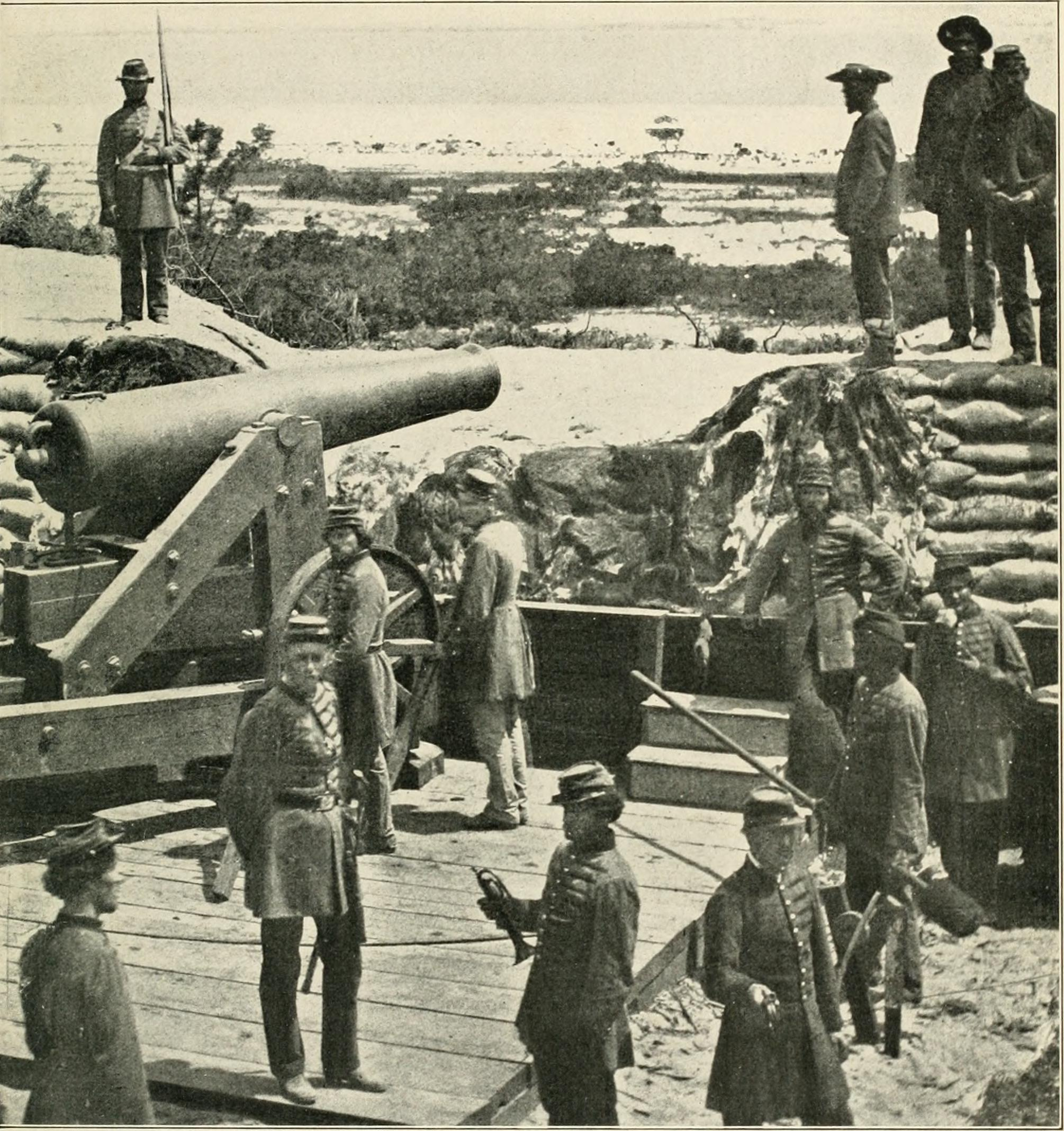
Confederates drilling at one of the recently captured Pensacola forts that had been abandoned by the Union forces

=== Battle of Santa Rosa Island ===
On 9 October 1861 the commander of Confederate forces in Pensacola, General Braxton Bragg, ordered an assault on Fort Pickens that was ultimately unsuccessful. Colonel Harvey Brown, the commander of Union forces, felt this attack required an answer and planned an attack of his own. Fort McRee, the closest fortification to Fort Pickens and a road block to any attempted assault on Pensacola, was to be the primary target.

=== Bombardment of Pensacola Bay ===
Starting on the morning of 22 November 1861, Fort McRee and the Pensacola Navy Yard were bombarded heavily by Union forces at Fort Pickens, and by two ships, Niagara and Richmond. Initially returning strong fire, the Confederates were able to hold their own and even managed to heavily damage the Richmond. However, the combined efforts of the two ships eventually led to the suppression of fire by an adjacent battery early in the afternoon with the guns of Fort McRee falling silent by 5pm. A fall in tide and the onset of darkness caused the two ships to withdraw.

After the days fight, General Bragg sent messengers out to ascertain the extent of damage to the Confederate defenses. The commander of Fort McRee, Colonel John Bordenave Villepigue, advised that his position was heavily exposed on most sides and that half his weapons had been dismounted and their powder stores unprotected. Villepigue stated he was unable to return fire and asked to sabotage the fort and withdraw. Worried about the effect the retreat would have not only on his men but the enemy as well, Bragg denied the request.

At 10am on 23 November, the Niagara resumed its attack on Fort McRee as did the cannons at Fort Pickens. The guns of Fort McRee remained silent. The end of fighting that day signaled the end of the Colonel Brown's attack. Although Fort McRee survived, it was badly battered. Large chunks of the wall were blown away while other portions had holes shot clean through by the cannon shells. In one area a section of wall totally collapsed. Most of the wood decking within the fort had gone up in flames while one powder magazine caved in, killing six Confederates in the process.

The actions on 22 and 23 November would be the last engagement for Fort McRee. Although there was an artillery duel on 1 January 1862, the fort was not a participant in that action.

=== Evacuation ===
Learning that the Union Army had taken New Orleans, Confederate forces abandoned Pensacola in May 1862. They burned Fort McRee and several other buildings in the area believed to be of strategic value. No mention in surviving records indicate that any repairs were made or even attempted on the fort by Union forces.
