= Florida panhandle =

Northwest region of Florida

Coordinates: 30.43°N 85.19°W

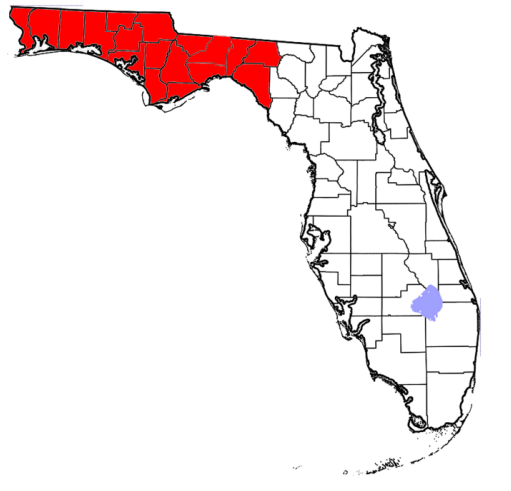
Florida counties, shown in red, that may be included in the panhandle; the eastern extent of the panhandle is arbitrarily defined and may vary

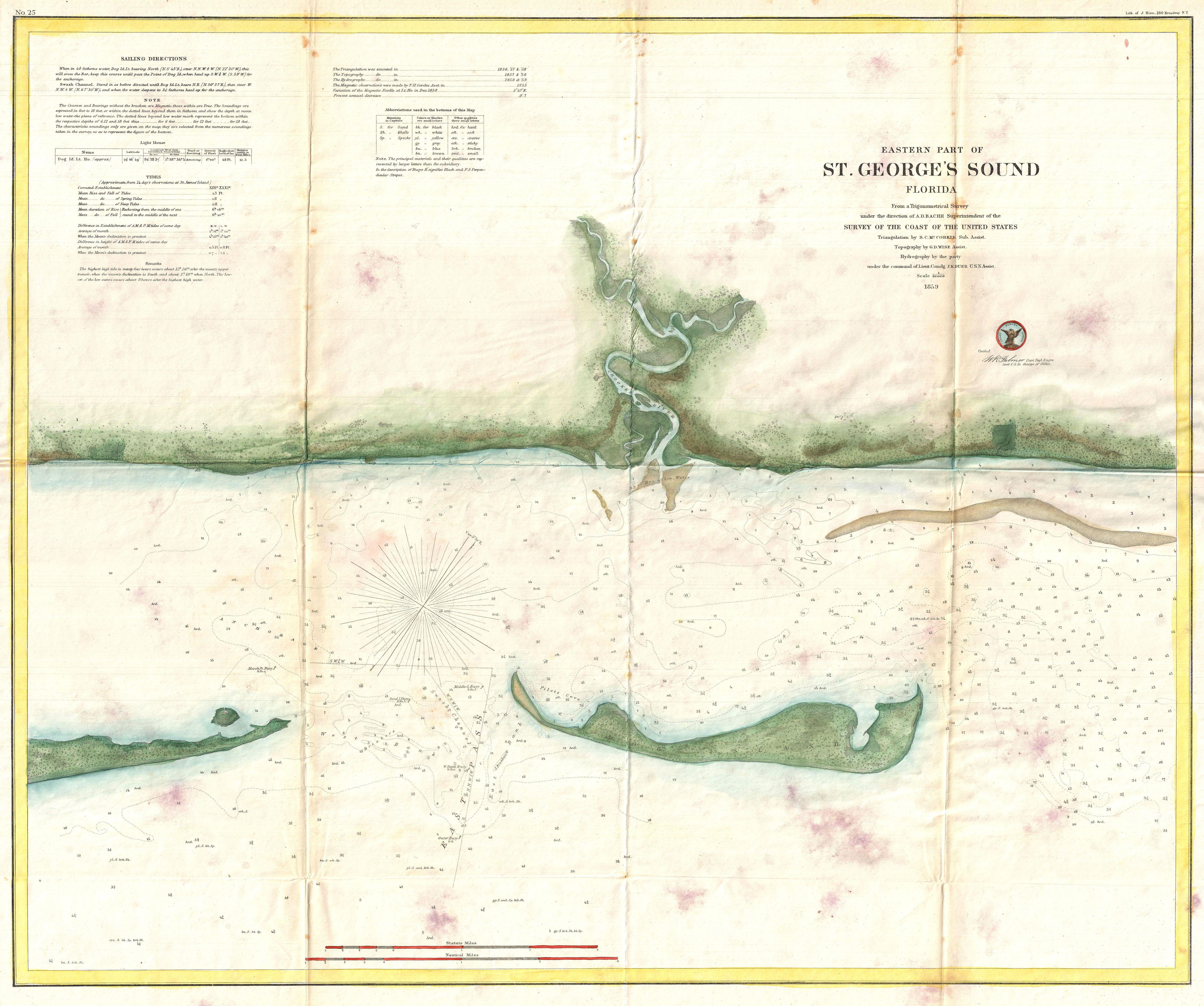
U.S. Coast Survey map or nautical chart of St. George Sound, Florida, the coast part of Tate's Hell State Forest, just southwest of Tallahassee, along the Florida panhandle (1859)

The Florida panhandle (also known as West Florida and Northwest Florida) is the northwestern part of the U.S. state of Florida. It is a salient roughly 200 miles (320 km) long, bordered by Alabama on the west and north, Georgia on the north, and the Gulf of Mexico to the south. Its eastern boundary is arbitrarily defined. It is defined by its southern culture and rural demographics in contrast to urbanized central and southern Florida, as well as closer cultural links to Alabama and Georgia. Its major communities include Pensacola, Navarre, Destin, Panama City Beach, and Tallahassee.

As is the case with the other eight U.S. states that have panhandles, the geographic meaning of the term is inexact and elastic. References to the Florida panhandle always include the ten counties west of the Apalachicola River, a natural geographic boundary, which was the historic dividing line between the British colonies of West Florida and East Florida. These western counties also lie in the Central Time Zone (with the exception of Gulf County, which is divided between the Eastern and Central Time zones), while the rest of the state is in the Eastern Time Zone. References to the panhandle may also include some or all of eleven counties immediately east of the Apalachicola known as the Big Bend region, along the curve of Apalachee Bay.

Like the rest of North Florida, including North Central Florida, the panhandle is more similar in culture and climate to the Deep South than the rest of the state, particularly than Central Florida and South Florida in the lower peninsula. The Florida panhandle is known for its conservative politics, religious adherence, and "piney woods".

The largest city in the panhandle is Tallahassee, the state capital, population 196,169 (2020). However, the largest city west of the Appalachicola river is Pensacola, which has a population of 54,312 (2020) and also has the largest Metropolitan area in the entire panhandle with a population of 511,502 (2020). This metro area includes the second- and third-largest communities in the region, Pensacola and Navarre. The total population of the panhandle, as of the 2020 census, was 1,539,677, just under 6.6% of Florida's total population as recorded in the same census. At roughly 118 persons per square mile, its population density is less than 30% of Florida's as a whole.

== Coastal regions ==
=== Emerald Coast ===
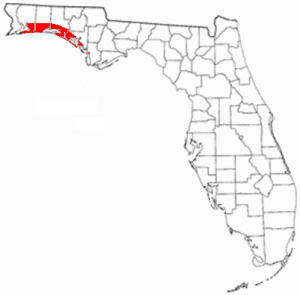
Location of Florida's Emerald Coast

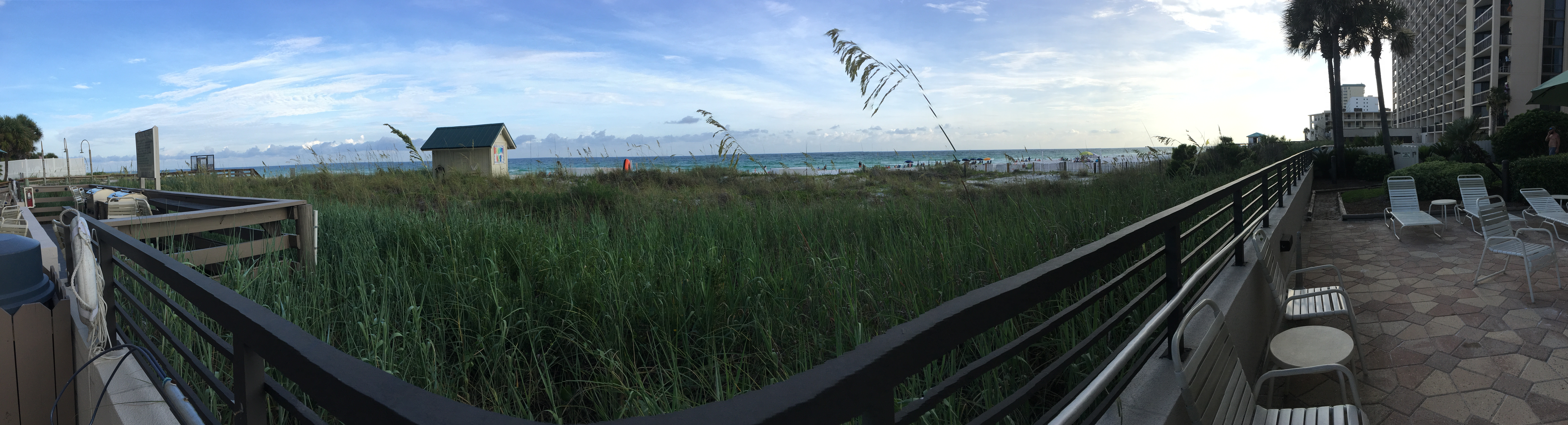
Beach in Destin

Emerald Coast, a term coined in 1983, refers in general to the beaches and coastal resorts from Pensacola to Port St. Joe, but is sometimes used to refer, by extension, to the panhandle as a whole, especially west of the Apalachicola. Earlier designations include "Playground of the Gulfcoast" and the "Miracle Strip", especially for the area between Fort Walton Beach and Panama City. Coastal regions of the following counties (if not the entirety of the counties themselves) are usually included when referring to the Emerald Coast:

- Escambia County
- Santa Rosa County
- Okaloosa County
- Walton County

Coastal portions of Bay County are also regularly included when referring to the Emerald Coast, but with somewhat less regularity than the four aforementioned counties listed above.

=== Forgotten Coast ===
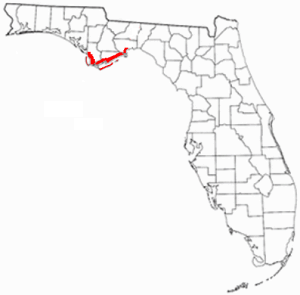
Florida's Forgotten Coast

The Forgotten Coast is a trademarked term coined in the early 1990s used to refer to the coastal portion of the Florida panhandle extending from Mexico Beach or southeastern Bay County on the Gulf of Mexico to St. Marks on Apalachee Bay. It is usually not considered a part of the Emerald Coast, which lies directly adjacent to the west. Coastal regions of the following counties (if not the entirety of the counties themselves) are usually included when referring to the Forgotten Coast:

- Gulf County
- Franklin County
- Wakulla County
- Small portions of Bay County

== Physical features ==
The Apalachicola River is the largest river of the panhandle. It is formed by the junction of several rivers, including the Chattahoochee and the Flint, where the boundaries of Alabama, Georgia, and Florida meet. From there, it flows southward to the town of Apalachicola.

Major estuaries include, from west to east: Perdido Bay, fed by the Perdido River, which forms the west boundary of Florida; Escambia Bay and East Bay, fed by the Escambia River and Blackwater River, respectively; Choctawhatchee Bay, fed by the Choctawhatchee River; and St. Andrews Bay, fed by Econfina Creek. Pensacola Bay, a deepwater port, is formed by the joining of Escambia and East bays. The Gulf Intracoastal Waterway, completed in 1949, traverses the lower panhandle by means of bays, lagoons, sounds, and human-made canals. The barrier islands of Perdido Key and Santa Rosa Island extend from the Panhandle's western extremity through Fort Walton Beach to Destin.

Britton Hill is the highest natural point in the state at 345 feet (105 meters) above mean sea level.

The Florida Panhandle's coastline features over 15 coastal dune lakes, which are unique globally because they periodically connect to the Gulf of Mexico and receive water from surrounding wetlands and rainfall.

== History ==
=== 19th century ===
Throughout the 19th century, the panhandle was sparsely populated, dotted in places with small farming communities, none of which had as many as a thousand residents. Many panhandle residents had, in fact, migrated to the area from Alabama and had relatives there; it was also easier to trade with and travel to southern Alabama than to reach East Florida by slow, arduous journey across the thick cypress swamps and dense pine forests of the panhandle. It was natural for West Floridians to feel that they had more in common with their nearby neighbors in Alabama than with the residents of the peninsula, hundreds of miles away.

In 1821, Pensacola was the only city (in 19th-century terms) in West Florida, with a population estimated to be about 3,000. In the 1850 census, the enumerated population of Pensacola was 2,164 (including 741 slaves and 350 "free Negroes").

==== Alabama annexation proposals ====
During the course of the century, proposals for ceding the Florida counties west of the Apalachicola River to Alabama were often raised:

- In 1811, while Florida was still a Spanish possession, American settlers in the territory sent a petition to Congress asking to be incorporated into the Mississippi Territory, which at that time included present-day Alabama. (See West Florida article.)
- In 1819, the constitutional convention of Alabama asked Congress to include West Florida in their new state.
- In 1822, only a year after the U.S. acquired the entire Florida territory from Spain, residents of West Florida sent a petition to the U.S. House of Representatives asking that their section be annexed to Alabama, and Alabama Senator John Williams Walker also promoted the idea.
- In 1826, the Pensacola Gazette published a number of letters advocating annexation to Alabama, though the editor remarked that some Pensacolians opposed the idea.
- In 1840, a public meeting in Pensacola produced a demand that West Florida be united with Alabama. In the same year, the territorial Legislature notified Congress that it opposed allowing Alabama to annex West Florida, but in 1844, the year before statehood, the Legislature reversed its stance and asked that West Florida be separated.
- In 1856, advocates of annexation were able to get a bill passed by the Legislature authorizing a referendum on the issue, but Governor James E. Broome vetoed the measure. The Pensacola Gazette reported that "annexation is desired by a large majority of the people" of the area.
- In 1858, the Alabama Legislature unsuccessfully tried to open negotiations with Florida on the subject.
- The annexation issue was eclipsed by the Civil War and the war's effects on the region, but in 1868, with Pensacola now connected by the panhandle's sole railroad line to the Alabama cities of Mobile and Montgomery, the issue came to a head again and was finally put to a vote of the people. In that year, the Alabama Legislature approved a joint resolution authorizing their Governor to negotiate with the Governor of Florida about the annexation of West Florida. An offer of one million dollars in Alabama state bonds, paying 8 percent interest for thirty years, was included. Both states appointed commissioners to make detailed recommendations on the matter.

Results by county of the 1869 annexation referendum Yes: 90–100%; 70–80%; 60–70%; 50–60%; No: 60–70%; 50–60%; No vote

- On November 2, 1869, a referendum was held in the West Florida counties (except Jackson, which was in the throes of bloody racial violence), with a result of 1162 to 661 in favor of annexation. However, political objection developed in Alabama to the high price, and the Legislature took no action on the results of the referendum.
- In 1873, a similar proposal was made in the Alabama Legislature, which the state senate approved, though it did not pass a separate proposal to finance the measure by selling all of Alabama's territory west of the Tombigbee River, including the city of Mobile, to Mississippi. However, nothing came of this action.
- In 1901, Alabama made yet another offer when the Legislature appointed a commission to negotiate with Florida about annexation, but this attempt, too, was unsuccessful.

The region's post-Civil War timber and turpentine industries were spurred by the development of new railroad lines. One addition was Henry Bradley Plant's 1883 railroad branch that extended to Chattahoochee.

The building of the Pensacola and Atlantic Railroad, completed in 1883, finally linked Pensacola and the panhandle solidly with the rest of the state and ended the region's isolation, although from time to time during the twentieth century there were still occasional calls for annexation that generated some public discussion but no legislative action.

=== 20th century ===
In the last quarter of the century, hurricanes that directly struck the area and caused significant damage included Hurricane Eloise in 1975, Hurricane Kate in 1985, and Hurricane Erin and Hurricane Opal, both in 1995.

The area was a prime target of the March 1993 Storm of the Century.

=== 21st century ===
The panhandle suffered direct hits from Hurricane Ivan in 2004 and Hurricane Dennis in 2005. Ivan was the most disastrous, making landfall near Gulf Shores, Alabama, with 120 mile-per-hour (193 km/h) winds and a 14-foot (4.3 m) storm surge that devastated Perdido Key and Santa Rosa Island, wrecked the Interstate 10 bridge across Escambia Bay, and destroyed thousands of homes in the region, some as far away as 20 miles (32 km) inland.

On June 23, 2010, oil from the Deepwater Horizon oil spill landed on Pensacola Beach and Navarre Beach, damaging the fishing and tourism industries, and prompting a massive clean-up effort.

On October 10, 2018, the panhandle suffered a direct hit from Hurricane Michael, with winds as high as 160 mph. Michael was one of only four category 5 hurricanes to ever hit the US mainland. Thousands of homes were destroyed, and apartment rents in Panama City increased, with a $500 apartment renting for $1000 in 2019. Recovery from Hurricane Michael was not complete in June 2019, and disaster relief for the panhandle remained stalled in Congress.

Hurricane Michael in 2018 caused long-lasting demographic impacts in Bay County. Studies show that almost 5.2 percent of the county's population permanently relocated for better living and stressing local recovery efforts (Federal Reserve Bank of Atlanta, 2025). This migration underscores the lack of coastal communities to climate-related problems.

Hurricane Sally, a slow-moving Category 2 hurricane, made landfall at Gulf Shores, Alabama, on September 16, 2020, bringing hurricane-force winds, storm surge, and record river flooding to parts of the western Florida panhandle. Rainfall totals reached nearly 25 inches just west of Naval Air Station Pensacola, and a section of the U.S. Highway 98 Three Mile Bridge over Pensacola Bay collapsed after a construction barge struck it. Sally caused an estimated $7.3 billion in damage in the United States, mostly in Alabama and the Florida panhandle.

In 2023, Hurricane Idalia directly struck the region as well, near the City of Perry, Florida. This was immediately followed by Hurricane Helene the following year, also making landfall in Taylor County. In 2026, the region suffered yet another direct strike, this time from Hurricane Isaias (2026), which made landfall near Destin, Florida. All three of these storms also caused considerable damage to the region.

== Economy ==
Historically, the economy of the panhandle depended mainly on farming, forestry and lumbering, paper mills, import/export shipping at Pensacola and to a lesser extent at Panama City, shipbuilding, and commercial fishing. After World War II, the economy was boosted by the numerous military bases established in the region, as well as the growth of tourism and the hospitality industry.

In addition to military bases, state and local governments, hospitals, schools, and colleges, major private employers in the second half of the twentieth century included Monsanto and Westinghouse plants at Pensacola, the St. Joe Paper Company in Port St. Joe, and Gulf Power, a major electric utility company.

Beyond the contributions of tourism and the military, the Trade, Transportation, and Utilities sector serves as the region's second-largest employer. This sector is supported by regional logistics hubs, such as the Port of St. Joe.

The Apalachicola Bay oyster fishery's ecological collapse in 2012 is a major contemporary issue. This fishery historically provided 90% of Florida's oysters, and its decline is linked to reduced freshwater inflow from upstream river basins.

In recent years, regional economic development initiatives have focused on diversifying beyond tourism and military bases. The Port of St. Joe has been revitalized as a logistics hub, supporting trade, transportation, and utilities across Northwest Florida (Florida TaxWatch, 2014). These efforts highlight the importance of infrastructure investment in strengthening the Panhandle's economic resilience.

Unlike central and southern Florida, the panhandle has never been a producer of citrus crops because the area is subject to regular frosts and freezes during winter, which destroy citrus fruits.

The Category 5 Hurricane Michael in 2018 caused long-lasting demographic impacts in the area. For instance, 5.2% of Bay County's population permanently relocated, which resulted in increased social imbalance in the county.

The collapse of the Apalachicola Bay Oyster fishery in 2012 remains one of the most relevant ecological problems in the region. Researchers have linked the decline to reduced freshwater inflow from upstream river basins, which altered salinity levels and damaged the oyster ecosystems (Wellock, 2024). Restoring these ecosystems requires immense monitoring to ensure safe fishery practices.

== Transportation ==
=== Road ===
I-10 is the only interstate highway in the panhandle, connecting the extreme west with North Florida and Jacksonville. Other older east–west routes include US 90 and US 98. Important north–south routes west of the Apalachicola River include US 29, US 331, and US 231, all linking to Alabama and I-65. SR 20 stretches from Niceville to Tallahassee.

=== Rail ===
Freight service is provided by the Class III Florida Gulf & Atlantic Railroad, which acquired most of the CSX main line from Pensacola to Jacksonville on June 1, 2019. (For the history of this line, see Pensacola and Atlantic Railroad.)

Passenger service ended with the creation of Amtrak in 1971, but was revived with the extension of the Sunset Limited to Orlando beginning in 1993; however, passenger service was discontinued after Hurricane Katrina struck the Gulf Coast in 2005. Other regional short-line railroads serving the panhandle are the Alabama and Gulf Coast Railway (formerly BNSF Railway, ex-Frisco Railway), the Bay Line Railroad, and the AN Railway.

=== Air ===
Major airports include:

- Pensacola International Airport
- Destin-Fort Walton Beach Airport
- Northwest Florida Beaches International Airport
- Tallahassee International Airport
- Bob Sikes Airport
- Destin Executive Airport
- DeFuniak Springs Airport
- Apalachicola Regional Airport
- Perry-Foley Airport

== Education ==
The following institutions of higher learning are located in the Florida panhandle.

State University System:

- Florida Agricultural and Mechanical University (Tallahassee)
- Florida State University (Tallahassee)
- University of West Florida (Pensacola)

Florida College System:

- Chipola College (Marianna)
- Gulf Coast State College (Panama City)
- Northwest Florida State College (Niceville)
- Pensacola State College (Pensacola)
- Tallahassee Community College (Tallahassee)

Religiously affiliated:

- Baptist College of Florida (Graceville)
- Pensacola Christian College (Pensacola)

== Politics ==
The politics of the Florida panhandle vary considerably depending on location. The western panhandle, particularly the Emerald Coast, was one of the earliest areas to shake off its Yellow dog Democrat roots, and since the 1990s has become the most Republican part of Florida. Fort Walton Beach, Destin and Panama City regularly give Republicans close to or over 70% margins in state and national elections. However, Tallahassee and Gadsden County tend to be strongly Democratic. In the 2008 presidential election, John McCain received 421,287 votes (60.1%) in the panhandle, while Barack Obama received 279,206 votes (39.9%).

Under the 2023–2033 decennial reapportionment, the Florida panhandle is split between Florida's 1st congressional district, represented by Jimmy Patronis (R–Fort Walton Beach), and Florida's 2nd congressional district, represented by Neal Dunn (R–Panama City).

== Culture and sports ==
- Great Gulfcoast Arts Festival
- Florida A&M Rattlers
- Florida State Seminoles
- Pensacola Blue Wahoos
- Pensacola Ice Flyers
- Red Hills Horse Trials
- Springtime Tallahassee
- Tallahassee Wine and Food Festival

The Florida Panhandle's "Deep South" culture includes a distinct African American folklife. An example is the "Sunday Morning Band" burial societies, which have been central to ritual identity in West Florida.

The Panhandle's African American folklife includes unique burial traditions such as the "Sunday Morning Band" Societies, which have been central to ritual identity in West Florida (Bucuvalas, 2011). These practices reflect the region's deep cultural relationships to the traditions of the Deep South.

== Counties ==
The following counties west of the Apalachicola River are always included in references to the panhandle:

- Bay
- Calhoun
- Escambia
- Gulf
- Holmes
- Jackson
- Okaloosa
- Santa Rosa
- Walton
- Washington

Some or all of the following counties east of the Apalachicola, in the Big Bend subregion, are sometimes considered part of the panhandle:

- Dixie
- Franklin
- Gadsden
- Hamilton
- Jefferson
- Lafayette
- Leon
- Liberty
- Madison
- Taylor
- Wakulla

== Cities and towns ==
Places marked with an asterisk (*) lie east of the Apalachicola River, and may not be considered part of the panhandle by some residents or writers.

- Apalachicola
- Blountstown
- Bonifay
- Brent
- Callaway
- Carrabelle*
- Cedar Grove
- Century
- Chipley
- Crestview
- Cross City*
- DeFuniak Springs
- Destin
- Fort Walton Beach
- Gulf Breeze
- Jay
- Lynn Haven
- Madison*
- Marianna
- Mexico Beach
- Milton
- Niceville
- Panama City
- Panama City Beach
- Paxton
- Pensacola
- Port St Joe
- Quincy*
- Springfield
- Tallahassee*
- Valparaiso

Population of the major metropolitan areas in the panhandle:

- Pensacola-Ferry Pass-Brent Metropolitan Statistical Area – 455,102 (2009)
- Fort Walton Beach-Crestview-Destin, Florida Metropolitan Statistical Area – 180,822 (2010)
- Panama City-Lynn Haven-Panama City Beach Metropolitan Statistical Area – 202,236 (2020)
- Tallahassee Standard Metropolitan Statistical Area – 367,413 (2010)

== Beaches ==
The panhandle is renowned for the white sand beaches and blue-green waters of its barrier islands fronting the Gulf of Mexico. According to the National Park Service:

The stunning sugar-white beaches of Gulf Islands National Seashore are composed of fine quartz eroded from granite in the Appalachian Mountains. The sand is carried seaward by rivers and creeks and deposited by currents along the shore.

The beach towns in the panhandle, many of which play host to college students during spring break, are sometimes derisively called the Redneck Riviera. The term was used as the title of a song by country music artist Tom T. Hall on his 1996 album Songs from Sopchoppy. The album takes its name from a town in rural Wakulla County, near Tallahassee.

Tourists have been drawn to the panhandle since the building of the Pensacola and Atlantic Railroad in the 1880s. Pensacola Beach has been a major tourist attraction since the building of bridges between the mainland and Santa Rosa Island in 1931. After World War II, an increase in both tourism and population of the area led to a proliferation of motels, restaurants, bars, tourist attractions, and amusement parks along the coast, concentrated in Pensacola Beach, Fort Walton Beach, and Panama City Beach. Examples include the Gulfarium marine park and aquarium in Fort Walton Beach, and the former Miracle Strip Amusement Park (1963–2004) in Panama City Beach.

In 1971, the federal government acquired many acres of the coastal islands in Escambia, Santa Rosa, and Okaloosa counties, preserving them from commercial development by establishing the Gulf Islands National Seashore, which also covers some islands off the Mississippi coast. Other beach areas protected by the state of Florida include

- Perdido Key State Park
- Big Lagoon State Park
- Henderson Beach State Park
- Grayton Beach State Park
- St. Andrews State Park
- St. Joseph Peninsula State Park
- St. George Island State Park

Both state and federal parks offer facilities for camping, picnicking, and other recreational pursuits. In addition, some parts of the coastline are federal property belonging to Pensacola Naval Air Station, Eglin Air Force Base, and Tyndall Air Force Base, and so are likewise protected from commercial development.

In addition, seven state aquatic preserves, covering thousands of acres of submerged lands in coastal areas, are located in the panhandle. A number of other state parks, preserves, and forests are located inland.

The 1970s also saw the beginnings of a number of upscale beach resorts, condominium towers, vacation homes, and planned communities, such as Seaside and Sandestin, so that most of the privately owned areas of the coastline are now heavily developed.

The Panhandle's coastline features rare coastal dune lakes, globally unique ecosystems that are sometimes connected to the Gulf of Mexico. These lakes take water from rainfall to create dynamic habitats for wildlife (Cory et al., 2023).

== Military bases ==
Major military bases include the Pensacola Naval Air Station (the home of Naval Aviation in the United States), Eglin Air Force Base and Hurlburt Field near Ft. Walton Beach, Naval Support Activity Panama City in Panama City Beach, and Tyndall Air Force Base near Panama City. Smaller military bases in the Florida panhandle include the Center for Information Warfare Training in Pensacola, Naval Air Station Whiting Field near Milton and Duke Field near Crestview.

The 1983-84 television show Emerald Point N.A.S. was set in a naval air station somewhere in the American South, similar to Pensacola NAS. The 1997-2000 action/adventure series Pensacola: Wings of Gold was explicitly set there.

== See also ==
- Battle of Santa Rosa Island
- Bellamy Road
- Emerald Coast
- Florida Caverns State Park
- Florida in the American Civil War
- Floridan aquifer
- Forgotten Coast
- Fort Barrancas
- Fort McRee
- Fort Pickens
- Gulf Wind
- National Naval Aviation Museum
- Sunset Limited
- West Florida

== Bibliography ==
- DeBolt, Dean. "The Florida Panhandle", pp. 404–445 in The Book Lover's Guide to Florida, ed. Kevin M. McCarthy. Sarasota, Florida: Pineapple Press, 1992. ISBN 978-1-56164-012-6 (Contains an extensive bibliography of fiction and nonfiction works about people and places in the Panhandle.)
- Hollis, Tim. Florida's Miracle Strip: From Redneck Riviera to Emerald Coast. University Press of Mississippi, 2004. ISBN 978-1-57806-627-8
- Jahoda, Gloria. The Other Florida. Scribner, 1967.
- King, Heidi Tyline. The Pelican Guide to the Florida Panhandle. Pelican Publishing, 1999. ISBN 1-56554-308-4
- O'Donovan, Michael, and Robin Rowan. Florida's Northwest: First Places, Wild Places, Favorite Places. Terra Nova Publishing, 2005. ISBN 0-9651034-3-9
- Ziewitz, Kathryn, and June Wiaz. Green Empire: The St. Joe Company and the Remaking of Florida's Panhandle. University Press of Florida, 2006. ISBN 0-8130-2951-1
