= Pensacola Pass =

Inlet on the Florida panhandle coast

Coordinates: 30.328°N 87.308°W

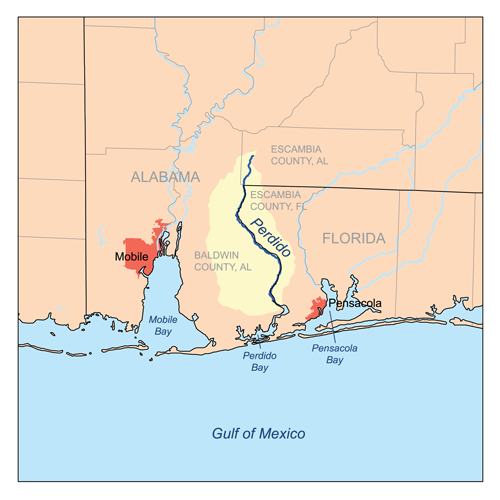
Location of Pensacola Pass in Florida Panhandle
Location of Pensacola Pass in Florida

Pensacola Pass is an inlet between Santa Rosa Island and Perdido Key at the western end of the Florida Panhandle. It connects the Gulf of Mexico to Pensacola Bay. The mainland around Pensacola Bay is heavily developed, with high-rise condominiums. Santa Rosa Island and the eastern part of Perdido Key adjacent to Pensacola Pass are units of the Gulf Islands National Seashore, and remain largely undeveloped.

== Description ==
Pensacola Pass is an inlet between the barrier islands of Santa Rosa Island and Perdido Key connecting the Gulf to Pensacola Bay. Ships and boats use this passage to travel between the two.

During the daily flood tide, fresh saltwater enters Pensacola Pass from the Gulf of Mexico; waters are pulled out on the ebb tide, flushing the bay. The pass is located in the Floridian counties of Escambia and Santa Rosa. It is protected from devastating ocean waves by the Fairpoint peninsula as well as a barrier island, Santa Rosa, from which the county gets its name. The pass itself is about 21 kilometers long and 4 kilometers wide.

== History ==
There is little evidence of human presence around Pensacola Pass before the arrival of Europeans in the area. A Fort Walton culture archaeological site has been identified on Perdido Key, and other archaeological sites may be present, but hurricanes have greatly disturbed and even destroyed such sites on the barrier islands. The Pensacola area was first explored by Europeans in the 16th century. Diego Miruelo found a bay on the north coast of the Gulf of Mexico in 1516 that some authors think was Pensacola Bay.

The Narváez expedition in 1528 may have encountered the Pensacola people in the vicinity of Pensacola Bay. Cabeza de Vaca reported that the Indians they encountered in the vicinity of what is now Pensacola Bay were of "large stature and well formed," and lived in permanent houses. The cacique wore a robe of what de Vaca called "civet-marten", "the best [skins], I think, that can be found." After initially appearing to be friendly, the Indians attacked the Spaniards without warning during the night.

Hernando de Soto sent one of his captains, Francisco Maldonando, to find a harbor on the coast west of Apalachee Province that could be used to resupply his expedition. Maldonado selected Pensacola Bay, which he called "Ochuse" after the native name for the land there.

The first Spanish settlement in Pensacola was founded in 1559 by the explorer Tristan de Luna y Arenallo. He named it the “Bahia Santa Maria de Filipina.” With 1400 people arriving in 11 ships from Mexico, this was the first European settlement in what is now the United States. The colony was later nearly obliterated by a hurricane and the survivors abandoned it in 1561. It was concluded that Florida might be too dangerous to colonize. It was left alone for 135 years.

In 1693, Mexican Viceroy Gaspar de Sandoval Silva, Count of Galve, sent a small crew to inspect the gulf coast from north of the Pensacola bay to the mouth of the Mississippi (the Pensacola Pass). In order to see if the land was adequate for a settlement, they brought the renowned scientist and historian Carlos de Singuenza who renamed the bay “Santa Maria de Galve.” He authored a report that claimed the land was more than hospitable, it was a paradise. In 1698, a settlement was created by the Pensacola Pass that was used as a buffer against the French-owned Louisiana. Andres de Arriola was governor and found the conditions in Florida to be much more harsh than Siguenza had described.

The Spanish had become allies against the English in an attempt to try to prevent them from taking over the Southeast. However, in 1719, it was the French who took Pensacola with a fleet of ships and allied native warriors. The Spanish garrison commander wasn't even aware that a war had begun, so he had no choice but to surrender the fort with the conditions that the Spanish could continue living in the city, and the military men could return to a different fort. Another hurricane hit in 1722, so the French left the city, burning it, so it could not be taken back by the Spanish. The local Spanish created a new city, this time on the mainland instead of the barrier island (Santa Rosa) so it could be protected from large waves and severe weather.

- The Spanish (1722-1763)

- British West Florida (1763-1781)

- The Spanish (1781-1819)

The War of 1812 caused a power shift near the Pensacola Pass. The Spanish holdings in America were weakened, so the United States ended up taking over the area and created a navy yard and 3 forts around Pensacola.

=== American era ===
Shortly after acquiring Florida from Spain, three forts were built to defend the inlet. Fort Barrancas was built on the mainland, Fort Pickens on Santa Rosa Island, and Fort McRee of Foster's Bank (now the eastern end of Perdido Key). Fort McRee was damaged in the Civil War and abandoned after the war. It eventually fell into the inlet as the island eroded away.

In the 1890s, shore batteries for the defense of Pensacola Bay were built at Forts Barrancas and Pickens and on Foster's Bank (Perdido Key), west of the ruins of the mid-19th century Fort McRee. The batteries were completed in 1900 and deactivated after the end of World War I. Construction of new defenses for Pensacola Bay started in 1940, with new batteries built at the three forts. Those batteries were deactivated when World War II ended in 1945. The ruins of batteries Center, Slemmer, and 233 on Perdido Key are preserved in the Perdido Key Historic District.

== Migration and dredging ==
Pensacola Pass is shifting westward due to longshore drift. The westward flowing longshore current accretes sand on the western end of Santa Rosa Island and erodes sand from eastern end of Perdido Key. The site of the original Fort McRee, built in 1830 on the eastern end of Perdido Key, was in the channel in the middle of Pensacola Pass by 1979. Pensacola Pass has been dredged since 1883 to maintain a channel into Pensacola Bay for United States Navy and other ships. The dredging has interrupted the natural transport of sand across the inlet from Santa Rosa Island to Perdido Key, with the result that Pensacola Pass is a net sediment sink. This has starved the eastern half of Perdido Key of sand, leading to the erosion of that part of the island. The easternmost part of the island is receiving sand dredged from the inlet in a beach nourishment project.

== 2010 Gulf oil spill ==
Following the Deepwater Horizon oil spill (called the "Gulf oil spill"), the entrance to Pensacola Pass was closed, with a floating barrier system in June 2010, to control tidal flow of oil entering from the Gulf of Mexico. The daily high tide was causing oil-contaminated water to enter Pensacola Bay. The barrier system was to be designed to allow boats to travel through Pensacola Pass during the ebb tide, but to close during the rising tide.

Although this was the initial plan, the booming plan was never fully implemented. Due to strong currents in the Pass, the boom broke. There was no alternative system in place in areas of less current, nor was there a plan to trap incoming oil, therefore oil product freely entered the Pass.

== Post-Oil Spill ==
The beaches in Pensacola were Ground Zero for the oil spill. Within two weeks of making landfall, the spill had taken over the Pensacola Pass. The Gulf Oil Spill killed local wildlife and devastated the ecosystem. Fish that didn't die were still inedible, so seafood restaurants suffered. The beaches were blackened, and tourism was devastated. Tourism was the main source of income for the area, so the economy was crippled in what many called a “lost summer.”

Research shows that the major metropolitan areas between Pensacola and Panama City lost around $150 million combined per month in the months of June, July, August and September 2010. Bear in mind that 2010 was the tail end of the recession, so unemployment was already up to 10%. That summer, businesses reported 50%-80% drops in revenue.

BP Oil agreed to pay millions in settlements to local environmental efforts and economic development. This helped rejuvenate the tourist industry which skyrocketed, going from $5.4 million in 2010 to $12.3 million in 2019.

== Aftermath ==
Recent research shows that beaches affected by the spill may take over 30 years to biodegrade. However, local governments are working with volunteers to clean up the Pensacola beaches. In 2019, there were 447 petroleum cleanup sites managed with 28 sites being successfully cleaned up and closed. Major protests continue for the burning of fossil fuels, such as oil, and spreading awareness of Climate Change. Days after the oil hit shore, President Obama visited the Panama beaches and claimed that there would be “unprecedented federal response” to the historic environmental disaster.

In response to the Deepwater Horizon incident, Escambia county, which received 97% of the oil in Florida and 52 miles of the shore oiled, passed the RESTORE Act (Resources and Ecosystems Sustainability, Tourist Opportunities and Revived Economies Act). The Act states that penalty money received from the parties responsible for the oil spill will be used to protect the environment and economy of the Gulf Coast region. Other programs not under the RESTORE Act, such as the Natural Resources Damage Assessment or the National Fish and Wildlife Foundation were still funded separately through the oil spill fines.

== Other Environmental Hazards in Pensacola ==
Pensacola recently ranked No. 12 in the United States for toxic releases per square mile. With pollution from industrial plants, landfills, septic tanks and more, the Pensacola area and Escambia county are in harsh conditions.

Pollution got so bad, in fact, that in 1999 there was a special grand jury assembled to assess local air and water quality. This jury found that local regulators had been failing their task of diminishing pollution. Major corporate industries were finding loopholes in regulations or managed to convince local governments to relax them. The grand jury ultimately issued 27 specific recommendations on how the county can protect its natural resources, but many believe that these suggestions are still being ignored.

Pensacola has had multiple other major environmental disasters as well. There was the Saufley Field Landfill fire, where waste with certain toxicity levels was burnt. The fire produced hazardous gasses and particulate matter.^{[} This fire burnt for 4 months in 2005 and 2006. In 2017, there was the International Paper spill explosion that launched sticky black debris all over neighborhoods.
