= McRee =

McRee is a surname. Notable people with the surname include:

- Lake McRee (born 2002), American football player
- Lisa McRee (born 1961), American journalist and news anchor
- William McRee (1788–1833), United States Army officer

== See also ==
- Fort McRee, American Civil War fort in Florida
