= Perdido Key =

Barrier island of Alabama and Florida

Perdido Key is a 24-kilometre-long (15 mi) barrier island on the north coast of the Gulf of Mexico. The island extends from Pensacola Pass on the east to Perdido Pass on the west. Most of the island is in Florida, with the western end of the island in Alabama. Santa Rosa Island is to the east of the island, and Alabama Point is to the west. Perdido Key was attached to the mainland until the 1940s when a canal separated it from the mainland. The eastern part of the island forms part of the Gulf Islands National Seashore, which includes the Perdido Key Historic District, the site of three shore batteries that once defended Pensacola Bay. The rest of the island, with the exception of the Perdido Key State Park, has been developed as a resort and residential community. As a barrier island, Perdidio Key is subject to changes due to wave action and longshore currents, particularly from hurricanes. The endangered Perdido Key beach mouse is endemic to the island.

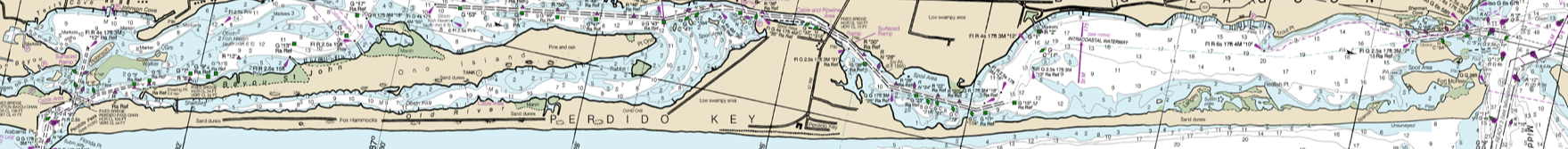
Nautical chart of Perdido Key, from Perdido Pass, Alabama (left) to Pensacola Pass, Florida, (right)

== Description ==
Perdido Key is a 24-kilometre-long (15 mi) barrier island, narrow for most of its length, with a much wider portion in the middle. The Gulf of Mexico is south of the island. Old River separates the western part of the island from Ono Island, Alabama to the north; the central and eastern parts of the island are separated from the Florida mainland by the Intracoastal Waterway and Big Lagoon, respectively. The island ends on the west at Perdido Pass and on the east at Pensacola Pass. The eastern part of the island, 11 kilometres (6.8 mi) long, is in the Gulf Islands National Seashore and is mostly undeveloped. The Perdido Key Historic District, the site of three shore batteries built between 1890 and 1945 to protect the entrance to Pensacola Bay, is at the eastern end of the island. The western part of the island is mostly developed as a resort area, although the 290 acres (120 ha) and 1.5 miles (2.4 km) of beach in the Perdido Key State Park are undeveloped, except for park facilities. Most of the island is in Florida, but the westernmost 2 miles (3.2 km) are in Alabama. The developed part of the island in Florida forms the unincorporated community of Perdido Key. The part of the island in Alabama is in the city of Orange Beach. The undeveloped part of the island has foredunes that are 4 to 5 metres (13 to 16 ft) high. Dunes behind the beach are up to 6.1 metres (20 ft) high.

Perdido Key is connected to the Florida mainland via the Theo Baars Bridge across the Intracoastal Waterway on Florida State Road 292 and to the Alabama mainland via the Perdido Pass Bridge on Alabama State Route 182. Ono Island is connected to the Alabama portion of Perdido Key by a private bridge.

== Geological history ==
Perdido Key was part of the mainland of Florida until the middle of the 20th century. Perdido Key probably developed in place by aggradation of offshore shoals consisting of quartz sand that is likely reworked from Pleistocene delta and shallow marine deposits. Perdido Key was shorter east to west for most of the 19th century than it is now. The central part of the island was originally a peninsula that was the southern end of a ridge on the mainland. Barrier spits developed from the southern point of that peninsula, extending east and west. The easternmost part of the eastern barrier spit, adjacent to Pensacola Pass, may have been an island for much of the 19th century. It was known as Foster's Bank or Foster's Island throughout the 19th century. An intermittent inlet known as New Inlet, several miles west of Pensacola Pass, closed for the last time sometime between 1880 and 1900, attaching Foster's Bank to the spit and extending it to close to its present length. (In 2020, Hurricane Sally temporarily severed the eastern end of Perdido Key from the rest of the island).

Perdido Pass, the western end of Perdido Key, was about 2 miles (3.2 km) east of its present location until early in the 20th century. The barrier spit on the western (Alabama) side of the inlet, Point Ornocor, overlapped what is now Perdido Key, extending for several miles parallel to and on the north side of Perdido Key. As a result, the water passage from Perdido Pass to Perdido Bay was long, narrow and winding, passing between Perdido Key and Point Orconor, doubling the end of the point and then passing back between the point and the Florida shore on the north side. In early 1906, local residents dug a new inlet through Point Ornocor about 2 miles (3.2 km) west of the old inlet. The new inlet was widened by the 1906 Mississippi hurricane. The old inlet then silted up and closed, with the result that the portion of Point Ornocor east of the new inlet was attached to Perdido Key and the Florida mainland. The original waterway from the old Perdido Pass to Perdido Bay became known as Old River. A passage later opened from the western end of Old River to the Bayou St. John near the new Perdido Pass, separating what is now Ono Island from Perdido Key. The spit ending on the west side of Perdido Pass is now known as Alabama Point. Alabama and Florida settled the location of the state line in 1953, placing it at the location of the old Perdido Pass. In the early 1940s the Gulf Intracoastal Waterway was constructed between Perdido Key and the mainland, including the dredging of a canal through the neck of the peninsula connecting Perdido Key to the mainland, thus turning Perdido Key into an island.

Perdido Key is shifting westward due to longshore drift. Both Pensacola Pass and Perdido Pass have historically moved westward. The westward flowing longshore current accretes sand on the up-current (eastern) sides of the passes and erodes sand from the down-current (western) sides. The site of the original Fort McRee, built in 1830 on the eastern end of Perdido Key (then known as Foster's Bank), was in the channel in the middle of Pensacola Pass by 1979. Pensacola Pass has been dredged since 1883 to maintain a channel into Pensacola Bay for United States Navy and other ships. The dredging has interrupted the natural transport of sand across the inlet from Santa Rosa Island to Perdido Key, with the result that Pensacola Pass is a net sediment sink. This has starved the eastern end of Perdido Key of sand, leading to the erosion of that part of the island.

Much of the sand that makes up Perdido Key comes from the Gulf of Mexico floor offshore of the island. About 58,000 cubic metres (76,000 cu yd) of sand is deposited on the island from offshore each year. Part of that sand is carried west by longshore currents. Another part of the sand is carried, at infrequent intervals, across the island to and beyond the north side of the islands by washovers during hurricanes. With the reduction of sand crossing Pensacola Pass due to dredging of the inlet, most of the eastern half of the island is eroding, while the western half of the islands is accreting sand. The easternmost part of the island is receiving sand dredged from the inlet in a beach nourishment project. In the period from 1920 until 2013, the easternmost 20 kilometres (12 mi) of the island lost an average of 0.17 metres (0.56 ft) of shoreline per year.

== Hurricanes ==
Perdido Key has been shaped by frequent hurricanes and tropical storms. The earliest recorded storm to affect Perdidio Key was the September 1559 hurricane which doomed the attempted Spanish colony of Ochuse on Pensacola Bay. There were at least eight major storms that struck the area in the next 200 years. Thirty hurricanes and tropical storms made landfall in the Perdido Key/Pensacola area in the century from 1889 to 1990.

Perdido Key has been severely damaged by several hurricanes since the 1970s; Frederic in 1979, Erin in August 1995, Opal in October 1995, Ivan in 2004, Dennis in 2005, and Sally in 2020 damaged or destroyed foredunes and eroded beaches, causing the shoreline to retreat northward as much as 18 metres (59 ft) in each storm. Ivan brought a 14-foot (4.3 m) storm surge to the island, damaging secondary dunes as well as washing away foredunes, and causing washovers. Sally breached the eastern end of the island in three places, creating new inlets, all of which closed again within eight months. Vegetation on Perdido Key can take many years to recover from damage caused by hurricane winds.

== Human history ==
There is scant evidence of human presence on Perdido Key prior to the 19th century. One site from the Fort Walton culture has been found on Perdido Key. There are other possible archaeological sites on the island, but repeated hurricanes have damaged or destroyed such sites. The island is unsuitable for settlement; there is no source of fresh water, no land food sources, and no land suitable for agriculture. There is no record of any European settlement on the island before 1821, when Florida was transferred from Spain to the United States.

=== Fort McRee ===
Construction began in 1831 on Fort McRee at the eastern end of the island, as part of the defenses for Pensacola Bay. The fort was damaged in the Civil War, and abandoned afterward. The site of the fort has since eroded away. By the early 1890s, all but one archway of the fort had fallen into the water. As of 1979, the site of the fort was believed to be in the channel in the middle of Pensacola Pass.

In 1898, construction was started on two coastal artillery installations, Battery Center and Battery Slemmer, at Fort McRee, to the west of the ruins of the mid-19th century fort on Foster's Bank (Perdido Key). The batteries were part of defenses for Pensacola Bay, which also included batteries at Fort Barrancas and Fort Pickens. The batteries were completed in 1900. Battery Slemmer was deactivated in 1918. Battery Center's guns were removed in 1920. Construction of new defenses for Pensacola Bay started in 1940. Battery 233 was built behind the ruins of Battery Slemmer on Perdido Key. Battery 233 had not yet received its intended guns when World War II ended in 1945 and Fort McRee, including the battery, was deactivated. The ruins of batteries Center, Slemmer, and 233 are preserved in the Perdido Key Historic District.

=== Parks ===
The Perdido Key unit of the Gulf Islands National Seashore started with the 421.3-hectare (1,041-acre) Fort McRee site at the extreme eastern end of the island, which was transferred from the US Department of Defense to the National Park Service in 1971. Rosamond Johnson Beach, just to the east of the middle of the island, was added to the national seashore in 1973. In 1977–1978, 5 miles (8.0 km) of the island between Rosamond Johnson Beach and Fort McRee were acquired and added to the Rosamund Johnson Beach Area of the national seashore.

== Ecology ==
Perdido Key has deep, sandy soils. In the undeveloped parts of the island, swales between dunes host a patchwork of mesic flatwoods, coastal scrub, and coastal grasslands. Those habitats may be flooded by storm surges, after which they are colonized by salt-tolerant species. Swampy areas north of the dunes are drained by creeks. Salt marshes occur along the north side of the island.

A long-term survey of the Perdido Key unit of the Gulf Islands National Seashore identified 384 plant species. Four plant species on the island are of concern for conservation. Chrysopsis godfreyi (Godfrey's goldenaster) is rated "imperiled" on the NatureServe conservation status scale. Schizachyrium maritimum (gulf bluestem) and Polygonum smallianum (largeleaf jointweed) are rated "vulnerable" on the NatureServe conservation status scale. Crocanthemum arenicola (syn. Helianthemum arenicola) (gulf coast frostweed) has a limited distribution, occurring only along the north coast of the Gulf of Mexico, from Franklin County, Florida to Harrison County, Mississippi.

Animals found on Perdido Key include the endangered Perdido Key beach mouse and two nesting shorebirds, Anarhynchus nivosus (snowy plover) and Sternula antillarum (least tern). Loggerhead sea turtles (Caretta caretta) occasionally lay eggs in nests on the island. Ridley sea turtles (Lepidochyles spp.) have left nests on the island on rare occasions. Various shorebirds and migrating birds use the island for resting and foraging.

== Sources ==
- Bearss, Edwin C. (March 1982). "Historic structure report and resource study: Pensacola harbor defense project, 1890-1947, Florida unit, Gulf Islands National Seashore, Escambia & Santa Rosa counties". State University Libraries of Florida.
- Looney, Paul B.; Gibson, David J.; Blyth, Amelie; Cousens, Michael I. (1993). "Flora of the Gulf Islands National Seashore, Perdido Key, Florida". Bulletin of the Torrey Botanical Club. 120 (3): 327–341. doi:10.2307/2996997. ISSN 0040-9618. JSTOR 2996997.
- Mullen, John (August 27, 2020). "Perdido Pass - Orange Beach's best known landmark". Orange Beach News.
- Schupp, Courtney A. (August 2019). Gulf Islands National Seashore Geologic Resources Inventory Report (PDF). National Park Service (Report).
- Work, Paul; Charles, Linda; Dean, Robert G. (June 1991). Perdido Key historical summary and interpretation of monitoring programs (Report). Coastal and Oceanographic Engineering Department, University of Florida – via University of Florida Digital Collections.
- Big Lagoon State Park, Tarkiln Bayou State Park, Perdido Key State Park Approved Multi-Unit Management Plan (PDF). Florida Department of Environmental Protection (Report). December 2018.
- "Perdido Key State Park History". Florida Department of Environmental Protection. 2018.
- "Perdido Pass Historical Marker". www.hmdb.org. May 25, 2019.
- "National Register of Historic Places Inventory - Nomination Form - Perdido Key Historic District" (PDF). National Park Service History. December 11, 1979.

== Connex article ==
- Perdido Key, Florida

30°17′38″N 87°27′11″W
