= Perdido Key Historic District =

Historic district in Florida, United States

- U.S. National Register of Historic Places
- U.S. Historic district
- Location within Florida Location within the United States
- Location: Escambia County, Florida
- Nearest city: Warrington
- Coordinates: 30°19′32″N 87°19′34″W
- Area: 6 acres (2.4 ha)
- Built by: US Corps of Engineers
- NRHP reference No.: 80000404
- Added to NRHP: March 10, 1980

The Perdido Key Historic District is a U.S. historic district (designated as such on March 10, 1980) located southwest of Warrington, Florida. The district is a 6-acre (24,000 m^{2}) section on the eastern tip of Perdido Key. The area was formerly a separate islet known as Foster's Bank, where Fort McRee was built.
