= Diego Miruelo =

Diego Miruelo, was an explorer and pilot who explored Florida's west coast in 1516. He may have been the first European to sail into Pensacola Bay, where he obtained some gold from the people he encountered there.

In 1516, he arrived to Florida from Cuba with one vessel Miruelo found what many authors believe to have been Pensacola Bay. He traded items of glass and iron to the people living there for gold which may have been recovered from Spanish shipwrecks.

After that, he returned to Cuba. Due to failing to take note in the course of latitudes traveled for him and not remember them, he was unable to show the way to Florida on a second trip and he went insane.
