= Big Lagoon State Park =

State park in Florida, United States

- IUCN category IV (habitat/species management area)
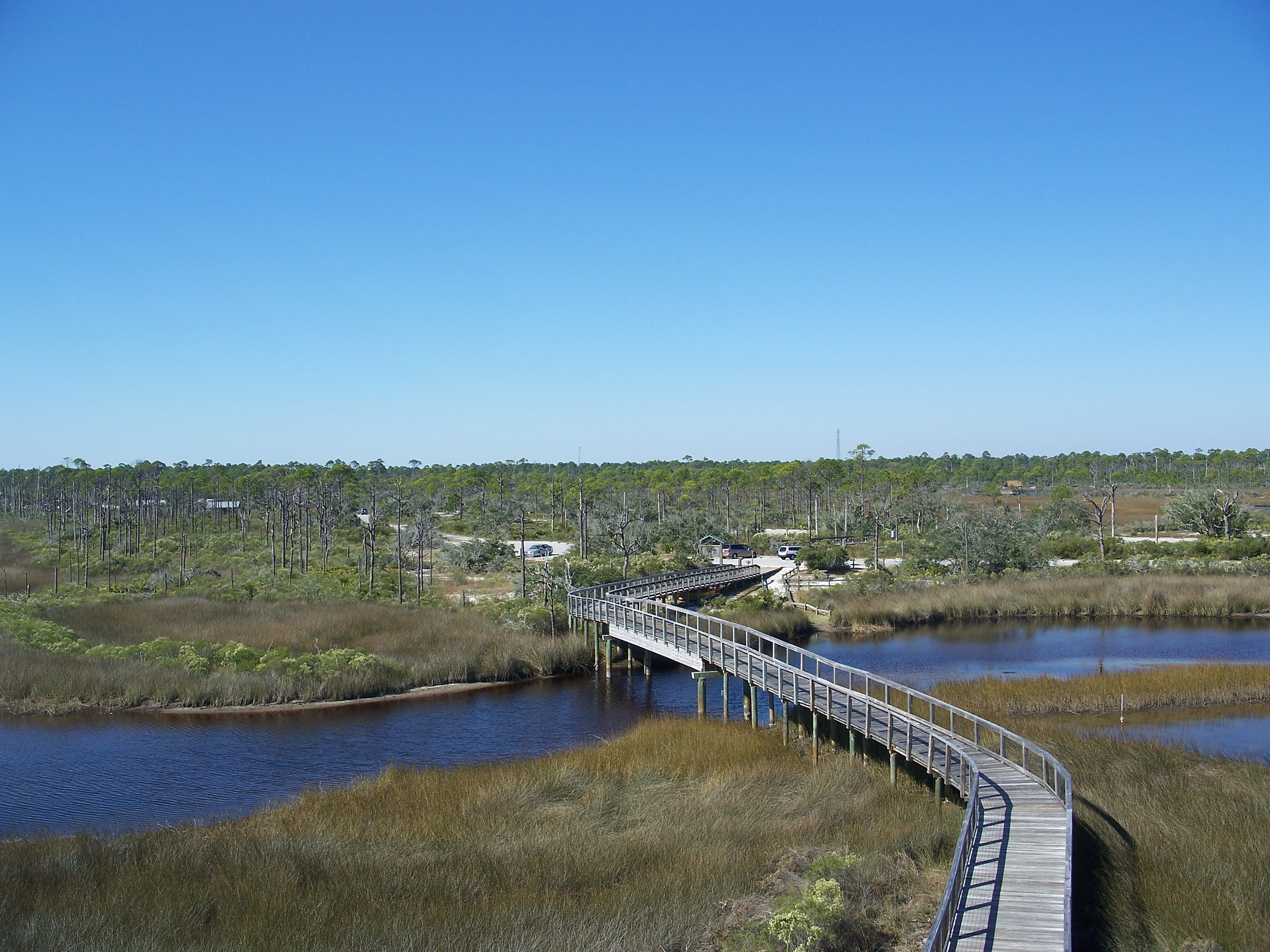
- View from observation tower

- Location within Florida Location within the United States
- Interactive map of Big Lagoon State Park
- Location: Escambia County, Florida, United States
- Nearest city: Pensacola, Florida
- Coordinates: 30°19′15″N 87°24′11″W
- Area: 706.76 acres (286.02 ha)
- Established: 1977; 49 years ago
- Governing body: Florida Department of Environmental Protection

First acquired in 1977, Big Lagoon State Park is a 706.76-acre (2.8602 km^{2}) Florida State Park located on the northwestern Florida coast, approximately 10 miles (16 km) southwest of Pensacola on Gulf Beach Highway. It encompasses the northern boundary of Big Lagoon as it snakes toward Pensacola Bay to the east. Wild Grande Lagoon and its minor tributaries lay within the boundaries of the park, as does the alligator-inhabited Long Pond, a man-made freshwater pond.

The park includes several archaeological sites. Park development in the 1980s partially disturbed a middens from the Woodland period. This and other evidence points to historical use of this maritime habitat to forage on abundant shell fish.

The park is a 'gateway site' for the Great Florida Birding Trail. It features nine distinct natural communities including estuarine tidal marsh, mesic flatwoods, wet flatwoods, and is dominated by scrubby flatwoods. The park features a number of threatened and endangered species such as the large-leaved jointweed, gopher tortoise, migratory shorebirds such as snowy plover, least tern among some twenty other listed species.

From Big Lagoon, the Florida Park Service manages two neighboring state parks - Perdido Key State Park to the southwest and Tarkiln Bayou Preserve State Park to the north.

== Recreational activities ==
The park has such amenities as beaches along the shoreline of Big Lagoon, bicycling down the 2.6-mile (4.2 km) park drive, boating from a boat ramp on the Intracoastal Waterway, canoeing along Big Lagoon, fishing, hiking along 4 miles (6.4 km) of trails, kayaking in Grande Lagoon, wildlife viewing from a three-story observation tower and footbridge overlooks at Long Pond and Grande Lagoon, picnicking at 17 shelters, swimming in Big Lagoon and 75 electrified camping sites and a group camp.

== Gallery ==
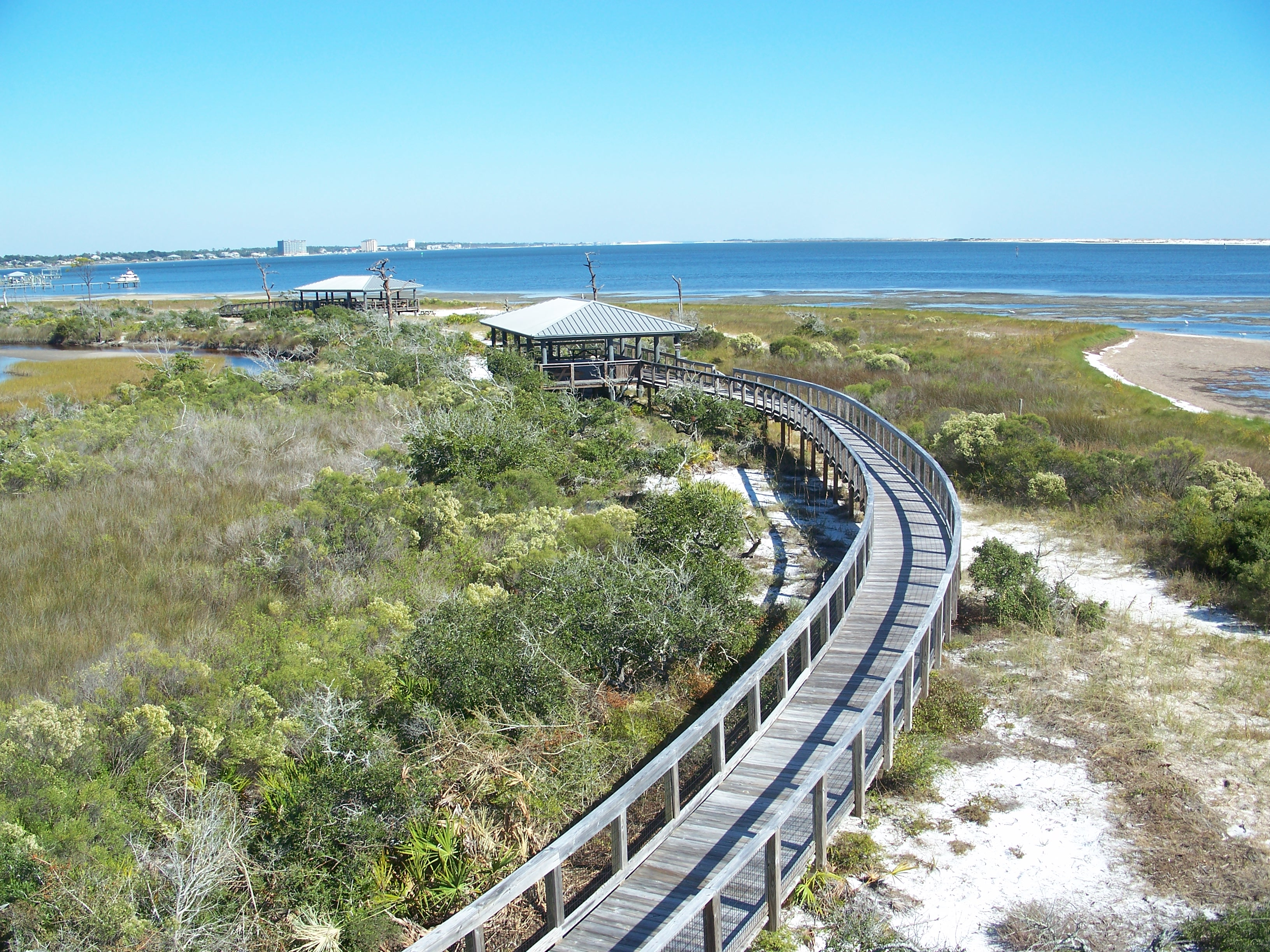
View of boardwalk from observation tower

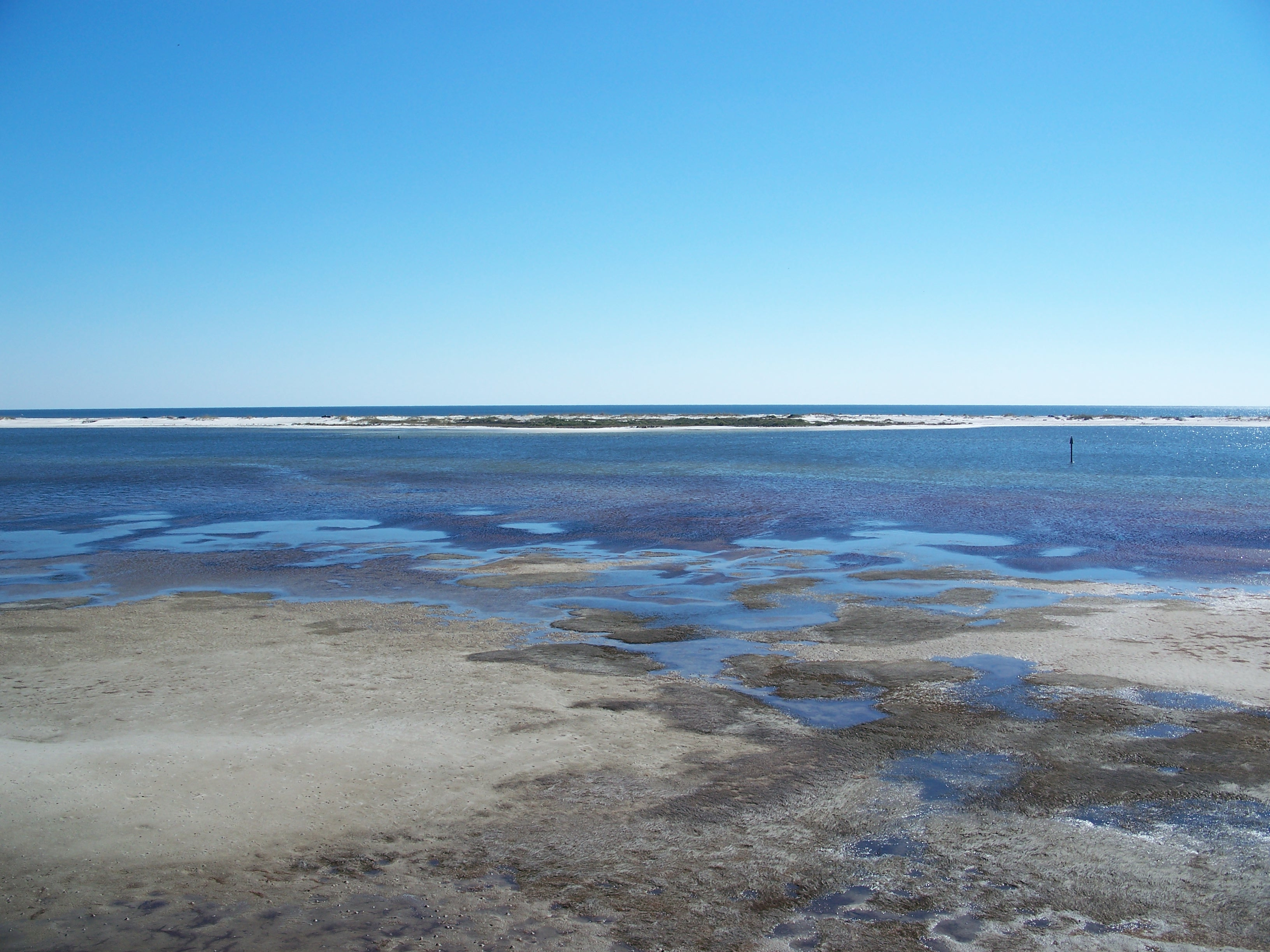
View of water from observation tower

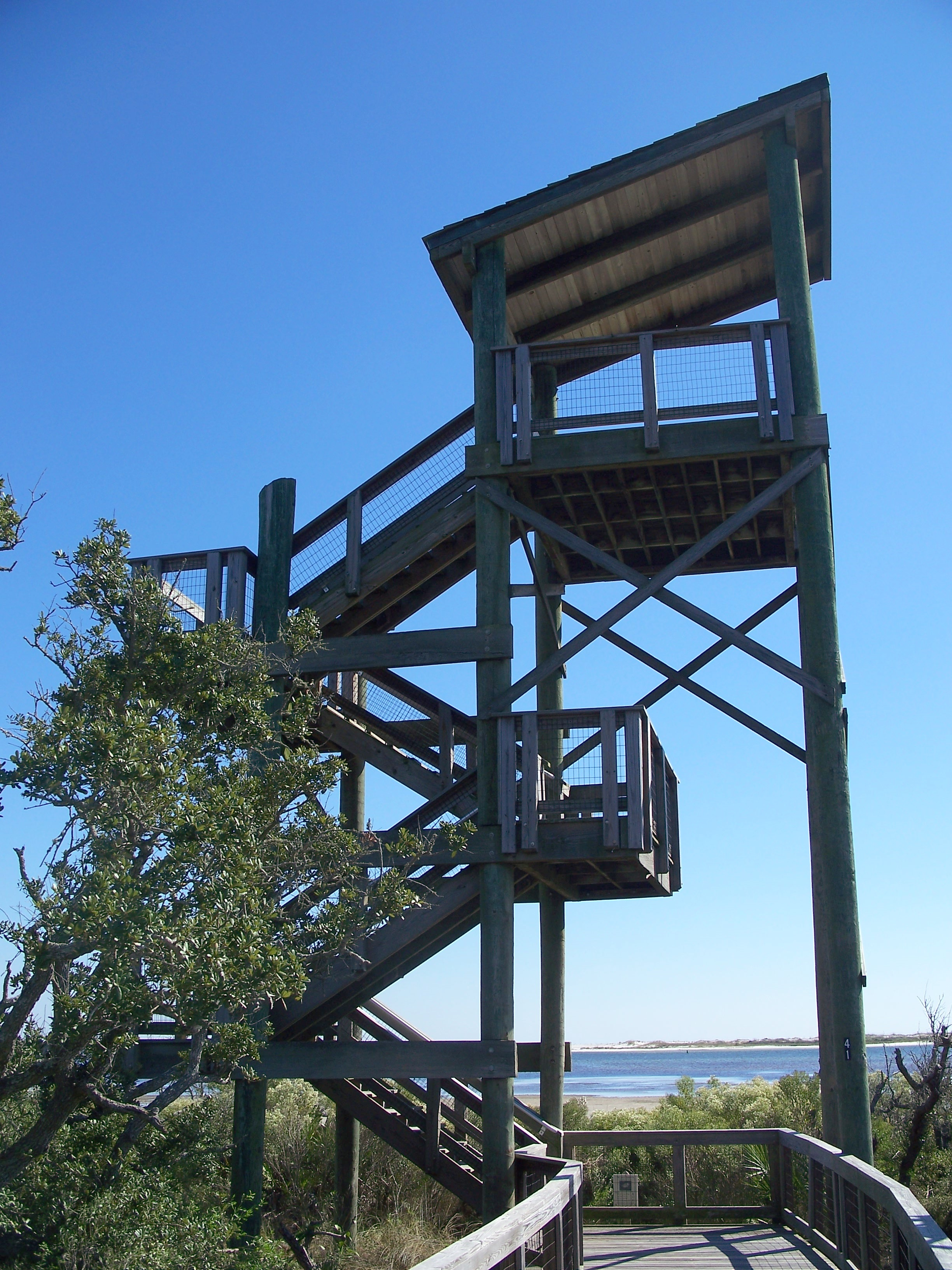
Observation tower

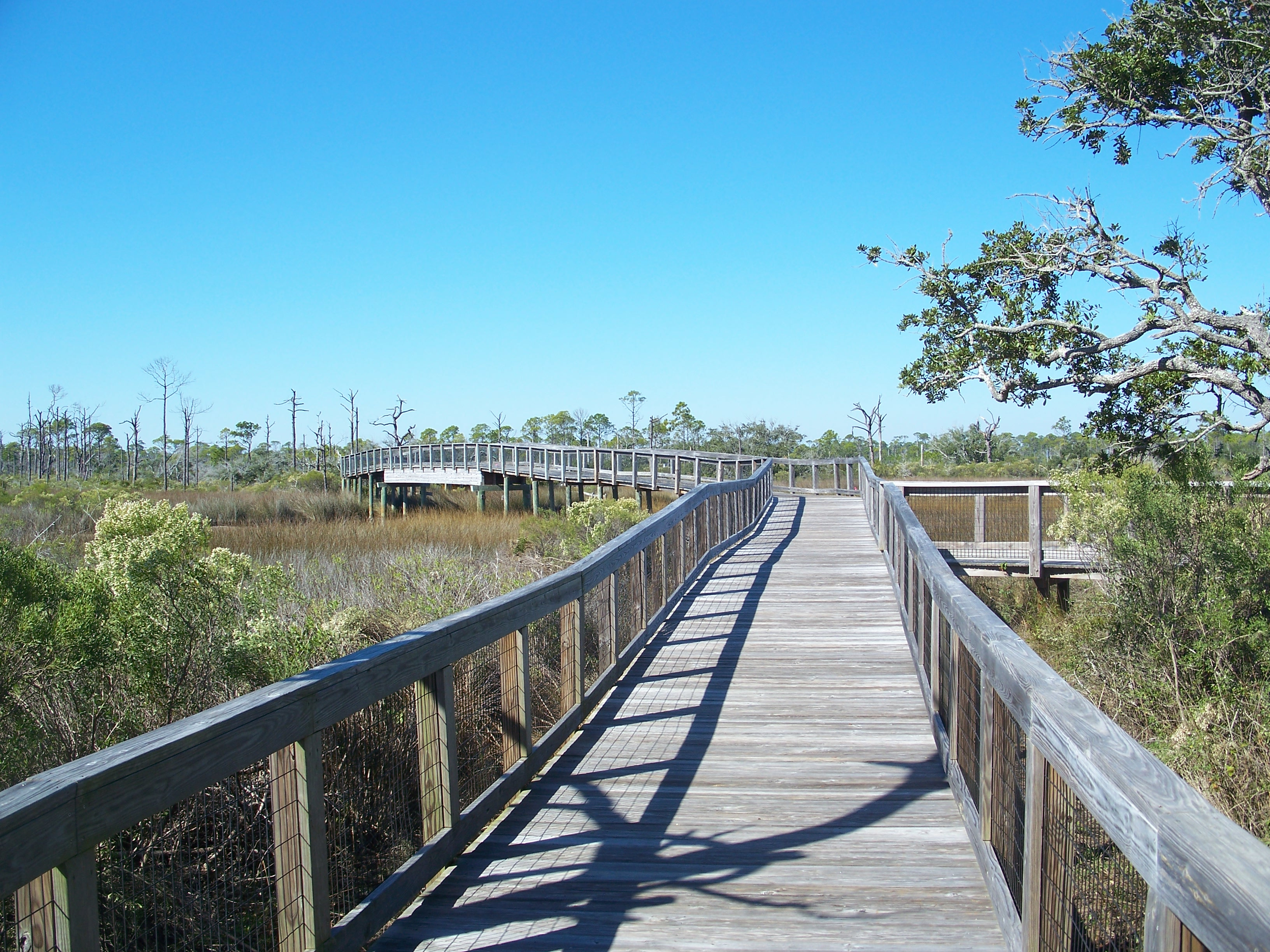
Boardwalk over marsh

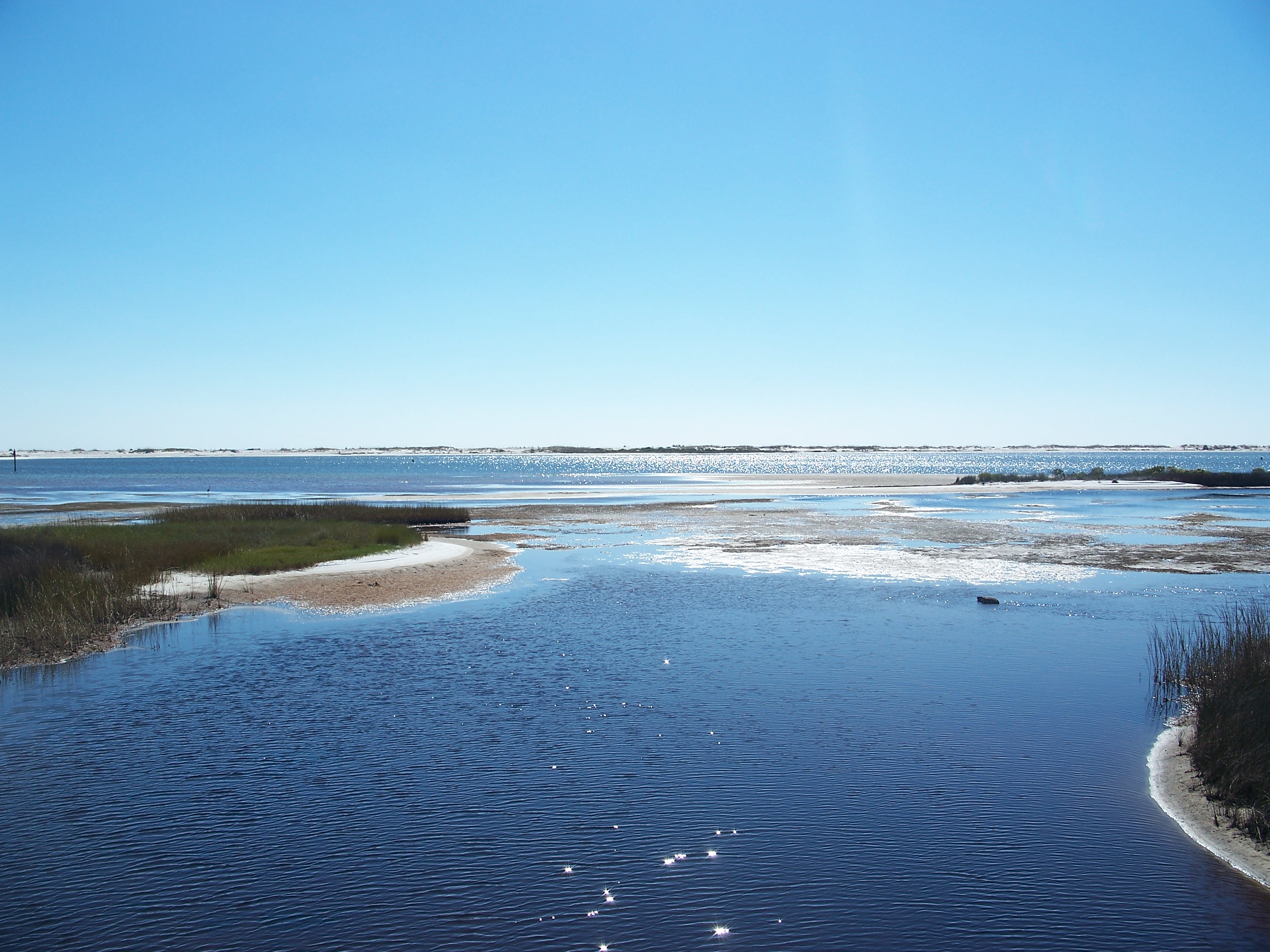
View of the water

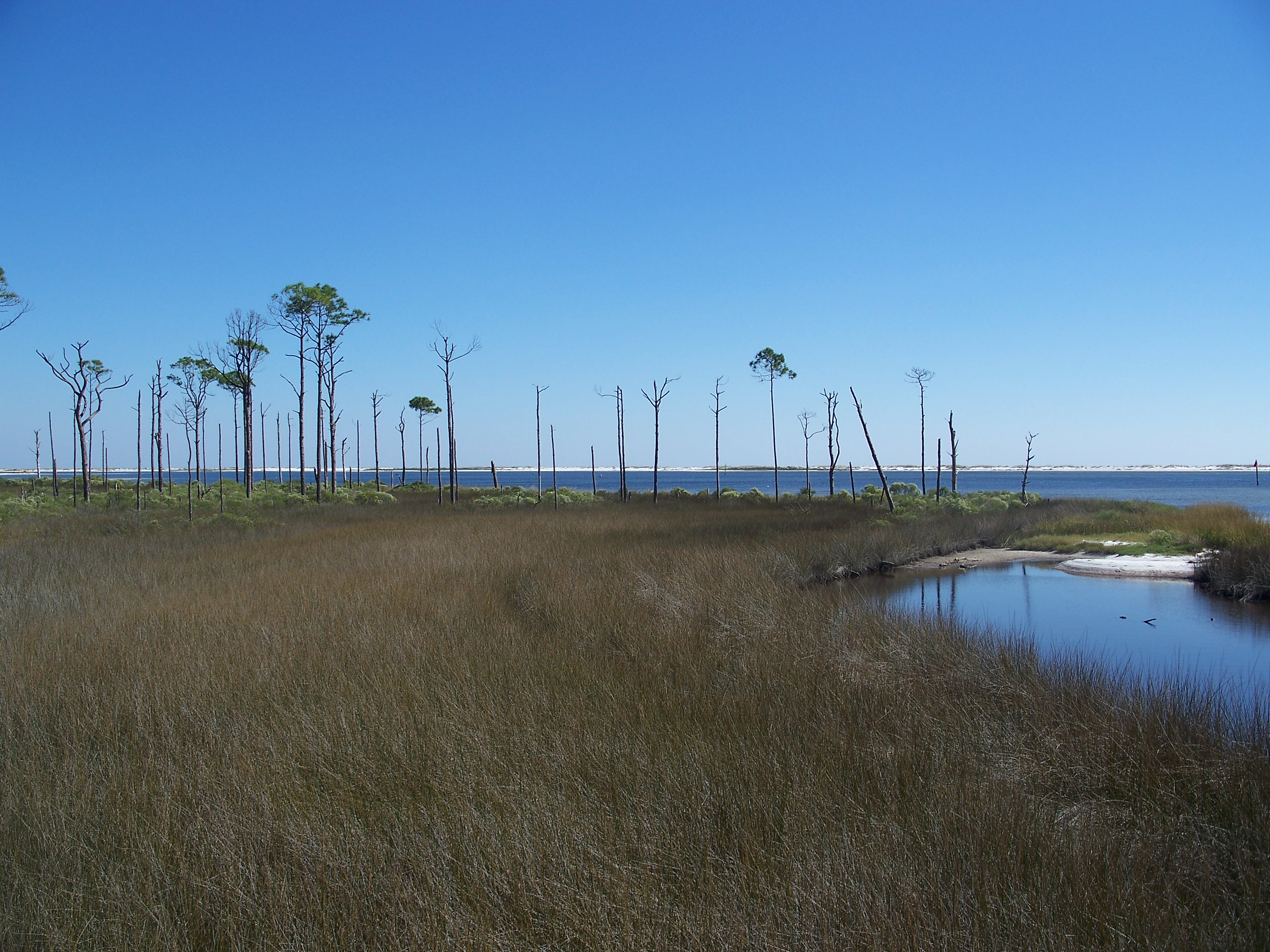
Coastal marsh and woods

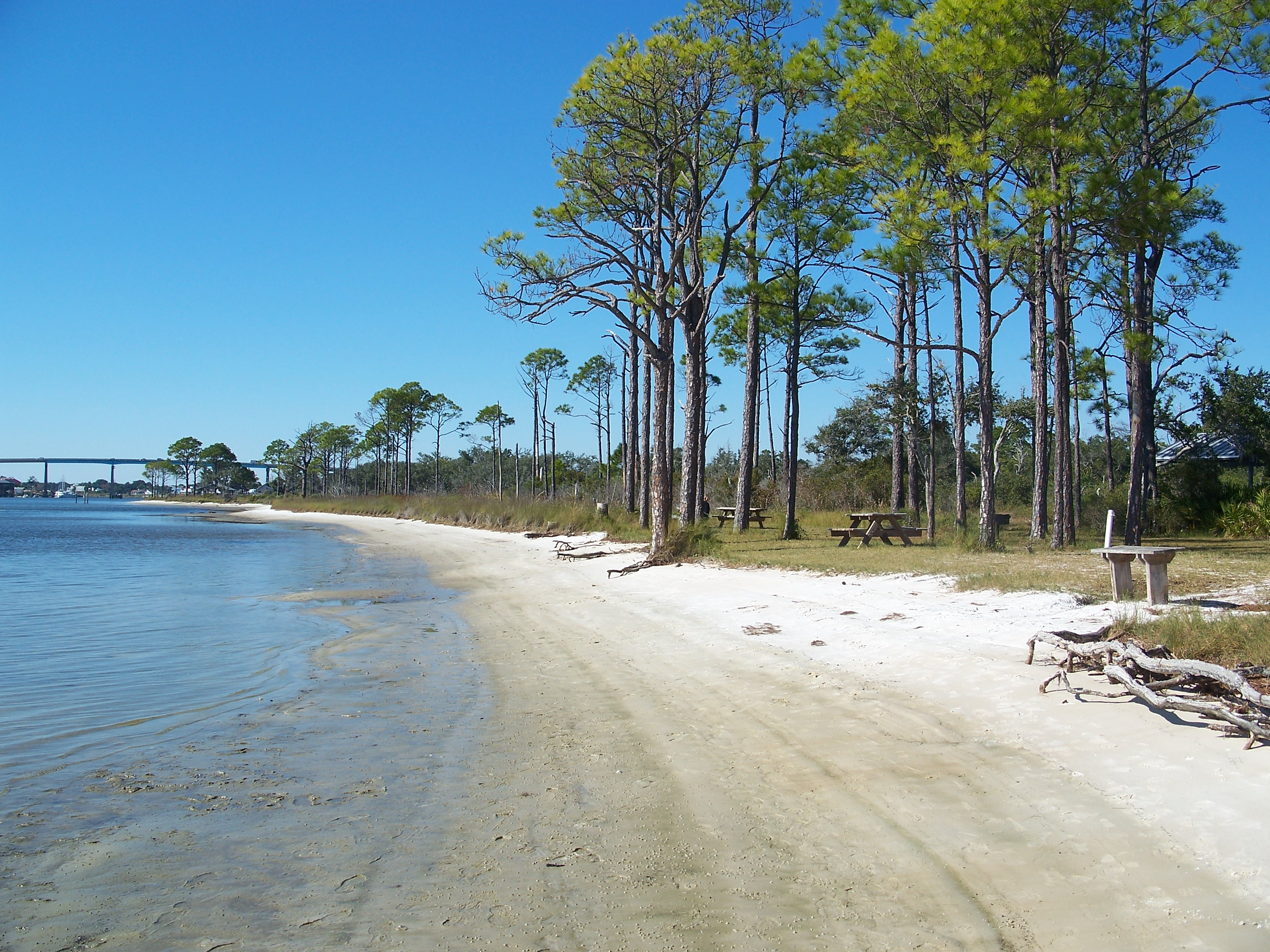
View of the shoreline
