= Great Gulfcoast Arts Festival =

Art show in Pensacola, Florida

Coordinates: 30.411°N 87.208°W

The Great Gulfcoast Arts Festival is an annual three-day, juried art show in historic Seville Square in downtown Pensacola, Florida. Established in 1973, this Festival is held the first full weekend in November. Annually, it draws over 200 painters, potters, sculptors, jewelers, graphic artists, craftsmen, mixed-media artists and others competing for $25,000 in cash awards.

== Entries ==
Show entries are by juried selection, with artists' applications generally due in early May. Show entries compete for prizes at various levels. The yearly design competitions for selecting the official GGAF poster are also juried, generally in June.
