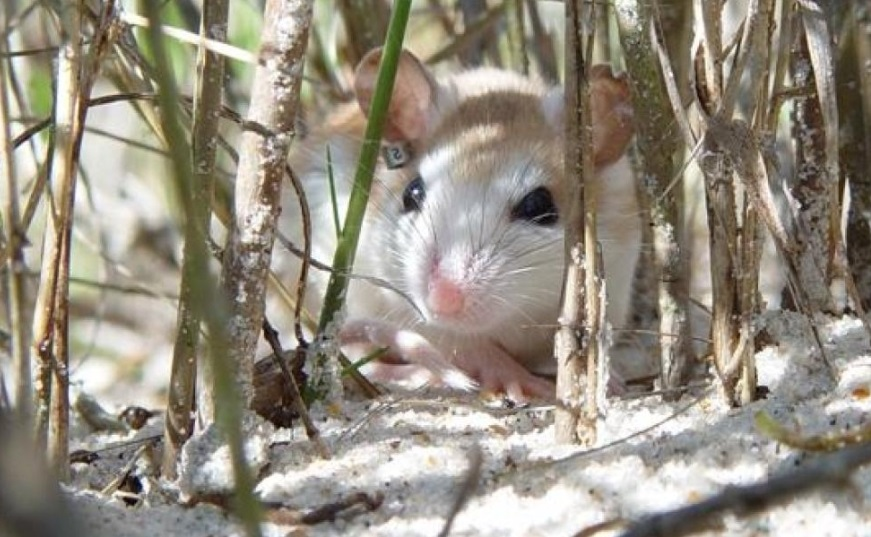

Conservation status
- Critically Imperiled (NatureServe)

- Endangered (ESA)

Scientific classification
- Kingdom: Animalia
- Phylum: Chordata
- Class: Mammalia
- Order: Rodentia
- Family: Cricetidae
- Subfamily: Neotominae
- Genus: Peromyscus
- Species: P. polionotus
- Subspecies: P. p. trissyllepsis

Trinomial name
- Peromyscus polionotus trissyllepsis Bowen, 1968

= Perdido Key beach mouse =

Subspecies of rodent

The Perdido Key beach mouse (Peromyscus polionotus trissyllepsis) is an endangered subspecies of the oldfield mouse. It is found on Perdido Key. The small white and gray mouse, weighing only 13–16 g (0.46–0.56 oz), blends in well with the white quartz sand of northern Gulf coast beaches.

== Diet ==
Dune plants are the primary source of food for the species. It feeds primarily on the seeds of sea oats and bluestem, but will occasionally eat insects. Unlike other rodents they shun people and will not eat or be near trash.

== Reproduction ==
The Perdido Key beach mouse is a nocturnal animal, spending most daylight hours in their burrows. Unlike many species, beach mice are monogamous, with mated pairs tending to remain together as long as both live. A typical beach mouse pair averages 3–4 offspring per litter and has roughly 3 litters per year.

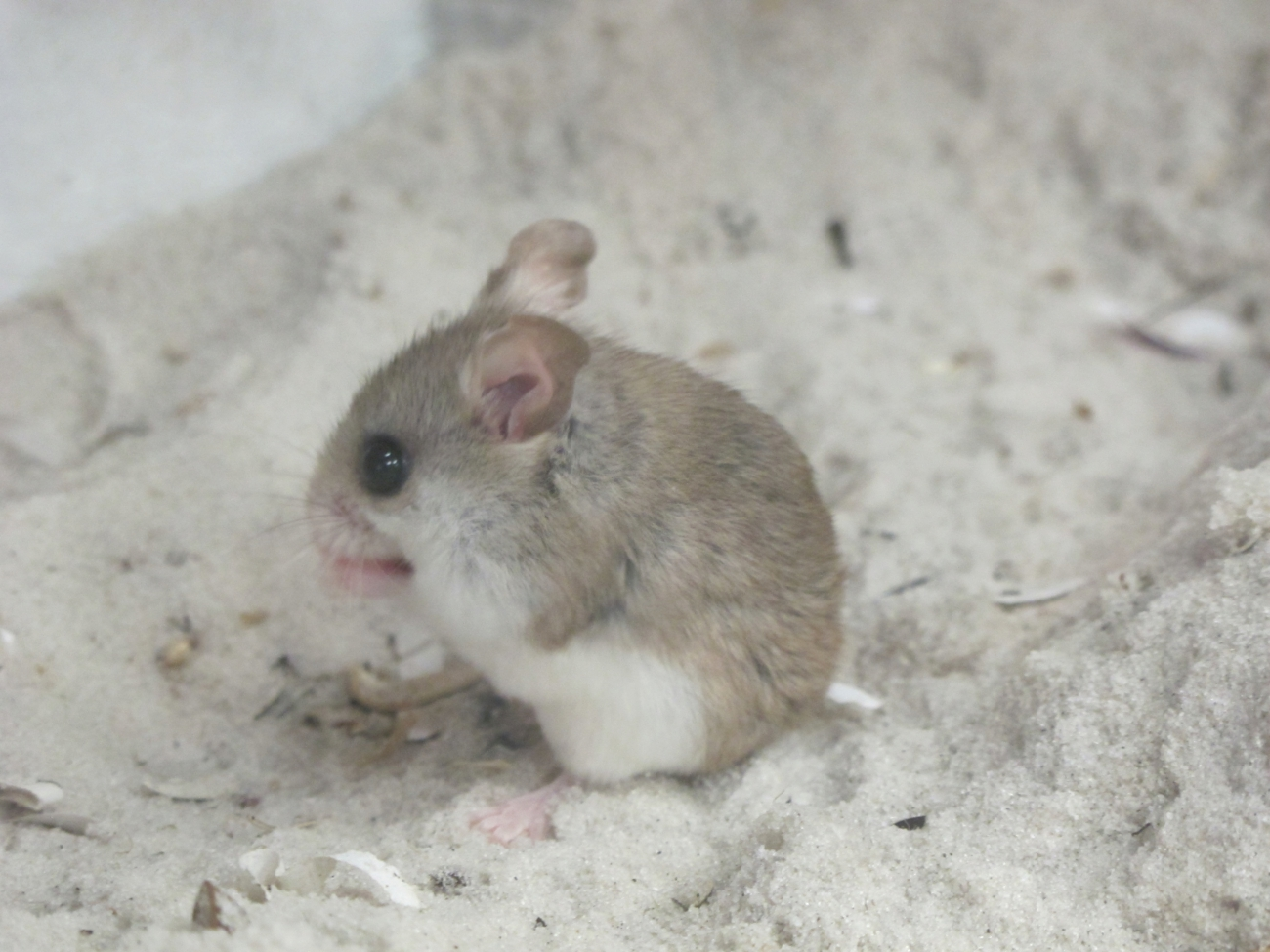
Perdido Key beach mouse on sand.

== Shelter ==
In contrast to its inland relatives, the Perdido Key beach mouse avoids humans, buildings and trash, instead preferring to meander among the dunes near its burrow. Mouse burrows are usually located in the dunes at the base of a shrub, clump of grass or near some vegetated cover. The burrow itself consists of an entrance, a nest cavity, and an escape tube which is closed off but near the surface of the sand. If an intruder, such as a snake or crab, enters a beach mouse burrow, mice make a hasty retreat out the escape tube.

== Conservation ==
The species was listed as an endangered species in 1985. Loss of habitat to development is considered to be the main factor which led to the decline of the species. Hurricanes have also taken their toll on the endangered mouse. The beach mouse population at Perdido Key was nearly made extinct in the mid-1990s when hurricanes Erin and Opal ravaged the key's beaches. Numbering less than 40 after the storms, the mice have regenerated with current population estimates near 500. While populations appear to be growing, the mouse will probably never be delisted because of continued habitat loss and degradation.
