= William McRee =

American military engineer (1787–1833)

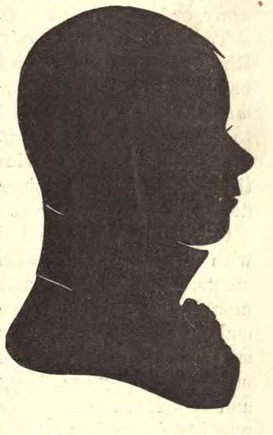
- Born: 13 December 1787; Wilmington
- Died: 15 May 1833 (aged 45); St. Louis
- Alma mater: United States Military Academy
- Occupation: Combat engineer
- Parent(s): Griffith John McRee

William McRee was an officer in the United States Army and later a Surveyor General of the United States. Fort McRee was named in his honor.

== Early life ==
McRee was born in December 1787 in Wilmington, North Carolina. He was the son of Major Griffith John McRee, a veteran of the American Revolution, and the daughter of Dr. John Fergus of Wilmington.

== Military career ==
McRee was an 1805 graduate of the United States Military Academy and received his commission as a second lieutenant into the Army Corps of Engineers on 1 July 1805. From 1806 until 1808, he served as an assistant engineer surveying sites for coastal fortifications in the southern US. In 1808 he transferred to Charleston, South Carolina where he was involved in construction of defenses for that city's harbor.

During the War of 1812, McRee was chief of artillery for the Northern Army then chief engineer for the Army of the Niagara Frontier. For gallant conduct in the Battle of Niagara he was brevetted to lieutenant colonel. For distinguished and meritorious service at the defense of Fort Erie, he was brevetted to colonel.

After the War of 1812, McRee traveled to Europe where he served in Belgium and France surveying fortifications in those countries from 1815 to 1817.

Upon his return to the US in 1817, McRee served on the Board of Engineers where he took part in the two-year general survey of America's coastal defenses.

In bitter protest to the appointment of the foreign officer General Simon Bernard as the assistant to the chief of engineers, McRee resigned his officer's commission and was discharged from the military on 31 March 1819.

== Post-military career ==
From February, 1825 until July, 1832, McRee served as Surveyor General of the United States for the territories of Illinois, Missouri and Arkansas.

McRee died on 15 May 1833 in St. Louis, Missouri.

In an ironic twist, it was General Bernard, the foreign officer that McRee so despised, that designed the seacoast fort that would eventually be named after McRee.
