= Simon Bernard =

French army general (1779–1839)

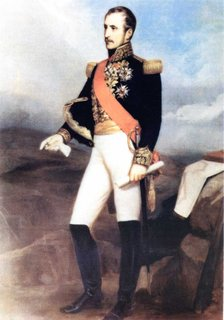
- Born: April 28, 1779; Dole, France
- Died: November 5, 1839 (aged 60); Paris, France
- Education: École polytechnique
- Military career
- Allegiance: France; United States
- Branch: French Army; United States Army
- Service years: 1794 - 1839
- Rank: Lieutenant-general
- Conflicts: Napoleonic Wars
- Awards: Grand Cross of the Legion of Honour; Imperial baron; Knight of Saint Louis

Baron Simon Bernard (French: [simɔ̃ bɛʁnaʁ]; 28 April 1779 – 5 November 1839) was a French general of engineers. Born in Dole, Simon Bernard was educated at the École polytechnique, graduating as second in the promotion of 1799 and entered the army in the corps of engineers.

== French military service ==
He rose rapidly, becoming a captain in 1800 and a major in 1809. After being involved in the works to the Port of Antwerp, Bernard served (1809–1812) as aide-de-camp to Napoléon. Promoted to colonel in 1813, he was wounded in the retreat after the battle of Leipzig and distinguished himself the same year (1813) in the gallant three month defense of the besieged city of Torgau against the allies.

After Napoléon's first abdication he rallied to the Bourbons and was promoted to general de brigade by Louis XVIII and made a knight of Saint Louis. Bernard was tasked by the minister of war Clarke with topographical work. After Napoléon's return from Elba, Bernard rallied to the emperor and took part in the battle of Waterloo in 1815.

== Service in the United States Army ==
After the emperor's second abdication he was banished from France and, refusing an offer for employment from czar Alexander I of Russia, emigrated to the United States, where he was accepted as an assistant engineer with the rank and pay of a brigadier-general of engineers on November 16, 1816. He designed a number of extensive forts for the Army, notably Fort Monroe and Fort Wool in Virginia, Fort Adams in Newport, Rhode Island, Fort Morgan in Alabama, Fort McRee in Florida and Fort Pulaski in Georgia. During Marquis de LaFayette's famous trip to the United States in 1824–1825, the Marquis admired Fort Monroe, the Old Point Comfort stronghold which had also been designed by Bernard.

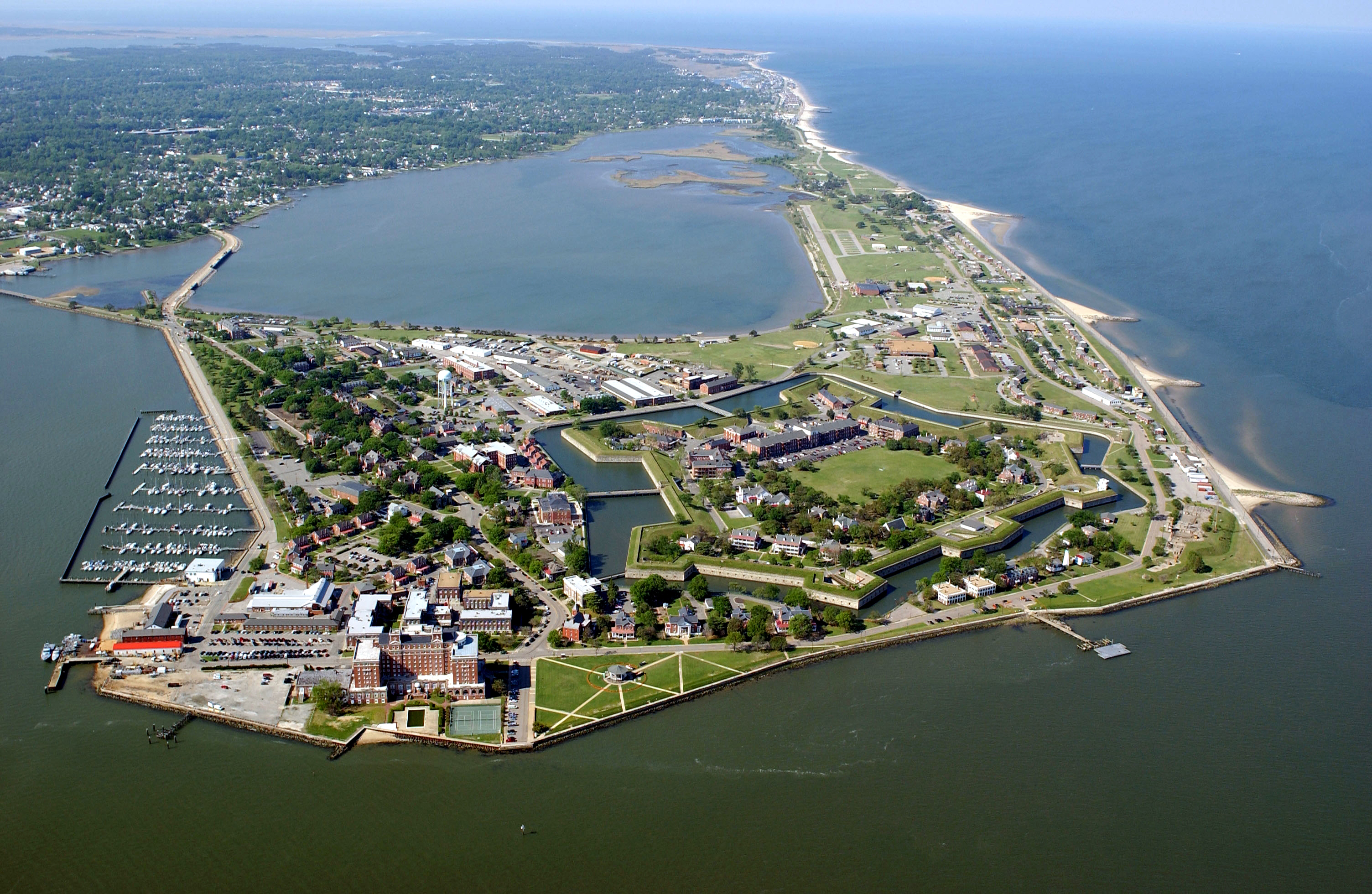
Fort Monroe, the most famous work of general Bernard

During his time in America, he was a member of the prestigious Columbian Institute for the Promotion of Arts and Sciences, which counted among its members presidents Andrew Jackson and John Quincy Adams and many prominent men of the day, including well-known representatives of the military, government service, medical and other professions. In 1829, under the employ of the U.S. congress, Bernard completed a survey to discover the feasibility of a Cross Florida Canal.

He resigned from the United States Army on August 10, 1831.

== Return to France ==
He returned to France after the July Revolution of 1830 and he was made a lieutenant-général by Louis Philippe I. He was named to the general committee on fortifications and was tasked with drafting the plans to improve the fortifications of Paris. He was made a peer of France in 1834. He served twice as minister of war. In 1834 he held the post for eight days (between November 10 and 18) and again from September 1836 to March 1839 under Louis-Mathieu Molé.

General Bernard died in Paris on November 5, 1839.

== See also ==
- Fort Zachary Taylor Historic State Park

Political offices
Preceded by Étienne Maurice Gérard	Minister of War; 10 November 1834 – 18 November 1834	Succeeded by Édouard Adolphe Casimir Joseph Mortier
Preceded by Nicolas Joseph Maison	Minister of War; 6 September 1836 – 31 March 1839	Succeeded by Amédée Louis Despans-Cubières
