= Fort McRee =

Former fort near Pensacola, Florida

Coordinates: 30°19′33″N 87°19′01″W

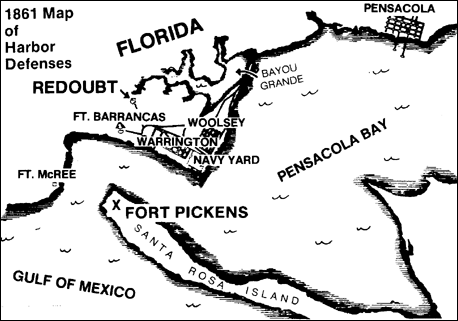
In this map based on an 1861 sketch of Pensacola Bay defenses, Fort McRee can be seen at left.

Fort McRee was a historic military fort constructed by the United States on the eastern tip of Perdido Key to defend Pensacola and its important natural harbor. In the defense of Pensacola Bay, Fort McRee was accompanied by Fort Pickens, located across Pensacola Pass on Santa Rosa Island, and Fort Barrancas, located across Pensacola Bay on the grounds of what is now Naval Air Station (NAS) Pensacola. Fort Pickens was the largest of these. Very little remains of Fort McRee today.

== History ==
=== Design and construction ===
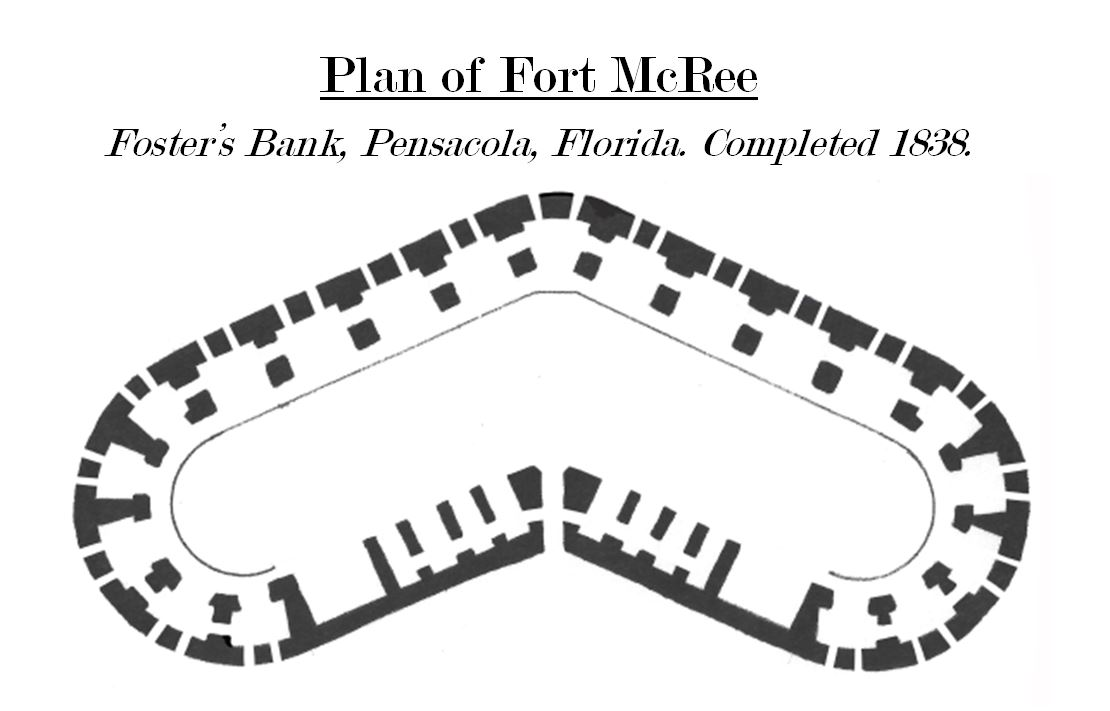
Diagram of Fort McRee

Fort McRee was one of three major installations constructed by the United States to strengthen defenses at Pensacola Bay following the War of 1812. Its construction lasted from 1834 to 1839; the facility was a three-tiered fort and a detached water battery close to sea level. It was located on the eastern tip of Perdido Key on a stretch of beach known as Foster's Bank. It had a highly unusual shape because of its position on a small, narrow barrier island.

Fort McRee had a strange boomerang shape, of a rather archaic design. In this design, it had 19 casemates (4 on each face, 1 on the tip, and 5 on each wing), each capable of mounting 4 cannons. However, General Simon Bernard's plans for the fort called for 8 of the casemates to be used as quarters and store rooms, and 2 of the 8 were to be used as powder magazines. This left the wings of the fort rather under defended, but it still left 44 casemated guns aiming at Pensacola Pass, which was enough to stop enemy ships.

The landward facing walls of the fort, containing the Sally Port, were known as the gorge. The large rooms on the ends of the gorge were also powder magazines, and each of them were 17 x 35 feet in area. The Sally Port was 12 feet wide. The gorge was designed to have 6 casemates- 3 on either face- to be used as quarters. In each, it was possible to mount 1 carronade.

Although the fort was completed in 1839, its 122 guns were not installed until sometime between 1843 and 1845. It is likely that many of these guns were not in place for some time due to several issues, the most important of which was a problem with rot beginning in the second tier wooden decking.

Fort McRee was named in April 1840 for Army engineer Colonel William McRee.

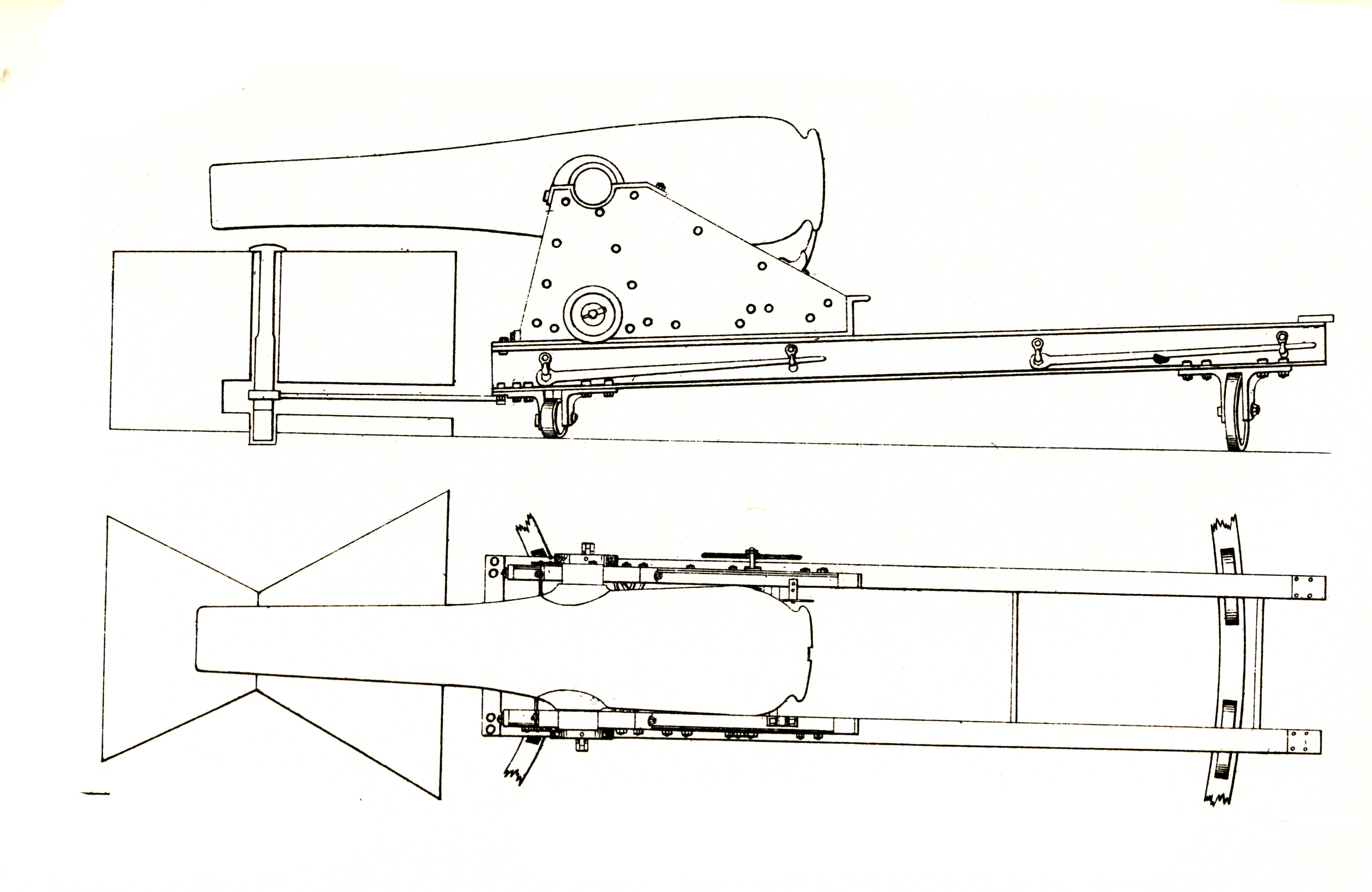
A diagram of the Columbiad gun, 15 of which were present at Fort McRee at the outbreak of the Civil War. There were the heaviest form of artillery available at the fort at the time.

=== Early use ===
The first troops stationed at Fort McRee, the men of I Company, 3rd Artillery, arrived on 2 May 1842. These men were joined by E Company, 7th Infantry in July. From this time until October 1845, when much of the artillery unit was ordered to Louisiana, the fort was manned at various levels.

After the Mexican–American War was finished in 1848, barracks were built near Fort Barrancas on the mainland. Once these were completed, Fort McRee was manned only during drills, maneuvers and target practice. The strength of the entire US Army on 1 December 1853 was reported at 10,417, so commanders had to be effective in use of troops. The other two Pensacola area forts were manned in a similar way until the outbreak of the Civil War.

=== Civil War action ===
With less than 50 men to occupy all three fortifications in Pensacola, First Lieutenant Adam J. Slemmer (the senior Army officer present) decided to concentrate his small force in a more defensible location. January 8, 1861 the Union soldiers at Fort Barrancas fired upon the Florida Militia effectively firing the first shots of the war. Over 9 and 10 January 1861, his garrison spiked the guns of Barrancas and McRee then moved across the bay to Fort Pickens. The move was a timely one as on 12 January, Florida and Alabama militia arrived and took control of the evacuated fortifications.

Over the next several months, both sides built new cannon batteries and brought in more personnel. The opposing forces engaged in cannon duels many times but with little effect. Near the end of the year, manning stood at about 7,000 men on the Confederate side opposed by 2,000 Union soldiers around Fort Pickens.

On 9 October 1861 the commander of Confederate forces in Pensacola, General Braxton Bragg, ordered an assault on Fort Pickens that was ultimately unsuccessful. Colonel Harvey Brown, the commander of Union forces, felt this attack required an answer and planned an attack of his own. Fort McRee, the closest fortification to Fort Pickens and a road block to any attempted assault on Pensacola, was to be the primary target.

Starting on the morning of 22 November 1861, Fort McRee was bombarded heavily by Union forces at Fort Pickens, and by two ships, Niagara and Richmond. Initially returning strong fire, the Confederates were able to hold their own and even managed to heavily damage the Richmond. However, the combined efforts of the two ships eventually led to the suppression of fire by an adjacent battery early in the afternoon with the guns of Fort McRee falling silent by 5pm. A fall in tide and the onset of darkness caused the two ships to withdraw.

After the days fight, General Bragg sent messengers out to ascertain the extent of damage to the Confederate defenses. The commander of Fort McRee, Colonel John B. Villepique, advised that his position was heavily exposed on most sides and that half his weapons had been dismounted and their powder stores unprotected. Villepique stated he was unable to return fire and asked to sabotage the fort and withdraw. Worried about the effect the retreat would have not only on his men but the enemy as well, Bragg denied the request.

At 10am on 23 November, the Niagara resumed its attack on Fort McRee as did the cannons at Fort Pickens. The guns of Fort McRee remained silent. The end of fighting that day signaled the end of the Colonel Brown's attack. Although Fort McRee survived, it was badly battered. Large chunks of the wall were blown away while other portions had holes shot clean through by the cannon shells. In one area a section of wall totally collapsed. Most of the wood decking within the fort had gone up in flames while one powder magazine caved in, killing six Confederates in the process.

The actions on 22 and 23 November would be the last engagement for Fort McRee. Although there was an artillery duel on 1 January 1862, the fort was not a participant in that action.

When Confederate forces abandoned Pensacola in May 1862, they burned Fort McRee and several other buildings in the area believed to be of strategic value. No mention in surviving records indicate that any repairs were made or even attempted on the fort by Union forces.

=== Post-war neglect ===
Battered and burned is how Fort McRee remained for the next three decades. The only actions taken were to stem the erosion of the beach by the construction of two jetties. An example of this neglect can be seen in an 1871-1872 expenditures report which recorded a total of $191.29 being spent on maintaining the fort.

In 1875, the War Department authorized the commander of Fort Barrancas to remove 50,000 bricks from Fort McRee to build walkways and make structural repairs at his location.

In 1885, a group of businessmen offered to purchase the remaining structure of Fort McRee for $500. This request was denied by the Army Corps of Engineers on the basis that the remaining bricks were worth more to the War Department as a source of material for repairing Fort Barrancas and structures at the nearby Navy yard.

=== Activity returns ===
With the completion of the Endicott Board and the subsequent renewed interest in strengthening the coastal defenses of the US, activity returned to Fort McRee. In 1898 a battery of two 8-inch rifled guns were constructed just west of the fort. It was named Battery Slemmer in honor of the Union officer who evacuated Pensacola at the start of the Civil War.

In 1899 a battery of rapid fire guns were installed and named Battery Center after Lieutenant J. P. Center, an officer killed at the Battle of Lake Okeechobee.

Batteries Slemmer and Center were manned by members of the US Army Coast Artillery Corps, with between 50 and 100 personnel who were rotated from Fort Barrancas.

A hurricane that struck on 26–27 September 1906 destroyed most of the newer structures that had been erected since 1898. After the hurricane, only a minimal caretaker staff remained to ensure the security of the site. With America's entry into World War I in 1917, the guns of Battery Slemmer were removed and sent to Europe for mounting on railway cars. In 1920, the guns of Battery Center were declared surplus and removed as well. With the removal of these guns, Fort McRee once again fell into disuse.

=== Final military use ===
With the onset of World War II, activity once again returned to Fort McRee. A battery of two 6-inch shield guns with a range of 15 miles was planned for the site. Foundations were poured and the gun carriages received. However, the war ended before the guns were put in place and the site, known as Battery 233, was abandoned.

With the end of World War II came the end of the need for fixed coastal defenses. In 1947, Fort Barrancas was deactivated and ownership transferred to NAS Pensacola. As a sub-post of Barrancas, Fort McRee was included in this transfer.

The US Navy managed the forts until 1971 when Fort Barrancas, along with Fort Pickens, was turned over to the National Park Service and became part of Gulf Islands National Seashore. This ended nearly 140 years of military ownership for Fort McRee.

=== Fort McRee today ===
Of the three forts that once protected Pensacola, Forts Pickens and Barrancas were preserved first through continued use and later as historic sites. However, due to its location on a site accessible only by foot or boat, Fort McRee was left to the elements. Storms and erosion took their toll on the site. Today, nothing more than a few scattered foundations remain.

Because the land on which Fort McRee once stood now belongs to the National Park Service, it is open to anyone visiting Gulf Islands National Seashore. However, the area is remote and no visitor facilities of any kind exist. Additionally, the use of metal detectors is prohibited and any artifacts found are not to be removed from the site.

== Location confusion ==
The actual location of Fort McRee is open to some speculation. Foster's Bank has seen much change over the past 170-plus years, shrinking and growing from the effects of weather and the sea. Warfare, fires, weather and recycling all but reduced the fort to its foundations. Combined, these conditions have left very little physical evidence of the structures.

Adding to the confusion are two differing sets of coordinates listed for the site by the US Coast Guard in an 1882 survey. One set of coordinates places the fort at latitude 30 degrees 30 minutes 19 seconds, longitude 87 degrees 48 minutes 18 seconds in which case the fort lies just on shore of the present day remains of Foster's Bank. The other set of coordinates places the fort at latitude 30 degrees 29.4 minutes 19 second, longitude 87 degrees 46.8 minutes 18 seconds which puts the fort under water just off the beach.

== See also ==
- Fort Pickens - fort across the bay, on Santa Rosa Island.
- Fort Barrancas - fort on the mainland, at Pensacola, Florida.
