= Perdido Key State Park =

State park in Florida, United States

- IUCN category IV (habitat/species management area)
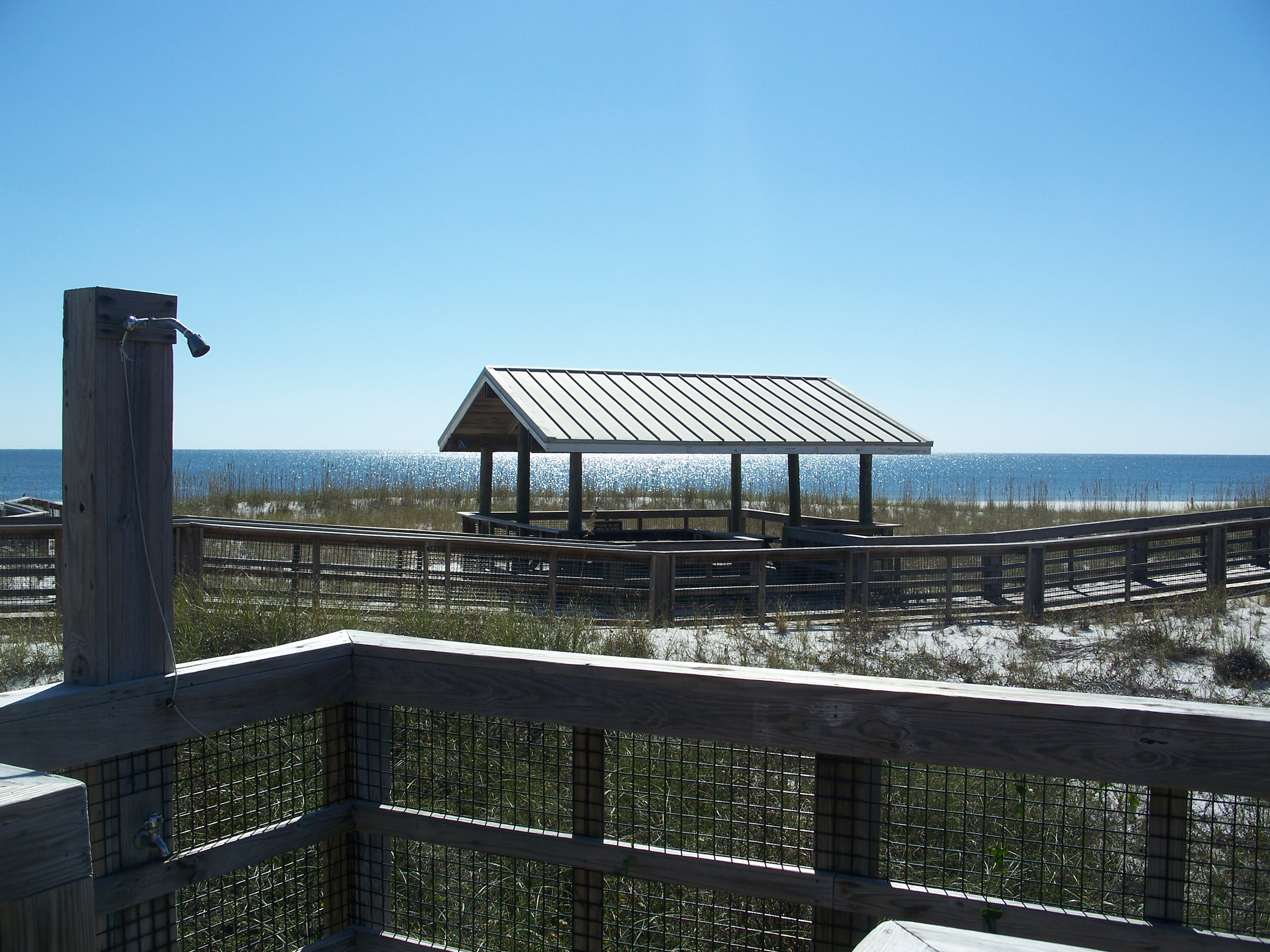
- Access to beach

- Location within Florida Location within the United States
- Interactive map of Perdido Key State Park
- Location: Escambia County, Florida, USA
- Nearest city: Pensacola, Florida
- Coordinates: 30°17′24″N 87°28′19″W
- Area: 302.9 acres (122.6 ha)
- Governing body: Florida Department of Environmental Protection

Perdido Key State Park is a 302.9-acre (1.226 km^{2}) Florida State Park located on a barrier island fifteen miles (24 km) southwest of Pensacola, off S.R. 292, in northwestern Florida. The park's address is 15301 Perdido Key Drive.

== Perdido Key State Park ==
Barrier islands protect the Florida mainland from the harsh effects of storms and provide habitats for shorebirds and other coastal animals. The wide, white, sandy beaches and the rolling sand dunes covered with sea oats make this a pristine oasis along the rapidly developing panhandle. The beach, which provides excellent opportunities for swimming and sunbathing, is the focal point for public use of the park. Surf fishing is another popular activity. Boardwalks from the parking lot allow visitors to access the beach without causing damage to the fragile dunes and beach vegetation. Covered picnic tables overlooking are provided for group outings.

=== Wildlife ===
Several endangered species inhabit, nest on or use this park. Most notable of these is the Perdido Key beach mouse. This mouse is one of the North America's rarest mammals and only currently exists in two places on earth, both of which are located on Perdido Key. The Johnson Beach Unit of Gulf Islands National Seashore is the other location. The mouse was reintroduced to the park in February 2000 after several years of being absent from the park. Originally, three pairs of juvenile mice were translocated from Johnson Beach, followed by an additional 16 pairs of juvenile mice the following year. The population of this mouse can vary greatly depending on the time of year and recent weather conditions, as well as the presence of house cats.

Loggerhead sea turtles use the beach to nest each year. Occasionally green and Kemp's Ridley sea turtles will nest within the park boundary as well.

== Gallery ==
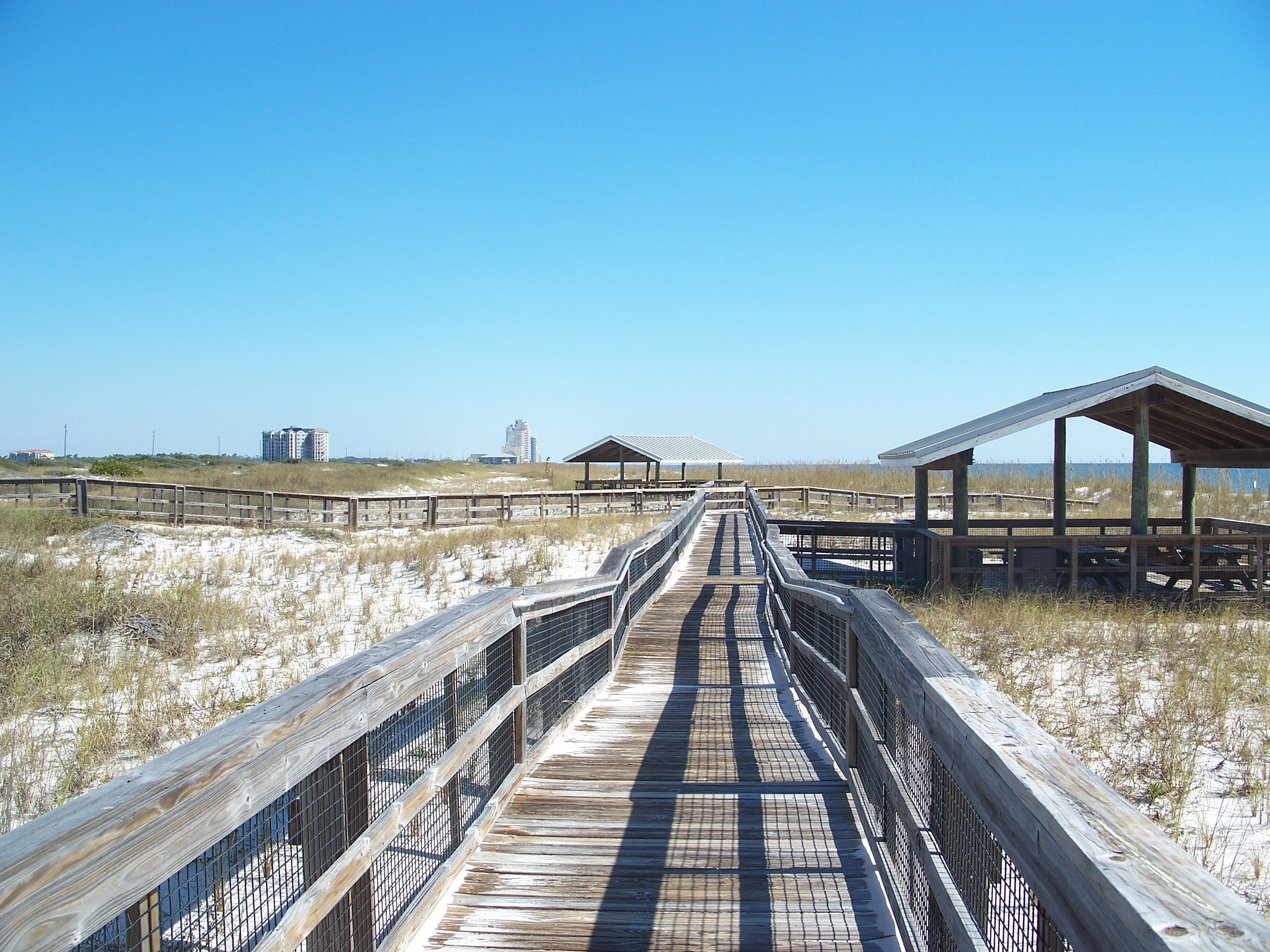
Boardwalk and pavilion

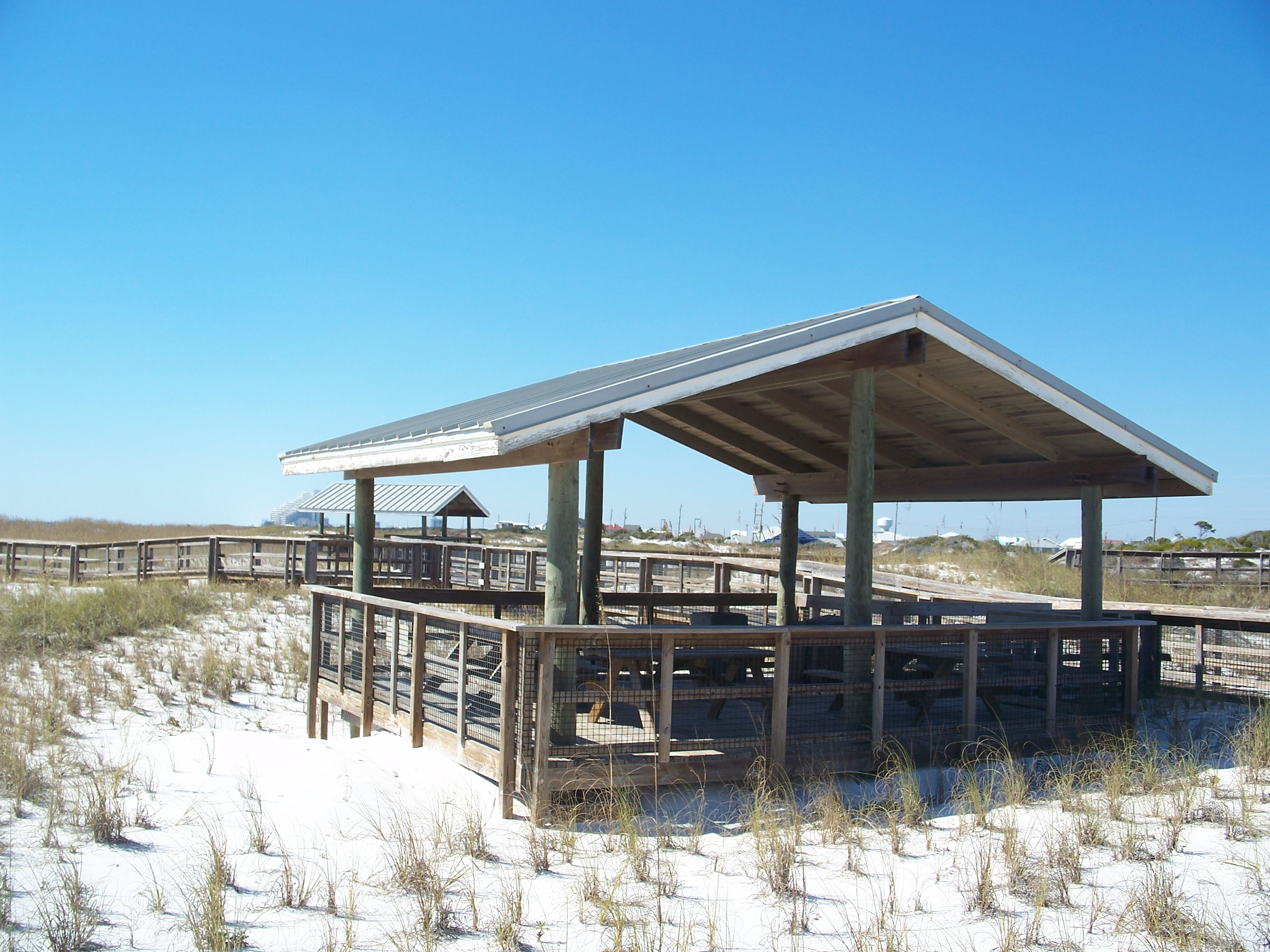
Pavilion

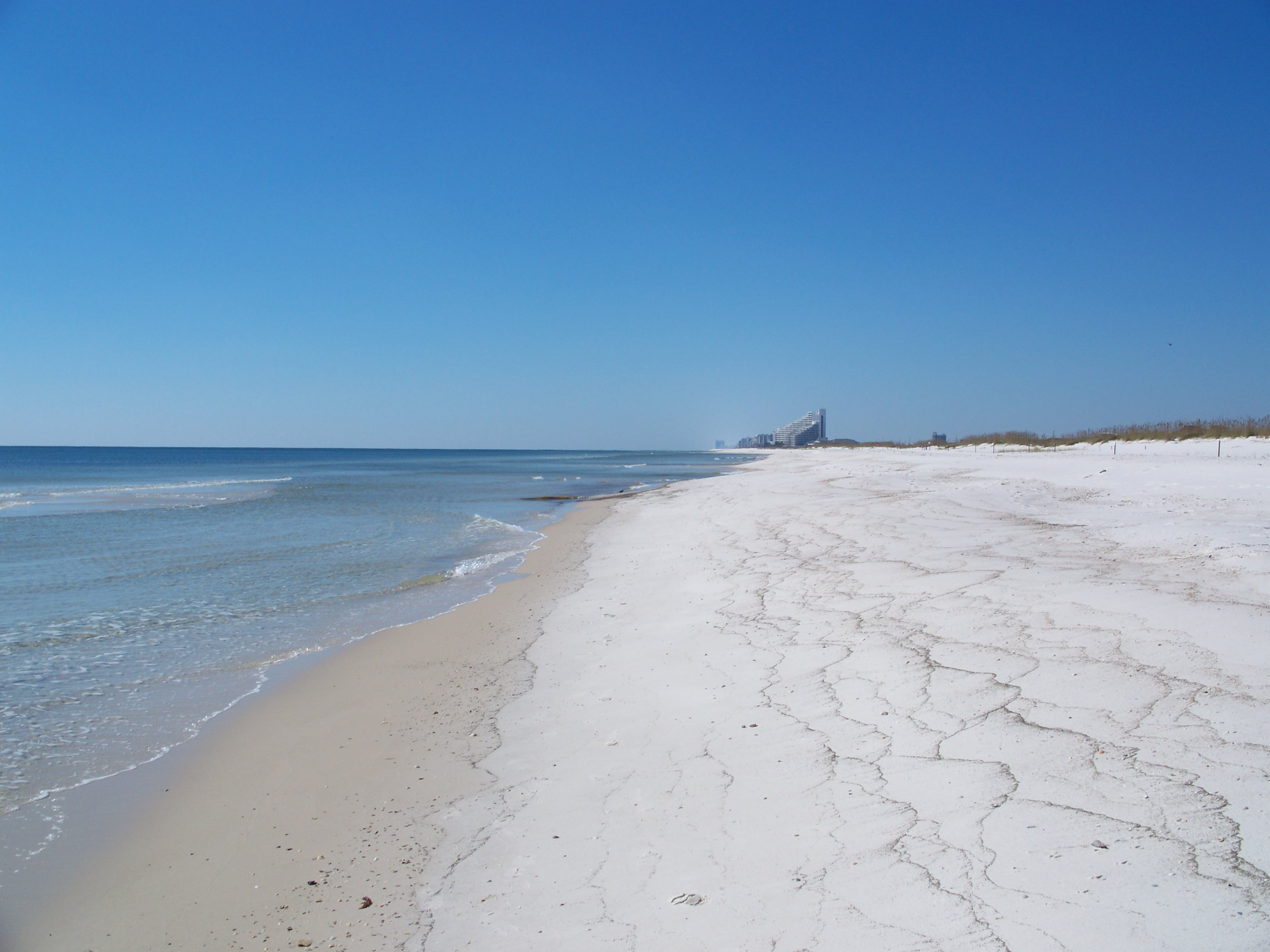
Beach, looking west

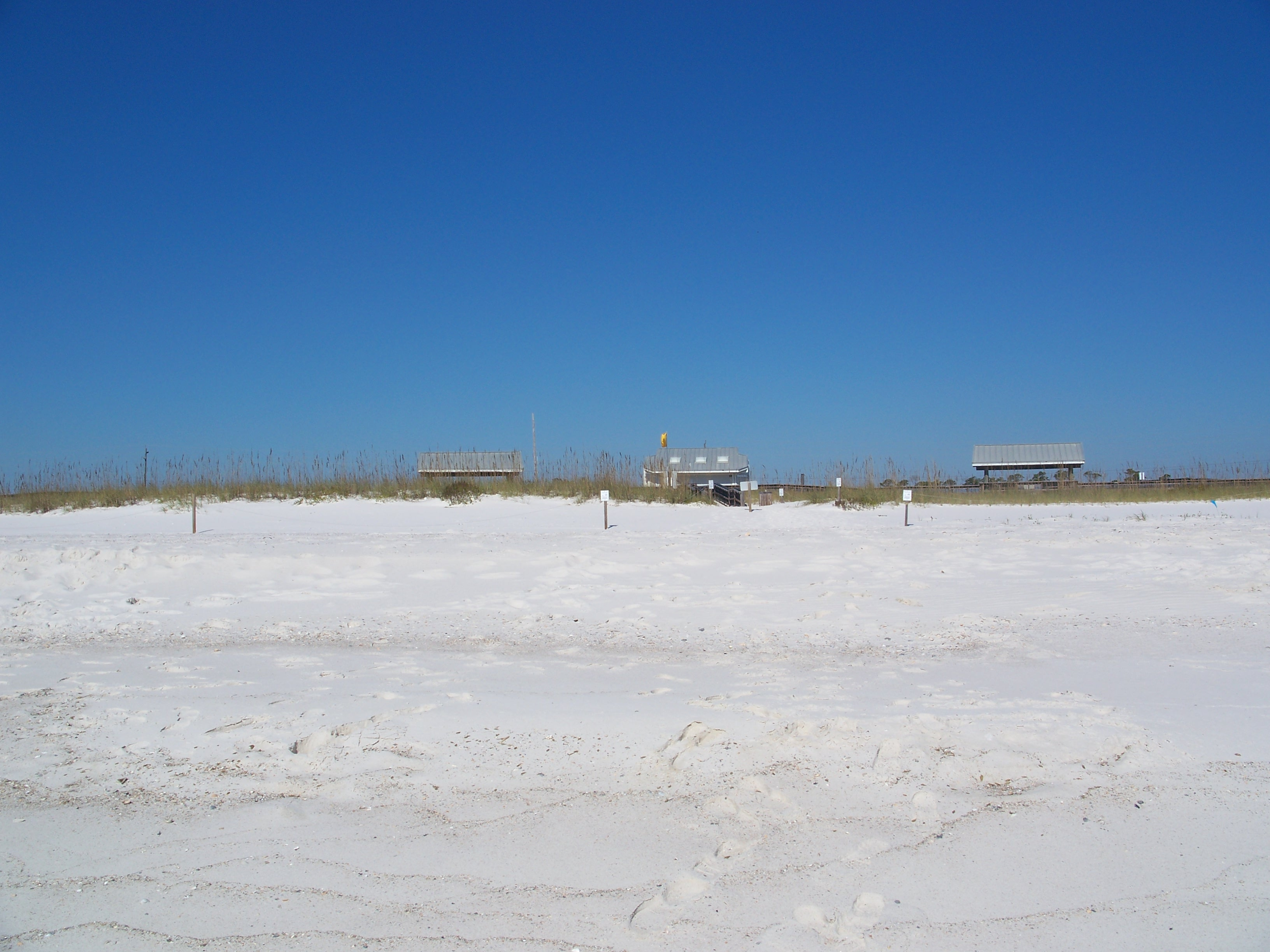
Beach, looking north
