= Pensacola Bay =

Bay in the panhandle of Florida, USA

Coordinates: 30°22′06″N 87°12′03″W

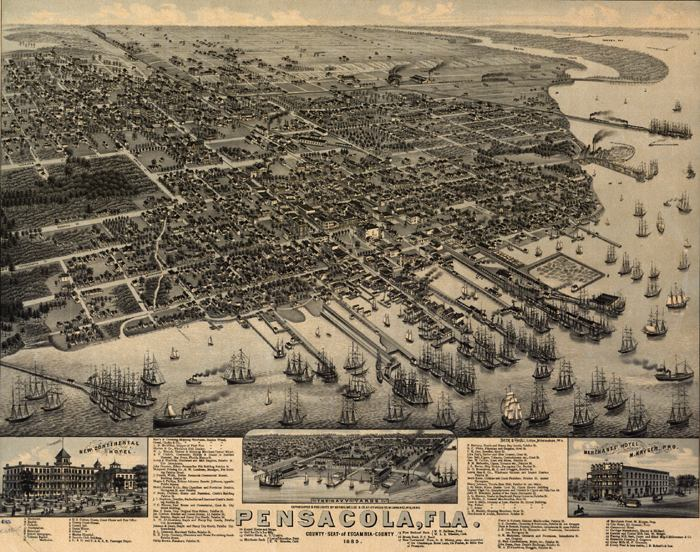
Pensacola and Pensacola Bay, 1885 lithograph.

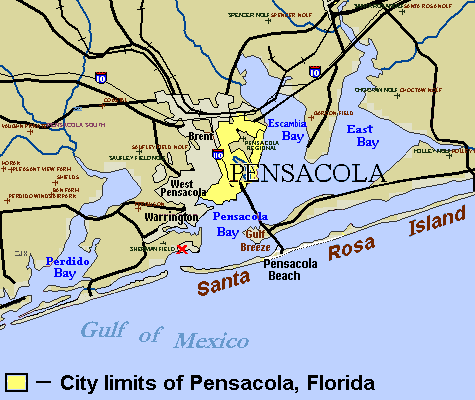
Pensacola Bay (map center) is southeast of Pensacola, Florida, by Escambia Bay.

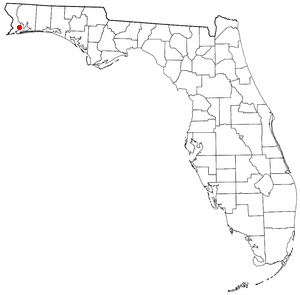
Location of Pensacola Bay (top left) in the state of Florida.

Pensacola Bay is a bay located in the northwestern part of Florida, United States, known as the Florida Panhandle.

The bay, an inlet of the Gulf of Mexico, is located in Escambia County and Santa Rosa County, adjacent to the city of Pensacola, Florida, and is about 13 miles (21 km) long and 2.5 miles (4 km) wide. The Pensacola Bay estuarine system, which also includes Escambia Bay, Blackwater Bay, East Bay, Santa Rosa Sound, and the Escambia, Blackwater, Yellow, and East Bay rivers, is 144 square miles, and it is the fourth largest estuarine system in Florida.

Pensacola Bay is formed and protected by Fairpoint Peninsula and the barrier island of Santa Rosa. The Pensacola Bay Bridge crosses the bay, connecting Pensacola to Gulf Breeze on the western end of the peninsula. The Gulf Islands National Seashore includes Santa Rosa Island, and encloses part of the bay. The Gulf Intracoastal Waterway runs through a section of the bay. Pensacola Bay is bordered by Escambia Bay and East Bay to the north, and Santa Rosa Sound to the east. Pensacola Pass connects the Bay to the Gulf of Mexico.

== History ==
After the War of 1812, the federal government decided to fortify Pensacola and Pensacola Bay. It built the Navy Yard west of the city in Warrington, starting in 1828 (this was redeveloped in the 20th century as Naval Air Station Pensacola). It completed construction of Fort Pickens in 1834 at the western end of Santa Rosa Island; completed Fort McRee in 1839, and completed redesign and expansion of Fort Barrancas in 1844, to add to defenses.

== 2010 Gulf oil spill ==
Following the Deepwater Horizon oil spill (called the "Gulf oil spill"), the government and BP planned to close the entrance to Pensacola Pass with a floating barrier system in June 2010, to control tidal flow of oil entering from the Gulf of Mexico. The daily high tide was causing oil-contaminated water to enter Pensacola Bay. Such a barrier system is designed to allow boats to travel through Pensacola Pass during the outflowing tide, but to close during the rising tide.

The booming plan was never carried out. The Pass was only boomed for a day due to strong currents which broke the boom. No other plan was in place in areas of less current nor was there a plan to trap incoming oil. Oil product entered the pass.

== See also ==
- Pensacola, Florida
- History of Pensacola, Florida
