= Benjamin Lewis Hodge =

Louisiana politician and Army colonel (1824–1864)

Member of the C.S. House of Representatives from Louisiana's 5th district
- In office May 2, 1864 – August 12, 1864
- Preceded by: Henry Marshall
- Succeeded by: Henry Gray

Personal details
- Born: c. 1824 Tennessee, United States
- Died: August 12, 1864 (aged 39–40) near Shreveport, Louisiana
- Party: Whig; Know Nothing (1855); Constitutional Union (1860)
- Profession: Lawyer

Military service
- Allegiance: Confederate States of America
- Branch/service: Confederate States Army
- Years of service: 1861–1862
- Rank: Colonel
- Commands: 19th Louisiana Infantry Regiment
- Battles/wars: Battle of Shiloh

Benjamin Lewis Hodge (c. 1824 – August 12, 1864) was a Confederate politician who commanded the 19th Louisiana Infantry Regiment during the early stages of the American Civil War, including during the Battle of Shiloh.

Hodge was born in Tennessee and later moved to Shreveport, Louisiana, becoming a wealthy lawyer and prominent local politician. Elected colonel of the new 19th Louisiana in late 1861, Hodge resigned from the army after Shiloh due to ill health. Returning to politics, he won an unopposed election for a seat in the Confederate House of Representatives and briefly served in the Second Confederate Congress before his death in 1864.

== Antebellum period ==
Hodge was born in Tennessee c. 1824, according to census data. Little is known of his early life and education. By the 1850 census, he had become a lawyer and moved to Caddo Parish, Louisiana. At that time, he owned real estate valued at $1,000. Hodge achieved local prominence and served several terms in the state legislature. He was elected to the state senate in 1852 as a Whig from the district including Caddo, DeSoto, and Sabine Parishes. In 1855, Hodge was one of the organizers of the American Party (known as the Know Nothings) in Shreveport. He won election as a Know Nothing state representative from Caddo Parish in 1857. By the 1860 census, his assets had grown to a value of over $100,000, including four slaves, making him one of the wealthiest men in north Louisiana at the time and one of the most successful lawyers in the state. He was the owner of shops and the largest residence in Shreveport, and was invested in land and slaves, having married Caledonia Cash, the adopted daughter of a leading local planter, in 1852. Two Mississippi and Red River steamboats, the B. L. Hodge and B. L. Hodge No. 2, built in 1857 and 1867, respectively, were named after him.

== Secession and Civil War ==
As a former Whig who had become a Know Nothing, Hodge prioritized the preservation of the Union over states' rights, in opposition to Southern Democrats. In the 1860 election, he became a prominent supporter of moderate Constitutional Union Party, serving as an elector for it. Traveling to Washington, Hodge addressed Constitutional Unionists there in early August, denouncing secessionists as corrupt office-seekers and affirming the party ticket as the sole alternative to Republican Party. In the months leading up to the election he campaigned for the Constitutional Unionists in north Louisiana. Motivated by economic interests, a majority of Shreveport voters went for the Constitutional Union ticket in November. Planters in the rest of Caddo Parish carried it for the Southern Democrats, who gained a plurality of the state vote over the Constitutional Unionists.

After Republican Abraham Lincoln was elected president, Hodge became a proponent of immediate disunion, standing for election to the state secession convention for the senatorial district of Caddo, DeSoto, Natchitoches, and Sabine Parishes. Hodge and DeSoto Parish planter and state senator Henry Marshall significantly outpolled their cooperationist opponents who favored delaying secession, and signed the state secession ordinance after it was pushed through by those advocating immediate secession on January 26, 1861. Hodge soon stood for election as a delegate to the Montgomery Constitutional Convention that became the Provisional Congress, but lost to Marshall by eight votes.

Hodge joined the army on April 20, becoming third lieutenant of the Shreveport Grays infantry company, which was slated to join the 1st Louisiana Regulars but instead went to Lieutenant Colonel Charles Didier Dreux's 1st Louisiana Battalion, where it was designated Company D. He brought James Lewis, a free colored man, into service with him. After serving at Pensacola, Hodge and his unit were transferred to Virginia, one of the first Louisiana units to reach the state. The battalion served on picket duty in the Virginia Peninsula and on July 2 Hodge resigned his commission, returning to Louisiana with Lewis. A request by Major General Leonidas Polk to appoint Hodge as judge advocate general in his command was denied. Hodge unsuccessfully ran for a seat in the Confederate Senate in November and at Shreveport became captain of the Keachi Warriors. The latter became Company I of the 19th Louisiana Infantry Regiment, and Hodge was elected colonel of the regiment when it was organized on November 11.

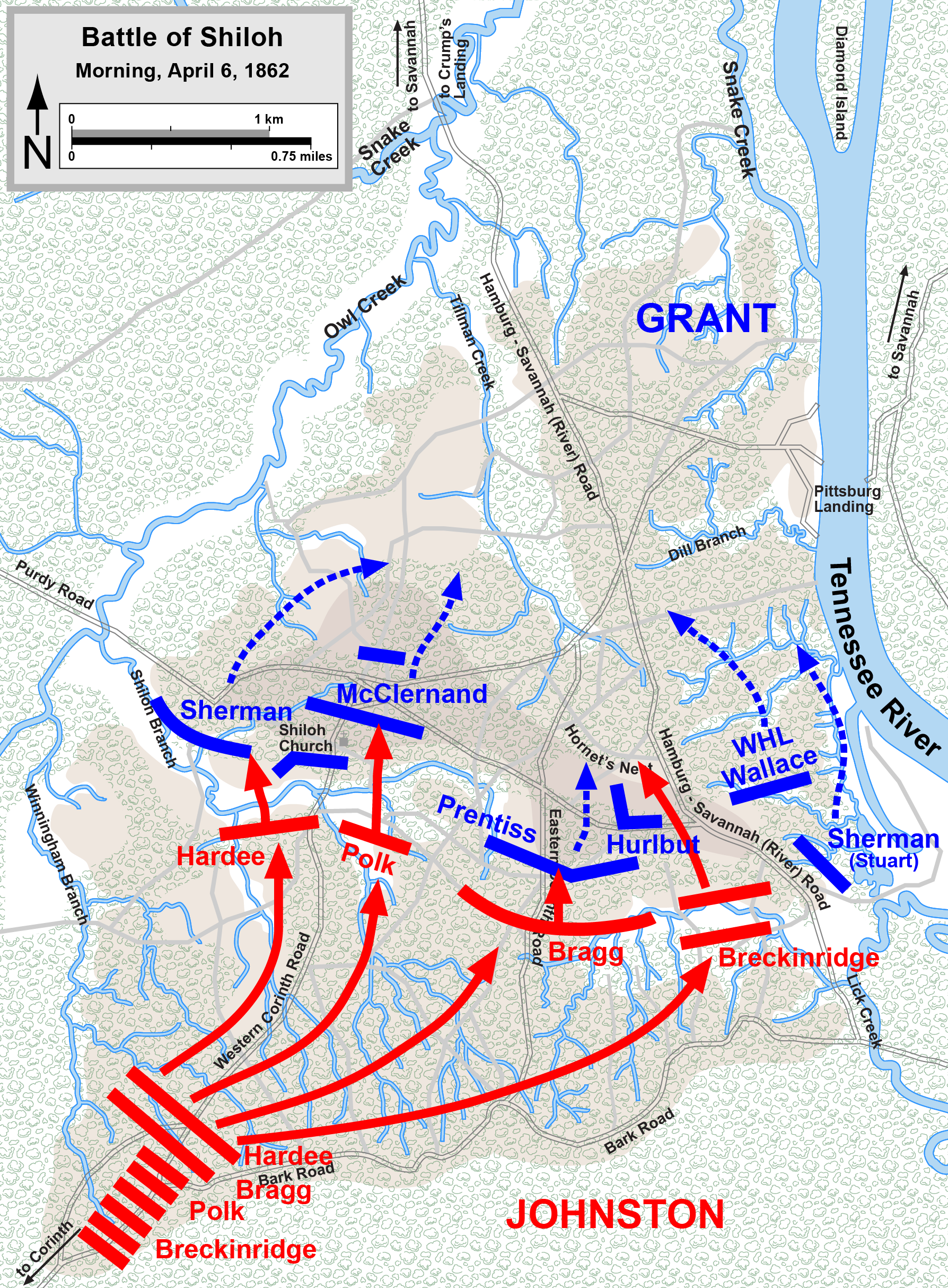
With Bragg's corps, Gibson's brigade was involved in the attack on Prentiss' division

Hodge led the regiment in the 1862 Battle of Shiloh as part of Colonel Randall L. Gibson's brigade. About noon on the first day of the battle, April 6, the 19th Louisiana advanced into the Davis' wheat field against the Union center, and were struck by Union fire after reaching the log cabin in the middle of the field, their opponents obscured by the brush. Hodge advanced his men to seek shelter behind a fence on the north side of the field. In the brigade advance on Union positions that became known as the Hornet's Nest, he ordered a bayonet charge, which failed with the loss of a sixth of the regiment to fire from three Union regiments and their artillery. Gibson's brigade failed to break the Union line in several frontal assaults, with Hodge writing in his post-battle report that "it would have been madness to have kept my command there longer." Exhausted, the brigade was sent to the rear by corps commander Major General Braxton Bragg. Hodge advocated for bringing up artillery and flanking the Union line at the Hornet's Nest. Bragg ignored this suggestion, but Hodge was vindicated by the surrender of the Hornet's Nest defenders hours later when the Confederates employed massed artillery and flank attacks.

That night, Hodge camped his regiment to the right of Brigadier General Patton Anderson's brigade, separating it from the rest of Gibson's brigade. On the morning of April 7, Hodge attempted to rejoin Gibson's brigade but Brigadier General Jones Withers ordered him to turn over command of the 19th Louisiana to its lieutenant colonel and put him in command of an improvised brigade consisting of his regiment, the 25th Alabama and Crescent Regiments, and the 5th Company of the Washington Artillery. His ad hoc formation was positioned on the right of the army in support of Brigadier General James R. Chalmers' brigade in Davis' field. The guns of the Washington Artillery were temporarily overrun by Colonel William B. Hazen's brigade around 11:00, and the Louisianans charged forward to retake them, routing the Union troops. In the latter, Hodge was stunned by being thrown from his horse and had to be carried off the field.

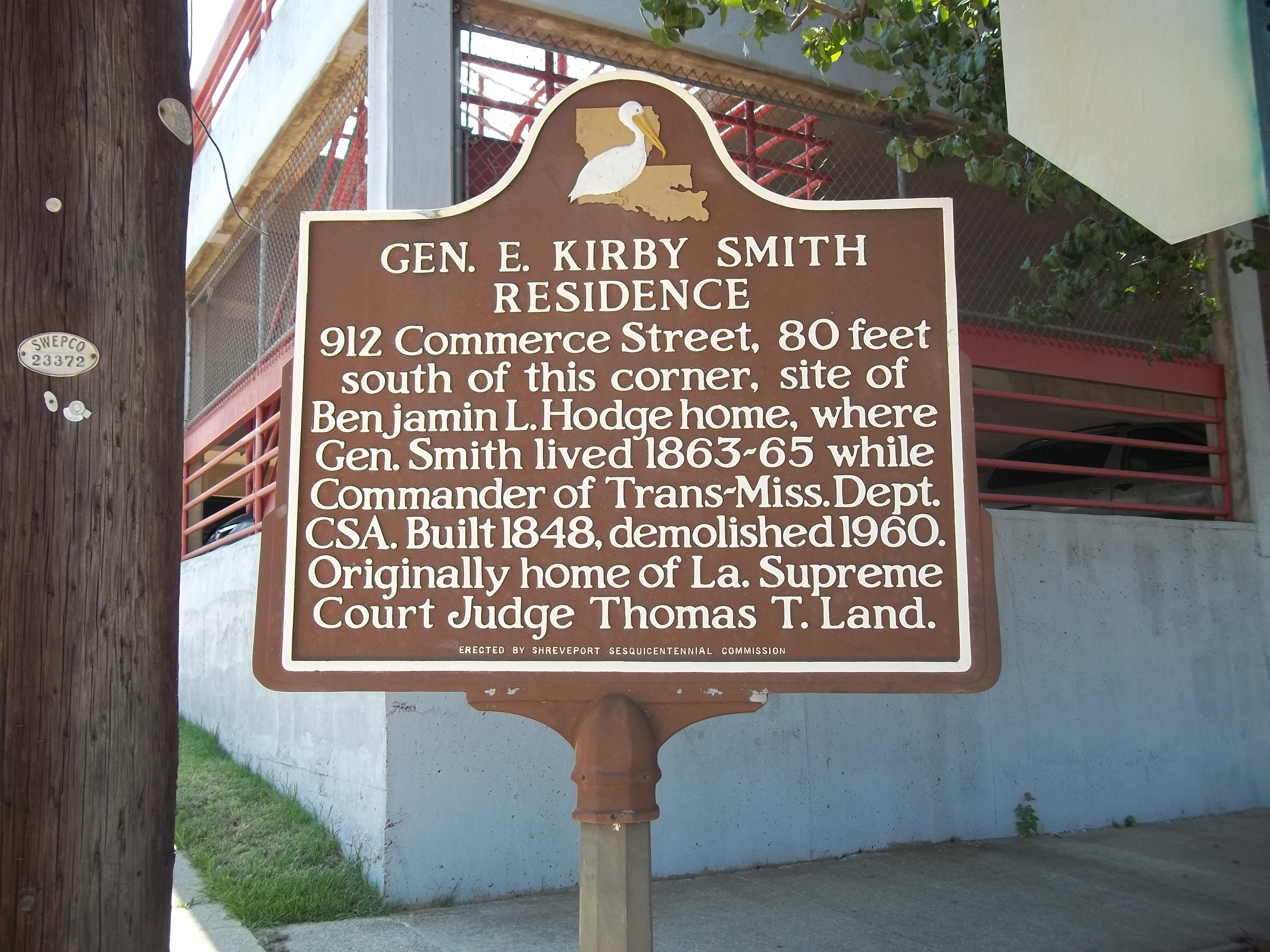
Hodge residence plaque

Hodge resigned his commission on May 29, due to health problems, after a long period on sick leave, returning to Shreveport. His resignation was not accepted until July 15. In the election of November 1863 he won a seat representing the 5th district in the Confederate House of Representatives after running unopposed, replacing the anti-administration Marshall, who declined to run for re-election. On February 19, 1864, he was appointed presiding judge of the military court of the Trans-Mississippi Department, a position that carried the rank of colonel with it. Due to travel time, Hodge was not admitted to the first session of the Second Confederate Congress until May 25. He proposed no bills and rarely voted, advocating for higher taxes and protectionism. The session ended on June 14 and Hodge returned to Louisiana. His health continued to decline and he died near Shreveport, likely at the mansion of his wife's stepfather, on August 12. His seat was filled by Henry Gray in a special election. Hodge, described by a contemporary newspaper as "well known as one of the most brilliant men in North Louisiana," was buried in an unmarked grave in Shreveport's Oakland Cemetery. Hodge and his wife had three sons, Benjamin Lewis, A.G., and Thomas Green, the last of which died in 1956 at the age of 92.

Hodge loaned his residence to department commander Lieutenant General Edmund Kirby Smith when the Trans-Mississippi Department was headquartered in Shreveport. A plaque was dedicated to Hodges at the Oakland Cemetery in 1979.

== Bibliography ==
- Allardice, Bruce S. (2008). Confederate Colonels: A Biographical Register. Columbia: University of Missouri Press. ISBN 978-0-8262-1809-4.
- Beard, W.E. (June 1915). "The Confederate Government, 1861–1865". Tennessee Historical Magazine. 1 (2): 120–128. JSTOR 42637985.
- Bergeron, Arthur W. (1996). Guide to Louisiana Confederate Military Units, 1861–1865. Baton Rouge: Louisiana State University Press. ISBN 0-8071-2102-9.
- Booth, Andrew B. (Compiler) (1920). Records of Louisiana Confederate Soldiers and Louisiana Confederate Commands. Vol. III (Book 1). New Orleans. OCLC 3548067.
- Christian, Marcus Bruce. "The Negro as a Soldier 1861–1865". The History of The Negro in Louisiana. – Unpublished manuscript in University of New Orleans collections
- Dew, Charles B. (Autumn 1969). "The Long Lost Returns: The Candidates and Their Totals in Louisiana's Secession Election". Louisiana History: The Journal of the Louisiana Historical Association. 10 (4): 353–369. JSTOR 4231094.
- Jewell, Edwin L. (1873). Jewell's Crescent City Illustrated. New Orleans. OCLC 166586136.
- Sacher, John M. (2003). A Perfect War of Politics: Parties, Politicians, and Democracy in Louisiana, 1824-1861. Baton Rouge: Louisiana State University Press. ISBN 0-8071-2848-1.
- Salling, Stuart (2010). Louisianians in the Western Confederacy: The Adams-Gibson Brigade in the Civil War. Jefferson, North Carolina: McFarland. ISBN 978-0-7864-4218-8.
- Smith, Timothy B. (2014). Shiloh: Conquer or Perish. Lawrence: University Press of Kansas. ISBN 978-0-7006-1995-5.
- Snyder, Perry A. (Spring 1972). "Shreveport, Louisiana: 1861-1865: From Secession to Surrender". Louisiana Studies. Northwestern State University: 50–70. ISSN 0024-693X.
- Survey of Federal Archives (1942). Ship Registers and Enrollments of New Orleans, Louisiana: 1861-1870. Baton Rouge: Louisiana State University. OCLC 3796878.
- Warner, Ezra J.; Yearns, W. Buck (1975). Biographical Register of the Confederate Congress. Baton Rouge: Louisiana State University Press. ISBN 0-8071-0092-7.
