= 19th Louisiana Infantry Regiment =

Infantry regiment of the Confederate States Army

- Active: 19 November 1861–April 1865
- Country: Confederate States of America
- Allegiance: Louisiana
- Branch: Confederate States Army
- Type: Infantry
- Size: Regiment (873 men, Dec. 1861)
- Part of: Adams'/Gibson's Brigade (from March 1862)
- Engagements: Battle of Shiloh; Siege of Jackson; Battle of Chickamauga; Battle of Missionary Ridge; Battle of Rocky Face Ridge; Battle of Resaca; Battle of New Hope Church; Battle of Atlanta; Battle of Ezra Church; Battle of Jonesboro; Battle of Franklin; Battle of Nashville; Battle of Spanish Fort

Commanders
- Notable commanders: Benjamin Lewis Hodge

The 19th Louisiana Infantry Regiment was an infantry regiment from Louisiana that served in the Confederate States Army during the American Civil War.

== History ==
=== Formation ===
The future companies of the 19th Louisiana arrived at Camp Moore, established near Tangipahoa in May 1861 to provide an assembly point for Louisiana volunteer companies joining the Confederate army, in the late summer and early fall of 1861. There, they waited for assignment to a regiment, which came when the 19th Louisiana was organized on 19 November 1861. The 19th was initially understrength, having only eight of its required ten companies; the remaining two joined on 11 December to bring it to a strength of 873 men. The ten companies, hailing from north Louisiana, were as follows:

Company	Nickname	Recruitment Area (Parish)
A	Vance Guards	Bossier
B	Robins Greys	Bossier
C	Claiborne Volunteers	Claiborne
D	Claiborne Greys	Claiborne
E	Stars of Equality	Union
F	Henry Marshall Guards	DeSoto
G	Caddo 10th	Caddo
H	DeSoto Creoles	DeSoto
I	Keachi Warriors	Caddo
K	Anacoco Rangers	Sabine and Rapides

Caddo Parish lawyer Benjamin Lewis Hodge of the Keachi Warriors was elected colonel, De Soto Parish planter James M. Hollingsworth of the Henry Marshall Guards lieutenant colonel, and Shreveport lawyer Wesley Winans of the Caddo 10th major. Hollingsworth, a graduate of the Western Military Institute, was the only one of the three with military training. Ten members of the regiment died of disease at Camp Moore, where the north Louisianans were exposed to illnesses that they had not been exposed to before. After organizing, the regiment was moved between 11 and 16 December via the New Orleans and Great Northern Railway to Camp Roman, several miles west of New Orleans, and thence to the newly established Camp Benjamin, located near Camp Roman, between 1 and 3 January 1862. The regiment moved to Corinth, Mississippi in February 1862. The 19th Louisiana fought in the Battle of Shiloh between 6 and 7 April, losing roughly a fifth of its total strength. It remained in the trenches at Corinth to guard the brigade camps and supplies during the 9 May Battle of Farmington. From July, it served as part of the garrison of Mobile, Alabama, encamped at Pollard east of the city.

The 19th Louisiana was ordered to report to the Army of Tennessee at Tullahoma, Tennessee in April 1863, where it joined the Louisiana brigade of Daniel W. Adams. With the brigade, it moved to Jackson, Mississippi in May to join General Joseph E. Johnston's army. The brigade fought in the Siege of Jackson between 5 and 25 July, with the 19th repulsing an attack on its trenches on 12 July.

Returning to the Army of Tennessee in north Georgia, the regiment and its brigade fought in the Battle of Chickamauga between 19 and 20 September. Company F of the regiment captured two Union cannons during the battle, but the regiment lost 153 out of the 350 officers and men engaged. In the Battle of Missionary Ridge on 25 November, the 19th repulsed several attacks but was forced to retreat when outflanked by the Union advance. It spent the winter of 1863 to 1864 encamped near Dalton, Georgia with the army.

During the Atlanta campaign, the regiment fought at the battles of Mill Creek Gap (8–11 May), Resaca (14–15 May), New Hope Church (25–28 May), Atlanta (22 July), Ezra Church (28 July), and Jonesboro (31 August). It moved into Tennessee with the army and on 30 November arrived too late to fight at the Battle of Franklin. Heavily engaged at the Battle of Nashville between 15 and 16 November, the regiment retreated with the army from Nashville to Tupelo, Mississippi. The 19th spent several months there before going to Mobile with the brigade, where it fought in the Siege of Spanish Fort between 27 March and 8 April 1865. At the beginning of the siege, the regiment mustered 152 men. After the evacuation of Mobile, the 19th Louisiana was consolidated with other Louisiana units to form the Pelican Regiment. Companies A, E, and I of the 19th became Company A of the new unit, while C, F, G, and K became D, and B, D, and H became E. This proved brief, as on 8 May the regiment surrendered at Gainesville, Alabama.

== See also ==
- List of Louisiana Confederate Civil War units
- Louisiana in the Civil War
