= Cooperationists =

The Cooperationists were a group formed in the United States in the 1860s after the Election of 1860. After South Carolina's secession from the Union, the Cooperationists believed that the remaining slave states should secede at once and at the same time, rather than one at a time, to impress the federal government with seriousness of the states' resolve. The proposal was rejected, but the South seceded in rapid succession. The following is a list of the states that seceded, including the date on which each state seceded:

- South Carolina (December 20, 1860)
- Mississippi (January 9, 1861)
- Florida (January 10, 1861)
- Alabama (January 11, 1861)
- Georgia (January 19, 1861)
- Louisiana (January 26, 1861)
- Texas (February 1, 1861)
- Virginia (April 17, 1861)
- Arkansas (May 6, 1861)
- North Carolina (May 20, 1861)
- Tennessee (June 8, 1861)
