= 1st Louisiana Infantry Battalion =

Infantry battalion of the Confederate States Army

1st Louisiana Infantry Battalion (Dreux's/Rightor's)
- Flag of Louisiana, 1861
- Active: 11 June 1861 – 1 May 1862
- Country: Confederate States of America
- Allegiance: Louisiana
- Branch: Confederate States Army
- Type: Infantry
- Size: 545 (total enrollment)
- Engagements: American Civil War: Skirmish at Smith's Farm; Peninsula Campaign

Commanders
- Notable commanders: Charles Didier Dreux

The 1st Louisiana Infantry Battalion, officially known as the 1st Battalion, Louisiana Volunteers and often referred to as the Dreux-Rightor Battalion to distinguish it from units with similar designations, was an infantry battalion from Louisiana that served in the Confederate States Army during the American Civil War.

== History ==
The five original companies of the battalion, the first volunteer companies to respond to the state's call for volunteers to serve in the Confederate army, were sent to Pensacola, Florida in mid-April 1861 to bring the 1st Louisiana Regulars, who had not finished their organization, up to strength. The New Orleans companies included some of the city's most prominent gentlemen. After the remainder of the 1st Louisiana Regulars companies arrived at Pensacola in late May, the five companies that became those of the battalion were sent to Virginia, where they arrived on 30 May. The companies were organized as the 1st Louisiana Infantry Battalion at Richmond on 11 June, with Orleans Cadets captain Charles Didier Dreux elected lieutenant colonel. The five companies were designated as follows:

Company	Local Designation	Recruitment Area (Parish)
A	Louisiana Guards	Orleans
B	Crescent Rifles, Company A	Orleans
D	Shreveport Greys	Caddo
E	Grivot Guards	Terrebonne
F	Orleans Cadets	Orleans

The battalion was soon sent to join the Yorktown garrison. On 5 July, Dreux led a detachment composed of twenty picked men from each company to ambush Union soldiers near Newport News. In the resulting Skirmish at Smith's Farm, he and another man were killed, making Dreux the first Louisiana officer, and likely the first Confederate field officer killed in the war. After Dreux's death, Major Nicholas H. Rightor succeeded to command and became lieutenant colonel. On 16 July, the battalion was increased to six companies by the transfer of Company C of the Louisiana Guards, who became Company C of the battalion, from the 1st Louisiana Infantry Regiment. The battalion remained on picket duty in the Virginia Peninsula until April 1862, when the Union Army of the Potomac launched the Peninsula campaign. The 1st Louisiana Battalion participated in a skirmish near the junction of the Warwick and Yorktown roads on 5 April. Except for Company D, the one-year terms of service of the companies of the battalion expired during the campaign, but they agreed to remain in service until the conclusion of the campaign. The 1st Battalion was disbanded on 1 May, just before the army retreated to Richmond after the Battle of Yorktown.

Most men of the battalion reenlisted in a battery formed by Captain Charles E. Fenner of Company A. Company D was assigned to the 1st Louisiana Infantry Regiment. During its service, a total of 545 men served in the battalion. Besides Dreux and the other man killed on 5 July 1861, sixteen members of the battalion died of disease.
