= Confederate States Congress =

Bicameral legislature of the Confederate States of America

Coordinates: 37°32′20″N 77°26′01″W

- Seal of the Confederate States

Type
- Type: Bicameral
- Houses: Senate; House of Representatives

History
- Founded: February 18, 1862
- Disbanded: March 18, 1865 (de facto)
- Preceded by: Provisional Congress of the Confederate States

Leadership
- President of the Senate: Alexander H. Stephens
- President pro tempore: Robert M. T. Hunter
- President pro tempore ad interim: William Graham
- Speaker of the House: Thomas S. Bocock
- Speaker pro tempore: William Parish Chilton
- Seats: 135; 26 Senators; 109 Representatives

Meeting place
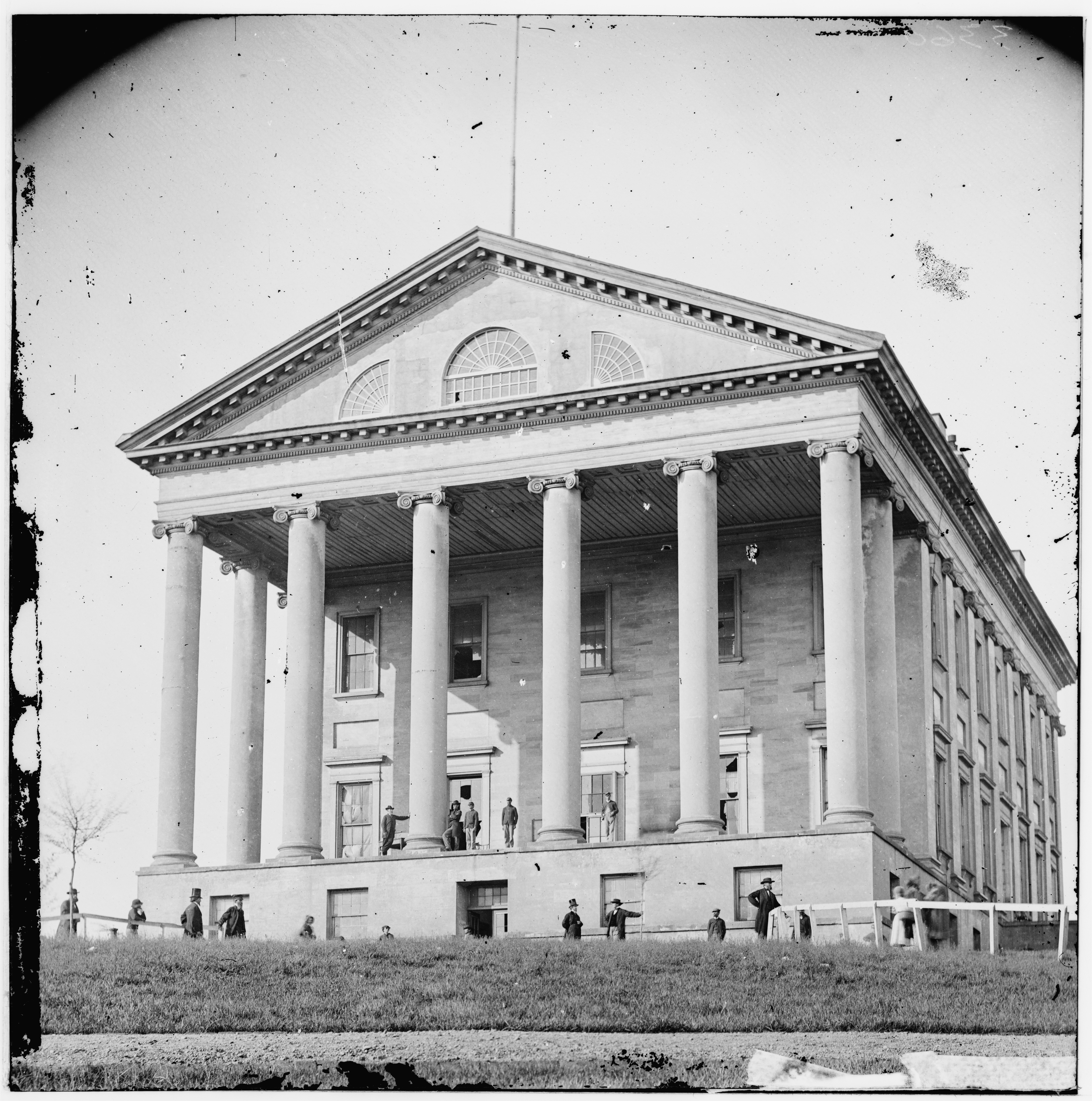
- Virginia State Capitol; Richmond, Virginia; Confederate States of America

Constitution
- Constitution of the Confederate States

The Confederate States Congress was both the provisional and permanent legislative assembly of the Confederate States of America that existed from February 1861 to April/June 1865, during the American Civil War. Its actions were, for the most part, concerned with measures to establish a new national government for the Southern proto-state in the current Southern United States region, and to prosecute a war that had to be sustained throughout the existence of the Confederacy. At first, it met as a provisional congress both in the first capital city of Montgomery, Alabama, and the second in Richmond, Virginia. As was the case for the provisional Congress after it moved northeast to Richmond, the permanent Congress met in the existing Virginia State Capitol, a building which it also shared with the secessionist Virginia General Assembly (state legislature).

The precursor to the permanent Congressional legislature was the temporary Provisional Congress of the Confederate States, which helped establish the Confederacy as a nation state with an organized government. Following elections held in individual states, refugee colonies, and army camps in November 1861, the 1st Confederate States Congress met in four sessions. The 1863 midterm elections led to many former Democrats losing to former Whigs, the political parties of the recent 1850s in the United States in which they had formerly participated. The 2nd Confederate Congress met in two sessions following an intersession during the military campaign season beginning November 7, 1864, and ending on March 18, 1865, shortly before the conclusion of the Civil War and the downfall of the Confederacy.

All legislative considerations of the Confederate Congress were secondary to winning the American Civil War. These included debates whether to pass President Jefferson Davis's war measures and deliberations on alternatives to administration proposals, both of which were often denounced as discordant, regardless of the outcome. Congress was often held in low regard regardless of what it did. Amidst early battlefield victories, few sacrifices were asked of those who resided in the Confederacy, and the Confederate Congress and Davis were in essential agreement.

During the second half of the war, the Davis administration's program became more demanding, and the Confederate Congress responded by becoming more assertive in the law-making process even before the 1863 elections. It began to modify administration proposals, substitute its own measures, and sometimes it refused to act at all. While it initiated few major policies, it often concerned itself with details of executive administration. Despite its devotion to Confederate independence, it was criticized by supporters of Davis for occasional independence, and censured in the dissenting press for not asserting itself more often.

== Provisional Congress ==
The Confederate Congress first met provisionally on February 4, 1861, in Montgomery, Alabama, to form a unified national government among states whose secessionist conventions had resolved to leave their union with the United States. Most Deep South residents and many in the border states believed the new nation about to be born in a revolution to perpetuate slavery was the logical result of defeats in sectional contests.

=== Meeting at Montgomery ===
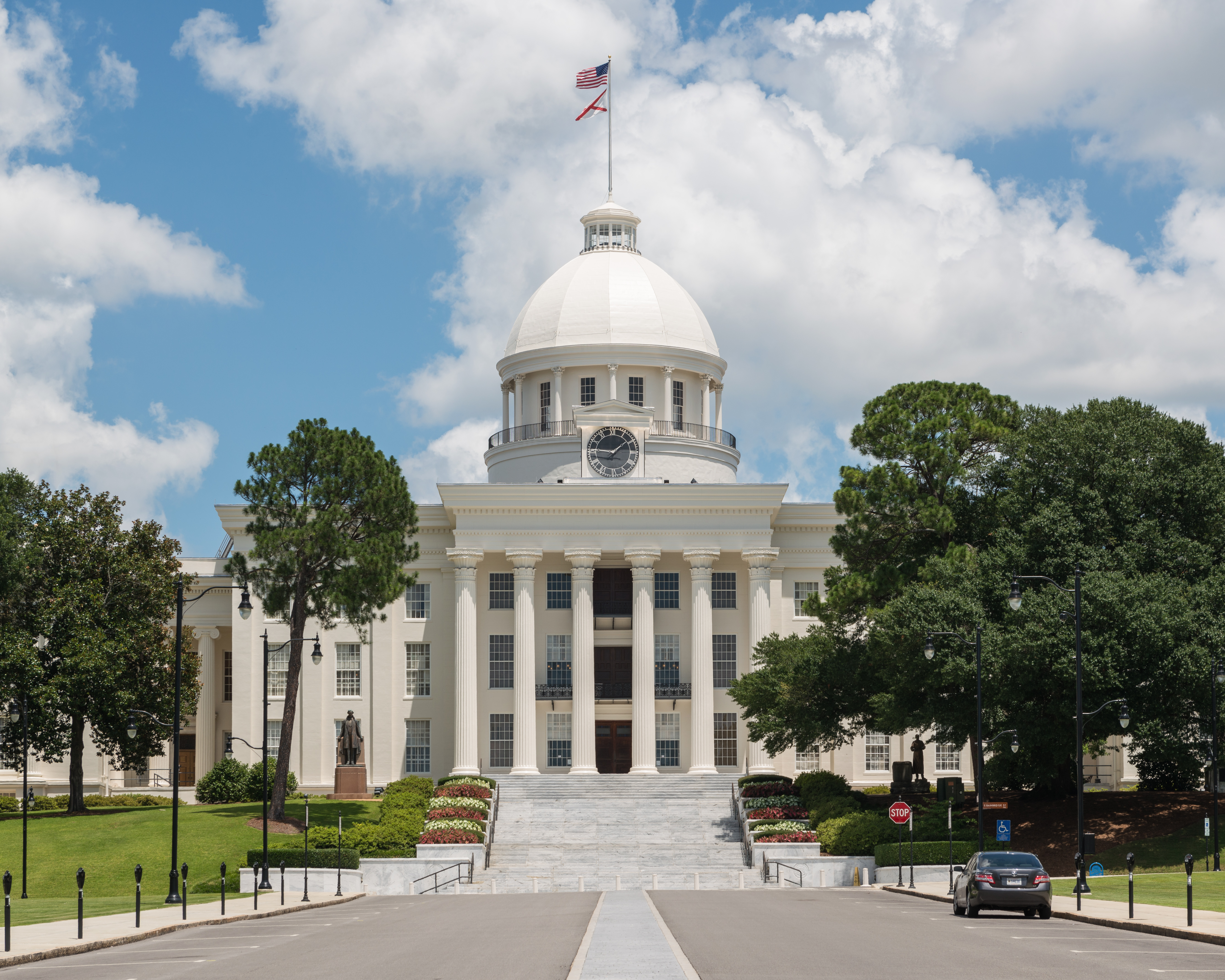
The Alabama State Capitol (built 1850–1851, of Greek Revival style architecture), at the state capital town of Montgomery, Alabama, where the delegates to the new provisional Confederate States Congress met here in early 1861, setting up a national government for the first seven seceded southern states, in the Confederate States of America. Also drawing up and adopting a provisional constitution and electing a president and vice president and organizing an Army. The beginnings of the American Civil War (1861–1865).

The 1859 raid at the federal Harpers Ferry Armory in Harper's Ferry, then in Virginia, at the confluence of the Shenandoah with the Potomac River, by abolitionist John Brown to free slaves in Virginia was hailed in the North by other abolitionists, who proclaimed that it was a noble martyrdom, while many in the South saw Brown as a provocateur and dangerous extremist, seeking to incite servile insurrection and violent social upheaval. The North seemed unwilling to accept the U.S. Supreme Court ruling in the Dredd Scott case of March 1857, that slaves were not free citizens even if moved to Northern free states or to the western federal territories, and by implication, therefore guaranteeing slavery in the territories, and the Democratic Party had split among Northern and Southern factions over the issue, especially in the controversial disputed 1860 presidential election. Sectional antagonism was magnified with the decline of the national Whig Party and the upsurge of the newly-organized Republican Party in 1854, was insistent on ending the extension of slavery in the western territories, which was seen as a threat to the very existence of continued slavery in the South itself, and of a white Southern civilization.

The increasing economic rivalry and gap of wealth between Northern industry and more mechanized farming versus Southern slave cash-crop agriculture seemed to be a losing battle that would permanently subject the South as diminished colonists dependent on an aggressive business world. Secession was to the state delegates meeting in Montgomery, Alabama, a clear cut solution to over several decades of humiliation, reverses, and defeats. A new nation of secessionist states exclusive to the South, would assure uncompromised slavery and deliver an independent economic security based on King Cotton.

The November 1860 election of Abraham Lincoln proved to be the deciding catalyst for the Deep South. Southern members of Congress repeatedly addressed their constituents, saying that all hope of sectional relief and redress was done and that "the sole and primary aim of each slaveholding State ought to be its speedy and absolute separation from an unnatural and hostile Union."

A chain reaction was set off, as the "secessionists", "straight-outs", and "States' rights men" demanded separate state action to withdraw from the United States and immediate regrouping as a Southern union for self defense. Cooperation towards such a new government was being achieved even before the Montgomery Convention, as the Southern states had been exchanging a series of commissioners to determine their joint action since the fall of 1860. On December 31, 1860, the South Carolina Convention issued an invitation to Southern states to form a Southern Confederacy, and, after their next commissioners returned on January 11, 1861, South Carolina invited all slave states in the Union to meet in Montgomery on February 4. Another six states called secession conventions of their own, held statewide elections to select delegates, convened and passed secession ordinances between January 9 and February 1, 1861.

South Carolina set the pattern for electing delegates to the Provisional Congress. Six state conventions elected two delegates at large, and one from each congressional district. Florida allowed its secessionist governor to appoint the state delegation. There was no popular election to the Provisional Congress; vacancies were filled by the secessionist conventions, state legislatures or temporarily by a convention president.

=== Membership and politics ===
Historian of the Confederate Congress, Wilfred Buck Yearns, held that the most significant feature of the Montgomery gathering was its moderation. The secessionist conventions had not only intended to establish a slaveholding republic of the Lower South, they also hoped to attract the border slaveholding states, and they sought to reconcile their own in-state cooperationists and union men. The result was that the Confederate Provisional Congress began its work in relative harmony.

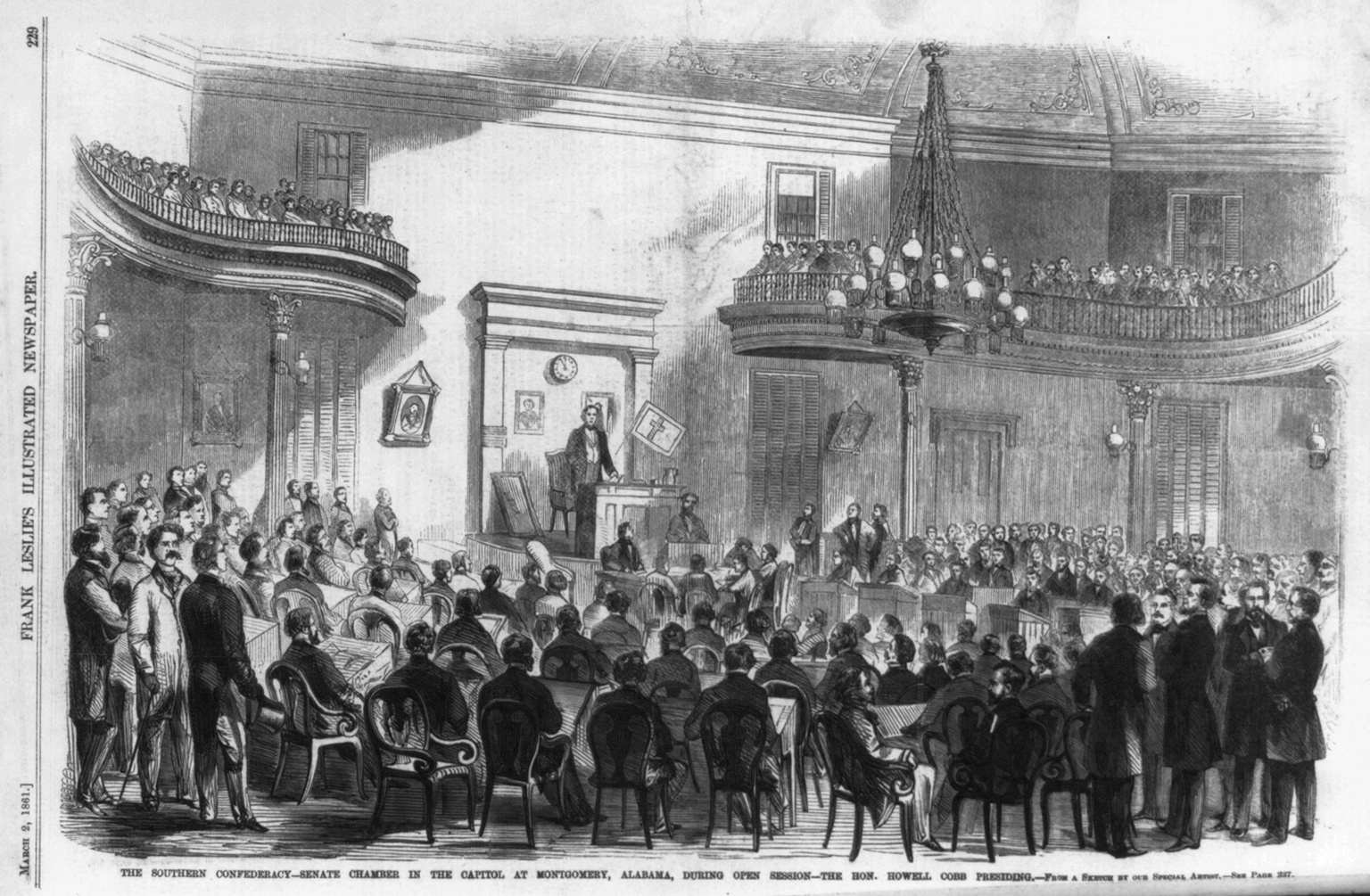
Meeting of the Provisional Confederate Congress, 1861

The state secessionist conventions had generally chosen delegates that truly represented their congressional districts, so the Provisional Congress fairly represented the diversity of the Southern states, excluding, of course, the millions of black people held in bondage throughout the South. Fifty delegates attended the first sessions at Montgomery. A majority of them had served in state secessionist conventions, and, overall in Congress, straight-out secessionists held a three-to-two ratio over the former conditional unionists. Alabama and Mississippi had the only state delegations with majority conditional unionists.

Most of the Provisional Congressional delegates were prominent men of major political parties. The majority of the former Democrats to former Whigs was narrow, with Alabama and Louisiana delegations majority Whig and Georgia evenly divided. Thirty-six members of Congress had attended college, forty-two were licensed lawyers, and seventeen were planters. Their average age was 47, ranging from 72 to 31. Thirty-four had previous legislative experience, twenty-four having served in the U.S. Congress. Charles Conrad had served as Secretary of War under President Millard Fillmore, and John Tyler had been the tenth U.S. president. As Yearns noted, "As a whole the Provisional Congress represented a higher type of leadership than either of the subsequent congresses."

During the Provisional Congress, the expected political rivalries between secessionist fire-eaters and conservative conditional unionists did not appear, nor did the older factions of former Democrats versus former Whigs. Past politics were reserved for short-hand labeling during election campaigns. The main basis for political division in the Confederate Congress were the issues related to the policies of the President and his administration. In the first year of the Provisional Congress, opposition stemmed from personal and philosophical differences with Jefferson Davis. Davis spoke in states' rights terms, but his actions were increasingly nationalist from early on, and he freely used his veto power against bills meant to limit national policy in a way that led to charges of "military despotism".

Some opposition came from personal dislike of Davis; other opponents believed the presidency rightfully belonged to Robert Rhett. Henry S. Foote and Davis had a long running dislike for each other, which had previously lead to physical fight on the floor of the U.S. Congress. Another representative, William Lowndes Yancey, resented Davis for distributing patronage jobs. Even friends of Davis's resented his habit of leaving Congress in total ignorance of executive policy and administration. He disliked personal interaction and met members only in state delegations. Generally speaking, Davis showed little interest in compromise, and Congressional legislators returned the favor by holding onto the opinions that got them elected.

Despite some resistance to the Davis administration proposals, because victory seemed imminent, little of the Confederacy was occupied, and any legislation that might require real sacrifice among the citizenry seemed unnecessary. Most Congressional debates were kept secret from the public, measures passed with substantial majorities, and the president's messages were encouraging.

=== Constitution drafting ===
Deputies from the first seven states convening in Montgomery, Alabama, resolved themselves into the Confederate Provisional Congress. Delegations from Alabama, Louisiana, Florida, Mississippi, Georgia, South Carolina, and Texas met in the Alabama State Capitol in two sessions from February through May 1861. A committee of twelve drafted a proposal from chairman Christopher G. Memminger from February 5–7. Receiving the committee report the following day, the convention of secession delegates assembled, with one vote cast for each state delegation, unanimously approved the Provisional Constitution of the Confederate States on February 8.

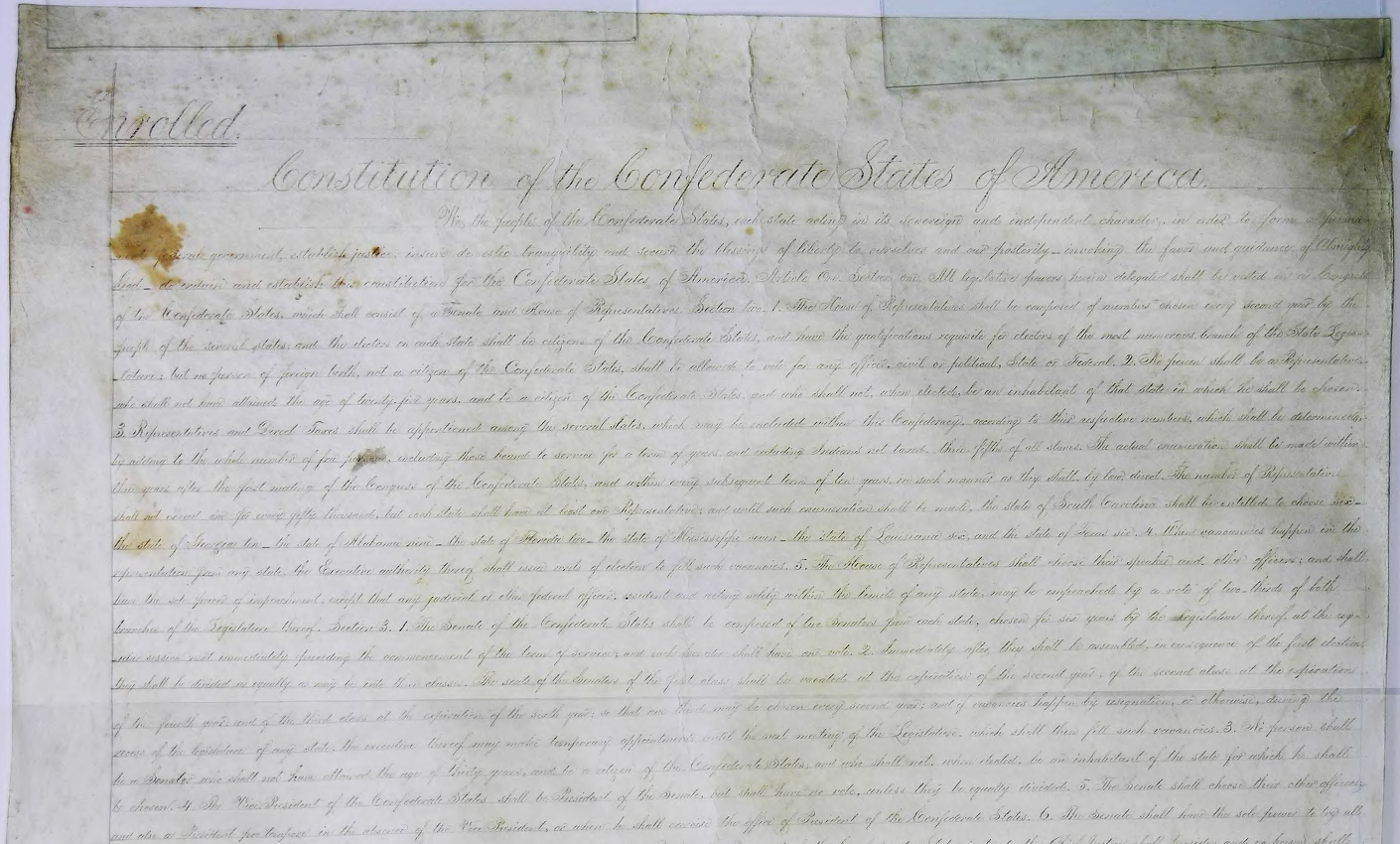
Preamble to the Confederate States Constitution

The Provisional Constitution was, as Alexander H. Stephens noted, "the Constitution of the United States with such changes as are necessary to meet the exigencies of the times." In a pointed effort to incorporate states' rights principles, the Provisional Confederate Constitution referred to the "Sovereign and Independent States" of the permanent union. The U.S. Constitution's "general welfare" was omitted. The Confederate Congress was to be similar to the Continental Congresses, with one chamber representing states, with a quorum of state delegations. Each state could fill Provisional Congressional vacancies as it wished.

Although not mandatory, the President might appoint cabinet members from Congress. In an effort at government economy, the president was authorized to veto individual items from appropriation bills. The Provisional Constitution organized each state into a federal judicial district – this provision was adopted in the permanent Confederate Constitution, but, in the only amendment to either document, this provision was amended to allow Congress to determine federal districts on May 21, 1861. A supreme court was to be constituted by convening all the federal district judges. To continue judicial procedure in the Confederacy as it had been in the United States, judicial power was extended to all cases of law and equity arising under the laws of the United States.

From February 28 until March 11, 1861, the Provisional Congress resolved itself into a Constitutional Convention each day, and, as a convention, it adopted the Permanent Confederate Constitution unanimously. On March 12, Howell Cobb of Georgia, as president of the Constitutional Convention, forwarded it to the state secessionist conventions. Several Congressmen returned to their home states to lobby for adoption, and all conventions ratified without submitting the new Constitution to a referendum by the people.

The permanent Constitution, like the provisional one before it, was primarily modeled on the U.S. Constitution, modified by the Convention's desire to write a Southern constitution. The national government was clearly to be only an agent of the states, powers to the central government were "delegated" not "granted". It provided for a bicameral national legislature consisting of a House of Representatives and a Senate. The rights and duties of Congress received the most attention, most importantly related to fiscal matters such as export duties, discouraging internal improvements but for navigational aids, and the self-sustaining post office.

To limit log-rolling, a two-thirds vote in each house was required for appropriations bills not recommended by an executive department, and the president had line-item-veto power. In Article III, radical states' righters struck the provisional Constitution's provision extending federal jurisdiction over cases between citizens of different states. Additionally, federal judicial power no longer applied to all cases of law and equity to accommodate the Roman law concept of single jurisdiction in Louisiana and Texas.

Congressional apportionment remained on the U.S. federal ratio, with three-fifths of the slave population counted for representation, over the objections of the South Carolina secessionist convention. Returning escaped slaves was removed from the discretion of state governors in the provisional Constitution and made the responsibility of the Confederate government.

The permanent Confederate Constitution served for the duration of the government, with only one Amendment on May 21, 1861, when Congress was given the right to draw multiple federal judicial districts in the large states. The reservations of the South Carolina secession convention ratification were never taken up by any other state legislatures.

=== Functioning national government ===
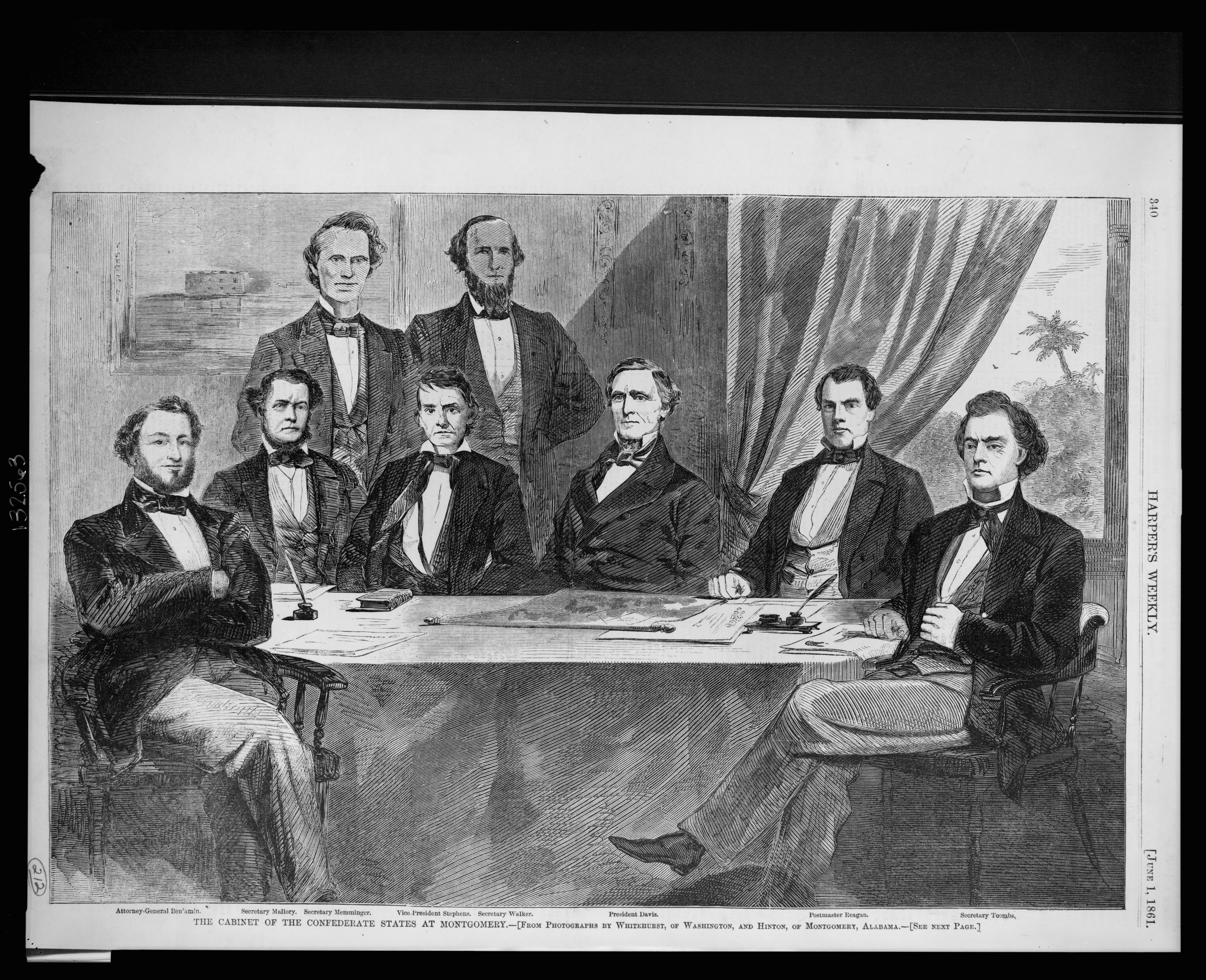
The first Confederate States presidential cabinet with President Jefferson Davis, Vice President Alexander H. Stephens, Attorney General Judah P. Benjamin, Secretary of the Navy Stephen M. Mallory, Secretary of the Treasury C. G. Memminger, Secretary of War Leroy Pope Walker, Postmaster John H. Reagan, and Secretary of State Robert Toombs

Sitting as the Provisional Congress, the gathering elected Jefferson Davis President of the Confederate States of America on February 9, the day after the Provisional Constitution had been adopted and five days after initially convening in Montgomery. On February 21, a week before it sat as a Constitutional Convention, the Provisional Congress established the several executive departments, virtually mirroring those of the U.S. Government. The only major exception was the Confederate Post Office, which was required to be financially self-sustaining. On March 4, 1861, the Confederacy adopted its first flag, which was used throughout the Confederacy on the battlefield and at government office buildings for the duration of the Civil War.

Following the Confederate attack on Fort Sumter in April 1861, the remaining six states admitted to the Confederate States of America with representation in its Congresses met in three additional sessions between July 1861 and February 1862 in the Virginia State Capitol in Richmond, Virginia. The Virginia secessionist convention was already in session, and, after Lincoln's call-up of 75,000 troops to secure federal property, on April 17 that convention voted 88 to 55 to secede. North Carolina, Tennessee, and Arkansas soon after called secessionist conventions that voted to leave the Union by overwhelming majorities. On May 6, 1861, the Confederate Congress officially declared war on the United States and authorized the President to use all land and naval forces in pursuit of the war that had commenced.

Arizona secessionists met in convention at La Mesilla and resolved to leave the Union on March 16, and duly sent a delegate to Montgomery to lobby for admission. On January 18, 1862, Congress seated Granville H. Oury as a non-voting delegate. The Southwest Indians were initially sympathetic to the Confederate cause, as many were slaveholders. During the spring and summer of 1861, Choctaws, Chickasaws, Seminoles, Creeks, and Cherokees held tribal conventions that resolved themselves into independent nations and began negotiations with the Provisional Congress. Commissioner of Indian Affairs Albert Pike made three kinds of treaties. The Five Civilized Tribes were allowed a non-voting delegate in Congress and the Confederacy assumed all debts owed to the United States Government. They, in turn, promised mounted volunteer companies. Agricultural tribes of Osages, Senecas, Shawnees, and Quapaws received clothes and industrial aids in return for military assistance. The Comanches and ten other tribes promised non-aggression in return for rations from the Confederate Government.

=== Mobilization ===
In the campaign leading up to state conventions, secessionist leaders had assured the Southern people that severing ties with the United States would be an uncontested event. As a precautionary measure, on February 28, the Provisional Congress authorized Davis to take control of all military operations among the states in the Confederacy, and on March 6 it authorized raising 100,000 troops for Confederate national forces for a year, with additional levies of state militias for six months.

Following the assault on Fort Sumter in April, Lincoln responded with a call for 75,000 troops among loyal states to restore federal property ceded by Southern state legislatures to the United States. The Provisional Congress answered by removing its limit on enlistment durations, and, following the victory at First Manassas, it authorized a Confederate army of 400,000 for the duration. Davis was authorized an additional 400,000 of state militia troops for service of one to three years.

On May 6, 1861, Congress authorized presidential issue of letters of marque and reprisal against vessels of the United States. Ship owners were eligible for eighty-five percent of everything seized. Subsequent legislation provided for a bonus of $20 for each person aboard a captured or destroyed vessel, and twenty percent of the value of each enemy warship sunk or destroyed. The tightening Union blockade made the privateers less effective, as they could not return prizes to Southern ports for disposition.

Early volunteer law enabled the president to accept seamen from the state navies, but few enlisted in Confederate service. In December 1861, Congress authorized an enlistment bonus of $50 in the attempt to raise 2,000 sailors for the duration, but the quota was not met. The draft law of April 16, 1862, in the First Session of the First Congress allowed conscripts to choose their branch of service. Navy enlistment was so small that state courts later recruited sailors by sentencing criminals to serve in the Navy.

=== Meeting at Richmond ===
On May 23, the Virginia Secession Convention voted to secede, and, shortly thereafter, the Virginia legislature invited the Confederate Congress to move to Richmond. After the state's voters overwhelmingly ratified the secession decisions a month later, the Congress ordered the next session to convene in Richmond on July 20.

Because Davis believed the Confederacy should embrace Kentucky and Missouri, the Provisional Congress appropriated $1 million each in late August to secure secession in those states.

The Provisional Congress in the Fifth Session reached two of the most far-reaching decisions for the Confederacy, both politically and militarily. The border states of Missouri and Kentucky were admitted into the Confederate States of America, requiring offensive military decisions otherwise uncalled for in the western theater, including violating Kentucky's neutrality. Their admission also provided a solid two-state delegation support amounting to 17% of the House and 15% of the Senate backing the Davis administration throughout the existence of the Confederacy. Treaties with the Five Civilized Tribes also allowed for their seating non-voting representatives in the Confederate Congress, as did the Arizona Territory. With the short-lived claim to the far-western Arizona Territory, by the end of 1861, the Confederacy had gained the greatest extent of its territorial expansion. After that point, its de facto governance contracted as Union military actions prevailed.

While the initial response to calls to rally to the Confederate Army and state militias was overwhelming in the short run, Davis foresaw that substantial numbers of the twelve-month volunteers would not re-enlist. Fully half of the entire Confederate Army might vanish in the spring of 1862. In an effort to extend volunteer service, on December 11, 1861, Congress provided for a $50 reenlistment bounty and a 60-day furlough for an enlistment of three years or the duration. The measure destabilized the entire Provisional Army, resulting in the ousting of large numbers of serving officers in company and regimental election campaigns. Railroad transportation was snarled with the glut of furloughed soldiers coming and going.

In the last of its actions, the Provisional Congress instructed the states in several duties. These included redrawing congressional districts to conform to the Confederate apportionment, reenacting election laws conforming to Confederate timetables, permitting out-of-state voting by soldiers and refugees, and electing two Confederate Congress senators to meet at the permanent Congress called on February 18, 1862. The Confederate Congresses and the Davis administration were the only two national civilian administrative bodies for the Confederacy.

The Confederate constitution contained a provision (Article I, Section 8, Clause 17), essentially duplicated from the United States Constitution, for the establishment of a federal district of up to one hundred square miles. It was widely assumed in the Confederacy that this district would be sited somewhere other than an existing state capital after the war was won, similar to how Washington, D.C., was founded, or even more optimistically that the Confederate seat of government might eventually be moved to Washington itself, provided that Maryland, a slave state with considerable pro-Confederate sympathies, were to come under Confederate control. Since none of this ever occurred, the permanent Confederate Congress continued to meet in Richmond until its dissolution.

== First Congress ==
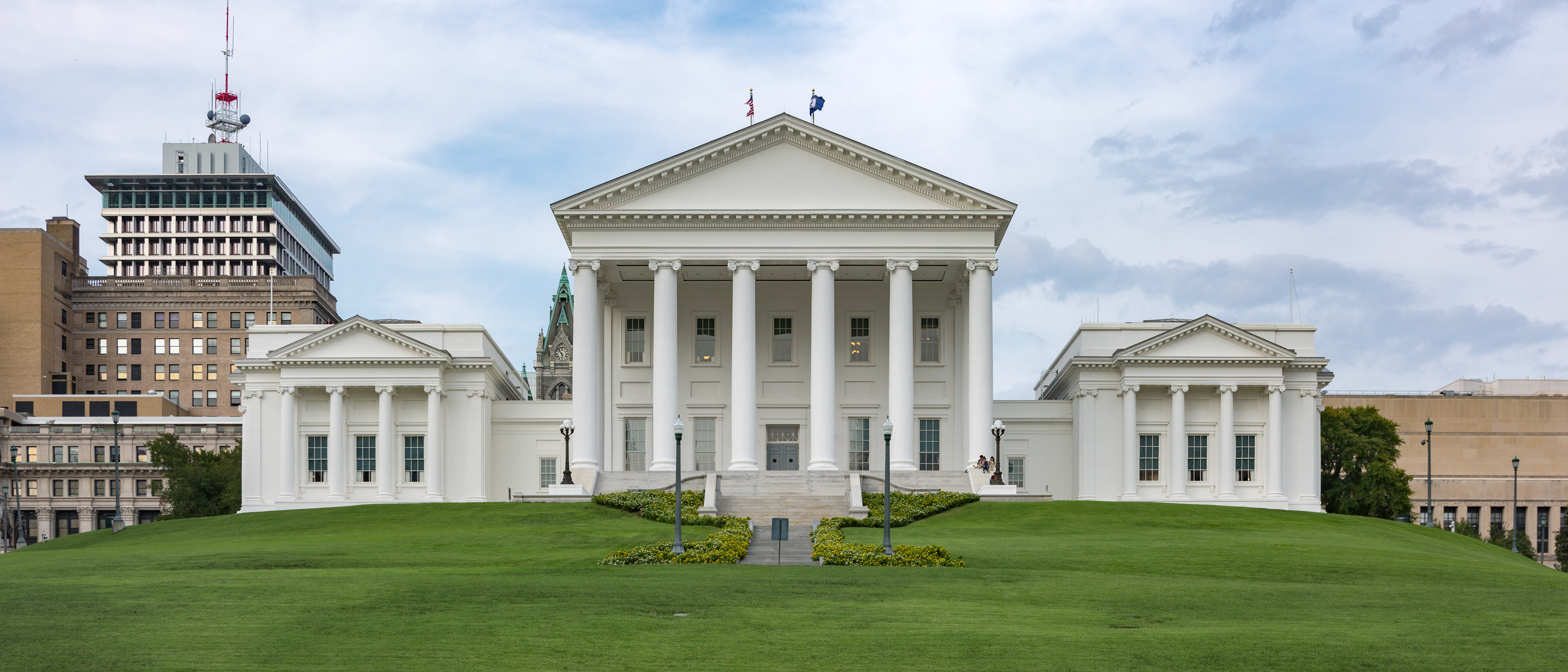
Later early 20th century view of The Virginia State Capitol on Capitol Hill, overlooking the James River of the state capital city of Richmond, Virginia. Built 1785–1788, designed by Thomas Jefferson (1743–1826) of Monticello near Charlottesville, Virginia, and elected third President (served 1801-1809). Virginia Capitol served as the state capitol for sessions of the General Assembly of Virginia (state legislature) since moving from colonial era capital in Williamsburg. Also here met the first and second elected Confederate States Congress during 1861–1865, of the American Civil War. – (Artwork / illustration of later picture post card view from early 20th century, showing South Front and landscaped lawn / grounds with additional east and west wings, constructed during extensive renovation project of 1903–1904 of architecture to match Jefferson's original 18th century designs.)

Elections for the First Confederate States Congress were held on November 6, 1861. While Congressional elections in the United States were held in even-numbered years, elections for Confederate Congressmen occurred in odd-numbered years. The First Congress met in four sessions in Richmond.

In the 105 House seats and 26 Senate seats, altogether 267 men served in the Confederate Congress. About a third had served in the U.S. Congress, and others had prior experience in their state legislatures. Only twenty-seven served continuously, including House Speaker Thomas S. Bocock and Senate President pro tempore Robert M. T. Hunter of Virginia, William Waters Boyce and William Porcher Miles of South Carolina, Benjamin Harvey Hill of Georgia, and Louis Wigfall of Texas. There was a rapid turnover in Congressional membership, in part due to some securing an officer's commission for military service. The mercurial Vice President, Alexander H. Stephens, soon withdrew to his home state of Georgia, and Senator Hunter served as an acting Vice President and then later briefly as Secretary of State for the Davis administration. Throughout the existence of the Confederate Congress, its sessions were held in secrecy. Both U.S Continental and Confederation Congresses had been held in secret, and the U.S. Congress did not open its galleries to newspaper reporters until 1800. Nevertheless, by summer 1862, newspapers such as the Daily Richmond Examiner began objecting to the closed sessions.

=== First general elections ===
On May 21, 1861, the Provisional Congress ordered elections for the First Congress under the Permanent Constitution to be held on the first Wednesday in November. Election campaigning for the First Congress went quietly, with newspapers announcing the election and gently observing that the tickets offered good and true men. Despite some few purely local contests, the outcome of these first Confederate congressional elections depended chiefly on the connections of friendships formed during earlier politics. Secessionists and unionists, Democrats and Whigs, had all previously had networks, and even without partisan labels, they all were practical men who used their previous contacts to get out the vote.

While newspapers observed prior party affiliations, there were no issues, no visible organization, no interstate affiliations, and nothing other than unswerving devotion to Southern principles and Confederate independence reported. While the "straight-out" secessionists tried to make early support of disunion a test of loyalty, most men continued to vote for about the same candidates who they used to do.

The Permanent Constitution required that the state legislatures elect senators to the Confederate Congress, and there was virtually no political campaigning. The usual state practice while sending senators to the U.S. Congress was to divide the senate seats between two major geographical divisions in each state, and the practice continued. In states where the Democratic and Whig votes had been closely matched in the 1860 elections, the state legislatures also filled the seats with a former Democrat and a former Whig. Usually legislatures sent their best men to the Confederate Senate, for instance Robert M. T. Hunter of Virginia left his post as Confederate Secretary of State, and William Lowndes Yancey of Alabama left his post at Confederate Commissioner to England to be senators.

The first general election held in the Confederacy went quietly. In mostly Union-controlled Missouri and Kentucky, where the secessionist governments were in flight out of state, secessionist governors appointed senators, and elections for representatives were held by soldier and refugee ballot. The results returned most of the provisional delegates who sought election as congressmen, and those who did not run were replaced by men of similar background. About a third of those elected would become administration opponents in a loyal opposition, but that would develop in Congress only after more assertive administration policies in the conduct of the war.

=== First Session of the First Congress ===
First and Second
Confederate Congress
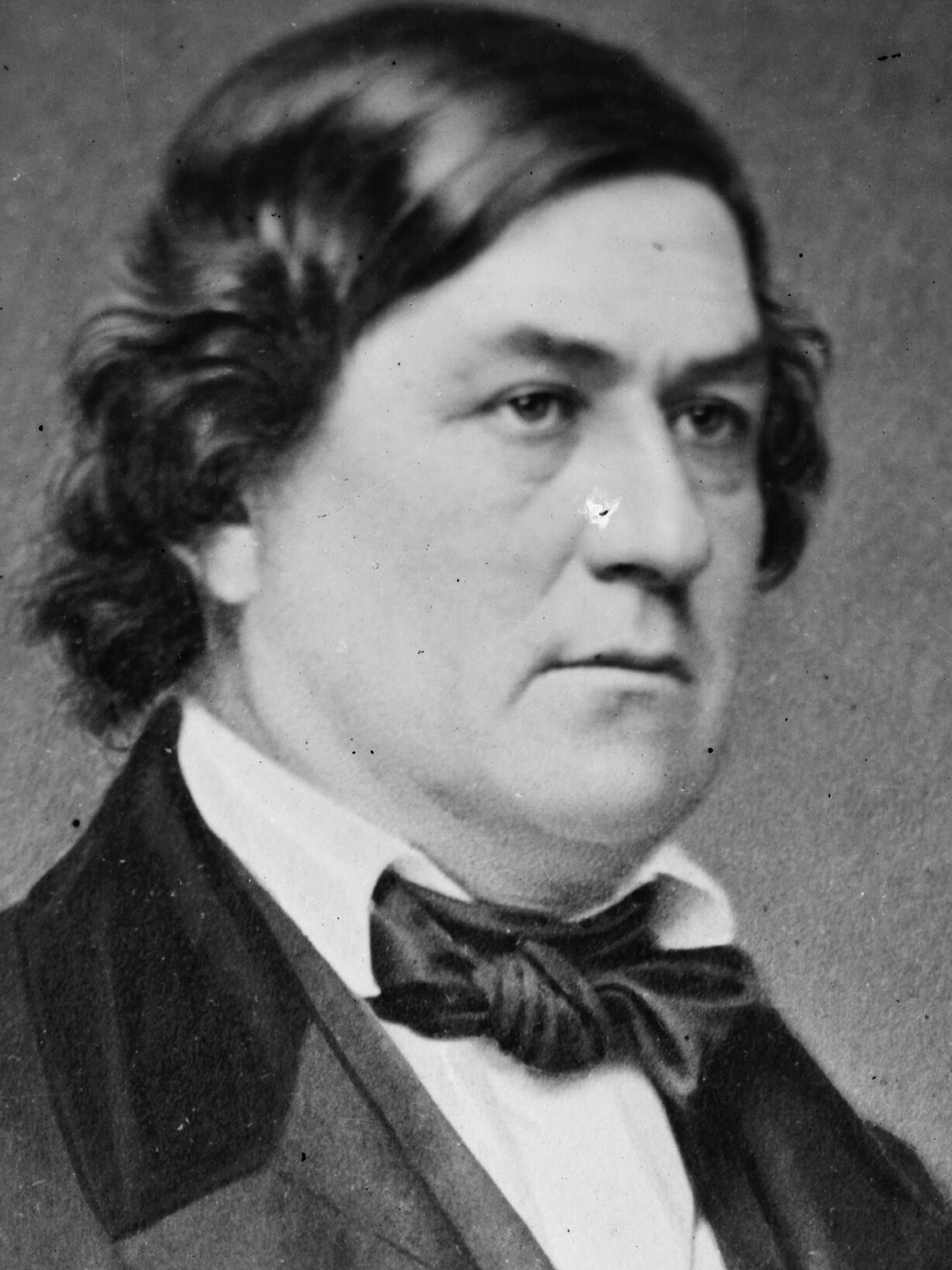
R. M. T. Hunter
Senate President
pro tem

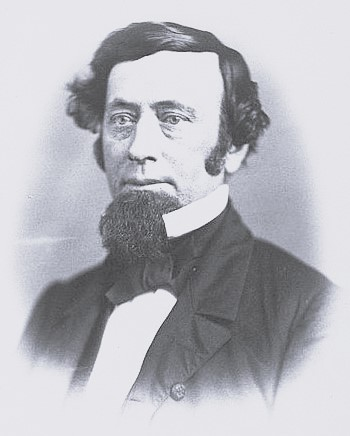
Thomas S. Bocock
House Speaker

The first session of the First Congress sat from February 18 to April 21, 1862, a total of 63 days. During this time, the states of Missouri, Kentucky and northwest Virginia were occupied by Union forces and used as staging areas for further advances into Confederate territory. After the Battle of Shiloh, Union forces moved into the Tennessee Valley reaching into Alabama. Amphibious operations by the Union saw gains along the Atlantic Coast furthering the Union blockade at Fernandia and St. Augustine, Florida, New Berne, North Carolina, and Fort Pulaski at Savannah, Georgia.

The elections of November 1861 gave every indication that the political accommodation between president and Congress would continue. The Battle of First Manassas and General Stonewall Jackson's Valley campaign bolstered confidence in the administration, and no major disasters had occurred. But during the spring of 1862 the pace of war quickened, and Union operations began in the West and along the coasts, resulting in Confederate territorial losses. It became evident that legislation could not be equitably applied in the lost territory and among the occupied population, and that additional burdens would fall on fewer Confederates.

While administration support was strongest in the First Session of the First Congress, strategic efforts at counterattacks into Kentucky and Maryland failed, and a war of attrition developed, leading many to criticize the administration for its war policy. Senator Robert M. T. Hunter of Virginia was an early supporter of Jefferson Davis's who turned severe critic, enough so that Lincoln recommended not arresting Hunter after the surrender at Appomattox. On the other hand, members representing districts already overrun and those actively contested by Union advances became stalwart administration supporters, advancing more aggressive measures. These assured Davis a solid Congressional base in the middle of the war, numbering 11 of the 28 senators, and 27 of the 122 Representatives.

==== Mobilization ====
After awaiting formal initiative from the Confederate Congress since December 1861 for the first national draft on the North American continent, Davis finally proposed military conscription of all men between 18 and 35 without deferring to the states for a policy unauthorized in the Confederate Constitution. The conscription bill was staffed by Robert E. Lee, and the draft was then forwarded to Secretary of War Judah P. Benjamin. It was introduced into the Senate by Louis T. Wigfall of Texas, a fire-eating secessionist and one of the few states' rights leaders to support conscription.

Enacted on April 16, the statute empowered the president to conscript directly, for three years or the duration, all men between ages 18 and 35 not exempted by law, and all of those enrolled in service would continue to serve for three years from the date of their enlistment. Thousands of additional volunteers in 1862 and 1863 enlisted to avoid the odium of being labeled a "conscript". Lee was able to use the reinforced army of trained recruits to defeat General George B. McClellan in the Seven Days Battles immediately before Richmond June 25 – July 1, when the army otherwise might have been halved by lapsing enlistments.

Generally, the volunteers in the army supported conscription; further, while most of the Southern press endorsed the measure, a strong minority opposed the idea. On April 14, Senator William Lowndes Yancey, a fire-eater of Alabama 1862–1863, proposed exemptions from the Confederate draft. It was termed "over generous" by one scholar, in a system of "class exemptions" related to the physically unfit, the politically connected, several service-related categories such as preachers, teachers and social workers, textile workers and a few other economic categories. It was passed at the end of the First Session of the First Congress.

After an earlier failed effort, Representative John Jones McRae of Alabama successfully secured legislation to establish a "Volunteer Navy", more like privateering and less like the regular navy. While formally a part of Confederate forces, they were to operate within "the ebb and flow of the tide".

Turning to strategic considerations of war policy, Representative William Smith of Virginia, former governor and future Confederate general and Virginia governor, proposed a band of "partisan rangers" to operate within enemy lines, and to be paid a bonus of $5 in addition to regular army pay for each enemy killed, as a way of raising men otherwise exempt. A substitute measure was passed in April that authorized Davis to commission officers to raise partisan bands. The experiment was a failure, as rangers tended to spend their time attacking Confederate civilians. By the end of 1863, Lee was recommending that the law be repealed.

Following the recommendation of Davis on March 28, Congress enacted its Conscription Act on April 16, the first military draft on the North American continent. It required three years' military service of all white males from ages eighteen to thirty-five. Substitutes were allowed. All volunteers, a majority of the army, had their terms of service extended, although they were granted a sixty-day furlough and the privilege of electing their own company-grade officers, captain and below. In addition to its "class-exemption system" deferring school teachers, river pilots, and iron foundry workers, Congress in October 1862 exempted owners or overseers of twenty or more slaves. Public opposition exploded, objecting to a system making the war a "rich man's war" and a "poor man's fight". Conscription Bureau officers often acted like kidnappers or press gangs as they enforced the draft. Southern men began volunteering for military service to avoid the stigma of being labelled a conscript. Many entered state militias, where they would be restricted to service within their states, as in Georgia. Nevertheless, the Confederacy managed to mobilize practically the entire Southern military population, generally amounting to over a third of the manpower available to the Union until 1865.

In February 1862, a group of Georgia congressmen, led by the Cobb brothers and Robert Augustus Toombs, a former Confederate Secretary of State, called for a "scorched earth policy" before advancing Union troops, stating that the Confederacy should "Let every woman have a torch, every child a firebrand" to deprive Union troops of resources. On retiring from a city or town, the group stated that the Confederacy should "let a desert more terrible than the Sahara welcome the Vandals." It became popular to believe that the loss and self-destruction of a city would make little difference in the ultimate outcome of the war; the vast size of the Confederacy would make its conquest impossible.

Thus, by the spring of 1862, it was obvious that, if the Confederacy were to survive, Southerners were of necessity changing their ante-bellum worldview, including constitutional principles, economic markets, and political axioms. Davis referred to the Confederacy's "darkest hour", and, with the consent of Congress, reconstituted his cabinet on March 19. Thomas H. Watts, an Alabama Whig, became the Attorney General, and, without a Confederate Supreme Court, he became the de facto final arbiter of legal questions involving the national government. Congress had authorized the president to suspend the writ of habeas corpus and to declare martial law in any city, town, or military district at his personal discretion as of February 27, and by March both Norfolk and Richmond were under martial law.

=== Second Session of the First Congress ===
The Second Session of the First Congress met from August 18 to October 13, 1862. During this period, Union river operations had continued success, capturing Memphis, Tennessee, and Helena, Arkansas. Along the Atlantic Coast, the Union captured Fort Macon-Beaufort, Hatteras Inlet, North Carolina, and Norfolk, Virginia. The most strategic breakthrough for the Union was the capture of New Orleans and surrounding territory in Louisiana. By summer 1862, every Southern state had some Union occupation.

==== Mobilization ====
Congress continued to address manpower and mobilization needs in the Second Session of the First Congress. Given war displacement of border state men into the Deep South, and the practice of draft evaders relocating to avoid conscription in their old home counties, on October 8 Congress authorized the Bureau of Conscription to enroll eligible men into army service wherever they might be found. To meet local defense needs, Congress permitted men over age 45 and those otherwise exempt to form local defense units and to be incorporated into the regular army. Without a guarantee for prohibiting service outside of their home state, few enrolled. Although a proposal to draft resident foreigners was considered, the Congress had no desire to form immigrant units en masse as the Union did, and foreigners were exempted.

By September 2, during the Second Session of the First Congress, a strong group of states' righters in Congress tried to remove conscription from presidential authority and to place it in the hands of the states. Representative Henry S. Foote of Tennessee, a former Unionist who had defeated Davis for Governor of Mississippi, insisted in the Confederate House on state control of conscription, and warned that the Davis bill would lead to a Confederate civil war. When Davis responded with a successful measure to increase conscription to the ages of 16 to 45, these same members sought to limit his authority to raising 300,000 troops a year. The anti-Davis-conscription caucus failed on both counts.

In an effort to curb abuses, known refuges for draft-dodgers were eliminated for newly minted teachers, tanners, and preachers by exempting only those who had been practitioners for two or more years. The question of exempting overseers was controversial, as planters had classified their sons for the occupational exemption. Border-state senators, who generally were staunch allies of Davis's, aligned with non-planting elements of the Confederate House to restrict the plantation exemption to one white man at all times. Generally, skilled artisans, laborers in essential occupations and public utilities, and managerial government personnel were exempted. By the end of the Second Session in the fall of 1862, Congress believed that it had established military and home-front manpower coordination for the duration.

=== Third Session of the First Congress ===
The Third Session of the First Congress ran from January 12 until May 1, 1863. The battles of Fredericksburg and Chancellorsville stymied Union attempts to advance in the eastern theater, but it achieved victories along the Mississippi at Baton Rouge, Louisiana, and Fort Hindeman, Arkansas. In 1863, Lee's Confederate strike into Pennsylvania was turned back at Gettysburg, and General Kirby Smith's invasion of Kentucky was ended at Perryville.

==== Mobilization ====
At the opening of the Third Session of the First Congress on December 7, 1862, opposition to the substitution provision of the April 16 conscription act was substantial. The cost of substitutes had been brokered from $100 initially up to as much as $5,000 per enlistee. Many objected to the provision as "class legislation". The substitutes themselves were generally unsatisfactory soldiers, over 40 years of age and from undisciplined backgrounds. Some substitutes "bounty jumped", deserting only to collect another substitute bonus. Within the army the remaining substitutes were mostly unpatriotic, shiftless, and held in contempt.

At the extension of the draft to men between ages 35 and 45 in the previous session, those who had been substitutes subsequently were found in most state courts to be liable to service in their own name, nullifying the earlier enlistment substitution without violation of contract; some state courts did not. A Senate bill to nationalize substitution policy failed in the House, perhaps due to upcoming elections in November.

Secretary of War James Seddon reported that over 10,000 men not in the army held fraudulent substitute papers to avoid conscription. The bill passed in December prohibited any further use of substitutes, and, in January, draft evaders with fraudulent substitute papers were subject to conscription and their substitute would be required to remain in service. State courts upheld both laws. While the army was not materially augmented, an important cause of dissatisfaction in the ranks was removed.

In the conscription law as initially passed, there was an exemption for an owner or overseer of twenty or more slaves. Most newspapers subsequently condemned the provision as the worst sort of class legislation. The state legislatures of North Carolina, Louisiana, and Texas petitioned Congress to repeal or amend the provision. On January 12, 1863, Davis advised Congress that some amendment was required allowing for policing the slave population without preferential treatment for the slave-owning class. Congress debated and negotiated an adjustment to the law from January until May. It finally agreed to exempt only overseers so employed before April 16, 1862. In the administration of plantation overseer exemptions, the War Department moved cautiously, granting temporary exemptions to those engaged in food production. The critique of the Davis administration waging a "rich man's war and a poor man's fight" persisted, objected by the poor as being discriminatory and by the upcountry on sectional grounds.

In March, Postmaster John H. Reagan proposed, with the support of Davis, that the 1,509 men of the postal service should be exempted from the draft. Congress immediately exempted most contractors and their drivers. On April 2, those elected to Congress, state legislatures, and several other state posts were exempted.

Following the Battle of Antietam, where Lee failed to gain additional Marylander recruits, Representative George G. Vest of Missouri brought to the attention of Congress, in January 1863, that there were some 2,000 Marylanders vocally supporting the Confederacy in the environs of Richmond, displaced as were numerous citizens of Missouri, and that the Marylanders should also be subject to conscription laws. Both House and Senate passed enabling legislation, but Davis pocket-vetoed the measure at the close of session in May for fear of alienating a state that was virtually neutral in the conflict.

The Confederate Congress never developed a coherent anti-administration party, but, in 1863, facing re-election amidst growing dissatisfaction with the Davis administration, it did refuse to extend Davis's authority to suspend habeas corpus nationally as an emergency power. Nevertheless, state courts in the Confederacy substantially upheld the prerogatives asserted by the Davis government. Likewise, Congress did not enact a bill allowing commanding generals to appoint their own staffs, allowing Davis to place his personal stamp on every chain of command. Historian Emery Thomas has noted that, in the name of wartime emergency, Davis "all but destroyed the political philosophy which underlay the founding of the Southern Republic," and Congress furthered his purposes.

Extending the earlier conscription of whites into the Confederate Army, Congress now allowed impressment of slaves as military laborers. Army quartermaster and commissary officers were authorized to seize private property for army use, compensated at below-market prices with depreciated currency. Not only did the Confederate States Congress anticipate the United States initiating a draft to conscript a mass army, it began a graduated income tax, both monetary and in-kind, fifty years before the U.S. government did. The graduated income tax spanned from one percent for monetary incomes under $500 to 15 percent for those over $1,500; in addition, a 10-percent tax was levied on all profit from sale of foodstuffs, clothing and iron, and all agriculture and livestock were taxed at 10 percent of everything grown or slaughtered. Congress authorized $500 million in bonds in an effort to stem inflation. But, in a wartime economy, inflation went from 300 percent for a gold dollar to 2,000 percent from January 1863 to January 1864, an inflation rate of over 600 percent in one year. The inflation rate discouraged investment in bonds, and only $21 million was retired from circulation.

=== Fourth Session of the First Congress ===
Following an intersession during the military campaign season, the Fourth Session of the First Congress met from December 7, 1863, to February 17, 1864. The Union achieved control of the Mississippi River with the fall of Vicksburg, the capture of Fort Hudson, Louisiana, along with victories at Fort Smith and Little Rock, Arkansas. Union advances in eastern Tennessee were signaled by the fall of Knoxville and Chattanooga. At the end of the First Confederate Congress, it controlled just over a half of its congressional districts, while Federals occupied two-fifths and almost one-tenth were disrupted by military conflict.

Davis had urged immediate measures to increase the Confederacy's effective manpower as Congress reconvened on December 7, but it did not act until its adjournment on February 17, 1864. It expanded the draft ages from 18–40 to 17–50. It substantially cut exemption classifications, and authorized the use of free blacks and slaves as cooks, teamsters, laborers, and nurses.

By the close of the First Congress, the army had about 500,000 men enrolled, but only half of them were present for duty. The other 250,000 were lost to shirking, disloyalty, and poor policing of deserters. There was widespread abuse of the system of class exemptions, including teachers, apothecaries, newly minted artisans with scant business, and small state government employees hired at less than subsistence wages. For a price, doctors diagnosed "rheumatism" and "low back" pain. The net result by June 1864 was a present-for-duty strength in all Confederate armies totaling not more than 200,000, about 100,000 fewer than the year before.

While every state supreme court had upheld conscription by 1863, litigious draftees would challenge the Bureau of Conscription and so delay their enlistment in state courts for months. State governors resisted conscription of their citizens between ages 35 and 45 by enlisting them in state forces, then refusing to transfer them to the Confederacy for even temporary service.

Congress reauthorized the suspension of habeas corpus at Davis's discretion. It extended the tax law of 1863, and, although there was some relief from the earlier double taxation of agricultural products, it generally required greater material sacrifice for the war effort. A Compulsory Funding Measure sought to curb inflation, but failed to do so. Finally, the Congress authorized requiring half of all cargo space aboard ships running the blockade to be dedicated to government shipments, and forbade any export of cotton or tobacco without Davis's express permission.

== Second Congress ==
The Second Congress served only one year of its two-year term due to the defeat of the Confederacy in 1865. Although the Confederate States did not establish political parties, the Congress was still dominated by Democrat politicians. However, the low electoral turnout threw out many secessionist and pro-Davis incumbents in favor of former Whigs: The number of anti-Davis members in the House increased from twenty-six of 106 in the First Congress to forty-one in the Second Congress. This weakened the administration's ability to get its policies through Congress; nevertheless the Davis administration maintained control of the government.

The Confederate States Congress was sometimes unruly. The journal clerk shot and killed the chief clerk, and Henry S. Foote was attacked with "fists, a Bowie knife, a revolver and an umbrella". In a Senate debate, Benjamin H. Hill threw an inkstand at William Lowndes Yancey, and Yancey and Edward A. Pollard had such fierce attacks on one another that newspapers would not publish the exchange for fears of their personal safety. Military glory could be had on the battlefield, but Congress and congressmen were held in contempt, in some part due to the members' habit of berating one another in personal terms. Nevertheless, one historian of the Confederacy assessed the Congress as "better than its critics made it." The Confederacy lived out its existence during wartime, and virtually all of congressional action addressed that fact. While it took an interest in military affairs, it never followed the U.S. Congress's example of harassing either the President, his cabinet, or military commanders. Despite Davis's bitter Congressional critics, he dominated the Congress throughout most of the war until near the very end. Davis vetoed thirty-nine bills in total, deemed unconstitutional or unwise, and these were upheld in the Congress for all but the bill for free postage for newspapers addressed to soldiers.

The election of 1863 to seat the Second Confederate Congress hinged on a referendum on the administration's war program. Among the 40% of the total elected membership who ran on opposition, there was little reservation about expressing their reservations about various administration proposals. The five unoccupied states where most of the opposition were drawn had 59 districts in the House (56%). Oppositionists obtained 36 members, with 61% of those districts in opposition. These elections were held among resident voters rather than in army camps by state regiment.

However, Davis was practically invulnerable to personal criticism (although individual cabinet members or generals came under Congressional attack from time to time). All things considered, the Confederate government ran more smoothly than that of the United States, where Lincoln faced congressional committees of inquiry. Davis did have influence over the Confederate Congress, primarily from agreement based on ideology, but, without party discipline in Congress, Davis was frustrated in his execution of proposed policy by lengthy deliberations, amendments, and the occasional rejection.

The administration was fundamentally sustained by support from the Congress for three principal reasons. First, Congressional membership universally wanted to win the war. Its members deferred to Davis's suggestions whenever they could out of patriotism. When they did not, they were unobtrusive in their opposition. Opposition strategy was focused on modifying proposals rather than rejecting them out of hand. Second, the opposition lacked a consistent membership. Most administration opponents backed several elements of the Davis war program, and that program itself changed, along with public reaction to it. There was no consistent pressure from the electorate to oppose Davis, and no organizational loyalty to a formal opposition caucus. Third, as the Second Congress began, six states were largely in enemy hands. The administration received its main support from them: Arkansas, Louisiana, Mississippi, Missouri, Kentucky, and Tennessee. These states had 47 districts in the House (44%), and they had only 5 (10%) opponents of the administration.

During the Second Congress, the administration was defeated on four major issues. First, Davis wanted complete control over conscription exemptions to determine who would work and who would fight. Congress sustained class exemptions of the 1862 legislation, however modified. Second, the financial proposals set forth by the Treasury Department were repeatedly disregarded. Third, in 1865, Congress refused to reauthorize suspending the writ of habeas corpus. Fourth, Congress delayed presidential authority to arm slaves for military duty until March 16, 1865.

=== Second general election ===
The elections for the Second Confederate Congress took place at the time of the regular state and local elections held in each state. As a result, their dates ranged from May 1863 to May 1864. Only Virginia's on May 28, 1863, was held before the reverses at Vicksburg and Gettysburg, and Virginia's delegation had a turnover of forty percent. The war was going badly not only for Virginia, but for the South generally during the other elections, and citizens were adversely affected by conscription, taxes, food supply, and the economy generally. Unlike elections to the First Congress, which often were personality contests over who showed the most enthusiastic support of secession, Congressmen facing re-election had roll-call voting records that they had to defend. In Georgia, Louisiana, Texas, Kentucky, Tennessee, and Arkansas, the state delegations saw a turnover of half or more.

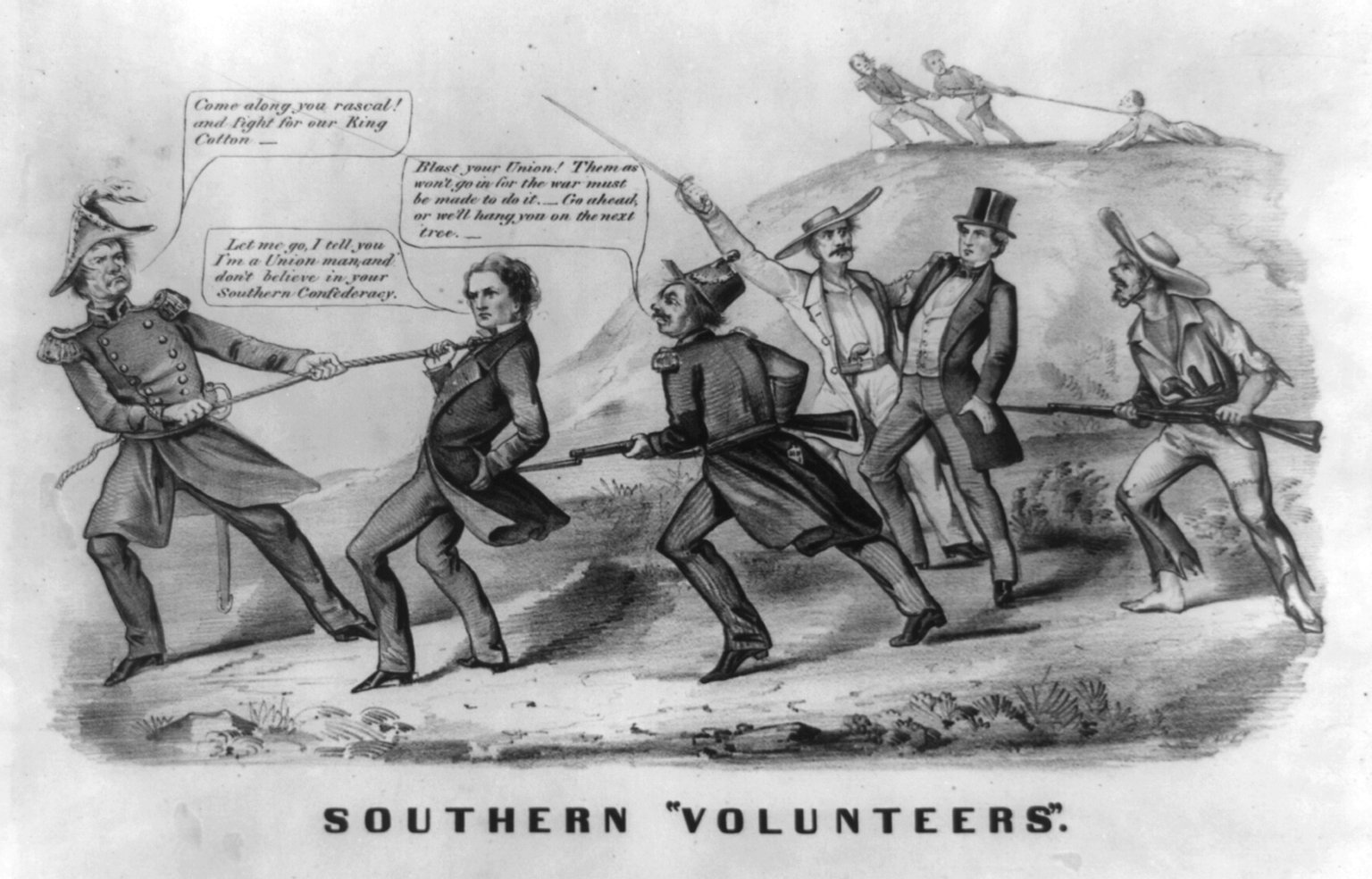
Resistance to Confederate conscription, by Currier and Ives, 1862

The major campaign issue was the Davis administration and the conduct of the war. Central government policies had become specific and expansive to meet growing war needs compared to two years previously. The everyday life of every class and group were affected. Objections did not mean an abandonment of the Confederacy, but rather that war weariness had fomented dissension in the public discussion. Even in 1863, the pre-war party organizations continued to be influential. In the face of repeated Confederate military reverses, the early secessionists maintained that only "true" men could legislate in times of peril. Unlike the quiet campaigns of two years earlier, the campaigns of 1863 were marked by angry political acrimony.

Generally candidates running on an anti-administration platform focused on one or two particularly unpopular issues in their local districts, without offering any alternative, although all appealed to states' rights, and most made direct appeals to the soldier vote with promises of pay increases or better rations, tobacco allotments, and homesteads in the territories. Peace proponents sought independence but wanted negotiations to begin before the end of hostilities. They were important in half the districts of North Carolina, Georgia, and Alabama. Conscription and exemption laws were leading political issues all along the eastern seaboard and in Mississippi. Taxation, impressment of produce, and in-kind taxation were widely seen as confiscatory. This was especially important in Virginia. Elsewhere, the poor objected to regressive schedules and the rich called for the government to purchase entire crops of cotton. Administration suspension of habeas corpus to corral able-bodied men dodging military service was especially offensive in North Carolina, Georgia, and Alabama.

The results overall did not result in a no-confidence majority against the administration. Former Democrats still outnumbered former Whigs 55–45 percent, but war weariness had taken its toll among the civilian population. The delegations from North Carolina, South Carolina, and Georgia were the most antagonistic to the Davis administration, and Alabama, Florida, and Texas only slightly less so. The Missouri, Kentucky, and Tennessee delegations were largely elected by soldier vote, and so were solidly pro-administration, as were the congressmen nominally elected to represent districts encompassing the Union-occupied regions of Virginia—these were mostly in West Virginia, since its admission to the Union as a separate state was never recognized by the Confederacy. At the time of elections in each state, just over forty percent of the Congressional Districts were occupied or disrupted by Union forces, yet the fragmentary Congressional results from army and refugee camps were accepted as representative of the majority of residents in each state, a practice that one historian has called delusional. As historian Wilfred B. Yearns concluded, "Only the nearly solid support from occupied districts enabled President Davis to maintain a majority in Congress until the last days of the nation."

=== Second Congress, First Session ===
After a two-and-a-half-month intersession from the end of the First Congress, the First Session of the Second Confederate Congress sat from May 2 until June 14, 1864. During this period, General William T. Sherman began his March to the Sea, and General Ulysses S. Grant advanced to the outskirts of Richmond at Cold Harbor, Virginia. Confederate forces fell back into defensive positions.

==== Mobilization ====
In his message to Congress on December 7, 1863, Davis insisted that Congress must "add largely to our effective forces as promptly as possible." He proposed adding older men aged 45–60 to the draft to replace able-bodied men performing inactive duties. Seddon proposed that Congress organize non-conscripts in every state to hunt down deserters and to assist local enrolling officers.

The first draft law had compelled a three-year term of service for volunteers whose enlistment was about to expire. Seddon now proposed extending their service for the duration, as 315 regiments and 58 battalions were eligible for discharge in 1864. Lee had earlier proposed the end of all class exemptions, and General William J. Hardee along with twenty other generals had publicly proposed that all men should be eligible for service, both black and white, from the ages of 15 to 60.

From December to February, Congress considered bills and reported out a measure that passed both houses on February 17, 1864. It provided for conscription for the duration of white men from ages 17 to 50. Those between 18 and 45 years of age would be retained in their field organizations. Those aged 17–18 and 45–50 would constitute a reserve corps for detail duty, subject to military duty in their home states. Exemptions in government were limited to those certified as necessary. Plantation overseers were exempted only if provisions were provided at set impressment prices; other enumerated occupations were exempted only if they had been engaged for a number of years. Postal workers and railroad employees were exempted, as well as those the president was authorized to detail.

Following complaints of Confederate civilian depredations by independent Confederate ranger units, Lee's flat recommendation to terminate them, and General Jeb Stuart's assessment that they were inefficient and detrimental to the best interests of the army, Congress reconsidered the "partisan ranger" innovation of April 1862. On February 17, 1864, Congress absorbed the existing Confederate bands of rangers into the regular army, although permitting the Secretary of the Army to use regular troops in a ranger capacity within enemy lines.

At the same time, Congress again suspended the writ of habeas corpus from February 15 to August 1, 1864. It was seen as the most effective way to enforce conscription, maintain Confederate Army coherence, and arrest potential traitors and spies.

=== Second Congress, Second Session ===
Following an intersession from June 15 to November 6, 1864, the Second Session of the Second Congress sat from November 7, 1864, to March 18, 1865. This period saw the military collapse of the Confederacy, as Sherman turned northward in his Carolinas campaign, and both Fort Fisher and Charleston, South Carolina, were captured. Union advances in the Valley of Virginia forced a collapse of Confederate forces onto Richmond. At the end of the Civil War, 45 percent of Confederate congressional districts were occupied, 20 percent were disrupted by military conflict, and only 33.9 percent were under Confederate control in three geographical pockets in Appalachia, the Lower South, and the Trans-Mississippi West.

==== Mobilization ====
By the convening of the Second Session of the Second Congress, the inadequacy of all previous military laws had been made apparent through the summer of 1864 during Grant's Wilderness campaign and the Siege of Petersburg, Sherman's Atlanta campaign, and Sheridan's Valley campaigns of 1864.

While the emergency was agreed to on all sides, Congress was still undecided as to how much authority it should grant Davis. There were still 125,000 men on the exemption lists. With support from Seddon, John T.L. Preston, the Superintendent of Conscription, and Lee, Davis recommended to Congress that the entire exemption system be replaced by a regime of executive detail, allowing him to decide who would work and who would fight.

Although a few in each house of Congress supported the Davis exemption proposal, radical states' righters sought to restore the exemptions of the 1863 level. The largest group in both houses sought to make some small concessions to the looming manpower emergency. They chose to focus on tightening the administration of the draft, including abolishing exemptions for postal workers, railroad men, and overseers, and abolishing all provost marshals not connected to the army. All such proposals died in committee, and the passed legislation to replace existing commissary officers and quartermasters with bonded agents was vetoed as "seriously impairing our ability to supply armies in the field".

At the opening of the last session of the Confederate Congress, the conscription law of February 17, 1864, effectively had reorganized the state militias with men outside the draft ages. Thus reconstituted, state governors had lent these troops to district commanders through the campaign season of 1864 only as the Union offensives encroached upon their state boundaries. The resulting limitations on training and experience made them of little value in combat. On November 7, 1864, Davis responded to that battlefield experience with the request for a law empowering him to organize, arm, and train all state militias for central government deployment. Congress was reluctant to subject state militias to central government direction. A bill passed in the House was never acted on by the Senate.

In a related consideration about the thousands exempted in state government service, on November 10, Representative Waller R. Staples of Virginia was able to secure a report from the Superintendent of Conscription over the objections of Representative James T. Leach of North Carolina, who protested the questioning of any state's loyalty. The report identified only North Carolina and Georgia as harboring "excessive exemptions" among their state agencies. Both houses of Congress dropped the investigation.

A bill concerning the exemption system reported out of conference committee did become law on March 16, 1865, but Davis accepted the law as passed reluctantly. It did not allow him the power to detail all southern men for emergency defense. In a final effort to increase manpower by tinkering with exemptions, Congress abolished the Bureau of Conscription, replacing it with one administered by the army, netting some 3,000 employees.

Although the subject of impressing slaves as soldiers as well as laborers had been considered and rejected in the Confederate press throughout 1864, by September 6, Seddon wrote privately to Louisiana Governor Henry W. Allen that every able-bodied slave should be used as a soldier. But, in October, he publicly refused to commit to the proposal, and Davis was also evasive. At the opening of the last session of Congress on November 7, Representative William Graham Swan of Tennessee sought a resolution against the use of Negro soldiers. The equivocating Davis effectively stalled the House, and a Committee was appointed to confer with the president to no avail.

In January, Congress received communication from Lee advocating the enlistment of slaves and their subsequent emancipation. On February 10, Representative Ethelbert Barksdale of Mississippi and Senator Williamson S. Oldham of Texas introduced bills in their respective houses providing for the raising of Negro troops, with Oldham proposing a requisition of 200,000 and Barksdale a number at the president's discretion. Lee weighed in with another letter warning that the measure was both expedient and necessary, and that if the Confederate Congress did not use them, the Union Army would. The bill passed Congress, with a majority of Representatives from North Carolina, Texas, Arkansas, and Missouri voting against. The provision for manumission failed in the Senate by one vote, until the Virginia Assembly then in session, instructed its senators to vote for an emancipation provision, and the bill then passed with a nine to eight vote. The Act of March 13, 1865, authorized the president to raise 300,000 troops "irrespective of color". A bitter Davis complained that he had wanted a statute arming the slaves the year before, at the beginning of 1864.

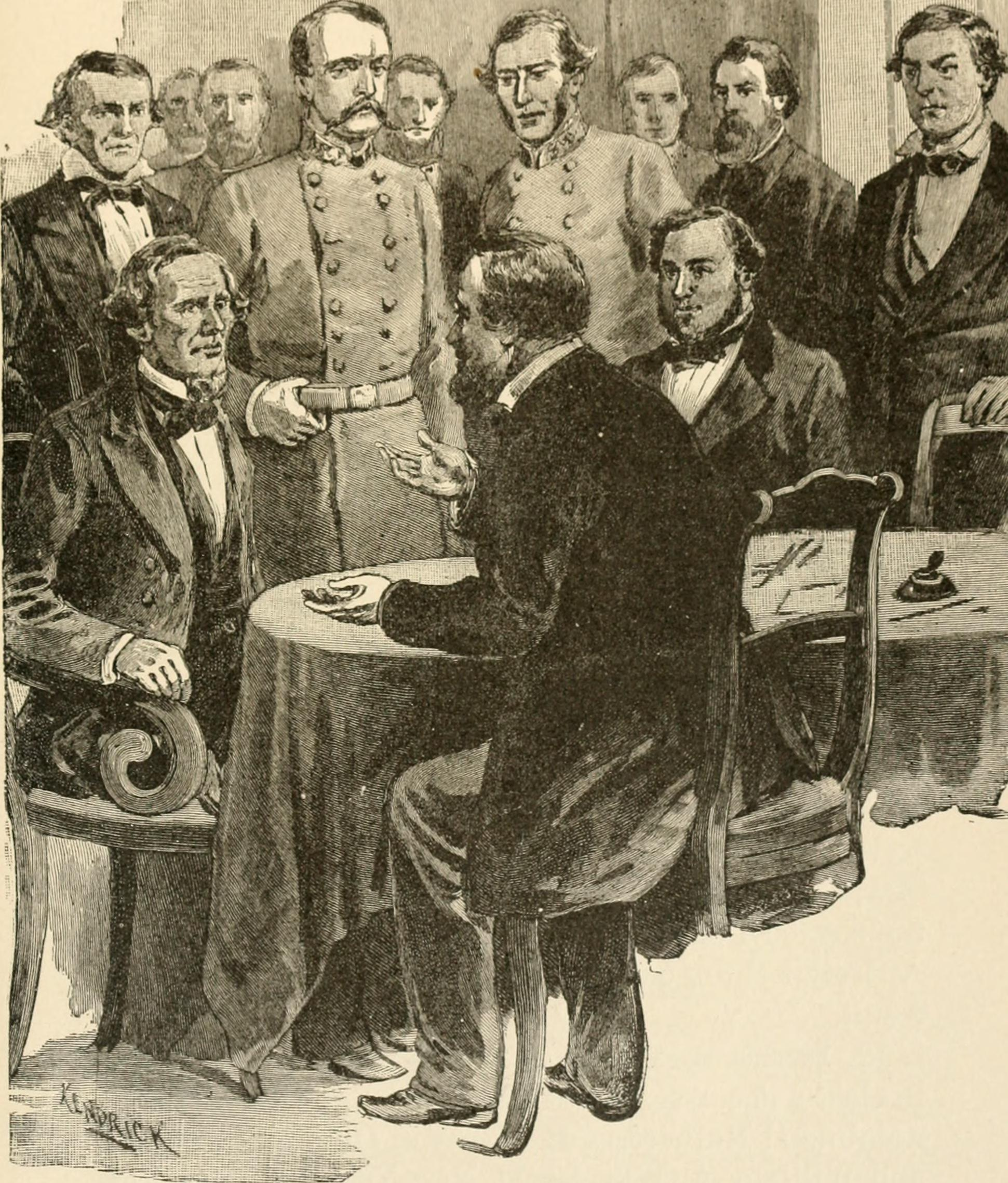
The last meeting of the Confederate Cabinet before the dissolution of the Confederacy in Washington, Georgia

On February 6, 1865, Congress made Lee commanding general of all Confederate armies. In March, one of its final acts was the passage of a law allowing for the military induction of any slave willing to fight for the Confederacy. This measure had originally been proposed by Patrick Cleburne a year earlier but had met stiff opposition until the final months of the war, when it was endorsed by Lee. Davis had proposed buying 40,000 slaves and emancipating them, but neither Congress nor the Virginia General Assembly considered a similar proposal would provide for emancipation. Opponents such as Howell Cobb of Georgia claimed such an action would be "the beginning of the end of the revolution. If slaves will make good soldiers, our whole theory of slavery is wrong." Davis and the War Department responded by fiat in General Order Number Fourteen asserting emancipation: "No slave will be accepted as a recruit unless with his own consent and with the approbation of his master by a written instrument converting, as far as he may, the rights of a freedman." On March 23, the first black company of Confederates were seen drilling in the streets of Richmond.

In the closing days of the Confederacy, Congress and Davis were at loggerheads. The executive recommendations were debated, but not acted upon. March 18, 1865, was the last day of official business in the history of the Confederate States Congress. The Senate was still in secret session and the House in open session, although it adjourned with the wistful sine die as a last entry, "the Confederate Congress, with its work still undone went silent forever".

Davis met with his cabinet for the last time on May 5, 1865, in Washington, Georgia. Davis's cabinet declared the Confederate States of America dissolved and forthwith ceased any attempt to continue operating the executive branch of the Confederate government. As with the U.S. Constitution on which the C.S. Constitution was based, the president and executive branch had no constitutional power to dissolve the Confederate Congress under any circumstances, but, in any event, the fall of Richmond followed by the surrender and dissolution of the Confederate armies in April effectively had quashed any realistic prospect of the Confederate Congress ever re-convening. The Congress of the Confederate States of America is therefore generally considered to have been dissolved along with the entire Confederate government by May 5, 1865, at the latest; however, under a strict interpretation of the U.S. constitutional principle of separation of powers, the Confederate Congress's de facto dissolution is regarded as being effective from the adjournment of its last meeting on March 18.

== Apportionment and representation ==
The Confederate States Congress had delegations from 13 states and several territories and Indian tribes. The state delegation apportionment was specified in the Confederate Constitution using the same population basis for the free population and a three-fifths rule for slaves as had been used in the U.S. Constitution. There was to be one representative for every ninety thousand of the apportionment population, with any remaining fraction justifying an additional Congressman. After all thirteen states were admitted, there were 106 representatives in the Confederate House. The four most populous states were in the Upper South, and, shortly after the war began, the Union occupied all of Kentucky and Missouri, along with large portions of western Virginia and western Tennessee. Nevertheless, these states maintained full delegations in both national legislative bodies throughout the war. The seven original Confederate states had a total of forty-six representatives, or 43 percent of the House.

Except for the four states west of the Mississippi River (Missouri, Arkansas, Louisiana, and Texas), all Confederate states' apportionment in the U.S. Congress was going to decline into the 1860s. In the Confederate Congress, all would have larger delegations than they had from the census of 1850, except South Carolina, which was equal, and Missouri, which declined by one. The Confederate States Congress maintained representation in Virginia, Tennessee, and Louisiana throughout its existence. Unlike the U.S. Congress, there was no requirement for a majority of the voters in 1860 to vote for representatives for them to be seated. From 1861 to 1863, Virginia (east, north and west), Tennessee, and Louisiana had U.S. representation. Then, for 1863–1865, only the newly admitted West Virginia had U.S. representation. However, the whole of antebellum Virginia continued to be formally represented in the Confederate Congress until 1865, and West Virginians living in counties not under Federal control continued to participate in Confederate elections.

Apportionment
#	State	U.S. 1850	U.S. 1860	CSA
1.	Virginia	13	11	16
2.	Tennessee	10	8	11
3.	Georgia	8	7	10
3.	North Carolina	8	7	10
5.	Alabama	7	6	9
6.	Louisiana	4	5	6
6.	Mississippi	5	5	7
8.	South Carolina	6	4	6
8.	Texas	2	4	6
10.	Arkansas	2	3	4
11.	Florida	1	1	2
--	Kentucky	10	9	12
--	Missouri	7	9	6

== Chart of Congresses and Sessions ==
Sessions of the Congress of the Confederate States of America and its Constitutional Convention
Congress	Session	Place	Date Convened	Date Adjourned	States & Territories Attending
Provisional	1st S.	Montgomery, Alabama	February 4, 1861	March 16, 1861	AL, FL, GA, LA, MS, SC, TX
Constitutional Convention	---	Montgomery	February 28, 1861	March 11, 1861	AL, FL, GA, LA, MS, SC, TX
Provisional	2nd S.	Montgomery	April 29, 1861	May 21, 1861	AL, FL, GA, LA, MS, SC, TX—VA, AR
Provisional	3rd S.	Richmond, Virginia	July 20, 1861	August 31, 1861	AL, FL, GA, LA, MS, SC, TX—VA, AR, NC, TN
Provisional	4th S.	Richmond	September 3, 1861	September 3, 1861	AL, FL, GA, LA, MS, SC, TX—VA, AR, NC, TN
Provisional	5th S.	Richmond	November 18, 1861	February 17, 1862	AL, FL, GA, LA, MS, SC, TX—VA, AR, NC, TN, MO, KY – AZ Terr.
1st Cong.	1st S.	Richmond	February 18, 1862	April 21, 1862	AL, FL, GA, LA, MS, SC, TX—VA, AR, NC, TN, MO, KY – AZ Terr., Cherokee Nation, Choctaw Nation
1st Cong.	2nd S.	Richmond	August 18, 1862	October 13, 1862	AL, FL, GA, LA, MS, SC, TX—VA, AR, NC, TN, MO, KY – AZ Terr., Cherokee Nation, Choctaw Nation
1st Cong.	3rd S.	Richmond	January 12, 1863	May 1, 1863	AL, FL, GA, LA, MS, SC, TX—VA, AR, NC, TN, MO, KY – AZ Terr., Cherokee Nation, Choctaw Nation
1st Cong.	4th S.	Richmond	December 7, 1863	February 18, 1864	AL, FL, GA, LA, MS, SC, TX—VA, AR, NC, TN, MO, KY – AZ Terr., Cherokee Nation, Choctaw Nation
2nd Cong.	1st S.	Richmond	May 2, 1864	June 14, 1864	AL, FL, GA, LA, MS, SC, TX—VA, AR, NC, TN, MO, KY – AZ Terr., Cherokee Nation, Choctaw Nation
2nd Cong.	2nd S.	Richmond	November 7, 1864	March 18, 1865	AL, FL, GA, LA, MS, SC, TX—VA, AR, NC, TN, MO, KY – AZ Terr., Cherokee Nation, Creek and Seminole Nations

== See also ==
- List of Confederate States senators

Preceded by Provisional Congress of the Confederate States	Confederate States Congress; February 18, 1862 – March 18, 1865	Constituency abolished
