= 1863 Confederate States House of Representatives elections =

Election in the confederate States in 1863

- May 1863 – November 1863

All 106 seats to the Confederate States House of Representatives 54 seats needed for a majority
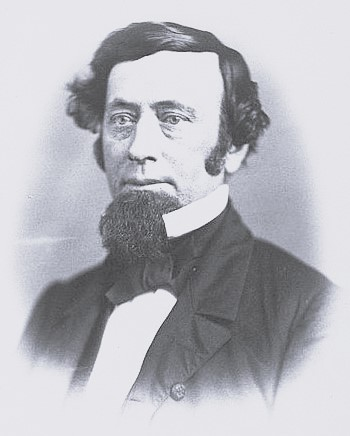

	First party	Second party
Leader	Thomas Bocock
Party	Pro-Administration	Anti-Administration
Leader's seat	Virginia 5th
Last election	80 seats	26 seats
Seats won	65	41
Seat change	▼15	▲15
- Results of the elections: New representative Incumbent re-elected
Speaker before election
Thomas Bocock
Pro-Administration
Elected Speaker
Thomas Bocock
Pro-Administration

Elections to the Confederate States Congress were held from May to November 1863, during what was intended to be the first of two midterms within President Jefferson Davis' six-year term. The number of members in the House of Representatives who openly opposed the policies of President Davis increased from 26 to 41 out of 106, while the number of anti-administration Senators went from 11 to 12. The pro-administration Senators thus had a narrow majority of two with 14 out of the 26 seats in the Confederate Senate. The 2nd Confederate States Congress would be seated on May 2, 1864.

== General election ==
The Confederate government did not have formal parties, and candidates ran individual campaigns. Nonetheless, some voters cast their ballots according to past party affiliations such as Democrat or Whig. The lack of parties was popularly believed to be a source of strength, however historians believe that the lack of such organizations prevented Davis from distributing patronage or commanding party loyalty from other elected officials to mobilize support for his policies. Despite this, historians have identified factions or proto-parties. One was largely supportive of President Davis's policies, or Pro-Administration, and the other was largely opposed to Davis' policies, or Anti-Administration. The Anti-Administration faction consisted of former Whigs as well as Fire-Eaters and other former Democrats.

Public grievances with the administration included supply shortages, inflation, and general financial mismanagement. Other issues that featured prominently in the elections were conscription and taxation. Anti-Administration candidates decried perceived federal government overreach, including Davis' decision to suspend habeas corpus and impose martial law. Pro-Administration officials attempted to appeal to the Confederate public's loyalty and foster a spirit of self-sacrifice for eventual independence of the Confederate States of America.

In the end, the Pro-Administration faction sustained electoral losses but maintained their majorities in both chambers of the Confederate Congress. Their strongest support came from Confederate soldiers and the Border States. However, this was not without anti-incumbent sentiment. For example, nine of the ten members of Georgia's Congressional delegation were defeated. In terms of policy, the overall sentiment of the Anti-Administration was in favor of the original secession and for continuing the American Civil War. Exceptions existed, as none of the newly elected Representatives from North Carolina had voted in favor of secession and five of those who won in North Carolina ran on peace platforms, while anti-secessionist former Whigs gained in Mississippi. Williamson Robert Winfield Cobb of Alabama was so openly in favor of peace that he was not seated by the Confederate Congress.

The elections were processed over six months due to the amount of Confederate territory occupied by the Union Army, in addition to all of the absentee ballots necessitated by the large refugee population. Alabama, Florida, Georgia, North Carolina, South Carolina, and Texas sent 32 of the 41 Anti-Administration Congressmen to the House. The majority wielded by the Confederate Congress would not have been possible without the near unified support from the occupied districts. The results of the 1863 election indicating waning public confidence in the Davis administration, and enhanced the political strength of dissenters within the Confederacy.
