= Charles Didier Dreux =

American soldier

Charles Dreux
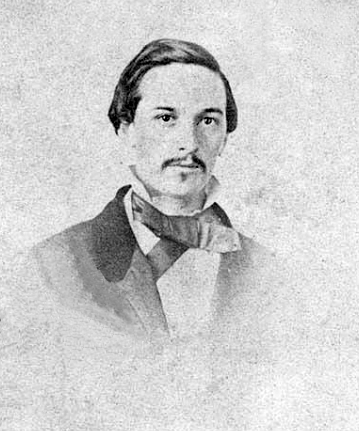
- Born: May 11, 1832; New Orleans, Louisiana
- Died: July 5, 1861 (aged 29) Newport News, Virginia
- Allegiance: Confederate States
- Branch: Confederate States Army
- Service years: 1861
- Rank: Lieutenant colonel
- Commands: 1st Louisiana Infantry
- Conflicts: American Civil War; Skirmish at Smith's Farm †

Charles Didier Dreux (May 11, 1832 – July 5, 1861) was an American lawyer and soldier known for being the first Confederate field officer killed during the American Civil War.

== Biography ==
He was the son of Guy Dreux and Léontine Arnoult. Prior to the Civil War, Dreux had served as district attorney and a member of the Louisiana state legislature. 30,000 mourners attended his funeral in New Orleans. He is buried in Metairie Cemetery. According to Grace King, those who knew him described him "as a man of great personal magnetism; brilliant, eloquent, dashing." He left for the battlefield as lieutenant colonel of the Louisiana Guard Battalion, in command of Dreux's (1st) Battalion, composed of the first five companies that volunteered from Louisiana. Three months later, he died at Young's Mill (Warwick, Virginia, now Newport News, Virginia) during the Skirmish at Smith's Farm. His last words were "Steady, boys! Steady!”

== Honors ==
An Elegy on the Death of Lt. Col. Chas. Dreux, words by James R. Randall and music by G. M. Loening, was published in New Orleans in 1861. A monument to Dreux is located in New Orleans at the intersection of Canal Street and South Jefferson Davis Parkway. The text on the monument reads:

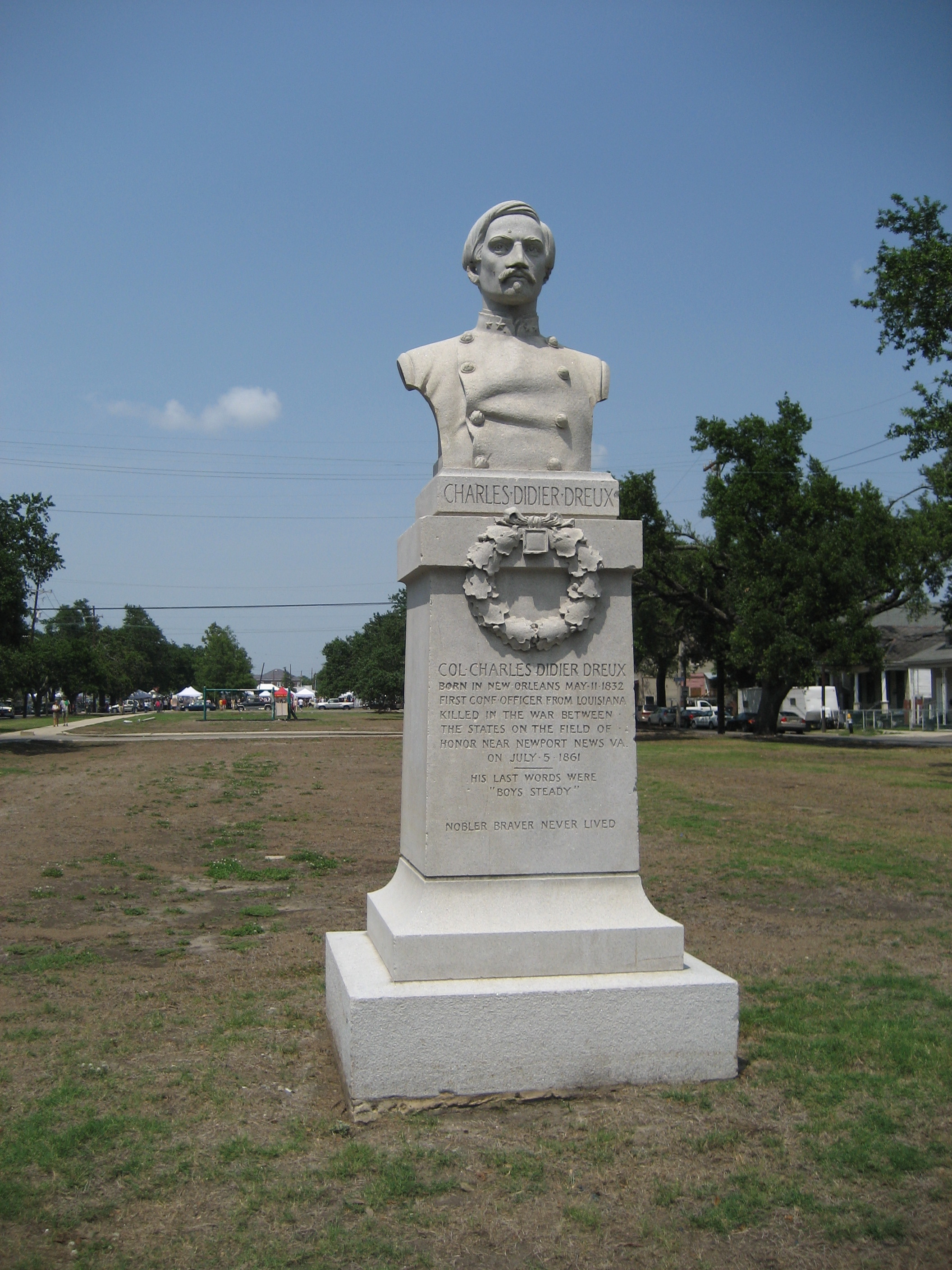
Monument in New Orleans in 2007

Col. Charles Didier Dreux
Born in New Orleans May 11, 1832
First Con. Officer from Louisiana
killed in the War between
the States on the field of
honor near Newport News Va.
on July 5, 1861
His last words were
"Boys steady"
Nobler braver never lived

Vandalism to the statue includes having its nose was chiseled off in 2017, being covered in a white hood and spray-painted with obscenities in 2018, and being pulled down in 2020.
