= Henry Marshall (Louisiana politician) =

American politician

Deputy from Louisiana to the Provisional Congress of the Confederate States
- In office February 4, 1861 – February 17, 1862
- Preceded by: New constituency
- Succeeded by: Constituency abolished

Personal details
- Born: December 28, 1805 Darlington District, South Carolina
- Died: July 13, 1864 (aged 58) DeSoto Parish, Louisiana
- Resting place: Trinity Episcopal Cemetery, DeSoto Parish, Louisiana
- Spouse: Maria Harriet Taylor (m. 1832)
- Children: 9

Henry Marshall (December 28, 1805 – July 13, 1864) was an American politician who served as a Deputy from Louisiana to the Provisional Congress of the Confederate States from 1861 to 1862.

== Antebellum period ==
Henry Marshall was born in Darlington District, South Carolina on December 28, 1805. He was a cousin of future Confederate general Maxcy Gregg and attended Union College at Schenectady, New York. While a student there, Marshall walked from Philadelphia to his home in Society Hill, leaving a diary of the journey. He moved to Louisiana in the mid-1830s to seek cheap land in the west, and settled in DeSoto Parish. There, Marshall became a planter, owning 8,000 acres of land and 201 slaves with property valued at over $200,000 (~$5.68 million in 2024) by 1860, making him extremely wealthy by contemporary standards. He also served as a member of the Louisiana State Senate.

== American Civil War ==
In January 1861, Marshall signed the state secession ordinance. He soon defeated Benjamin Lewis Hodge for election as a delegate to the Montgomery Constitutional Convention that became the Provisional Congress by eight votes. In November he narrowly won a contest for reelection to the 1st Confederate Congress. During this period he funded a South Carolina regiment organized by Gregg.

In the Confederate Congress, Marshall served as chairman of the Committee on Public Lands. An extreme advocate of states' rights, he refused to moderate his views despite the conditions of the war, unlike other Louisiana congressmen, and in contrast to the latter was reluctant to grant President Jefferson Davis new powers. Marshall opposed direct taxation and federal control over commerce and transport and desired to man the army through state levies rather than central government conscription and give states control of the appointment of officers and service exemptions.

Possibly because his views were not in accord with the war situation, Marshall declined to run for reelection in 1863 and retired to his plantation, Land's End, where he died on July 13, 1864. He was buried in Trinity Cemetery near Gloster, Louisiana.
