= Florida State Road 727 =

State highway in Florida, United States

State Road 727
- West Fairfield Drive; South Fairfield Drive

Route information
- Maintained by FDOT
- Length: 6.755 mi (10.871 km)

Major junctions
- South end: SR 292 in Beach Haven
- US 98 near Myrtle Grove; US 90 in West Pensacola
- North end: SR 295 in West Pensacola

Location
- Country: United States
- State: Florida
- Counties: Escambia

Highway system
- Florida State Highway System; Interstate; US; State; Former; Pre‑1945; Toll; Scenic
← SR 717	→ SR 729

State Road 727 (SR 727) is a 6.755-mile-long (10.871 km) state highway in the Pensacola metropolitan area. It is one of four "misnumbered" state road 7xx highways in the Pensacola area. It is locally known as West Fairfield Drive and South Fairfield Drive. Its southern terminus is at an intersection with SR 292 (Gulf Beach Highway). Its northern terminus is an intersection with SR 295 (New Warrington Road) in West Pensacola. From the eastern terminus, Fairfield Drive continues eastward with the SR 295 designation until SR 289 (Ninth Avenue) in Pensacola. Until the mid-1990s, the route was designated State Road 289A.

Like SR 295 and the nearby SR 296, SR 298, and SR 742, SR 727 is primarily a bypass route for Pensacola. Motorists traveling near the Gulf of Mexico shore west of Pensacola often use Fairfield Drive to avoid the downtown section and continue eastward via Interstate 110 (I-110; SR 8A) to I-10 (SR 8) and then crossing Escambia Bay on the Interstate highway.

== Major intersections ==
The entire route is in Escambia County.

Location	mi	km	Destinations	Notes
Beach Haven	0.000	0.000	SR 292 (Gulf Beach Highway)	
	1.638	2.636	US 98 (SR 30)	
Myrtle Grove	2.754	4.432	West Jackson Street (CR 298A east)	
Myrtle Grove	3.010	4.844	SR 298 (Lillian Highway)	
West Pensacola	5.951	9.577	US 90 (Mobile Highway / SR 10A)	
West Pensacola	6.755	10.871	SR 295 north (Fairfield Drive)	interchange
1.000 mi = 1.609 km; 1.000 km = 0.621 mi
