= Florida State Road 298 =

State highway in Florida, United States

State Road 298
- SR 298 in red, CR 298A in blue

Route information
- Maintained by FDOT
- Length: 6.837 mi (11.003 km)

Major junctions
- West end: US 98 / CR 297 in Millview
- SR 727 in Myrtle Grove
- East end: SR 295 in West Pensacola

Location
- Country: United States
- State: Florida
- Counties: Escambia

Highway system
- Florida State Highway System; Interstate; US; State; Former; Pre‑1945; Toll; Scenic
← SR 297	→ SR 300

State Road 298 (SR 298), known locally as Lillian Highway, is a mostly east–west thoroughfare in Pensacola, Florida. It runs from its intersection with U.S. Highway 98 (US 98 or SR 30) and Dog Track Road, skirting Perdido Bay on its way east to its terminus at the West Pensacola spur of SR 295. SR 298 passes under the mainline of SR 295 without an interchange. It serves as a major route through the communities of Myrtle Grove and West Pensacola.

== Major intersections ==
The entire route is in Escambia County.

Location	mi	km	Destinations	Notes
Millview	0.000	0.000	US 98 (Lillian Highway / SR 30) / CR 297 south (Dog Track Road)	
Sand Cut	3.335	5.367	SR 173 (N Blue Angel Parkway) – Naval Aviation Museum, NAS Pensacola	
Myrtle Grove	4.018	6.466	SR 727 (Fairfield Drive)	
West Pensacola	6.837	11.003	SR 295 (North New Warrington Road)	
1.000 mi = 1.609 km; 1.000 km = 0.621 mi

== Related route ==
County Road 298A
- Location: Escambia County
- Length: 4.554 mi (7.329 km)

County Road 298A (CR 298A, also known as West Jackson Street) is a county road in Escambia County. From the mid 1950s through the late 1970s/early 1980s, it was part of State Road 298A. It is an alternate route to SR 298 running between SR 727 (N Fairfield Drive), two blocks south of SR 298, and US 98/SR 292. It is approximately 4.6 miles (7.4 km) long, passing the western suburbs, Myrtle Grove, West Pensacola, and Brownsville. The entire road is only two lanes wide.

While the road was part of the state highway system, it extended north along Fairfield Drive to return to SR 298. By 1981, the road had been removed from the state highway system and became part of CR 298A. Through the late 2010s, CR 298A was extended further east to end at US 29/SR 95 (N Palafox Street) in downtown Pensacola.
