= Florida State Road 290 =

State highway in Florida, United States

State Road 290
- Olive Road
- SR 290 highlighted in red

Route information
- Maintained by FDOT
- Length: 5.48 mi (8.82 km)

Major junctions
- West end: CR 95A in Ensley
- SR 291 in Ferry Pass
- East end: US 90 at Escambia Bay

Location
- Country: United States
- State: Florida

Highway system
- Florida State Highway System; Interstate; US; State; Former; Pre‑1945; Toll; Scenic
← SR 289	→ SR 291

State Road 290, known locally as East Olive Road, was a major thoroughfare in Pensacola, Florida. It ran from County Road 95A (Old Palafox Road) in the Ensley community east to U.S. Route 90 (Scenic Highway) at Escambia Bay. The road served as the primary east–west route through the Ferry Pass community. The road was converted to a County Road in 2011. (Escambia County Road 290) Unlike nearby SR 99, was never changed back to a state highway.

== Route description ==
State Road 290 began at an intersection with County Road 95A (Old Palafox Road) in the Ensley neighborhood of Pensacola, Florida. The route progressed northeastward through a mix of residential and commercial neighborhoods as East Olive Road; it crossed over a nearby freight line. At the intersection with Oak Forest Drive, State Road 290 became surrounded by housing complexes. This continued for a distance as the highway made a slight bend to the east until Whitmere Drive, where State Road 290 entered a commercial neighborhood once again. Just after the change, the two-lane highway became five lanes and intersected with State Road 291 (Davis Highway) in Ferry Pass. State Road 290 continued eastward, passing a local strip mall and entered a residential neighborhood just east of Davis Highway.

State Road 290 continued eastward through Ferry Pass as a two-lane highway; it passed several more condominium complexes and a local track. After the intersection with Ridgefield Road, the highway gradually curved to the northeast and intersected with the northern terminus of State Road 289 (North 9th Avenue). After State Road 289, State Road 290 became three lanes for a short distance, until it reverted to two lanes at Northpointe Boulevard. Continuing through a nearby residential neighborhood, it reverted to three lanes once again and curved once more to the intersection with U.S. Route 90 (Scenic Highway, State Road 10A) on the shore of Escambia Bay.

== Major intersections ==
The entire route was in Escambia County.

Location	mi	km	Destinations	Notes
Ensley	0.00	0.00	CR 95A (Old Palafox Road)	Western terminus of State Road 290
Ferry Pass	2.42	3.89	SR 291 (Davis Highway)	
Ferry Pass	4.54	7.31	SR 289 (North 9th Avenue)	Northern terminus of State Road 289
Escambia Bay	5.48	8.82	US 90 (Scenic Highway / SR 10A)	Eastern terminus of State Road 290
1.000 mi = 1.609 km; 1.000 km = 0.621 mi
