= Florida State Road 750 =

State highway in Florida, United States

State Road 750
- Airport Boulevard

Route information
- Maintained by FDOT
- Length: 3.273 mi (5.267 km)

Major junctions
- West end: US 29 in Brent
- I-110 in Brent SR 291 in Pensacola SR 289 in Pensacola
- East end: Pensacola International Airport

Location
- Country: United States
- State: Florida
- Counties: Escambia

Highway system
- Florida State Highway System; Interstate; US; State; Former; Pre‑1945; Toll; Scenic
| ← SR 742 | → SR 752 |

Locally known as Airport Boulevard, State Road 750 (SR 750) is a 3.3-mile-long (5.3 km) spur from Ninth Avenue in Pensacola to the entrance of Pensacola International Airport. The western terminus is an intersection with Pensacola Boulevard (U.S. Route 29 or US 29 and SR 95).

Since the state of Florida renumbered its Florida State Roads in 1945, a grid system of designation was imposed. While Pensacola is in a region of Florida in which all three-digit State Roads should begin with a "1" or "2", its collection of State Roads has a few that begin with a "7" (usually used near Sarasota or Stuart, both over 400 miles (640 km) away).

== Major intersections ==
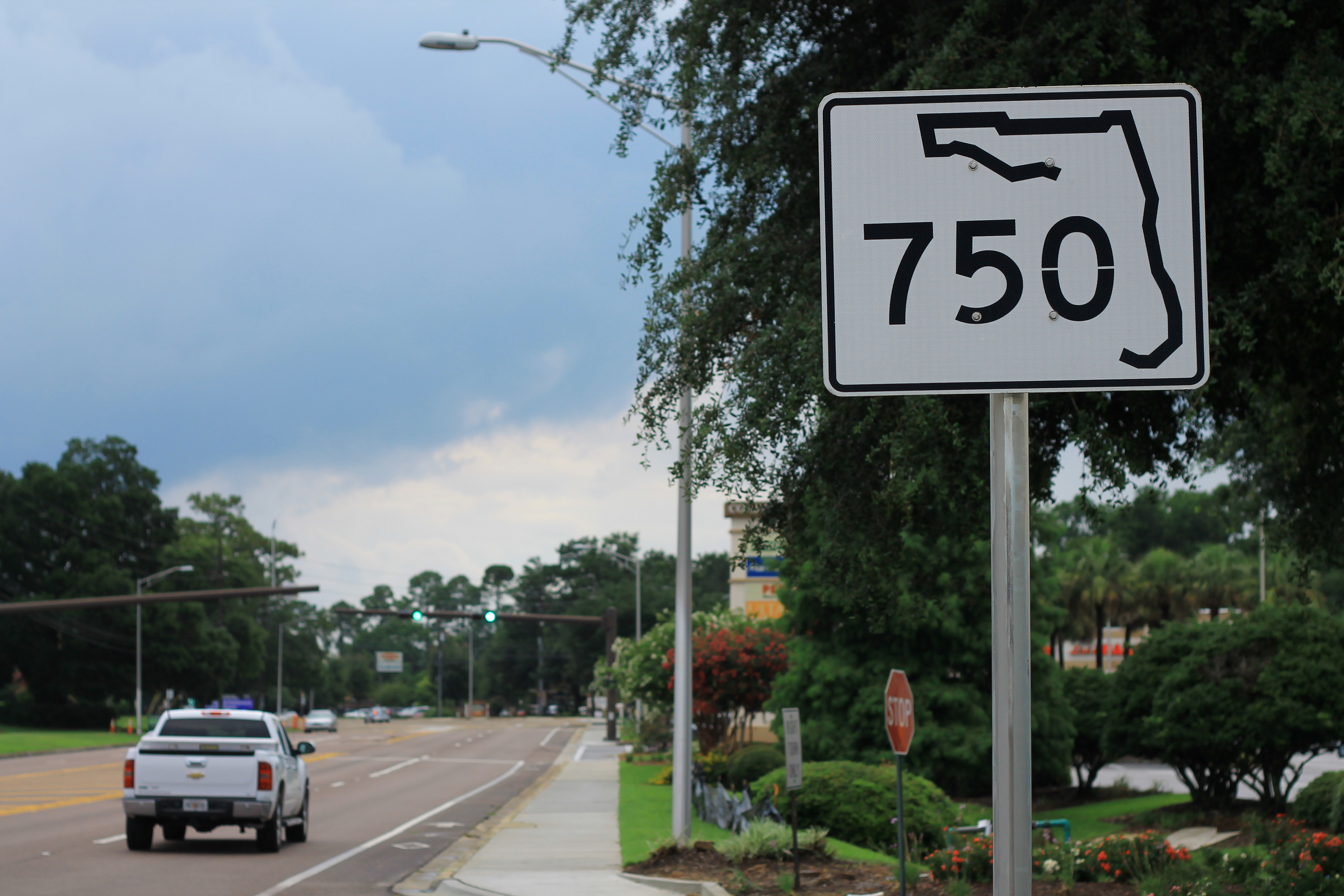
A sign denoting SR 750 located in Pensacola.

The entire route is in Escambia County.

| Location | mi | km | Destinations | Notes |
|---|---|---|---|---|
| Brent | 0.000 | 0.000 | US 29 (Pensacola Boulevard / SR 95) | |
| Brent | 0.187 | 0.301 | CR 95A (North Palafox Street) | |
| Brent | 1.113– 1.240 | 1.791– 1.996 | I-110 (SR 8A) to I-10 – Pensacola Beach | I-110 exit 5 |
| Pensacola | 1.606 | 2.585 | SR 291 (Davis Highway) | |
| Pensacola | 2.691 | 4.331 | SR 289 (9th Avenue) | |
| Pensacola | 3.273 | 5.267 | North 12th Avenue / Airport Boulevard - Pensacola International Airport | |
1.000 mi = 1.609 km; 1.000 km = 0.621 mi
