= Florida State Road 295 =

Highway in Florida

State Road 295
- SR 295 in red, SR 295 Spur in blue, SR 752 in purple

Route information
- Maintained by FDOT
- Length: 7.992 mi (12.862 km)

Major junctions
- South end: Naval Air Station Pensacola
- US 98 in West Pensacola; US 90 in West Pensacola; US 29 in Pensacola; I-110 in Pensacola
- North end: SR 289 in Pensacola

Location
- Country: United States
- State: Florida
- Counties: Escambia

Highway system
- Florida State Highway System; Interstate; US; State; Former; Pre‑1945; Toll; Scenic
← I-295	→ SR 296
← SR 750	→ SR 758

State Road 295 (SR 295) is a major highway in the Pensacola metropolitan area. Locally, SR 295 is also called Navy Boulevard, New Warrington Road, and Fairfield Drive. The southern terminus is at the entrance to Pensacola Naval Air Station, and the northern terminus is at an intersection with Fairfield Drive, Ninth Avenue (SR 289) and 12th Avenue in the city of Pensacola. This roadway is the main artery between southwestern Escambia County and the city of Pensacola.

== Major intersections ==
The entire route is in Escambia County.

Location	mi	km	Destinations	Notes
Warrington	0.000	0.000	Naval Air Station Pensacola	
Warrington	0.956	1.539	SR 292 (Gulf Beach Highway) – truck route to NAS Pensacola, Gulf Islands National Seashore Perdido Key	
West Pensacola	1.689	2.718	US 98 west (SR 30) – Mobile, Dog Track, Naval Hospital Pensacola, Navy Shopping Mall	South end of US 98 / SR 30 overlap
West Pensacola	2.054	3.306	US 98 east (Navy Boulevard / SR 30)	North end of US 98 / SR 30 overlap
West Pensacola	2.299	3.700	SR 294 east (Chiefs' Way)	
West Pensacola	3.042	4.896	Jackson Street (CR 298A)	
West Pensacola	3.364	5.414	To US 90 east (Cervantes Street) / New Warrington Road	Spur of SR 295
West Pensacola	3.98	6.41	US 90 west (Mobile Highway / SR 10A)	interchange; northbound exit and southbound entrance
West Pensacola	3.98	6.41	US 90 east (Cervantes Street / SR 10A)	interchange; southbound exit and northbound entrance
West Pensacola	4.704	7.570	SR 727 south (West Fairfield Drive)	interchange; southbound exit and northbound entrance
West Pensacola	5.725	9.213	CR 453 (North W Street)	
West Pensacola	5.929	9.542	North T Street (CR 493 south)	
Goulding	8.313	13.378	SR 292 (North Pace Boulevard)	
Goulding	6.724	10.821	SR 752 east (West Texar Drive)	northbound exit and southbound entrance
Pensacola	6.957	11.196	US 29 (North Palafox Street / SR 95)	
Pensacola	7.51	12.09	I-110 (SR 8A) to I-10 – Pensacola Beach	I-110 exit 4
Pensacola	7.596	12.225	SR 291 (Davis Highway) to I-110 north / I-10	
Pensacola	7.992	12.862	SR 289 (9th Avenue) – Airport	
1.000 mi = 1.609 km; 1.000 km = 0.621 mi: Concurrency terminus

== Related routes ==
=== West Pensacola spur ===
State Road 295 Spur
- Location: West Pensacola

A spur on New Warrington Road in West Pensacola is also signed as SR 295. The spur is designed as a connection from northbound SR 295 and to southbound SR 295 to US 90.

The entire route is in West Pensacola, Escambia County.

mi	km	Destinations	Notes
0.000	0.000	SR 295 (New Warrington Road)	
0.326	0.525	SR 298 west (Lillian Highway)	
0.423	0.681	North Old Corry Field Road (CR 295A south)	
0.482	0.776	US 90 (Mobile Highway / SR 10A)	
1.000 mi = 1.609 km; 1.000 km = 0.621 mi

=== State Road 752 ===
State Road 752
- Location: Pensacola

A one-mile-long spur from SR 295 (along Texar Drive) to Ninth Avenue is signed east–west as State Road 752. While SR 295 has a diamond interchange with Interstate 110 (I-110), SR 752 does not connect with the Interstate highway at all.

The entire route is in Escambia County.

Location	mi	km	Destinations	Notes
Goulding	0.000	0.000	SR 295 south (West Fairfield Drive)	
Goulding	0.207	0.333	CR 443 south (E Street)	
Pensacola	0.294	0.473	US 29 (Palafox Street / SR 95)	
Pensacola	0.926	1.490	SR 291 south (Dr. Martin Luther King Jr. Drive)	
Pensacola	1.000	1.609	SR 291 north (Davis Highway)	
Pensacola	1.182	1.902	SR 289 (North 9th Avenue)	
1.000 mi = 1.609 km; 1.000 km = 0.621 mi

Browse numbered routes
← SR 750	SR 752	→ SR 754
