= Florida State Road 289 =

State highway in Florida, United States

State Road 289
- North 9th Avenue

Route information
- Maintained by FDOT
- Length: 7.281 mi (11.718 km)

Major junctions
- South end: US 98 / US 98 Bus. in Pensacola
- North end: CR 290 in Ferry Pass

Location
- Country: United States
- State: Florida
- Counties: Escambia

Highway system
- Florida State Highway System; Interstate; US; State; Former; Pre‑1945; Toll; Scenic
| ← SR 285 | → SR 291 |

State Road 289 (SR 289), known locally as North 9th Avenue, is a north–south major thoroughfare in Pensacola, Florida.

== Route description ==
SR 289 begins at U.S. Route 98 (US 98), US 98 Business (US 98 Bus.), and unsigned SR 30 in Pensacola, east of the Pensacola Bay Center. At this point, US 98 Bus. and SR 30 head west and US 98 and SR 30 head east on the one-way pair of East Chase Street eastbound and East Gregory Street westbound. The southern terminus of SR 289 also serves as the eastern terminus of US 98 Bus. From here, SR 289 heads north as an unsigned highway that is concurrent with US 98 on four-lane undivided North 9th Avenue. The road passes through commercial areas, crossing a CSX railroad line. North 9th Avenue continues past homes and businesses, reaching an intersection with US 90/SR 10A, where US 98 turns west on that road and SR 289 continues north signed. SR 289 heads through more of Pensacola, intersecting the eastern terminus of SR 752 before crossing SR 295.

The roadway runs through residential neighborhoods before entering the primary commercial corridor for northeast Pensacola and intersecting SR 296. The road passes between Sacred Heart Hospital to the west and Cordova Mall to the east before crossing SR 750/CR 750. SR 289 gains a center left-turn lane and passes to the west of Pensacola State College as it heads through areas of homes and businesses, entering Ferry Pass. The highway passes a field to the north of Pensacola International Airport before it crosses back into Pensacola and comes to the intersection with SR 742. SR 289 passes more development and curves to the north, coming to a bridge over Interstate 10 (I-10)/SR 8 without an interchange. After this, SR 289 runs through residential areas as a four-lane divided highway and reaches its northern terminus at an intersection with SR 290 on the border of Pensacola and Ferry Pass.

== Major intersections ==
The entire route is in Escambia County.

| Location | mi | km | Destinations | Notes |
|---|---|---|---|---|
| Pensacola | 0.000 | 0.000 | US 98 east (East Chase Street / SR 30) – Gulf Breeze, Panama City, Port truck route | Southern terminus, south end of US 98 overlap (eastbound/southbound) |
| Pensacola | 0.083 | 0.134 | US 98 Bus. west (East Gregory Street / SR 30) to I-110 | South end of US 98 overlap (westbound/northbound) |
| Pensacola | 0.496 | 0.798 | US 90 / US 98 west (East Cervantes Street / SR 10A) to I-110 | North end of US 98 overlap |
| Pensacola | 2.211 | 3.558 | SR 752 west (Texar Drive) | |
| Pensacola | 2.707 | 4.356 | SR 295 south (East Fairfield Drive) | |
| Pensacola | 4.025 | 6.478 | SR 296 (Bayou Boulevard) to I-10 / I-110 | |
| Pensacola | 4.548 | 7.319 | SR 750 (Airport Boulevard) – Airport | |
| Pensacola | 6.053 | 9.741 | SR 742 (Creighton Road) | |
| Ferry Pass | 7.281 | 11.718 | CR 290 (Olive Road) | Northern terminus |
1.000 mi = 1.609 km; 1.000 km = 0.621 mi: Concurrency terminus
