= Florida State Road 294 =

State highway in Florida, United States

State Road 294
- Chiefs Way

Route information
- Maintained by FDOT
- Length: 0.209 mi (336 m)

Major junctions
- West end: SR 295 in West Pensacola
- East end: US 98 in West Pensacola

Location
- Country: United States
- State: Florida
- Counties: Escambia

Highway system
- Florida State Highway System; Interstate; US; State; Former; Pre‑1945; Toll; Scenic
← SR 293	→ I-295

State Road 294 (SR 294) is a very short state highway that connects State Road 295 and U.S. Highway 98 (US 98) on Chiefs Way in West Pensacola, Florida.

== Route description ==
SR 294 begins at an intersection with New Warrington Road, which carries SR 295 north and south. SR 294 heads east along Chiefs Way, a two-lane street which serves local businesses. It intersects Old Corry Field Road (County Road 295A) near its eastern end. An intersection with US 98, along Navy Boulevard, marks the end of SR 294. The route is one-fifth mile (0.32 km) in length.

== Major intersections ==
The entire route is in West Pensacola, Escambia County.

mi	km	Destinations	Notes
0.000	0.000	SR 295 (New Warrington Road)	
0.135	0.217	Old Corry Field Road (CR 295A)	
0.209	0.336	US 98 (North Navy Boulevard / SR 30)	
1.000 mi = 1.609 km; 1.000 km = 0.621 mi
