= Florida State Road 291 =

State highway in Florida, United States

State Road 291
- Davis Street, Davis Highway

Route information
- Maintained by FDOT
- Length: 8.917 mi (14.351 km)

Major junctions
- South end: US 98 Bus. in Pensacola
- I-110 in Pensacola; I-10 in Ferry Pass
- North end: US 90 Alt. in Ferry Pass

Location
- Country: United States
- State: Florida
- Counties: Escambia

Highway system
- Florida State Highway System; Interstate; US; State; Former; Pre‑1945; Toll; Scenic
← SR 289	→ SR 292

State Road 291 (SR 291) is a major thoroughfare in the Pensacola, Florida metropolitan area. Locally, it is known as Davis Street and Davis Highway. It runs from Wright Street in downtown Pensacola north to its terminus at Nine Mile Road (U.S. Highway 90 Alternate or US 90 Alt.) near the University of West Florida. Between Fairfield Drive (State Road 295) and University Parkway, Davis is one of the city's major commercial strips. Near its intersection with Interstate 10 (I-10) lies University Mall.

For a time at least during the early 1950s, US 90 was routed along SR 291 north of Cervantes Street.

== Major intersections ==
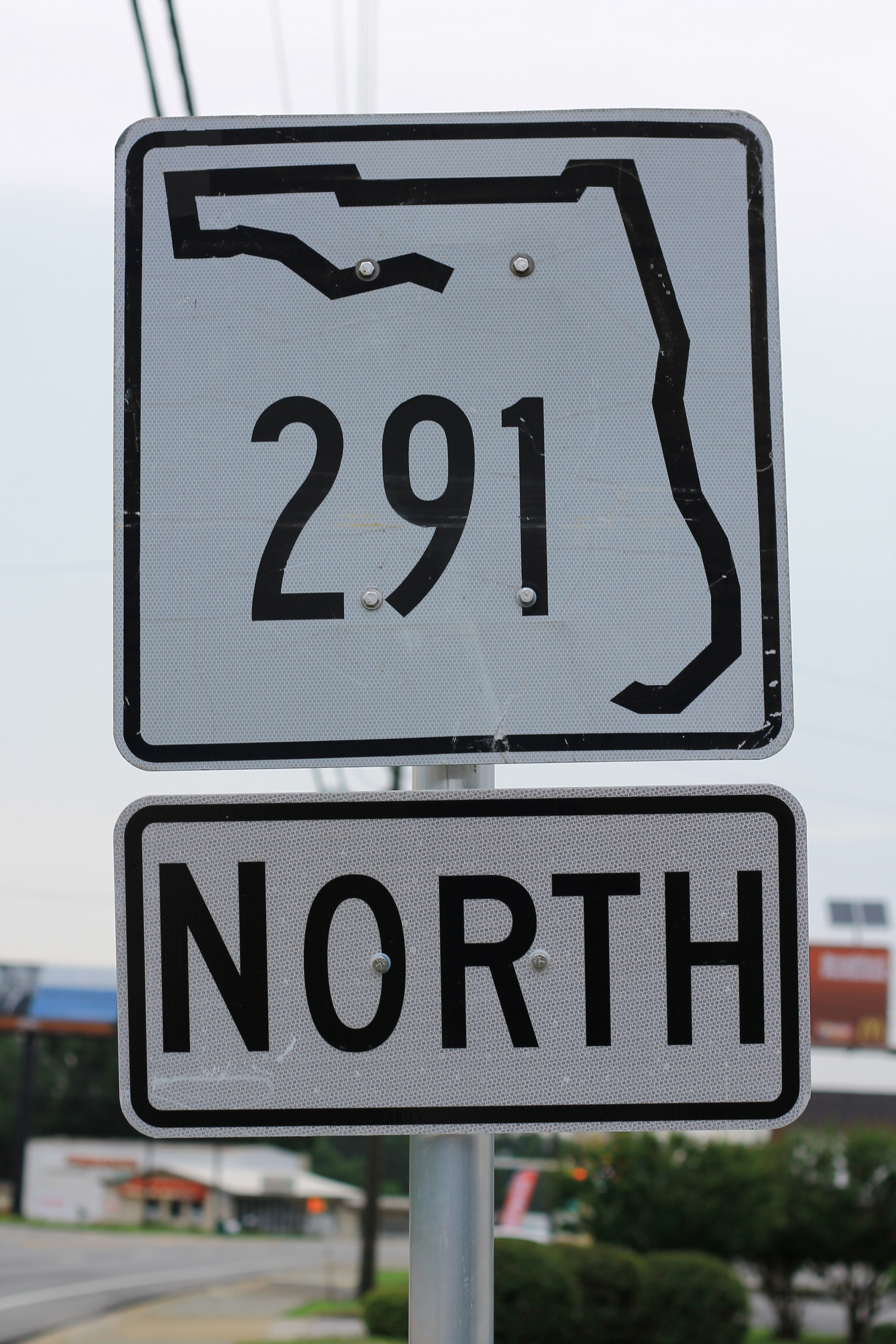
A sign denoting SR 291 located in Pensacola.

The entire route is in Escambia County.

Location	mi	km	Destinations	Notes
Pensacola	0.000	0.000	US 98 Bus. (North Alcaniz Street / W.D. Childers Plaza / SR 30)	
Pensacola	0.114	0.183	To I-110 / East Gregory Street	
Pensacola	0.559	0.900	US 90 / US 98 (East Cervantes Street / SR 10A) to I-110	
Pensacola	2.281	3.671	SR 752 (Texar Drive)	
Pensacola	2.678	4.310	I-110 north (SR 8A) to I-10	I-110 exit 4
Pensacola	2.800	4.506	SR 295 (Fairfield Drive) to I-110	
Brent	4.288	6.901	SR 296 (Brent Lane) to I-110 – Airport	
Pensacola	4.854	7.812	SR 750 (Airport Boulevard) – Airport	
Ferry Pass	5.889	9.477	SR 742 (Creighton Road)	
Ferry Pass	6.42	10.33	I-10 (SR 8) to I-110 – Mobile, Tallahassee	I-10 exit 13
Ferry Pass	6.883	11.077	CR 290 (Olive Road)	
Ferry Pass	8.405	13.527	Copter Road (CR 498)	
Ferry Pass	8.917	14.351	US 90 Alt. (SR 10) – Mobile, Milton	interchange
1.000 mi = 1.609 km; 1.000 km = 0.621 mi
