= Florida State Road 742 =

State highway in Florida, United States

State Road 742
- Burgess Road; Creighton Road

Route information
- Maintained by FDOT
- Length: 6.886 mi (11.082 km)

Major junctions
- West end: US 29 in Brent
- SR 291 in Ferry Pass SR 289 in Pensacola
- East end: US 90 in Pensacola

Location
- Country: United States
- State: Florida
- Counties: Escambia

Highway system
- Florida State Highway System; Interstate; US; State; Former; Pre‑1945; Toll; Scenic
← SR 739	→ SR 750

State Road 742 (SR 742) is a 6.886-mile-long (11.082 km) east–west state highway serving Pensacola, Florida. It is both a commuter road and a bypass route that also provides access (via Ninth Avenue/SR 289 and Airport Boulevard/SR 750) for motorists to Pensacola International Airport. Locally known as Burgess Road and Creighton Road, SR 742 stays within a mile south of Interstate 10 (I-10 or SR 8) from the state road's western terminus at U.S. Route 29 (US 29 or SR 95) near Ensley to SR 742's eastern terminus at US 90 in Pensacola.

SR 742 east of SR 289 was itself part of SR 289 until the mid-1970s.

Since the state of Florida renumbered its Florida State Roads in 1945, a grid system of designation was imposed. While Pensacola is in a region of Florida in which all three-digit State Roads should begin with a "1" or "2", its collection of State Roads has a few that begin with a "7" (usually used near Sarasota or Stuart, both over 400 miles (640 km) away).

== Major intersections ==
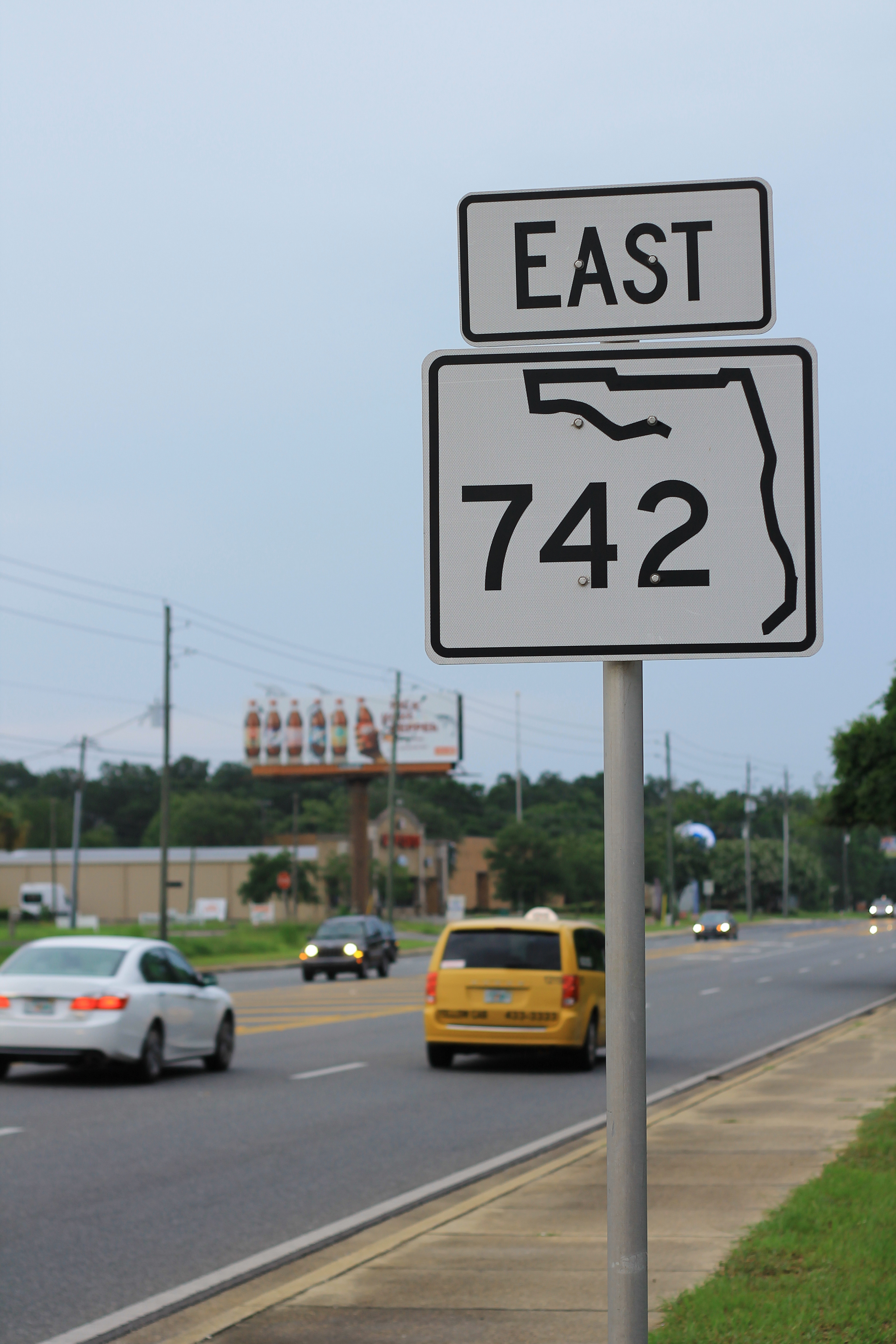
A sign denoting Florida State Road 742, located in Pensacola.

The entire route is in Escambia County.

Location	mi	km	Destinations	Notes
Brent	0.000	0.000	US 29 (Pensacola Boulevard / SR 95)	
Brent	0.576	0.927	CR 95A (North Palafox Street)	
Ferry Pass	2.661	4.282	SR 291 (North Davis Highway)	
Pensacola	4.599	7.401	SR 289 (North 9th Avenue)	
Pensacola	6.886	11.082	US 90 (Scenic Highway / SR 10A)	
1.000 mi = 1.609 km; 1.000 km = 0.621 mi
