= Interstate 110 (Florida) =

Highway in Florida

Interstate 110
- I-110 highlighted in red

Route information
- Auxiliary route of I-10
- Maintained by FDOT
- Length: 6.341 mi (10.205 km)
- Existed: 1965–present
- NHS: Entire route

Major junctions
- South end: US 98 in Pensacola
- US 90 in Pensacola
- North end: I-10 near Ferry Pass

Location
- Country: United States
- State: Florida
- Counties: Escambia

Highway system
- Interstate Highway System; Main; Auxiliary; Suffixed; Business; Future; Florida State Highway System; Interstate; US; State; Former; Pre‑1945; Toll; Scenic
← SR 109	→ SR 111
← SR 8	SR 8A	→ SR 9

Interstate 110 (I-110) is a 6.341-mile (10.205 km) auxiliary route of the Interstate Highway System in Pensacola, Florida, extending north from U.S. Route 98 (US 98) to I-10. I-110 carries the hidden Florida Department of Transportation designation of State Road 8A. The easternmost auxiliary route of I-10 and the only auxiliary route of I-10 in Florida, it is also known as the Reubin O'Donovan Askew Parkway in honor of the former governor of Florida who originated in Pensacola.

== Route description ==
I-110 consists of six interchanges. Unlike most Florida Interstates, it retained its sequential exit numbering system when others switched to a mile-log system.

The freeway begins at exits 1A through 1C, composing a directional T interchange that connects I-110 to Gregory Street, Chase Street (US 98), and Garden Street (US 98 Business) adjacent to the Pensacola Bay Center. Exit 2, 0.5 miles (0.80 km) north, links I-110 to Cervantes Street (US 90/US 98) via a southbound exit and northbound entrance. Exit 3, one further mile (1.6 km) north, consists of a southbound exit and northbound entrance to and from Maxwell and Jordan Streets. I-110 is elevated on separate viaducts for northbound and southbound lanes throughout this initial 2.4-mile (3.9 km) span through downtown Pensacola.

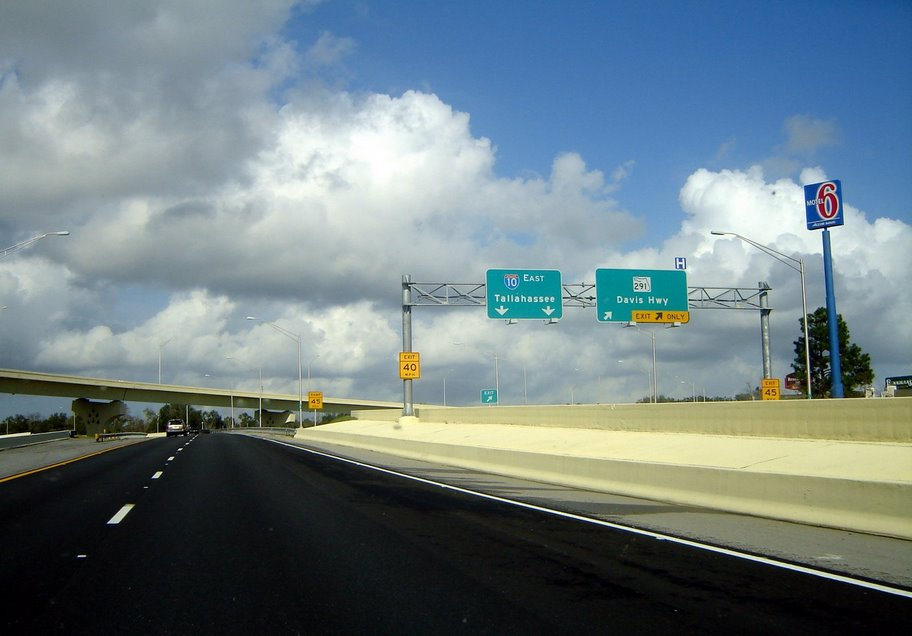
I-110 near its terminus at I-10, featuring representations of the Blue Angels on the flyover supports

North of exit 3, the freeway is built at-grade, and there are two modified diamond interchanges. The first is exit 4, leading to Fairfield Drive (SR 295). Both northbound ramps of exit 4 are located in the southeast quadrant of the intersection and directly connect to Davis Highway (SR 291). Approximately 1.5 miles (2.4 km) north is exit 5, an interchange with Brent Lane (SR 296) and Airport Boulevard (SR 750).

I-110's northern terminus is at I-10. There is a modified trumpet/semi-directional T interchange at this location with additional direct connections to SR 291.

== History ==
I-110 was completed between I-10 and SR 295/Fairfield Drive by 1965. An extension south to Maxwell Street was completed in 1969. In 1978, I-110 was further extended south to its current terminus in Downtown Pensacola. The original freeway was four lanes for its entirety and connected to I-10 via an unmodified trumpet interchange.

In the 1990s, there was official discussion of extending I-110 north to US 90 Alternate (Nine Mile Road) and possibly as far as I-65 in southwestern Alabama. However, political and financial hurdles stalled serious consideration of the project. The link was later cancelled.

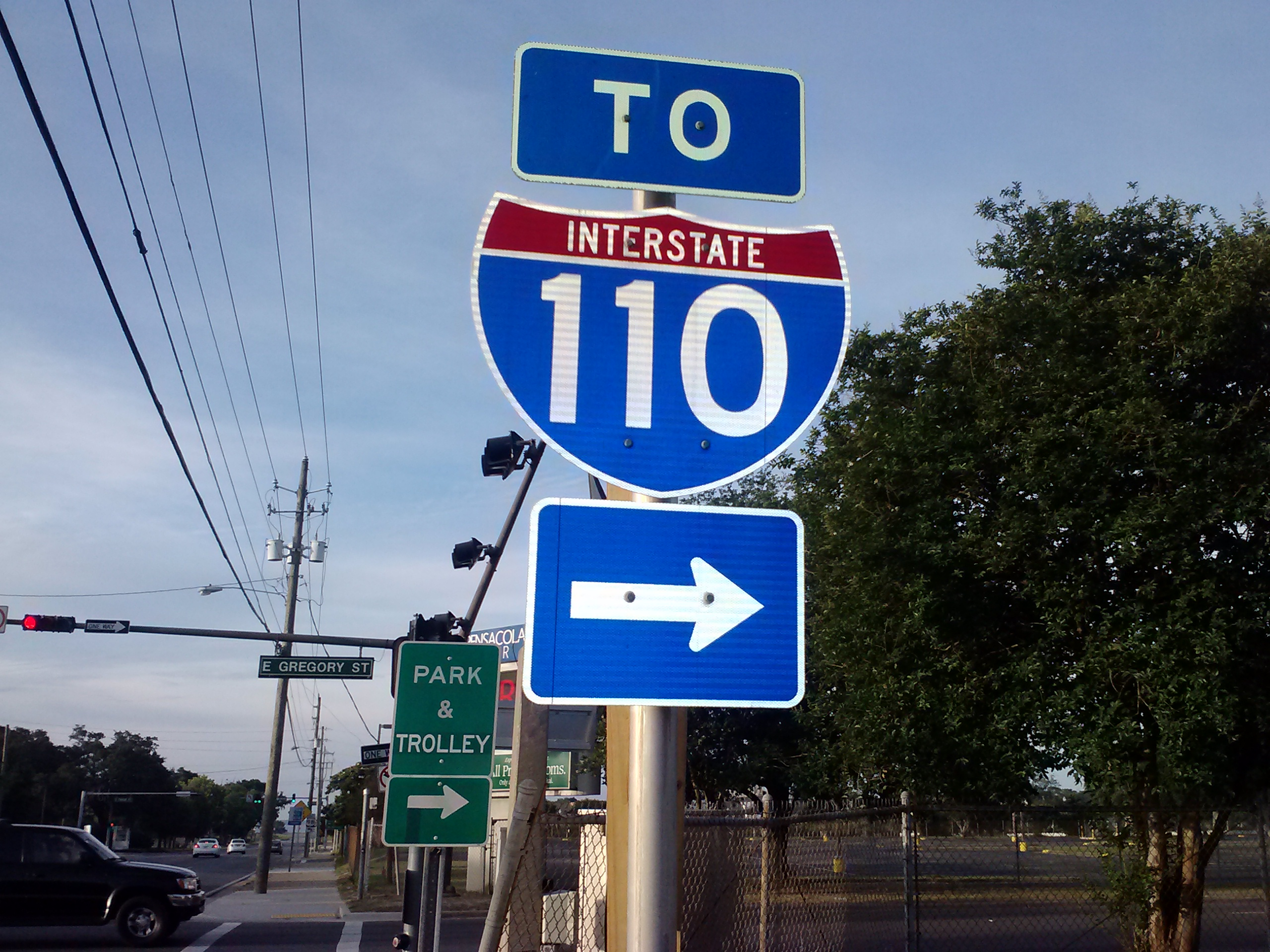
I-110 shield near Downtown Pensacola

Between 2004 and 2009, I-110 was rebuilt and expanded to a minimum of six lanes between I-10 and Maxwell Street. Reconstruction of the freeway included access to and from Airport Boulevard via a modification of the existing Brent Lane interchange. The interchange with I-10 was rebuilt to include new flyover ramps to I-10 eastbound and from I-10 westbound, as well as direct connections to and from SR 291.

Originally, north of SR 750/Airport Boulevard, there was an overpass for SR 742 along Burgess Road. In 2006, SR 742 was rerouted along a new, wider overpass at Creighton Road, and the Burgess Road overpass was demolished.

== Exit list ==
The entire route is in Escambia County.

Location	mi	km	Exit	Destinations	Notes
Pensacola	0.000	0.000	1A	Gregory Street west	Southbound exit and northbound entrance; serves Pensacola Bay Center
Pensacola	0.000	0.000	1B	US 98 (Chase Street / SR 30) / to Gregory Street east – Beaches, Gulf Breeze, Gulf Islands National Seashore	Southbound exit and northbound entrance
Pensacola	0.000	0.000	1C	US 98 Bus. west (Garden Street / SR 30) – Historical District	Southbound exit
Pensacola	0.530	0.853	2	US 90 (Cervantes Street / US 98 / SR 10A)	Southbound exit and northbound entrance
Pensacola	1.468	2.363	3	Maxwell Street / Jordan Street	Southbound exit and northbound entrance
Pensacola	2.692	4.332	4	SR 295 (Fairfield Drive)	Northbound ramps intersect with SR 291 (Davis Highway)
Brent	4.145	6.671	5	SR 296 (Brent Lane) / SR 750 / (Airport Boulevard)	serves Pensacola International Airport, Pensacola State College, Pensacola Christian College, Baptist Hospital, and Sacred Heart Hospital; originally connected to SR 296 only (prior to October 2009)
Brent–Ferry Pass– Ensley tripoint	6.341	10.205	6	I-10 (SR 8) to SR 291 (Davis Highway) – Tallahassee, Mobile	I-10 exit 12; exit 6 is signed as the ramp to I-10 east and SR 291; modified trumpet/directional T interchange; serves HCA Florida West Hospital.
1.000 mi = 1.609 km; 1.000 km = 0.621 mi: Incomplete access
