= Brownsville-Brent-Goulding, Florida =

Brownsville-Brent-Goulding
- Former CDP
- Location within the state of Florida
- Coordinates: 30°26′14″N 87°13′50″W
- Country: United States
- State: Florida
- County: Escambia

Population (1950)
  - Total: 20,269
- Time zone: UTC-6 (Central (CST))
  - Summer (DST): UTC-5 (CDT)

Brownsville-Brent-Goulding was a Census-designated place in Escambia County, Florida during the 1950 United States Census, which consists of the communities of Brent, Brownsville, Goulding and West Pensacola. The population in 1950 was 20,269.

The census area's name was reduced to just "Brownsville" during the 1960 Census, when the population increased to 38,417. During the 1970 census, the census area was reduced and was reassigned to West Pensacola, with a recorded population of 20,924. The communities of Brent and Goulding were not returned separately by census enumerators until 1980.

== Geography ==
The census area of Brownsville-Brent-Goulding was located northwest of Pensacola and northeast of Warrington, the only existing CDP in the county enumerated since the concept began in 1950.
