= Escambia Bay Bridge =

Bridge in Florida, United States

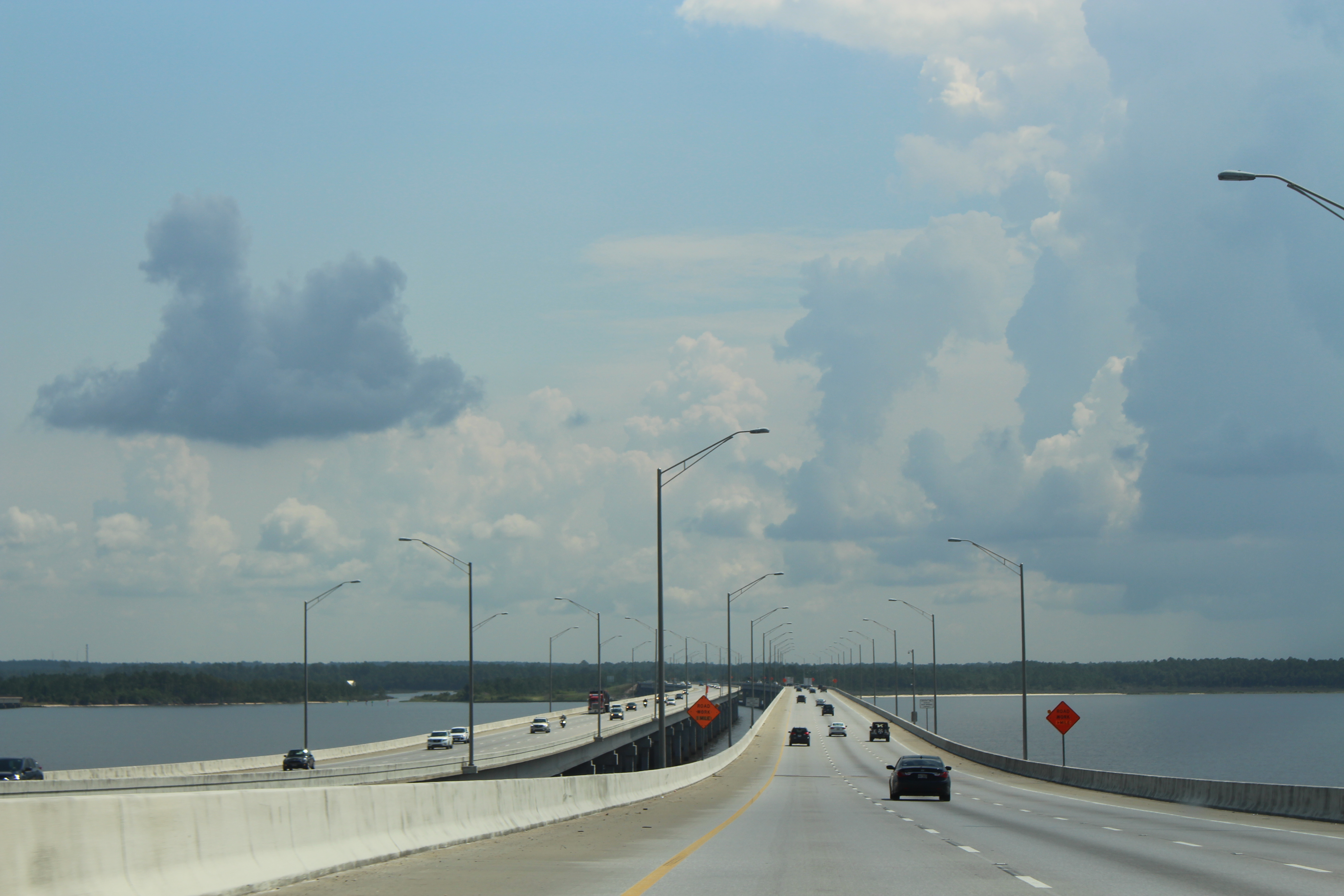
- On bridge heading east
- Coordinates: 30.518947°N 87.144069°W
- Carries: 6 lanes of I-10
- Crosses: Escambia Bay
- Locale: Escambia County / Santa Rosa County, near Pensacola, Florida, USA
- Maintained by: Florida Department of Transportation (FDOT)
- ID number: 480213 (eastbound); 480214 (westbound)

Characteristics
- Design: Reinforced concrete girder bridge
- Total length: 13,820 feet (4,210 m) (eastbound); 13,736 feet (4,187 m) (westbound)
- Clearance below: 65 feet (20 m)

History
- Opened: 1968 (original bridge); 2007 (current bridge)

Statistics
- Daily traffic: 50,000

Location
- Interactive map of Escambia Bay Bridge

The Escambia Bay Bridge is a six-lane freeway bridge that carries Interstate 10 (I-10) across Escambia Bay near Pensacola, Florida.

== History ==
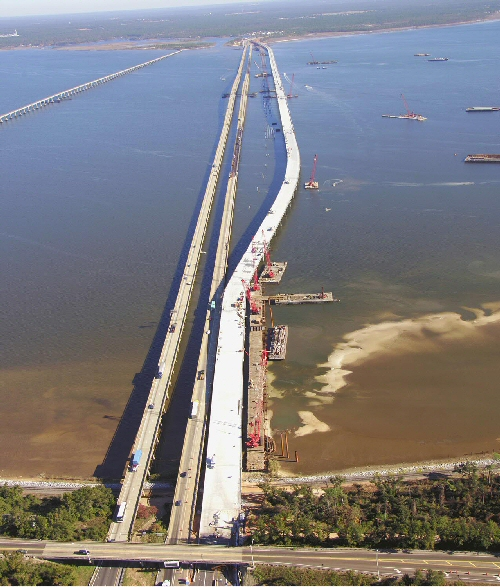
Replacement of I-10 bridges over Escambia Bay

The original four-lane bridge opened in 1968. It consisted of twin spans of two lanes each with no shoulders and was heavily damaged during Hurricane Ivan in 2004. The storm surge knocked a total of 58 spans off the eastbound and westbound bridges and misaligned another 66 spans, causing the bridge to close to traffic in both directions. A $26.5 million dollar project was awarded to Gilbert Southern/Massman and the Parsons Corporation to make emergency repairs to the bridge. Traffic normally destined for the bridge was rerouted along U.S. Route 90 (US 90, exit 17) for over two months while temporary spans were built along the bridge's existing substructure, resulting in severe traffic jams. The westbound spans were completed and opened to traffic on October 4, 7 days ahead of schedule, while the eastbound spans were completed and opened to traffic on November 20, 66 days after Ivan made landfall and 27 days ahead of schedule. Both contractors received $1.5 million in bonuses for the early completion.

Construction on a new bridge to replace the one damaged by the hurricane began in early 2006. As the original bridge was left in place during construction, the new bridge was routed to the south and has a curved alignment near the beginning and end of each approach. Unlike the previous bridge, the new bridge features a total of six lanes (three eastbound and three westbound) as well as shoulders, modern barrier walls and lighting. The westbound portion of the bridge opened on December 12, 2007.

The bridge connects the northern part of Florida with the Gulf Coast and was estimated to be used by 50,000 vehicles per day in 2011.

The Scenic Highway overpass that runs over and perpendicular to the I-10 bridge (seen running left to right at the very bottom of the above picture) was also replaced by a new bridge in 2015. New acceleration and deceleration lanes were also added due to the addition of a third lane each way on the section to the west of the interchange.
