= Baptist Hospital (Pensacola) =

- Baptist Health Care

Geography
- Location: 123 Baptist Way, Pensacola, Florida, Pensacola, Florida, United States
- Coordinates: 30°25′47″N 87°13′52″W

Services
- Emergency department: Level II trauma center
- Beds: 264

Helipads
- Helipad: Yes

History
- Founded: 1951

Links
- Website: https://www.ebaptisthealthcare.org/
- Lists: Hospitals in Florida

Baptist Hospital is located in Pensacola, Florida, in Escambia county. It is the area's only locally based not-for-profit hospital. It originally opened in 1951. The campus is at 123 Baptist Way off Brent Lane in Pensacola, Florida. It is a 10-story, 264-bed hospital.

== History ==
Baptist Hospital of Pensacola, Florida, opened in 1951.

The new campus, also in Pensacola, opened in 2023.

== Facilities ==
Baptist Hospital is currently located at 123 Baptist Way, in Pensacola, Florida, next to the interchange between Brent Lane and I-110. The campus includes a 10-story, 264-bed hospital. Baptist Hospital is a state-certified Level II trauma center.
