= National Airlines Flight 193 =

1978 aviation accident off the coast of Florida

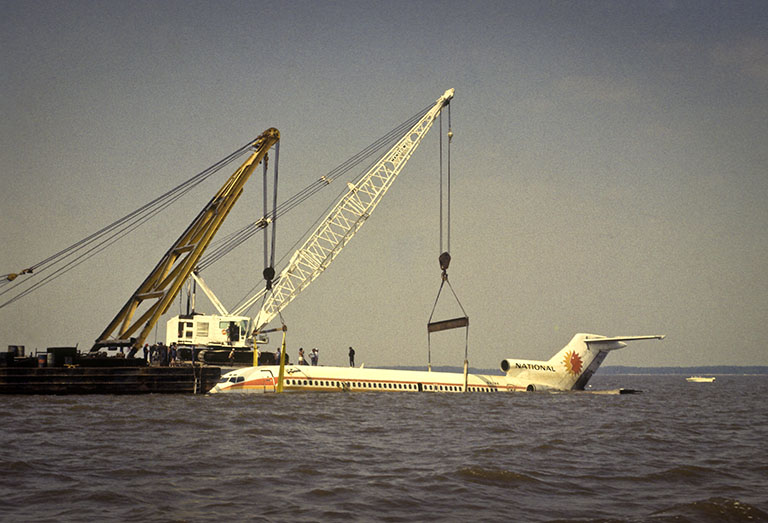
- N4744 during recovery

Accident
- Date: May 8, 1978
- Summary: Controlled flight into terrain due to pilot error and lack of crew resource management leading to a loss of situational awareness
- Site: Escambia Bay near Pensacola Regional Airport, Pensacola, Florida; 30°29′8″N 87°7′3″W

Aircraft
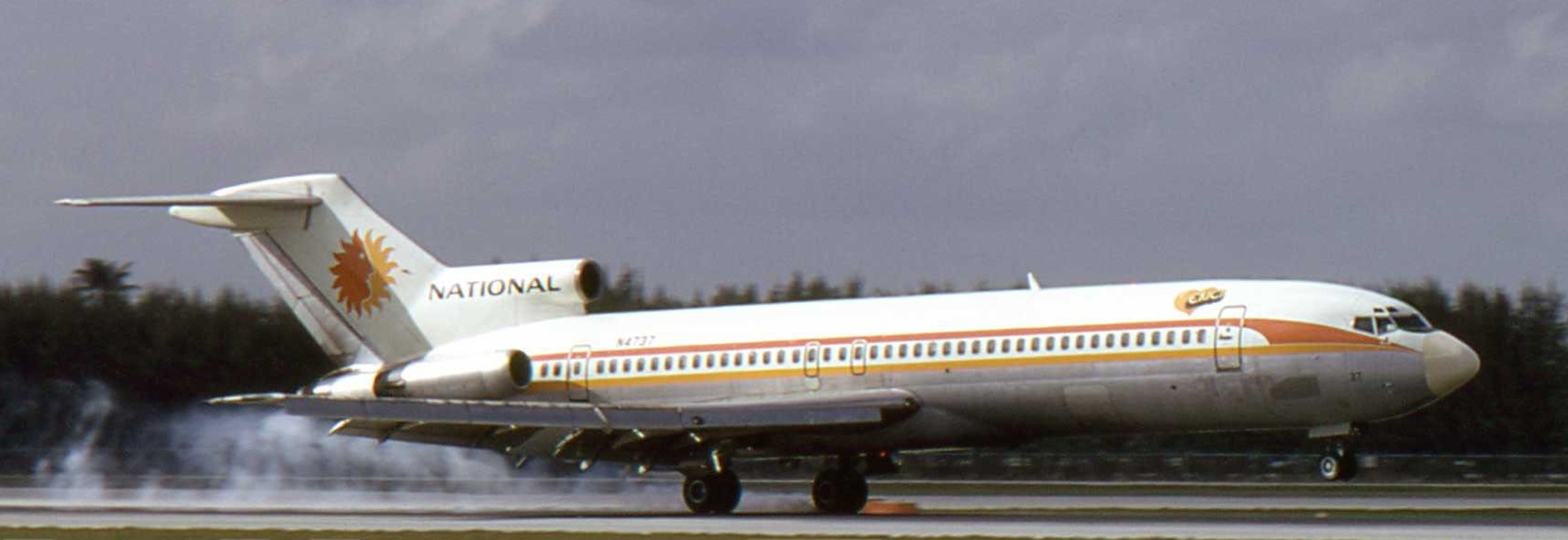
- N4737, similar to the one involved. This aircraft would later crash in 1982 as Pan Am Flight 759
- Aircraft type: Boeing 727-235
- Aircraft name: Donna
- Operator: National Airlines
- Registration: N4744
- Flight origin: Miami International Airport
- Stopover: Melbourne International Airport, Melbourne, Florida
- 1st stopover: Tampa International Airport, Tampa, Florida
- 2nd stopover: Louis Armstrong New Orleans International Airport
- 3rd stopover: Mobile Municipal Airport, Mobile, Alabama
- Destination: Pensacola Regional Airport, Pensacola, Florida
- Occupants: 58
- Passengers: 52
- Crew: 6
- Fatalities: 3
- Injuries: 11
- Survivors: 55

National Airlines Flight 193, registration N4744, Donna, was a Boeing 727-235 en route from Miami, Florida to Pensacola on May 8, 1978. It was scheduled with stops at Melbourne, Florida; Tampa; New Orleans, Louisiana and Mobile, Alabama. The accident occurred at night in low visibility from fog. During the descent into Pensacola Regional Airport it impacted Escambia Bay, sinking in 12 feet (3.7 m) of water.

== Flight crew ==
The crew consisted of Captain George T. Kunz (age 55), employed by National Airlines since 1956, who had qualified to fly the Boeing 727 in 1967 and accumulated 18,109 flight hours in his career with 5,358 hours on the Boeing 727; First Officer Leonard G. Sanderson Jr. (31), employed by National Airlines since 1976, with 4,848 flight hours of which 842 hours were on the Boeing 727; and Flight Engineer James K. Stockwell (47), employed by National Airlines since 1969, with 9,486 flight hours of which 7,050 flight hours were on the Boeing 727.

== Incident ==
The instrument landing system (ILS) for runway 16 had been out of service since January of that year for runway reconstruction. A non-precision approach to runway 25 was available instead. Prior to initiating the approach a twin engine Beechcraft reported breaking out of the overcast at 450 feet (140 m). The minimum descent altitude for this approach was 480 feet (150 m). This concerned the first officer who informed the captain in his opinion that plane had made an illegal approach. An Eastern Air Lines jet ahead of them reported briefly having the runway in sight before losing it in the clouds and going around.

While established on the approach the first officer neglected to make altitude and approach fix call outs. The ground proximity alarm sounded and the first officer checked his altimeter. He read it as 1,500 feet (460 m) and turned off the alarm. The flight data recorder would later show their actual altitude at this point was only 500 feet (150 m). The flight crew may have been distracted by the alarm and failed to realize they passed through the minimum descent altitude. Shortly after this they impacted Escambia Bay. Barge traffic in the area assisted in the evacuation. Three passengers drowned attempting to exit the aircraft. The aircraft was intact after the accident and was removed to a hangar at Naval Air Station Pensacola but written off due to extensive sea water corrosion. The airframe was subsequently disassembled and removed from the air base to a scrapping location.

== Accident analysis ==
Contributing to the crash was poor preparation on the part of the flight crew. While the captain and first officer were aware that runway 16 was closed, they had both forgotten it. A visual approach slope indicator (VASI) light system serving runway 25 was available and operational, but while the information was available to the flight crew, the flight crew was unaware of this alternate approach aid.

An additional contributing factor to the crash was an error on the part of the radar controller. Procedure for runway 25 was to direct flights to intercept the final approach at 8 nmi, with the approach gate at 6 nmi. The controller misjudged the aircraft's distance and turned it to final inside the recommended distance, resulting in the aircraft being on final approach vector at about 4.5 nmi, close to half the distance of a normal approach. The NTSB report concludes the controller "created a situation that would make it impossible for the captain to configure his aircraft in the manner specified in the flight manual".

A reluctance to declare a missed approach pervaded the descent. Radar controller, captain, first officer and flight engineer all had indications of an out of the ordinary approach, producing a rushed and busy environment. An example of this was that the captain failed to lower the landing gear immediately after lowering the flaps to 25 degrees, because he "wanted to avoid placing a simultaneous demand on the hydraulic system while the flaps were in transit". Similarly, the first officer never made the required 1,000-ft callout, because he never got to 1,000 ft mentally, because of his "inner time clock" which was based on a normal descent rate. In addition, each person chose not to ask for or offer additional assistance or warnings, including recommended announcements and acknowledgments. The lack of crew communication and a "no problem here" attitude resulted in false awareness of altitude and descent rate on the part of all involved.

== Evacuation ==
The aircraft was not equipped with, nor was it required to be equipped with, liferafts and approved flotation-type seat cushions. Twenty-four passengers and the crew believed that the seat cushions were flotation devices. Fourteen passengers tried to use them for flotation, and several survivors indicated that the cushions came apart and were not buoyant.

Since, by regulation, (subsequently changed) the Pensacola to Mobile portion of the flight was not an extended overwater flight, the passenger briefing did not include the location and use of water survival equipment. Therefore many passengers were not aware of the location of the life vests, how to don them, how to use them, and the location and use of the life vest's emergency lights. Those passengers who knew or were told that the life vests were stowed in compartments beneath the seats had difficulty extracting them. Rising water in the cabin compounded the problems of locating and removing the vests from the underseat compartments.

== See also ==
- Water landing
