= Oak Grove, Escambia County, Florida =

Oak Grove, Florida
- Unincorporated community
- Location within Florida
- Coordinates: 30°54′32″N 87°25′39″W
- Country: United States
- State: Florida
- County: Escambia
- Elevation: 262 ft (80 m)
- Time zone: UTC-6 (Central (CST))
  - Summer (DST): UTC-5 (CDT)
- Area code: 850
- GNIS feature ID: 295495

Oak Grove is an unincorporated community in Escambia County, Florida, United States.
