= Myrtle Grove, Florida =

- Census-designated place
- Location in Escambia County and the state of Florida
- Coordinates: 30°24′57″N 87°18′10″W
- Country: United States
- State: Florida
- County: Escambia

Area
  - Total: 6.72 sq mi (17.41 km^{2})
  - Land: 6.64 sq mi (17.21 km^{2})
  - Water: 0.077 sq mi (0.20 km^{2})
- Elevation: 49 ft (15 m)

Population (2020)
  - Total: 17,224
  - Density: 2,592.6/sq mi (1,000.99/km^{2})
- Time zone: UTC-6 (Central (CST))
  - Summer (DST): UTC-5 (CDT)
- FIPS code: 12-47550
- GNIS feature ID: 2403322

Myrtle Grove is a census-designated place (CDP) in Escambia County, Florida, United States. The population was 17,224 at the 2020 census, up from 15,870 at the 2010 census. It is part of the Pensacola–Ferry Pass–Brent, Florida Metropolitan Statistical Area.

== Geography ==
According to the United States Census Bureau, the CDP has a total area of 6.7 square miles (17.4 km^{2}), of which 6.6 square miles (17.2 km^{2}) is land and 0.077 square miles (0.2 km^{2}), or 1.17%, is water.

The boundaries of the CDP include an area near Blue Angel Parkway to the west, Bellview to the north, Warrington to the south, and West Pensacola to the east.

== Demographics ==
Historical population
Census	Pop.	Note	%±
1970	16,186		—
1980	14,238		−12.0%
1990	17,402		22.2%
2000	17,211		−1.1%
2010	15,870		−7.8%
2020	17,224		8.5%

=== 2020 census ===
As of the 2020 census, Myrtle Grove had a population of 17,224. The median age was 34.0 years. 18.9% of residents were under the age of 18 and 16.5% of residents were 65 years of age or older. For every 100 females there were 103.8 males, and for every 100 females age 18 and over there were 103.8 males age 18 and over.

100.0% of residents lived in urban areas, while 0.0% lived in rural areas.

There were 6,542 households in Myrtle Grove, of which 27.1% had children under the age of 18 living in them. Of all households, 38.7% were married-couple households, 21.8% were households with a male householder and no spouse or partner present, and 32.0% were households with a female householder and no spouse or partner present. About 30.2% of all households were made up of individuals and 11.7% had someone living alone who was 65 years of age or older.

There were 7,176 housing units, of which 8.8% were vacant. The homeowner vacancy rate was 1.4% and the rental vacancy rate was 10.3%.

Racial composition as of the 2020 census
Race	Number	Percent
White	10,469	60.8%
Black or African American	3,376	19.6%
American Indian and Alaska Native	123	0.7%
Asian	836	4.9%
Native Hawaiian and Other Pacific Islander	43	0.2%
Some other race	627	3.6%
Two or more races	1,750	10.2%
Hispanic or Latino (of any race)	1,483	8.6%

=== 2000 census ===
As of the census of 2000, there were 17,211 people, 6,196 households, and 4,126 families residing in the CDP. The population density was 2,606.1 inhabitants per square mile (1,006.2/km^{2}). There were 6,811 housing units at an average density of 1,031.3 per square mile (398.2/km^{2}). The racial makeup of the CDP was 75.24% White, 13.49% African American, 0.89% Native American, 5.01% Asian, 0.30% Pacific Islander, 1.60% from other races, and 3.47% from two or more races. Hispanic or Latino of any race were 4.30% of the population.

There were 6,196 households, out of which 30.3% had children under the age of 18 living with them, 49.3% were married couples living together, 13.5% had a female householder with no husband present, and 33.4% were non-families. 26.8% of all households were made up of individuals, and 9.3% had someone living alone who was 65 years of age or older. The average household size was 2.46 and the average family size was 2.96.

In the CDP, the population was spread out, with 22.2% under the age of 18, 15.9% from 18 to 24, 29.5% from 25 to 44, 19.0% from 45 to 64, and 13.3% who were 65 years of age or older. The median age was 32 years. For every 100 females, there were 104.4 males. For every 100 females age 18 and over, there were 103.2 males.

The median income for a household in the CDP was $33,601, and the median income for a family was $39,646. Males had a median income of $26,737 versus $21,689 for females. The per capita income for the CDP was $18,268. About 11.7% of families and 14.2% of the population were below the poverty line, including 22.3% of those under age 18 and 9.8% of those age 65 or over.

== Education ==
Myrtle Grove is part of the Escambia County School District, which serves the entire county. Myrtle Grove is the home of Escambia High School.
