= Pensacon =

Multi-genre convention held in Pensacola, FL, USA

Coordinates: 33.761397°N 84.387536°W

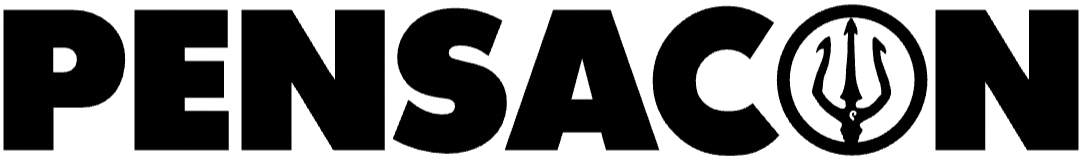

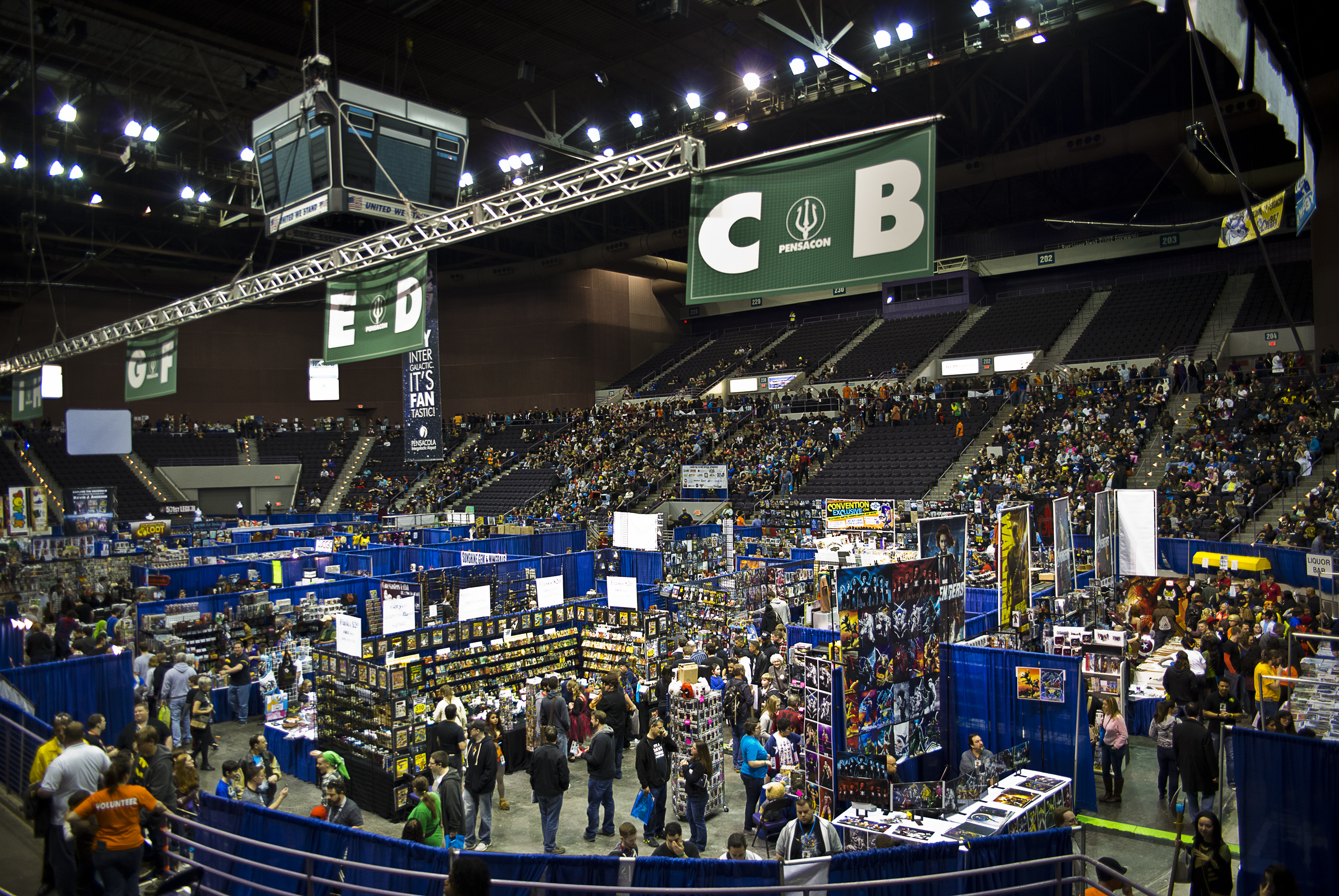
- Pensacon 2015
- Status: Active
- Genre: Multi-genre
- Venue: Crowne Plaza Pensacola Grand Hotel, Pensacola Bay Center
- Locations: Pensacola, Florida
- Country: United States
- Inaugurated: 2014
- Attendance: 11,000+
- Organizer: Mike Ensley, Chairman
- Filing status: For-profit
- Website: pensacon.com

Pensacon is a North American multigenre convention, founded in 2013, which takes place once each year in Pensacola, Florida. As of 2018, the convention draws an attendance of more than 25,000, features around 100 media guests, encompasses five venues in downtown Pensacola and runs hundreds of hours of programming for fans of science fiction, fantasy, comic books, and other elements of fan culture. It is operated by a private for-profit corporation, with the help of a 350-member volunteer staff.

== Economic impact ==
On February 21-23, 2014, Pensacon attracted an estimated 11,000 unique attendees at the Pensacola Crowne Plaza Grand Hotel and the Pensacola Bay Center. It is estimated that Pensacon 2014 attendees contributed $1,408,108 to the local Pensacola economy. 39% of the event attendees were visitors to Pensacola, and it is estimated that Pensacon 2014 generated 5,183 room nights.

== Programming ==
As of 2014, Pensacon is a 3-day event comprising events such as panels, costume contests, themed runs, and workshops, with over 30 specialized programming tracks that include writing, art, anime, gaming, science fiction and fantasy, literature, comic books, costuming, space, science, online media, independent film, podcasting, robotics, Star Trek, Star Wars, Battlestar Galactica, The X-Files, Doctor Who, apocalyptic themes, British and American SF television, the Pensacon Short Film Festival, with celebrity guest features (e.g., Billy Dee Williams, Peter Mayhew, Ernie Hudson, Dirk Benedict ).

== Monica Rial controversy ==
In the weeks leading up to Pensacon 2019, one of their planned panelists, Monica Rial, became involved with the controversy surrounding the allegations of sexual misconduct by voice actor Vic Mignogna after speaking out against the voice actor. As a result, Rial was harassed by some supporters of Vic Mignogna through Twitter, especially after Funimation cut ties with Mignogna in light of the controversy following an internal investigation. Pensacon responded to Twitter messages from people claiming that they would attend the convention to "harass and question" Rial by announcing a zero tolerance policy, and threatened people with arrest if they harassed Rial at the convention. After threats were directed at Rial – including a bomb threat directed towards the convention – security at the event was increased. In 2026, Rial was invited back to the convention as a guest.
