= Brownsville, Escambia County, Florida =

Brownsville, Florida
- Unincorporated community
- Location within the state of Florida Brownsville (the United States)
- Coordinates: 30°25′51″N 87°15′11″W
- Country: United States
- State: Florida
- County: Escambia
- Time zone: UTC-6 (Central (CST))
  - Summer (DST): UTC-5 (CDT)
- ZIP code: 32505
- Area code: 850
- GNIS feature ID: 279498
- Website: Community website

Brownsville is an unincorporated community in Escambia County, Florida, United States. It is located within the census-designated place of West Pensacola. It was enumerated as a Census-Designated Place in 1960, when the population recorded was 38,417. The ZIP code for Brownsville is 32505.

== Geography ==
Historical population
Census	Pop.	Note	%±
1950	20,269		—
1960	38,417		89.5%
2010	unknown		—

Brownsville is located at 30.4 degrees north, 87.3 degrees west (30.4252, -87.2519); or approximately three miles northwest of Pensacola. The elevation for the community is 85 feet above sea level.

Brownsville boundaries include the city of Pensacola to the south and east, Avery Street to the north, and West Pensacola to the west.

== Major surface roads in Brownsville ==
Some of the major surface roads serving the community include:

- Cervantes Street
- Pace Boulevard
- ”T” Street
- ”W” Street
- Corry Field Road
- Jackson Street

== Education ==
The community of Brownsville is served by Escambia County School District, which serves the entire county.

== See also ==
- Brownsville-Brent-Goulding, Florida, a single census area recorded during the 1950 United States census
- Brownsville Revival
