= Millview, Florida =

- Unincorporated community
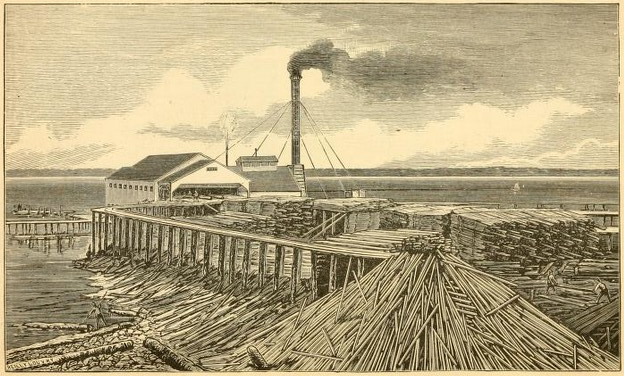
- Perdido Bay Lumber Company Mill in Millview

- Location within the state of Florida
- Coordinates: 30°25′05″N 87°21′22″W
- Country: United States
- State: Florida
- County: Escambia
- Elevation: 7 ft (2.1 m)
- Time zone: UTC-6 (Central (CST))
  - Summer (DST): UTC-5 (CDT)
- ZIP code: 32506
- GNIS feature ID: 286940

Millview is an unincorporated community located along Perdido Bay in Escambia County, Florida, United States.

== History ==
Millview may have been settled as early as 1783. Millview's history has been closely tied to that of the lumber industry, and the community was once home to as many as six different lumber mills and had a population of 3,000 residents. One of the first recorded sawmills was built in 1868 and could produce up to 35,000 feet of lumber per day. Some of the sawmills that operated in Millview included the Wright Mill, Robinson Mill, Seminole Mill, McLane Mill, New Mill and the Perdido Bay Lumber Company Mill. In 1880, the annual production of all mills in Millview was 30-40 million board feet. The Perdido Bay Lumber Company mill was the largest mill in Millview, measuring 175 feet x 55 feet. The mill contained one engine, a gang saw, two circular saws, and six boilers. The Southern States Lumber Company purchased much of the land in Millview after the Civil War and donated land for a church and school.

The Pensacola and Perdido Railroad was a 9-mile railroad that began hauling lumber from Millview to Pensacola Bay in 1874. In 1893, Henry McLaughlin extended the Pensacola, Alabama, and Tennessee Railroad from Millview to Muscogee. In February 1913, McLauglin incorporated the Pensacola, Mobile, and New Orleans Railway, which absorbed the Pensacola, Alabama, and Tennessee and Pensacola and Perdido Railroads.

J. B. Johnson and George Robinson both owned sawmills and general stores in Millview and printed their own scrip for use in their stores.

A post office operated under the name Millview from 1872 to 1935.

== Gallery ==
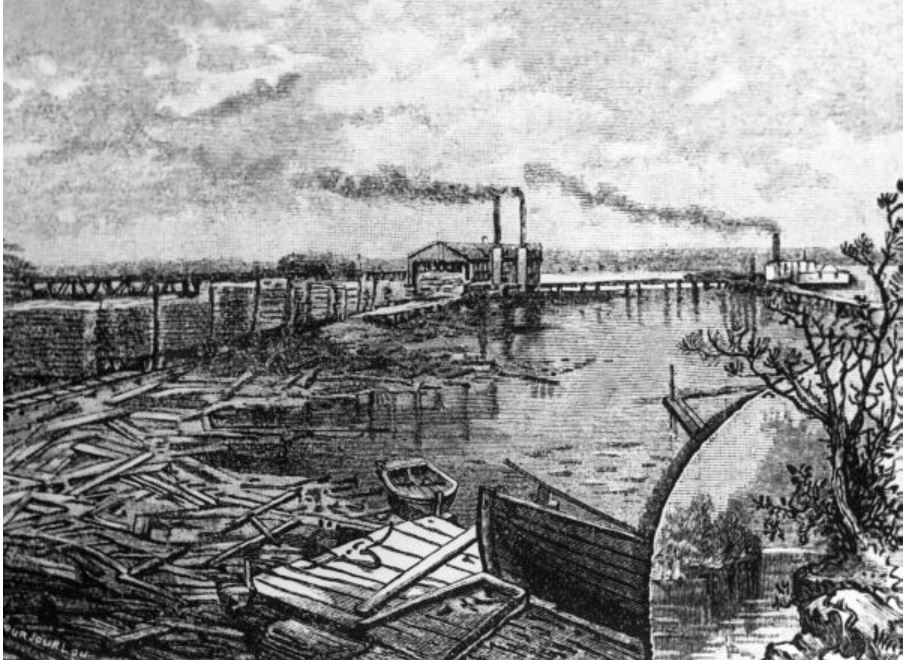
George Robinson's Mill at Millview

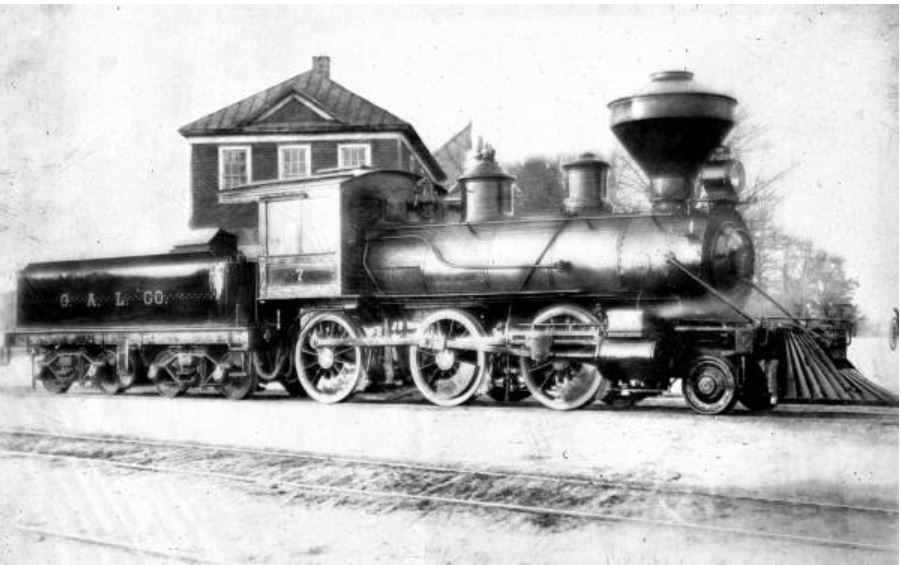
German American Lumber Company engine number 7 at Millview

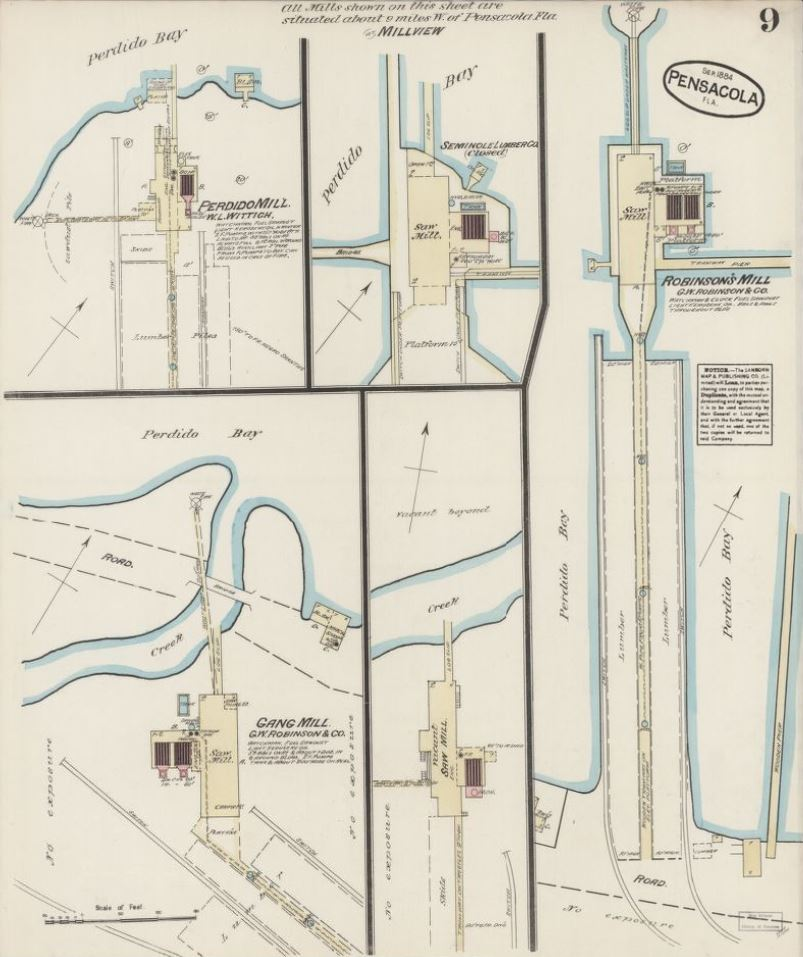
Sanborn map of lumber mills at Millview in 1884

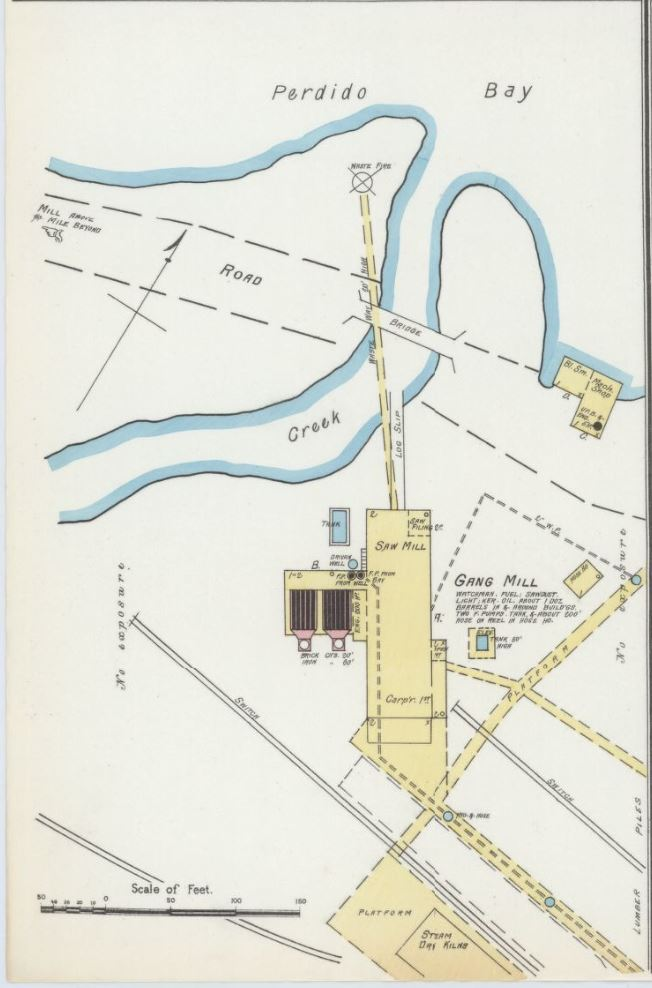
Sanborn map of Robinson Lumber Company's Gang Mill

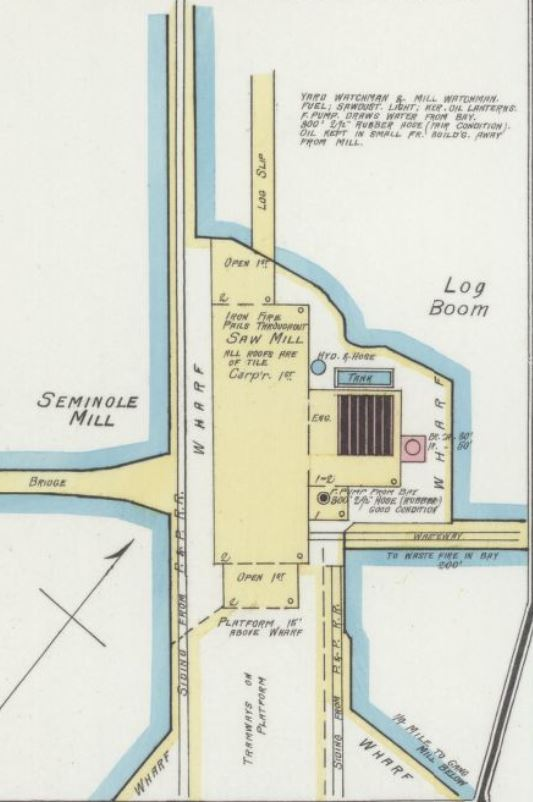
Sanborn map of Seminole Mill
