= Escambia Bay =

Bay in Florida, United States

Coordinates: 30°32′29″N 87°09′08″W

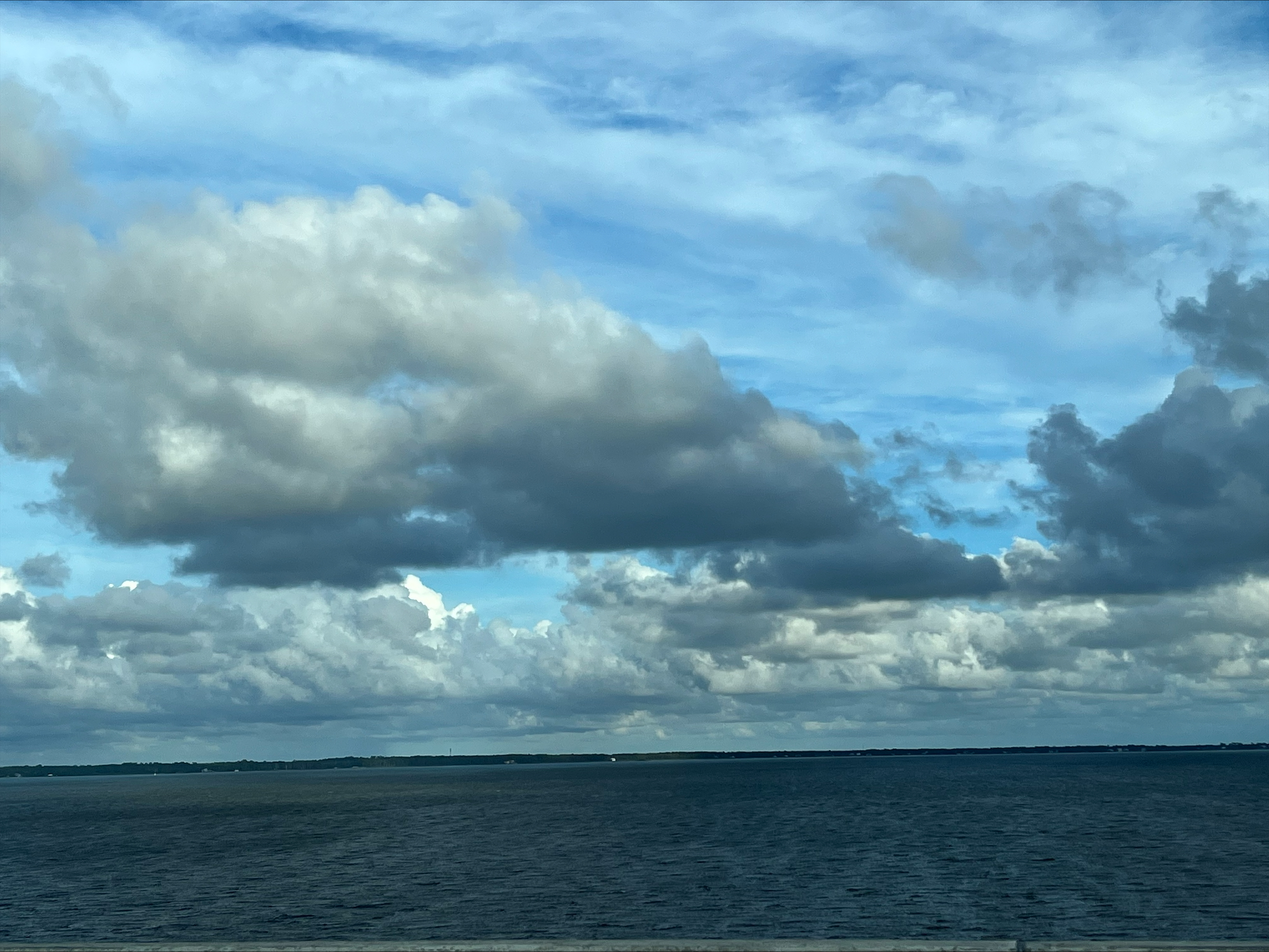
Escambia Bay from the Escambia Bay Bridge.

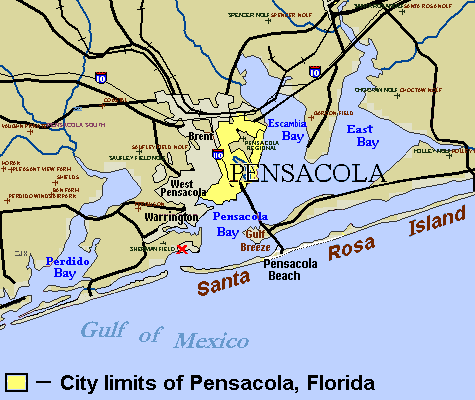
Escambia Bay (upper center) is east of Pensacola, Florida.

Escambia Bay is a bay located in Escambia and Santa Rosa counties, in the far western Florida Panhandle. The city of Pensacola is located on the western side, and the town of Milton is located on the northeastern end of the two-pronged bay. Both places are the county seats of the respective counties. Unusually, Escambia Bay is connected to open waters via Pensacola Bay to its southeast. It is fed primarily by the Escambia River.

National Airlines Flight 193, a Boeing 727, crashed into Escambia Bay during a descent into Pensacola Regional Airport on May 8, 1978. There were 3 fatalities among the 58 people on board.

During Hurricane Ivan in September 2004, the storm surge from the Gulf of Mexico came into Escambia Bay, washing out the Interstate 10 Escambia Bay Bridge.
