= West Pensacola, Florida =

- Census-designated place
- Location in Escambia County and the state of Florida
- Coordinates: 30°25′44″N 87°15′36″W
- Country: United States
- State: Florida
- County: Escambia

Area
  - Total: 7.32 sq mi (18.97 km^{2})
  - Land: 7.17 sq mi (18.57 km^{2})
  - Water: 0.15 sq mi (0.39 km^{2})
- Elevation: 66 ft (20 m)

Population (2020)
  - Total: 21,019
  - Density: 2,930.9/sq mi (1,131.62/km^{2})
- Time zone: UTC-6 (Central (CST))
  - Summer (DST): UTC-5 (CDT)
- FIPS code: 12-76675
- GNIS feature ID: 2403008

West Pensacola is a census-designated place (CDP) in Escambia County, Florida. The population was 21,019 at the 2020 census, down from 21,339 at the 2010 census. It is part of the Pensacola–Ferry Pass–Brent, Florida Metropolitan Statistical Area. The CDP area includes the community of Brownsville.

== Geography ==
West Pensacola is located approximately 4 miles (6 km) west of downtown Pensacola. The elevation of the CDP is 76 feet above sea level.

According to the United States Census Bureau, the CDP has a total area of 7.3 square miles (19.0 km^{2}), of which 7.2 square miles (18.6 km^{2}) is land and 0.15 square miles (0.4 km^{2}), or 2.07%, is water.

== Demographics ==
Historical population
Census	Pop.	Note	%±
1970	20,924		—
1980	24,371		16.5%
1990	22,107		−9.3%
2000	21,939		−0.8%
2010	21,339		−2.7%
2020	21,019		−1.5%

=== 2020 census ===
As of the 2020 census, West Pensacola had a population of 21,019. The median age was 36.2 years. 25.2% of residents were under the age of 18 and 14.3% of residents were 65 years of age or older. For every 100 females there were 94.5 males, and for every 100 females age 18 and over there were 90.7 males age 18 and over.

100.0% of residents lived in urban areas, while 0.0% lived in rural areas.

There were 8,300 households in West Pensacola, of which 30.1% had children under the age of 18 living in them. Of all households, 26.5% were married-couple households, 24.7% were households with a male householder and no spouse or partner present, and 39.5% were households with a female householder and no spouse or partner present. About 33.3% of all households were made up of individuals and 12.6% had someone living alone who was 65 years of age or older.

There were 9,974 housing units, of which 16.8% were vacant. The homeowner vacancy rate was 3.6% and the rental vacancy rate was 17.3%.

Racial composition as of the 2020 census
Race	Number	Percent
White	9,216	43.8%
Black or African American	8,489	40.4%
American Indian and Alaska Native	198	0.9%
Asian	694	3.3%
Native Hawaiian and Other Pacific Islander	16	0.1%
Some other race	767	3.6%
Two or more races	1,639	7.8%
Hispanic or Latino (of any race)	1,651	7.9%

=== 2000 census ===
As of the census of 2000, there were 21,939 people, 8,818 households, and 5,502 families residing in the CDP. The population density was 2,978.1 inhabitants per square mile (1,149.9/km^{2}). There were 9,886 housing units at an average density of 1,342.0 per square mile (518.1/km^{2}). The racial makeup of the CDP was 58.06% White, 33.69% African American, 1.24% Native American, 3.40% Asian, 0.19% Pacific Islander, 0.75% from other races, and 2.68% from two or more races. Hispanic or Latino of any race were 2.60% of the population.

There were 8,818 households, out of which 30.0% had children under the age of 18 living with them, 35.0% were married couples living together, 22.0% had a female householder with no husband present, and 37.6% were non-families. 30.7% of all households were made up of individuals, and 11.0% had someone living alone who was 65 years of age or older. The average household size was 2.47 and the average family size was 3.08.

In the CDP, the population was spread out, with 27.8% under the age of 18, 10.1% from 18 to 24, 28.5% from 25 to 44, 20.5% from 45 to 64, and 13.1% who were 65 years of age or older. The median age was 34 years. For every 100 females, there were 91.2 males. For every 100 females age 18 and over, there were 87.1 males.

The median income for a household in the CDP was $23,962, and the median income for a family was $29,045. Males had a median income of $24,036 versus $17,945 for females. The per capita income for the CDP was $12,826. About 20.9% of families and 25.3% of the population were below the poverty line, including 38.7% of those under age 18 and 13.9% of those age 65 or over.

== See also ==
- Brownsville-Brent-Goulding, Florida, a single census area recorded during the 1950 Census
