= Pensacola International Airport =

International airport in Pensacola, Florida, United States

- IATA: PNS; ICAO: KPNS; FAA LID: PNS; WMO: 72222

Summary
- Airport type: Public
- Owner: City of Pensacola
- Serves: Pensacola metropolitan area
- Location: Pensacola, Florida, U.S.
- Elevation AMSL: 121 ft (37 m)
- Coordinates: 30°28′24″N 087°11′12″W
- Website: www.FlyPensacola.com

Maps
- FAA airport diagram
- Interactive map of Pensacola International Airport

Runways
Direction	Length		Surface
Direction	ft	m	Surface
17/35	7,004	2,135	Concrete
08/26	7,000	2,134	Asphalt

Statistics (2025)
- Aircraft operations: 142,558
- Based aircraft: 172
- Total passengers served: 3,041,000
- Source: Federal Aviation Administration

Pensacola International Airport (IATA: PNS, ICAO: KPNS, FAA LID: PNS), formerly Pensacola Gulf Coast Regional Airport and Pensacola Regional Airport (Hagler Field), and temporarily branded Pensacola Intergalactic Airport each February in recognition of the local Pensacon convention, is a public use airport three nautical miles (6 km; 3 mi) northeast of the central business district of Pensacola, in Escambia County, Florida, United States. It is owned by the City of Pensacola. This airport is one of five major airports in North Florida, and among these is the second largest by passenger count, only behind Jacksonville. The other four airports in North Florida are: Northwest Florida Beaches International Airport, Destin-Fort Walton Beach Airport, Tallahassee International Airport, and Jacksonville International Airport. Pensacola international airport is the largest airport per passenger count between Jacksonville and New Orleans.

It is included in the Federal Aviation Administration (FAA) National Plan of Integrated Airport Systems for 2021–2025, in which it is categorized as a small-hub primary commercial service facility. As per Federal Aviation Administration records, the airport had 771,917 passenger boardings (enplanements) in calendar year 2008, 694,786 enplanements in 2009, and 729,748 in 2010. In 2018, the airport served 1.9 million passengers.

== History ==
In 1935, a passenger terminal opened, and airline service began two years later. Atlantic and Gulf Airlines went out of business a few months later after failing to get an airmail contract. In 1938 National Airlines began flights to Mobile and Jacksonville. From 1940 to 1945, the airport was a U.S. Navy training facility; the Navy built a control tower and added a fourth runway. In 1947 Eastern Air Lines began service out of Pensacola, and in 1952 a modern terminal replaced the original one. The airport was then dedicated to L.C. Hagler, the former mayor of Pensacola. In 1968 Eastern began the first scheduled jet service from Pensacola.

In 1978, after deregulation of the airline industry, several airlines began serving Pensacola, including Continental and Delta. In 1978 a National Airlines Boeing 727 crashed into Escambia Bay while on approach for landing, the first fatal airline accident in the area. In 1979 US Airways, then called USAir, arrived at Pensacola. In 1990 the current terminal was built and AirTran Airways began jet service in 2001. In 2005 United Express began service out of Pensacola. After stopping service to Pensacola in the 1990s, American Airlines (operating as American Eagle) began service again in Pensacola in 2004. Southwest Airlines initiated service to Pensacola in 2013 after purchasing Airtran Airways. Frontier Airlines initiated service at Pensacola in 2018.

Pensacola mayor Ashton Hayward announced on November 9, 2011, that the airport would change its name from Pensacola Gulf Coast Regional Airport to Pensacola International Airport, effective immediately.

In 2024, the airport set an all-time record with 3,030,411 passengers served.

In 2026, the airport announced a program that would allow people with autism and other physical and intellectual disabilities to have an airport and aviation experience, even if they otherwise would not otherwise be able to fly. In collaboration with local Transportation Security Administration officers, the goal of the event was to create positive, memorable experiences. In that same year, Hurricane Isaias caused some minor damage to the airport.

== Facilities and aircraft ==
Pensacola International Airport covers an area of 1,211 acres (490 ha) at an elevation of 121 feet (37 m) above mean sea level. It has two runways: 17/35 is 7,004 by 150 feet (2,135 x 46 m) with a concrete surface; 08/26 is 7,000 by 150 feet (2,134 x 46 m) with an asphalt surface.

Runway 17 has an instrument landing system and approach lights, while the Runway 26 approach has a localizer approach. A 1,000 ft. extension to the east end of Runway 08/26 was completed in 2006. The airport hopes to extend Runway 17/35 to about 8,500 ft.

The airport's two war-era diagonal runways were decommissioned in the 1960s.

For the 12-month period ending January 31, 2024, the airport had 157,103 aircraft operations, an average of 430 per day: 58% general aviation, 19% military, 16% commercial and 8% air taxi. At the end of January 2024, there were 172 aircraft based at this airport: 141 single-engine, 10 multi-engine, 18 jet, and 3 helicopter.

== Terminal ==
Pensacola has one passenger terminal with 12 gates, built in the early 1990s. Gates 1 through 10 are located on the 2nd floor, while Gates 11 and 12 are located on the ground floor.

Gate assignments:

- American: 5, 6, 7, 8, 9
- Delta: 2, 4
- Southwest: 10
- United: 1, 3
- Frontier: 6, 8, 10
- Spirit: 8
- Breeze: 9

=== Terminal expansion ===
The terminal was expanded in 2011 at a cost of $35 million. The expansion was designed by Gresham, Smith, and Partners and Stoa Architects.

In 2022, it was announced that the city of Pensacola was beginning a $387 million concourse and parking expansion that would provide more space to handle the airport's rapid increase in passenger numbers and flights.

== Management ==
The airport is operated as a self-funding department of the government of the City of Pensacola.

== Airlines and destinations ==
=== Passenger ===
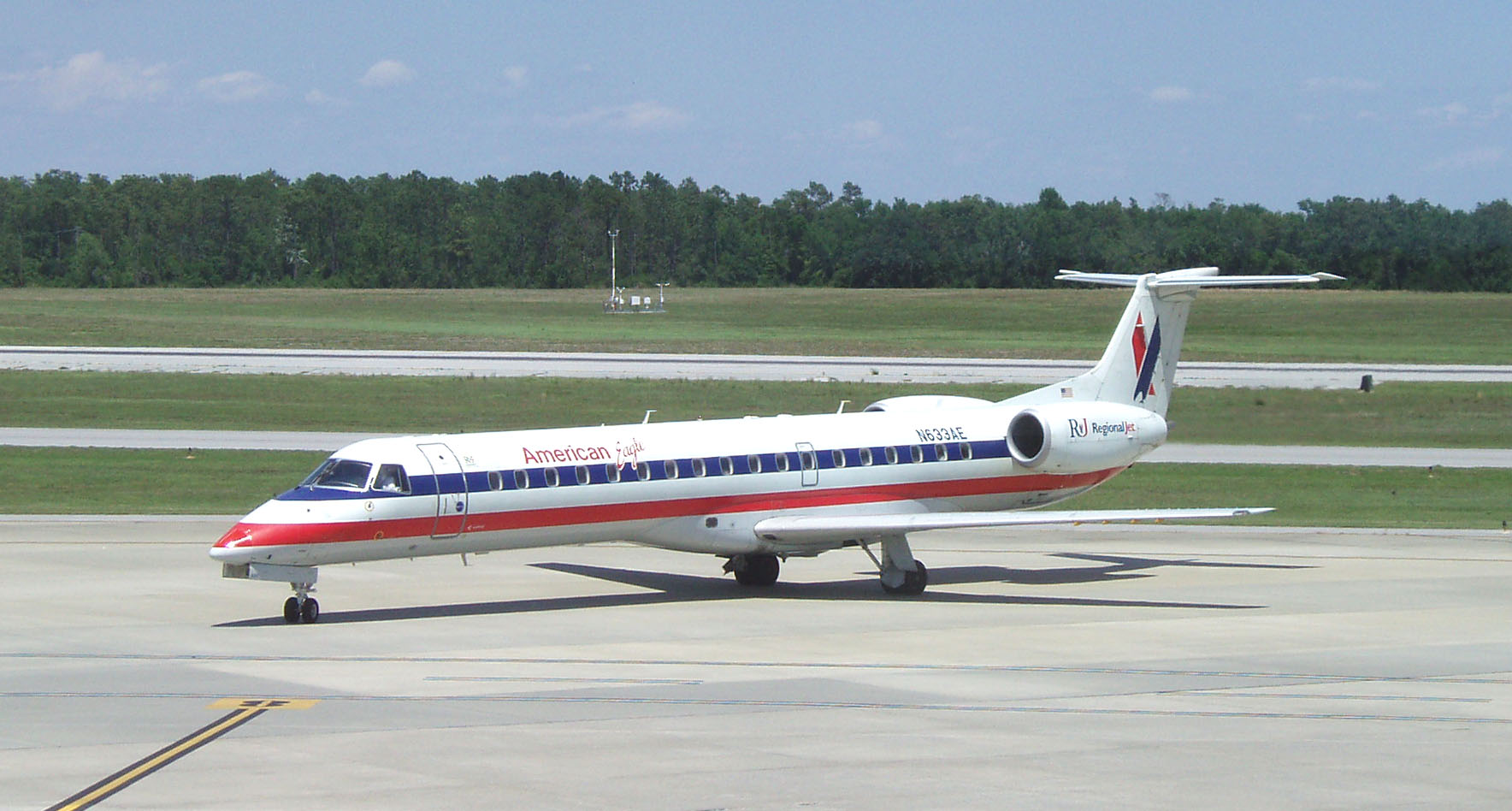
Embraer ERJ 145LR at Pensacola (2006)

Airlines	Destinations
American Airlines	Charlotte, Dallas/Fort Worth; Seasonal: Chicago–O'Hare, Philadelphia
American Eagle	Charlotte, Dallas/Fort Worth, Miami, Washington–National; Seasonal: Chicago–O'Hare, New York–LaGuardia, Philadelphia
Breeze Airways	Fayetteville/Bentonville, Fort Lauderdale, Memphis, Orlando, Raleigh/Durham, Tampa; Seasonal: San Antonio
Contour Airlines	Seasonal: Cape Girardeau, Muscle Shoals
Delta Air Lines	Atlanta
Delta Connection	New York–LaGuardia
Frontier Airlines	Denver, Orlando
Southwest Airlines	Dallas–Love, Houston–Hobby, Nashville, Orlando (begins March 11, 2027); Seasonal: Austin, Baltimore, Chicago–Midway, Denver, Kansas City, St. Louis
United Airlines	Chicago–O'Hare, Denver, Houston–Intercontinental
United Express	Houston–Intercontinental

Destinations map
Destinations from Northwest Florida Beaches International Airport
Red = Year-round destination
Green = Seasonal destination
Blue = Future destination
Pink = Destination being terminated

== Statistics ==
=== Annual traffic ===
PNS Airport Annual Traffic 2008–Present
Year	Passengers	% Change
2008	1,625,603	▼2.10%
2009	1,398,502	▼13.97%
2010	1,439,740	▲2.95%
2011	1,561,540	▲8.46%
2012	1,514,998	▼2.98%
2013	1,516,560	▲0.10%
2014	1,542,982	▲1.74%
2015	1,594,058	▲3.00%
2016	1,604,786	▲0.60%
2017	1,668,897	▲0.10%
2018	2,100,000	▲16.8%
2019	2,200,000	▲17.1%
2020	1,382,131	▼37.1%
2021	2,324,044	▲68.1%
2022	2,417,000	▲0.4%
2023	2,731,604	▲13.0%
2024	3,056,000	▲11.9%
2025	3,041,000	▼0.5%

=== Top destinations ===
Busiest domestic routes from PNS (September 2025 – August 2026)
Rank	City	Passengers	Carriers
1	(Georgia (U.S. state)) Atlanta, Georgia	371,600	Delta
2	Dallas/Fort Worth, Texas	170,960	American
3	Charlotte, North Carolina	139,830	American
4	Nashville, Tennessee	109,240	Southwest
5	Houston–Bush, Texas	97,060	United
6	Denver, Colorado	91,420	Frontier, Southwest, United
7	Chicago–O'Hare, Illinois	69,990	American, United
8	Miami, Florida	63,230	American
9	Dallas–Love, Texas	58,720	Southwest
10	Washington–Reagan, Virginia	53,060	American

=== Airline market share ===
Largest airlines at PNS (September 2025 – August 2026)
Rank	Airline	Passengers	Share
1	Delta Air Lines	745,000	24.59%
2	Southwest Airlines	617,000	20.37%
3	American Airlines	418,000	13.79%
4	PSA Airlines	295,000	9.75%
5	United Airlines	236,000	7.79%
	Other	719,000	23.72%

== Pensacola Intergalactic Airport annual name change ==
Pensacola International Airport undergoes a temporary annual name change to Pensacola Intergalactic Airport in February each year to celebrate Pensacon, a multi-genre convention held in the city of Pensacola. In 2024, the airport changed its name and signage on February 9, ready for the convention scheduled for February 23–25.

== Accidents and incidents ==
- On May 8, 1978 National Airlines Flight 193 landed in Escambia Bay while approaching the east–west runway. Three of the 58 passengers and crew on board were killed.
- On January 2, 1982, a United States Navy Beechcraft Super King Air crashed into a housing development on approach north of Pensacola Regional Airport. The plane struck several trees, fell on a car and collided with an oak tree. The pilot was killed, the other seven occupants survived.
- On December 27, 1987, Eastern Air Lines Flight 573, a McDonnell-Douglas DC-9-31 suffered a hard landing, causing the aircraft to bounce and break apart aft of the wings. All four crew and 103 passengers survived, four passengers sustained minor injuries during evacuation.
- On April 10, 1989, a Southern Company Services Beechcraft Super King Air crashed into an apartment complex 4.1 miles from PNS en route to Atlanta DeKalb-Peachtree Airport. An in-flight cabin fire and smoke disabled the flight crew. All three occupants (2 crew, 1 passenger) died.
- On July 6, 1996, Delta Air Lines Flight 1288, an MD-88, experienced an uncontained engine failure during takeoff on runway 17. Fragments from the number one (left) Pratt & Whitney JT8D-219 turbofan engine penetrated the fuselage, killing two and seriously injuring one of the 148 people on board.
- On July 11, 1996, a United States Air Force F-16C Fighting Falcon crashed into two houses just north of Pensacola Regional Airport while attempting an emergency landing. The plane was en route from Shaw AFB in South Carolina to Eglin AFB in Okaloosa County to escape Hurricane Bertha when it experienced an engine flameout. The pilot ejected safely; however, a 4-year-old child was killed, and the mother was severely burned.
- On June 17, 2025, a T-6 Texan II from NAS Whiting Field's Training Air Wing Five was diverted to Pensacola IAP due to weather in the area but had to make an emergency landing after what was called a "mishap on landing." Preliminary reports showed no deaths or serious injuries in the incident, and the 2 crew members were taken to a local hospital as a precaution.

== Public safety ==
Pensacola International is protected by several local and federal law enforcement and public safety agencies. Specifically, they are served by:

- Pensacola Police Department
- Transportation Security Administration
- Aircraft rescue and firefighting (ARFF) is provided by the Pensacola Fire Department, who operate out of one fire station on the premises.
