= Ferry Pass, Florida =

- Census-designated place
- Location in Escambia County and the state of Florida
- Coordinates: 30°30′25″N 87°08′35″W
- Country: United States
- State: Florida
- County: Escambia

Area
  - Total: 21.12 sq mi (54.71 km^{2})
  - Land: 13.91 sq mi (36.02 km^{2})
  - Water: 7.22 sq mi (18.70 km^{2})
- Elevation: 105 ft (32 m)

Population (2020)
  - Total: 29,921
  - Density: 2,151.6/sq mi (830.72/km^{2})
- Time zone: UTC-6 (Central (CST))
  - Summer (DST): UTC-5 (CDT)
- ZIP Code: 32514
- FIPS code: 12-22275
- GNIS feature ID: 2402481

Ferry Pass is a census-designated place (CDP) in Escambia County, Florida. It is considered to be a community within Pensacola. It is a principal community in the Pensacola—Ferry Pass—Brent, Florida Metropolitan Statistical Area, and is located north of Pensacola city limits. The population was 29,921 at the 2020 United States census, up from 28,921 at the 2010 United States census. The University of West Florida, located in Ferry Pass, is the only university located in the Pensacola metropolitan area.

== Geography ==
According to the United States Census Bureau, the CDP has a total area of 21.0 square miles (54.3 km^{2}), of which 13.9 square miles (36.1 km^{2}) is land and 7.0 square miles (18.2 km^{2}), or 33.57%, is water, consisting of a portion of Escambia Bay. The boundaries of the CDP include Greenbriar Boulevard to the north, Ensley to the west, the city of Pensacola to the south, and Escambia Bay to the east.

== Demographics ==
Historical population
Census	Pop.	Note	%±
1980	16,910		—
1990	26,301		55.5%
2000	27,176		3.3%
2010	28,921		6.4%
2020	29,921		3.5%

=== 2020 census ===
As of the 2020 census, Ferry Pass had a population of 29,921. The median age was 39.9 years. 16.6% of residents were under the age of 18 and 22.8% of residents were 65 years of age or older. For every 100 females there were 87.7 males, and for every 100 females age 18 and over there were 84.7 males age 18 and over.

99.5% of residents lived in urban areas, while 0.5% lived in rural areas.

There were 13,216 households in Ferry Pass, of which 21.8% had children under the age of 18 living in them. Of all households, 33.1% were married-couple households, 22.6% were households with a male householder and no spouse or partner present, and 36.3% were households with a female householder and no spouse or partner present. About 37.2% of all households were made up of individuals and 13.6% had someone living alone who was 65 years of age or older.

There were 14,684 housing units, of which 10.0% were vacant. The homeowner vacancy rate was 2.1% and the rental vacancy rate was 11.0%.

Racial composition as of the 2020 census
Race	Number	Percent
White	20,567	68.7%
Black or African American	4,904	16.4%
American Indian and Alaska Native	176	0.6%
Asian	823	2.8%
Native Hawaiian and Other Pacific Islander	32	0.1%
Some other race	854	2.9%
Two or more races	2,565	8.6%
Hispanic or Latino (of any race)	2,309	7.7%

=== 2000 census ===
As of the census of 2000, there were 27,176 people, 11,569 households, and 6,686 families residing in the CDP. The population density was 1,929.6 inhabitants per square mile (745.0/km^{2}). There were 12,700 housing units at an average density of 901.8 per square mile (348.2/km^{2}). The racial makeup of the CDP was 83.79% White, 10.60% African American, 0.61% Native American, 1.90% Asian, 0.04% Pacific Islander, 0.78% from other races, and 2.27% from two or more races. Hispanic or Latino of any race were 2.72% of the population.

There were 11,569 households, out of which 23.3% had children under the age of 18 living with them, 44.4% were married couples living together, 10.7% had a female householder with no husband present, and 42.2% were non-families. 32.7% of all households were made up of individuals, and 10.6% had someone living alone who was 65 years of age or older. The average household size was 2.17 and the average family size was 2.77.

In the CDP, the population was spread out, with 18.3% under the age of 18, 13.9% from 18 to 24, 28.7% from 25 to 44, 21.5% from 45 to 64, and 17.6% who were 65 years of age or older. The median age was 37 years. For every 100 females, there were 86.7 males. For every 100 females age 18 and over, there were 84.3 males.

The median income for a household in the CDP was $38,674, and the median income for a family was $47,298. Males had a median income of $34,027 versus $23,892 for females. The per capita income for the CDP was $22,165. About 7.7% of families and 12.1% of the population were below the poverty line, including 16.9% of those under age 18 and 7.1% of those age 65 or over.

== Education ==
Ferry Pass is part of the Escambia County School District, which also serves the entire county. The University of West Florida is located in the northern part of the community.
