= Escambia County, Florida =

County in Florida, United States

- County
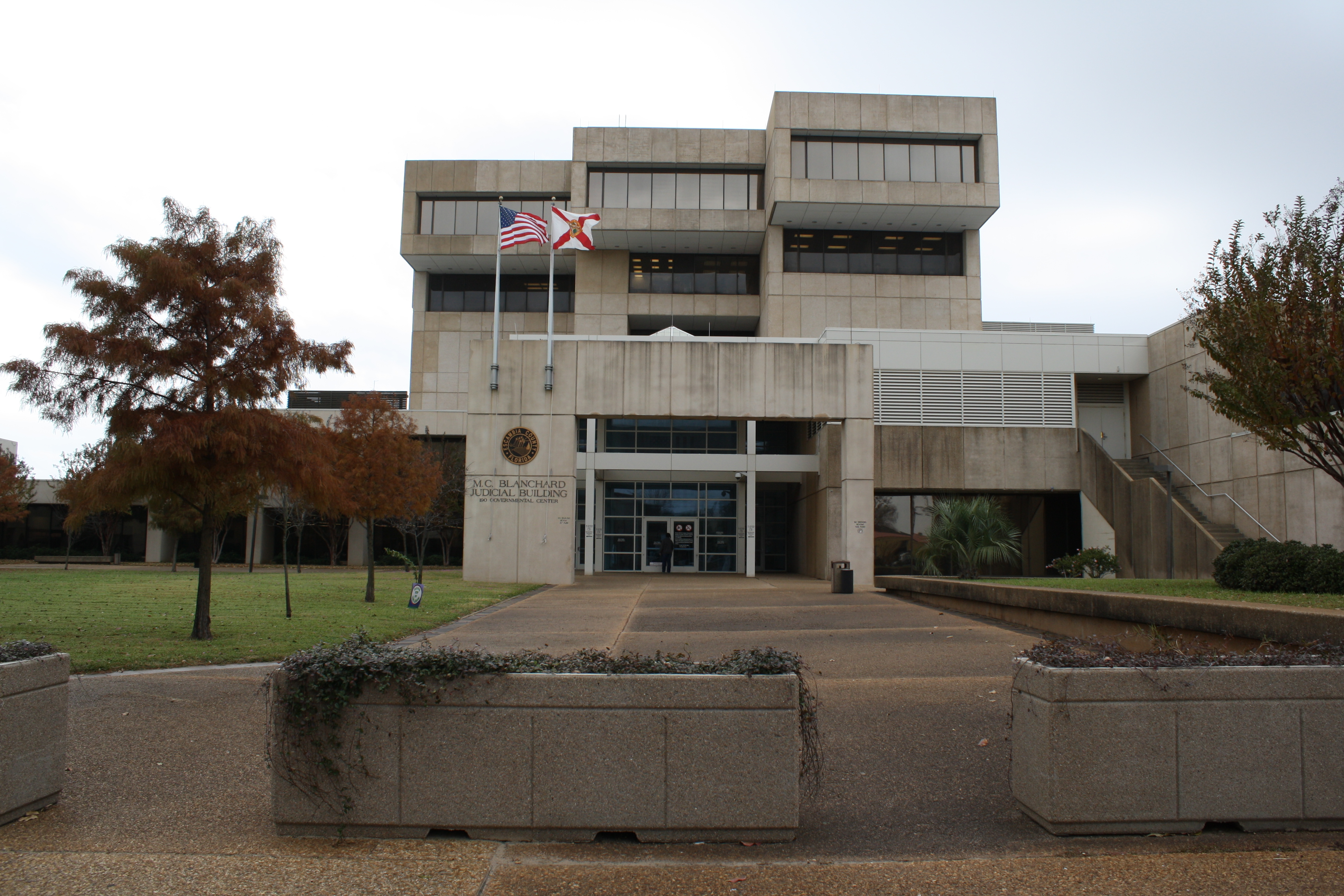
- Escambia County Courthouse

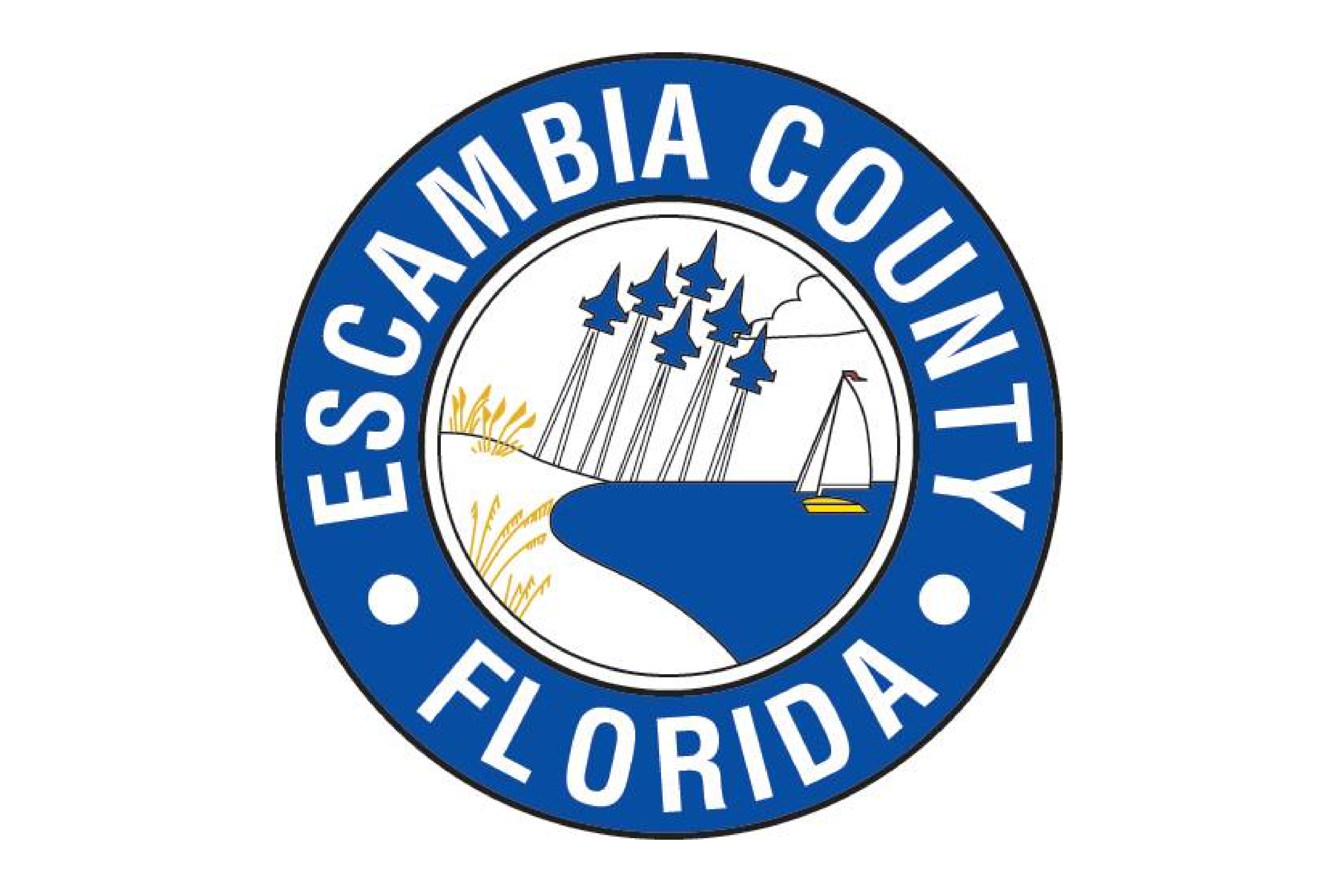
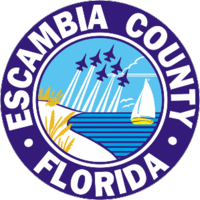
- Flag Seal

- Location within the U.S. state of Florida
- Coordinates: 30°37′N 87°20′W
- Country: United States
- State: Florida
- Founded: July 21, 1821
- Named for: Escambia River
- Seat: Pensacola
- Largest city: Pensacola

Government
  - County Administrator: Wes Moreno

Area
  - Total: 875 sq mi (2,270 km^{2})
  - Land: 656 sq mi (1,700 km^{2})
  - Water: 218 sq mi (560 km^{2}) 25.0%

Population (2020)
  - Total: 321,905
  - Estimate (2025): 333,834 ▲
  - Density: 491/sq mi (189/km^{2})
- Time zone: UTC−6 (Central)
  - Summer (DST): UTC−5 (CDT)
- Congressional district: 1st
- Website: http://myescambia.com

Escambia County is in the northwest region of the U.S. state of Florida, and is the state's oldest county. As of the 2020 census, the population was 321,905. The county seat and only city is Pensacola. Escambia County is included within the Pensacola Metropolitan Statistical Area. The county population has steadily increased as the City of Pensacola and its surrounding bedroom communities continue to grow with residential and commercial development.

== History ==
The area had been inhabited for thousands of years by indigenous peoples of varying cultures. Historic American Indian tribes at the time of European-American settlement were the Pensacola and Muscogee, known among the English as the Creek.

Escambia County had been part of Spanish colonial settlement before the United States acquired it in 1818. The county was organized by European-Americans on July 21, 1821; it was named for the Escambia River. The name Escambia is taken from the Escambia river. The word "Escambia" may have been derived from the Creek name Shambia, meaning "clear water". The Choctaw were another major tribe in the Southeast.

Created on the same date, Escambia and St. Johns Counties were Florida's two original counties, covering the entire territory within modern state boundaries. The Suwannee River was the border between them, following a winding path from the northern border of the state to the Gulf of Mexico. Essentially, the Escambia county government had jurisdiction over the "panhandle" and "big bend" areas, and St. Johns over the remainder of the entire state.

As population increased in the frontier territory, 21 counties were later organized from Escambia county directly or indirectly. They include Jackson (1821), Gadsden (created from Jackson)(1823), Leon (1824), Walton (1824), Washington (created from Jackson and Walton)(1825), Hamilton (1827), Jefferson (1827), Madison (created from Jefferson) (1827), Franklin (1832), Calhoun (1838), Santa Rosa (1842), Wakulla (created from Leon) (1843), Holmes (created from Jackson and Walton) (1848), Liberty (created from Gadsden) (1855), Lafayette and Taylor (created from Madison) (1856), Bay (created from Washington) (1913), Okaloosa (created from Santa Rosa and Walton) (1915), Dixie (created from Lafayette) (1921), and Gulf (created from Calhoun) (1925). The number of counties in Florida since 1925 has been stable at 67.

== Geography ==
According to the U.S. Census Bureau, the county has an area of 875 square miles (2,270 km^{2}), of which 656 square miles (1,700 km^{2}) is land and 218 square miles (560 km^{2}) (25.0%) is water.

The county jurisdiction includes the island of Santa Rosa south of Pensacola; it is not part of Santa Rosa County proper. Escambia County is part of the Pensacola-Ferry Pass-Brent Metropolitan Statistical Area.

=== Adjacent counties ===
- Escambia County, Alabama — north
- Santa Rosa County, Florida — east
- Baldwin County, Alabama — west

Escambia County, Florida, and Escambia County, Alabama, are two of 22 counties or parishes in the United States with the same name to border each other across state lines. Culturally, Escambia County, as well as the entirety of the Florida Panhandle (or more specifically West Florida) is sometimes called “Lower Alabama” due to its physical and cultural proximity to the State of Alabama.

=== National protected areas ===
- Gulf Islands National Seashore (part)

== Demographics ==
Historical population
Census	Pop.	Note	%±
1830	3,386		—
1840	3,993		17.9%
1850	4,351		9.0%
1860	5,768		32.6%
1870	7,817		35.5%
1880	12,156		55.5%
1890	20,188		66.1%
1900	28,313		40.2%
1910	38,029		34.3%
1920	49,386		29.9%
1930	53,594		8.5%
1940	74,667		39.3%
1950	112,706		50.9%
1960	173,829		54.2%
1970	205,334		18.1%
1980	233,794		13.9%
1990	262,798		12.4%
2000	294,410		12.0%
2010	297,619		1.1%
2020	321,905		8.2%
2025 (est.)	333,834	▲	3.7%
U.S. Decennial Census; 1790-1960 1900-1990; 1990-2000 2010-2020 2020

=== Racial and ethnic composition ===
Escambia County, Florida – Racial and ethnic composition Note: the US Census treats Hispanic/Latino as an ethnic category. This table excludes Latinos from the racial categories and assigns them to a separate category. Hispanics/Latinos may be of any race.
Race / Ethnicity (NH = Non-Hispanic)	Pop 1980	Pop 1990	Pop 2000	Pop 2010	Pop 2020	% 1980	% 1990	% 2000	% 2010	% 2020
White alone (NH)	179,172	198,083	208,678	196,901	200,962	76.64%	75.37%	70.88%	66.16%	62.43%
Black or African American alone (NH)	45,501	52,333	62,548	67,443	68,148	19.46%	19.91%	21.25%	22.66%	21.17%
Native American or Alaska Native alone (NH)	1,876	2,552	2,525	2,384	1,998	0.80%	0.97%	0.86%	0.80%	0.62%
Asian alone (NH)	3,036	4,745	6,440	8,015	9,866	1.30%	1.81%	2.19%	2.69%	3.06%
Native Hawaiian or Pacific Islander alone (NH)	x	x	321	400	410	x	x	0.11%	0.13%	0.13%
Other race alone (NH)	322	72	420	472	1,771	0.14%	0.03%	0.14%	0.16%	0.55%
Mixed race or Multiracial (NH)	x	x	5,543	7,943	17,957	x	x	1.88%	2.67%	5.58%
Hispanic or Latino (any race)	3,887	5,013	7,935	14,061	20,793	1.66%	1.91%	2.70%	4.72%	6.46%
Total	233,794	262,798	294,410	297,619	321,905	100.00%	100.00%	100.00%	100.00%	100.00%

A map of racial demographics in Escambia County, Florida by Census tract Legend: Non-Hispanic White 30–40% 40–50% 50–60% 60–70% 70–80% 80–90% >90% Black or African American 40–50% 50–60% 60–70%

=== 2020 census ===
As of the 2020 census, the county had a population of 321,905. The median age was 39.6 years. 19.8% of residents were under the age of 18 and 18.9% of residents were 65 years of age or older. For every 100 females there were 96.8 males, and for every 100 females age 18 and over there were 95.1 males age 18 and over.

There were 128,160 households in the county, of which 26.2% had children under the age of 18 living in them. Of all households, 41.2% were married-couple households, 19.9% were households with a male householder and no spouse or partner present, and 31.9% were households with a female householder and no spouse or partner present. About 30.3% of all households were made up of individuals and 12.4% had someone living alone who was 65 years of age or older. There were 74,083 families residing in the county.

There were 145,390 housing units, of which 11.9% were vacant. Among occupied housing units, 63.1% were owner-occupied and 36.9% were renter-occupied. The homeowner vacancy rate was 2.0% and the rental vacancy rate was 12.5%.

The racial makeup of the county was 64.3% White, 21.4% Black or African American, 0.7% American Indian and Alaska Native, 3.1% Asian, 0.1% Native Hawaiian and Pacific Islander, 2.3% from some other race, and 8.0% from two or more races. Hispanic or Latino residents of any race comprised 6.5% of the population.

92.4% of residents lived in urban areas, while 7.6% lived in rural areas.

=== 2010 Census ===
At the 2010 census there were 297,619 people, 116,238 households, and 74,040 families living in the county. The population density was 449 inhabitants per square mile (173/km^{2}). There were 136,703 housing units at an average density of 206 per square mile (80/km^{2}). The racial makeup of the county was 68.9% White, 22.9% Black or African American, 0.9% Native American, 2.7% Asian, 0.1% Pacific Islander, 1.3% from other races, and 3.2% from two or more races. 4.7% of the population were Hispanic or Latino of any race. Of the 116,238 households 25.5% had children under the age of 18 living with them, 42.5% were married couples living together, 4.8% had a male householder with no wife present, 16.3% had a female householder with no husband present, and 36.3% were non-families. 28.9% of households were one person and 10.2% were one person aged 65 or older. The average household size was 2.41 and the average family size was 2.96.

The age distribution was 21.6% under the age of 18, 13.0% from 18 to 24, 24.2% from 25 to 44, 26.8% from 45 to 64, and 14.4% 65 or older. The median age was 35 years. For every 100 females, there were 98.60 males. For every 100 females age 18 and over, there were 97.10 males.

The median household income was $43,707 and the median family income was $54,543. Males had a median income of $38,878 versus $30,868 for females. The per capita income for the county was $23,773. About 12.7% of families and 16.9% of the population were below the poverty line, including 26.4% of those under age 18 and 9.2% of those age 65 or over.

=== 2000 Census ===
At the 2000 census there were 294,410 people, 111,049 households, and 74,180 families living in the county. The population density was 444 inhabitants per square mile (171/km^{2}). There were 124,647 housing units at an average density of 188 per square mile (73/km^{2}). The racial makeup of the county was 72.4% White, 21.4% Black or African American, 0.9% Native American, 2.2% Asian, 0.1% Pacific Islander, 0.9% from other races, and 2.2% from two or more races. 2.7% of the population were Hispanic or Latino of any race. Of the 111,049 households 29.9% had children under the age of 18 living with them, 47.8% were married couples living together, 15.1% had a female householder with no husband present, and 33.2% were non-families. 26.9% of households were one person and 9.7% were one person aged 65 or older. The average household size was 2.45 and the average family size was 2.98.

The age distribution was 23.5% under the age of 18, 12.2% from 18 to 24, 29.0% from 25 to 44, 22.0% from 45 to 64, and 13.3% 65 or older. The median age was 35 years. For every 100 females, there were 98.60 males. For every 100 females age 18 and over, there were 97.10 males.

The median household income was $35,234 and the median family income was $41,708. Males had a median income of $31,054 versus $22,023 for females. The per capita income for the county was $18,641. About 12.1% of families and 15.4% of the population were below the poverty line, including 23.7% of those under age 18 and 9.6% of those age 65 or over.

== Education ==
Public primary and secondary education schools in Pensacola are administered by the Escambia County School District, the county's only school district.

The University of West Florida, Pensacola State College, and Pensacola Christian College are in Escambia County.

== Media ==
=== Newspapers ===
The largest daily print newspaper in the area is the Pensacola News Journal. There is also a weekly print newspaper, The Independent News.

=== Television ===
Two major networks broadcast from Pensacola on WEAR-TV: ABC on DT1 and NBC on DT2. Several major networks are broadcast from nearby Mobile, such as CBS affiliate WKRG, Roar affiliate WPMI-TV, and Fox affiliate WALA. The following is a list of broadcast television stations in the Mobile, Alabama – Pensacola – Fort Walton Beach, Florida market. Cox Communications provides cable television service in the county's urbanized areas, and television advertising through its subsidiary, Cox Media. Spectrum holds the cable television franchise for the county's mainland rural areas, while Mediacom serves the Pensacola Beach community on Santa Rosa Island.

- WALA
- WAWD
- WFNA
- WBQP-CD
- WEAR-TV
- WEIQ
- WFBD
- WFGX
- WHBR
- WJTC
- WKRG-TV
- WMPV-TV
- WPAN
- WPMI-TV
- WSRE

=== Radio ===
Radio stations in the Pensacola / Mobile market:

== Transportation ==
=== Airports ===
- Coastal Airport
- Ferguson Airport
- Pensacola International Airport

=== Transit ===
Escambia County is served by buses run by Escambia County Area Transit.

=== Major highways ===
- I-10 / SR 8
- I-110 / SR 8A
- US 29 / SR 95
- US 90 / SR 10 / SR 10A
- US 90 Alt. / SR 10
- US 98 / SR 30
- US 98 Bus.
- SR 4
- SR 97
- SR 99
- SR 173
- SR 289
- SR 291
- SR 292
- SR 295
- SR 296

=== Railroads ===
Pensacola was a scheduled stop on the route of Amtrak's Los Angeles-Orlando Sunset Limited from 1993 to 2005, when damage to railroad bridges and tracks caused by Hurricane Katrina resulted in cancellation of the route east of New Orleans. Escambia County has had no passenger train service since then.

Before the creation of Amtrak in 1971, Pensacola was served by the New Orleans-Jacksonville Gulf Wind, operated jointly by the Louisville and Nashville Railroad and the Seaboard Air Line Railroad (predecessors of CSX).

The following freight railroads serve Escambia County:

- CSX from Flomaton, Alabama, to Pensacola
- Florida Gulf & Atlantic Railroad, which acquired most of the CSX main line from Pensacola to Jacksonville on June 1, 2019
- Alabama & Gulf Coast Railway from Amory, Mississippi, to Pensacola (predecessor: the Frisco Railway).

== Library ==
Escambia County is served by the West Florida Regional Library System.

== Government ==
Escambia County government is led by a five-member Board of County Commissioners. Each is elected from a single-member district. The county commission appoints a professional county administrator as chief administrative officer of the county.

The chief law enforcement authority of Escambia County is the Escambia County Sheriff's Office, also an elective office. The sheriff of Escambia County is Chip Simmons, elected in 2020.

The fire protection arm of the Escambia County is the Escambia County Fire Rescue (Florida).

=== Board of County Commissioners ===
Escambia County is divided into five districts. One county commissioner is elected from each district to serve a four-year term. Commissioners are chosen in partisan elections by voters from the districts in which they live. The board appoints a county administrator to be chief administrative officer of the county, responsible to the commission for the orderly operations of matters within the board's jurisdiction. The current office holders are,

- Escambia County District 1: Steve Stroberger
- Escambia County District 2: Mike Kohler (chair)
- Escambia County District 3: Lumon May
- Escambia County District 4: Ashlee Hofberger
- Escambia County District 5: Steven Barry
- Escambia County administrator: Wes Moreno
- Escambia County assistant administrator: Debbie Bowers
- Escambia County assistant administrator: Wesley Hall
- Escambia County attorney: Alison P. Rogers

=== County jail ===
In 2011, the US Justice Department’s Civil Rights Division issued a letter detailing the results of its investigation into conditions at Escambia County Jail, which houses roughly 1,300 prisoners. The department found that, although Sheriff David Morgan had recently implemented a series of reforms, conditions at the jail still routinely violated prisoners' constitutional rights.

Specifically, the department concluded that known systemic deficiencies, stemming mainly from staffing shortages, subjected prisoners to excessive risk of assault by other prisoners and to inadequate mental health care. Additionally, the department found that, until recently, the jail had an informal policy and practice of segregating its housing units, reserving one for African-American prisoners. According to the Department of Justice, this race-based segregation stigmatized and discriminated against many of the prisoners, and aggravated racial tensions in the jail. Between April 2012 and March 2013, the prison recorded 176 inmate-on-inmate assaults, including 20 serious head wounds.

The investigation released a letter of findings:

- Prisoner-on-prisoner assaults are a common occurrence at the jail, making the Facility unsafe for prisoners. Assaults occur routinely primarily because of a shortage of correctional staff. The facility needs more staff to patrol jail pods, intervene when altercations or fights break out, and search cells for dangerous items that could be used as weapons against fellow prisoners;
- A staffing study released in March 2011 commissioned by county leadership has given Jail leadership good reason to know that staffing shortages pose a significant risk to prisoner safety. Among other findings, the study concluded that: the jail "is operating with only about three-fourths of its needed staff; that "the [j]ail has been understaffed for many years;" that "[d]eputies ... are routinely borrowed from other jobs which results in leaving their posts unmanned;" that "[t]he frequency of some important operations, such as cell searches, is reduced due to lack of staff to conduct the searches;" that "[p]osts are understaffed or not staffed at all;" and that, "[l]arge insufficiencies in jail staffing ... raise the likelihood that something serious could happen that would overwhelm the jail's ability to respond;"
- The Jail's leadership fails to appropriately monitor and track prisoner-on-prisoner violence and staff-on-prisoner uses of force;
- The jail's decades-long practice of housing some prisoners in housing units designated as only for black prisoners ("black-only pods") racially discriminates against African-Americans, contributes to prisoner perceptions that the jail favors white prisoners over black prisoners, and reduces safety by exacerbating racial tensions among prisoners at the Facility;
- Prisoners are not given timely and adequate access to appropriately skilled mental health care professionals;
- The jail routinely fails to provide appropriate medications to prisoners with mental illness;
- The jail provides inadequate housing and observation for prisoners with serious mental illness and/or at risk of self-injury, including suicide; and
- On average, the jail sends roughly one prisoner per month to the hospital after an incident of self-injury, a rate judged indicative of an inadequate mental health program.

The Department of Justice concluded from these facts that Escambia County Jail's practices violated the fourteenth amendment's due process protections for pre-trial detainees, as well as the eighth amendment's protections for those convicted of a criminal offense. Jail officials must refrain from showing deliberate indifference to conditions of confinement posing an excessive risk of harm to prisoners.

Roy L. Austin Jr., deputy assistant attorney general of the Civil Rights Division, commended Sheriff Morgan for his willingness to remedy problems identified during the course of the investigation. The department conducted this investigation under the Civil Rights of Institutionalized Persons Act (CRIPA) to enforce constitutional mandates. The department's investigation was broad-based.

The investigation was conducted by Special Litigation Counsel Avner Shapiro and Senior Trial Attorney David Deutsch of the Civil Rights Division's Special Litigation Section. The findings letter is available on the department's website.

== Communities ==
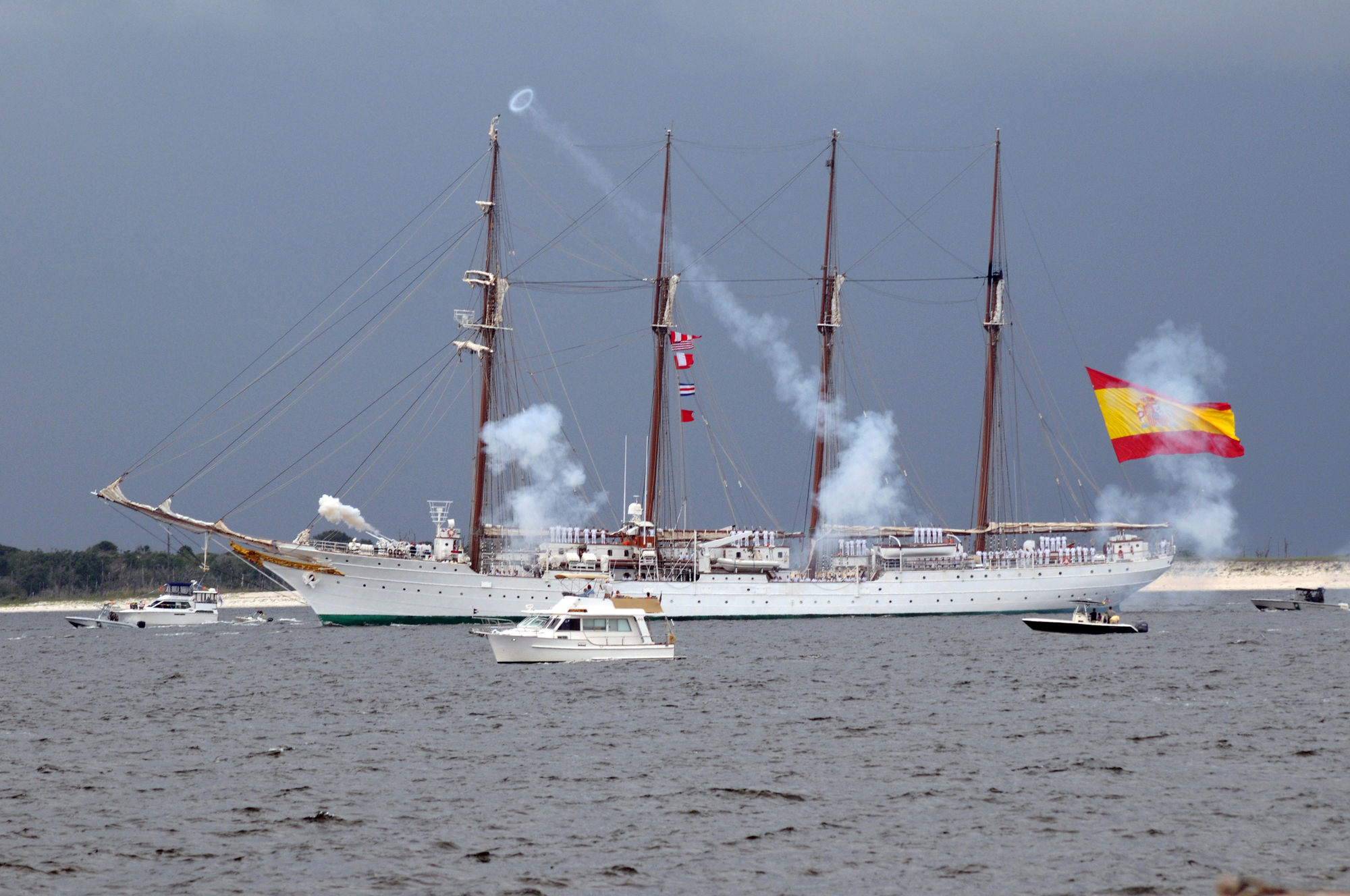
Juan Sebastian de Elcano, a Spanish tall ship, initiates a 21-gun salute in honor of the city of Pensacola's 450th anniversary in 2009.

=== City ===
- Pensacola

=== Town ===
- Century

=== Census-designated places ===
- Bellview
- Brent
- Ensley
- Ferry Pass
- Gonzalez
- Goulding
- Molino
- Myrtle Grove
- Pensacola Station
- Warrington
- West Pensacola

=== Other unincorporated communities ===
- Barrineau Park
- Barth
- Beulah
- Bluff Springs
- Bogia
- Bratt
- Brownsville
- Cantonment
- Innerarity Point
- McDavid
- Millview
- Oak Grove
- Pensacola Beach
- Perdido Key
- Pleasant Grove
- Walnut Hill

=== Ghost towns ===
- Muscogee
- Pine Barren

== Politics ==
=== Voter registration ===
According to the secretary of state's office, Republicans constitute a plurality of registered voters in Escambia County.

Escambia County voter registration & party enrollment as of September 30, 2022
Political party	Total voters	Percentage
Republican	98,987	44.25%
Democratic	71,746	32.07%
No party affiliation	48,734	21.78%
Minor parties	4,252	1.90%
Total	223,719	100.00%

=== Statewide elections ===
Escambia County is very conservative for an urban county. Before 1994, the area traditionally voted Democratic in local elections and sent Democrats to the U.S. House of Representatives and the state legislature, like most of the Western Panhandle. This was particularly the case in the decades of the 20th century when most African Americans were disenfranchised by the state constitution until the federal Voting Rights Act passed.

In 1994 incumbent representative Earl Hutto declined to run for reelection. That year, Republican Joe Scarborough was elected to the House of Representatives.

Voters of the county have not supported a Democratic presidential candidate since John F. Kennedy in 1960. In 1964, a majority of the county's voters supported Republican nominee Barry Goldwater. In 1968, third-party candidate George Wallace won Escambia County with 54% of the vote. In 1972, Republican Richard Nixon received 80% of the vote. Since 1972, Republican nominees in every presidential election have won an absolute majority in Escambia County, but in recent years, the Democratic Party has increased its share of the presidential vote. In 2020, Joe Biden was the first Democratic presidential nominee to win over 40% of the county's vote since Jimmy Carter in 1976. Growth in the Pensacola suburbs as well as the sizable black population has made Escambia County the least Republican-leaning of the Western Panhandle counties. In the 2025 1st district special election Gay Valimont won it by 3 points.

United States presidential election results for Escambia County, Florida
Year	Republican		Democratic		Third party(ies)	
Year	No.	%	No.	%	No.	%
1892	0	0.00%	2,616	95.37%	127	4.63%
1896	233	13.97%	1,285	77.04%	150	8.99%
1900	432	19.11%	1,435	63.47%	394	17.43%
1904	497	23.02%	1,573	72.86%	89	4.12%
1908	718	21.39%	1,887	56.23%	751	22.38%
1912	72	3.48%	1,593	77.11%	401	19.41%
1916	416	15.05%	2,183	78.95%	166	6.00%
1920	1,227	22.96%	3,485	65.20%	633	11.84%
1924	1,274	29.34%	2,290	52.74%	778	17.92%
1928	4,443	53.32%	3,772	45.27%	118	1.42%
1932	1,658	21.15%	6,182	78.85%	0	0.00%
1936	1,567	14.64%	9,138	85.36%	0	0.00%
1940	2,249	12.19%	16,201	87.81%	0	0.00%
1944	3,191	16.42%	16,240	83.58%	0	0.00%
1948	3,267	14.75%	13,982	63.11%	4,907	22.15%
1952	12,176	37.27%	20,495	62.73%	0	0.00%
1956	13,227	37.21%	22,320	62.79%	0	0.00%
1960	17,925	38.79%	28,288	61.21%	0	0.00%
1964	32,414	56.09%	25,371	43.91%	0	0.00%
1968	15,089	22.07%	16,281	23.81%	37,000	54.12%
1972	56,071	79.57%	14,078	19.98%	315	0.45%
1976	41,471	51.38%	38,279	47.42%	965	1.20%
1980	51,794	58.49%	33,513	37.84%	3,252	3.67%
1984	66,715	71.32%	26,812	28.66%	22	0.02%
1988	64,959	68.05%	29,977	31.40%	524	0.55%
1992	52,868	50.24%	32,045	30.45%	20,308	19.30%
1996	60,997	56.52%	37,838	35.06%	9,090	8.42%
2000	73,171	62.62%	40,990	35.08%	2,695	2.31%
2004	93,566	65.30%	48,329	33.73%	1,383	0.97%
2008	91,411	59.02%	61,572	39.76%	1,891	1.22%
2012	88,711	59.55%	58,185	39.06%	2,071	1.39%
2016	88,808	57.60%	57,461	37.27%	7,903	5.13%
2020	96,674	56.58%	70,929	41.51%	3,253	1.90%
2024	96,407	59.23%	64,601	39.69%	1,747	1.07%

United States Senate election results for Escambia County, Florida1
Year	Republican		Democratic		Third party(ies)	
Year	No.	%	No.	%	No.	%
2024	98,502	60.91%	60,111	37.17%	3,108	1.92%

United States Senate election results for Escambia County, Florida3
Year	Republican		Democratic		Third party(ies)	
Year	No.	%	No.	%	No.	%
2022	73,225	63.40%	40,790	35.32%	1,473	1.28%

Florida Gubernatorial election results for Escambia County
Year	Republican		Democratic		Third party(ies)	
Year	No.	%	No.	%	No.	%
1994	45,261	57.68%	33,210	42.32%	1	0.00%
1998	50,325	66.83%	24,956	33.14%	23	0.03%
2002	60,095	64.92%	31,844	34.40%	633	0.68%
2006	51,195	59.09%	33,777	38.98%	1,674	1.93%
2010	54,607	56.93%	36,873	38.44%	4,436	4.62%
2014	60,719	61.99%	33,434	34.13%	3,798	3.88%
2018	74,719	57.76%	52,835	40.84%	1,812	1.40%
2022	74,608	64.46%	40,076	34.63%	1,053	0.91%

== See also ==
- National Register of Historic Places listings in Escambia County, Florida
- Florida Panhandle

== Sources incorporated into this article ==
This article incorporates public domain material from Justice Department Finds Unconstitutional Conditions of Confinement at Escambia County, Fla. United States Department of Justice.

This article incorporates public domain material from Findings Letter of Investigation of Escambia County Jail (PDF). United States Department of Justice.
