= List of county roads in Escambia County, Florida =

- County road shields used in Florida

Highway names
- Interstates: Interstate X (I-X)
- US Highways: U.S. Highway X (US X)
- State: State Road X (SR X)
- County: County Road X (CR-X)

System links
- County roads in Florida; County roads in Escambia County

The following is a list of county roads in Escambia County, Florida. All county roads are maintained by the county in which they reside.

== County roads ==
#	Road Name(s)	Direction and Termini					Notes		
CR 4		W/E	SR 97	Davisville	US 29 (SR 95)	Century	Former SR 4		
CR 4A	Byrneville Road; State Line Road	W/E	CR 4 / Byrneville Road US 29 (SR 95)	Byrneville Century	US 29 (SR 95) CR 4A	Century North-northwest of Century	Former SR 4A		
CR 95A	Palafox Street	S/N	US 29 (SR 95) US 29 (SR 95)	Brent Cantonment	US 29 (SR 95) US 29 (SR 95)	Cantonment–Gonzalez line North-northwest of Molino	Former SR 95A		
CR 97	Jacks Branch Road	S/N	CR 297A CR 184	Cantonment Cantonment	CR 184 CR 99 / Barrineau Park Road	Cantonment Barrineau Park	Former SR 97		
CR 97A	Pine Forest Road	CR 97	Jacks Branch Road	S/N	CR 297A CR 184	Cantonment Cantonment	CR 184 CR 99 / Barrineau Park Road	Cantonment Barrineau Park	Former SR 97
CR 97A	Pine Forest Road	S/N	CR 99	Bay Springs	CR 99A / Pine Forest Road	Walnut Hill	Former SR 97A		
CR 99	Beulah Road; Frank Reeder Road	S/N	US 90 Alt. (SR 10) / Beulah Road Bridlewood Road / Frank Reeder Road CR 97 / Barrineau Park Road SR 97	West of Ensley West-northwest of Ensley Barrineau Park East of Walnut Hill	CR 184 / River Annex Road CR 99 / Frank Reeder Road SR 97 CR 8 / State Line Road	Muscogee West-northwest of Ensley East of Walnut Hill Alabama state line west-northwest of Century	Former SR 99		
CR 99A	Arthur Brown Road	W/E	Pineville Road	Pineville	CR 99	East-northeast of Walnut Hill	Former SR 99A		
CR 164		W/E	SR 97	North-northeast of Walnut Hill	US 29 (SR 95)	McDavid	Former SR 164		
CR 168		W/E	CR 99	West of Century	CR 4A	North of Byrneville	Former SR 168		
CR 173	Blue Angel Parkway	S/N	SR 173 / CR 296	Bellview	SR 297 / Longleaf Drive	Bellview	Extension of SR 173; signed as SR 173		
CR 182	Barth Road; Molino Road	W/E	CR 99 / Molino Road	North of Barrineau Park	CR 95	Molino	Former SR 182		
CR 184	Muscogee Road; Quintette Road	W/E	CR 112 US 29 (SR 95)	Alabama state line west-northwest of Muscogee North of Cantonment	US 29 (SR 95) / Becks Lake Road CR 184	Cantonment Santa Rosa County line south-southeast of Molino	Former SR 184		
CR 186	Kingsfield Road	W/E	CR 97 / Kingsfield Road	West of Gonzalez	CR 749 / Kingsfield Road	Gonzalez	Former SR 186		
CR 196		W/E	CR 97	Southeast of Barrineau Park	CR 95A	South of Molino	Former SR 196		
CR 290	Olive Road	W/E	CR 95A	Ensley	US 90 (SR 10A)	Ferry Pass	Former SR 290		
CR 292	Chemstrand Road	S/N	US 90 Alt. (SR 10) / Chemstrand Road	Ensley	CR 749 / Ten Mile Road	Ensley–Gonzalez line			
CR 292A	Gulf Beach Highway; Innerarity Point Road	W/E	Innerarity Point Road SR 292	West of Gulf Beach Heights Warrington	SR 292 SR 295 / Sunset Avenue	Warrington Warrington	Former SR 297 and SR 292A		
CR 293	Bauer Road	S/N	CR 292A / Bauer Road	Chanticleer	US 98 (SR 30)	East-southeast of Perdido Heights	Former SR 293		
CR 295A	Old Corry Field Road	S/N	SR 292 / Live Oak Avenue	Warrington	New Warrington Road	West Pensacola	Former SR 295A		
CR 296	Saufley Field Road	W/E	East Fence Road	Bellview	US 90 (SR 10A) / SR 296	Bellview	Former SR 296		
CR 296A	Cerny Road	W/E	SR 173	Bellview	CR 341	Bellview	Former SR 296A		
CR 297	Dog Track Road; Pine Forest Road; West Roberts Road	S/N	SR 292 CR 173 US 90 Alt. (SR 10) / SR 297	Warrington Bellview Ensley	US 98 (SR 30) / SR 298 US 90 (SR 10A) US 29 (SR 95)	South-southeast of Halcyon Shores Bellview Gonzalez	Former SR 297		
CR 297A	Louis Street	S/N	CR 297	Ensley	CR 184	Cantonment	Former SR 297A		
CR 298A	Jackson Street	W/E					former SR 298A		
CR 341	Marlane Drive	W/E	CR 296A	Bellview	US 90 (SR 10A)	Bellview			
CR 399	Fort Pickens Park Road; Pensacola Beach Boulevard; Via de Luna Drive	W/E	SR 399	Pensacola Beach	CR 399	Santa Rosa County line in Pensacola Beach	Former SR 399		
CR 443	North E Street	S/N	US 90 (SR 10A) / North E Street	Pensacola	SR 752	Goulding–Brent line	Former SR 443		
CR 453	W Street	S/N	US 98 (SR 30)	Pensacola	US 29 (SR 95)	Brent	Former SR 453		
CR 465	Hope Drive		US 29 (SR 95)	Ensley	West Detroit Boulevard / Untreiner Avenue	Ensley			
CR 489	Stefani Road; Tate Road	S/N	US 90 Alt. (SR 10)	Ensley	CR 297	Gonzalez	Former SR 489		
CR 493	North T Street	S/N	US 90 (SR 10A) / North T Street	Pensacola	SR 295	West Pensacola–Brent	Former SR 493		
CR 498	Copter Road	W/E	US 90 Alt. (SR 10)	Ferry Pass	Arand Drive / Copter Road	Ferry Pass			
CR 749	Chemstrand Road; Old Chemstrand Road	S/N	CR 292 / Ten Mile Road	Ensley–Gonzalez line	US 29 (SR 95)	Gonzalez	Former SR 749		
