= Pensacola metropolitan area =

- Metropolitan Statistical Area
- Pensacola–Ferry Pass–Brent, FL; Metropolitan Statistical Area
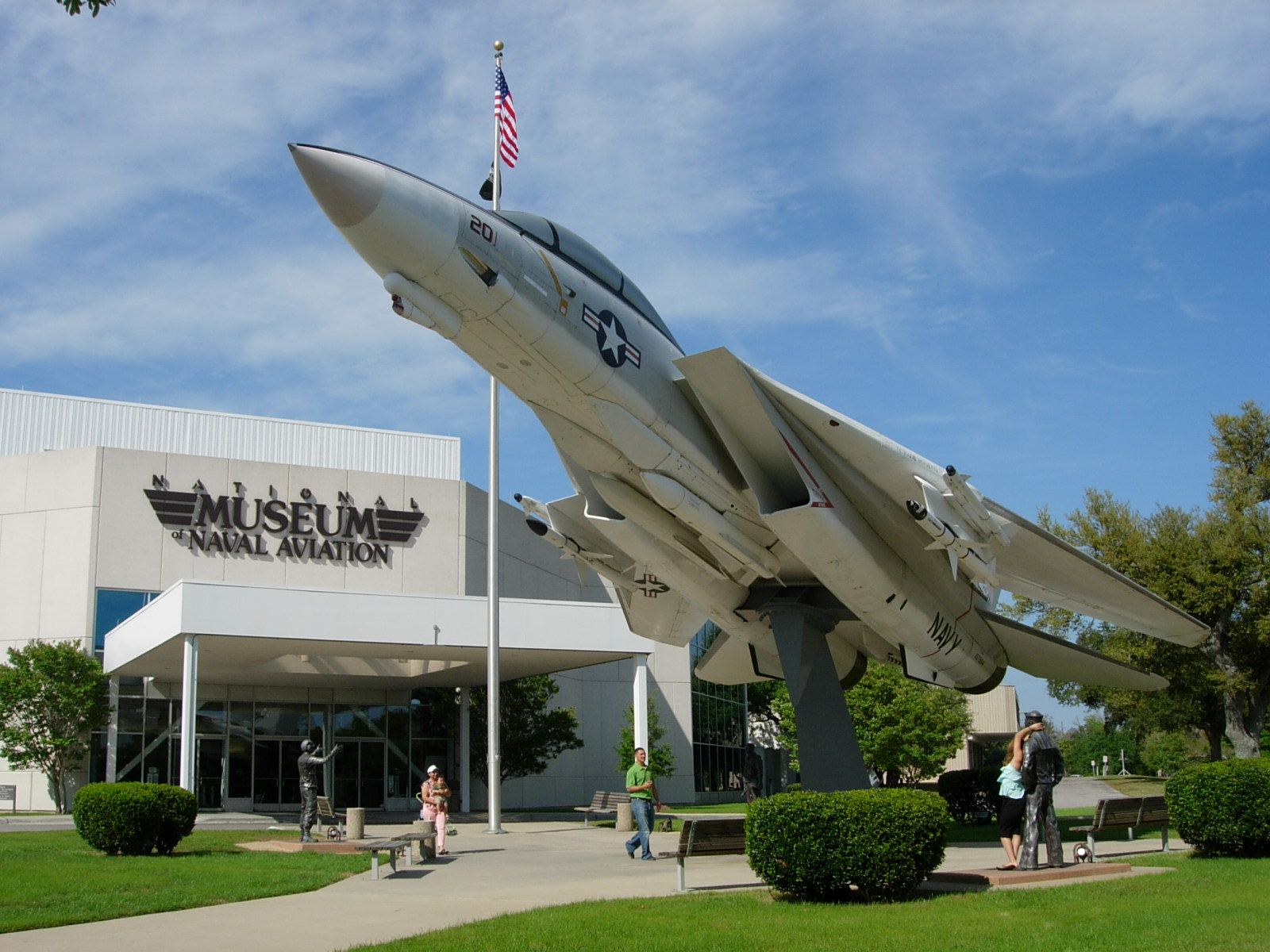
- F-14A Tomcat in front of the National Naval Aviation Museum
Interactive Map of Florida Panhandle
with inset of Pensacola MSA
City of Pensacola
Ferry Pass CDP
Brent CDP
Pensacola–Ferry Pass–Brent, FL MSA
Crestview–Ft. Walton Beach–Destin, FL MSA
Panama City–Panama City Beach, FL MSA
- Country: United States
- State(s): Florida
- Largest city: Pensacola
- Other cities: Navarre; Gulf Breeze; Milton; Jay; Pace; Ensley; Warrington; Brent; Ferry Pass; McDavid; Pensacola Beach; Cantonment; Perdido Key; Myrtle Grove; Walnut Hill; West Pensacola; Molino; Innerarity Point; Goulding; Gonzalez; Barrineau Park

Area
  - Total: 2,049 sq mi (5,310 km^{2})
- Highest elevation: 290.0 ft (88.39 m)

Population (2020 census)
  - Total: 511,503
  - Rank: 110 in the U.S.
  - Density: 598.3/sq mi (230.99/km^{2})

GDP
  - Total: $27.080 billion (2022)
- Time zone: UTC-6 (CST)
  - Summer (DST): UTC-5 (CDT)

The Pensacola metropolitan area is the metropolitan area centered on Pensacola, Florida. It is also known as the Pensacola–Ferry Pass–Brent Metropolitan Statistical Area, a metropolitan statistical area (MSA) used for statistical purposes by the United States Census Bureau and other agencies. The Pensacola Standard Metropolitan Statistical Area was first defined in 1958, with Pensacola as the principal city, and included Escambia and Santa Rosa counties. The MSA was renamed Pensacola–Ferry Pass–Brent MSA in 2003, with the unincorporated census-designated places Ferry Pass and Brent added as principal cities. The population of the MSA in the 2020 census was 511,502.

The five incorporated cities within the MSA are Pensacola (Population: 54,312), Milton (10,197), Gulf Breeze (6,302), Century (1,713), and Jay (524). In addition, several unincorporated census-designated places account for a great number of the population. Most notable is Navarre (43,540); its population makes it the second largest community in the metro area, only behind Pensacola.

== Demographics ==
County	Seat	2025 estimate	2020 Census	Change	Land area	Density
Escambia	Pensacola	333,834	321,905	+3.71%	656 sq mi (1,700 km^{2})	509/sq mi (196/km^{2})
Santa Rosa	Milton	211,115	188,000	+12.30%	1,012 sq mi (2,620 km^{2})	209/sq mi (81/km^{2})
Total		544,949	509,905	+6.87%	1,668 sq mi (4,320 km^{2})	327/sq mi (126/km^{2})

As of the census of 2020, there were 509,905 people residing within the MSA. The racial makeup of the MSA was 70.2% White, 15.7% African American, 0.7% Native American, 2.7% Asian, 0.2% Pacific Islander, 2.2% from other races, and 8.3% from two or more races. Hispanic or Latino of any race were 6.4% of the population.

== Economy ==
=== Personal income ===
The median income for a household in the MSA was $38,558, and the median income for a family was $44,319. Males had a median income of $32,966 versus $22,164 for females. The per capita income for the MSA was $19,365.

=== Tourism ===
Tourism in the Pensacola Bay area brings in about $552 million annually. Palafox Place contains multiple venues for nightlife.

==== Beaches ====
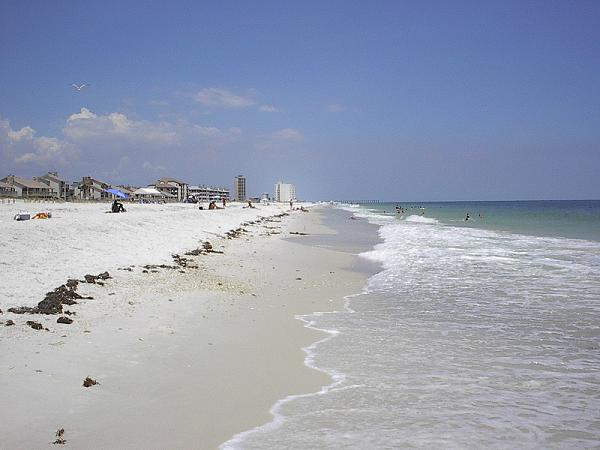
Pensacola Beach

- Pensacola Beach
- Navarre Beach
- Perdido Key

=== Retail ===
- Cordova Mall
- University Town Plaza

== Transportation ==
=== Commercial airports ===
Airport	IATA code	ICAO code	County
Pensacola International Airport	PNS	KPNS	Escambia

=== Interstate Highways ===
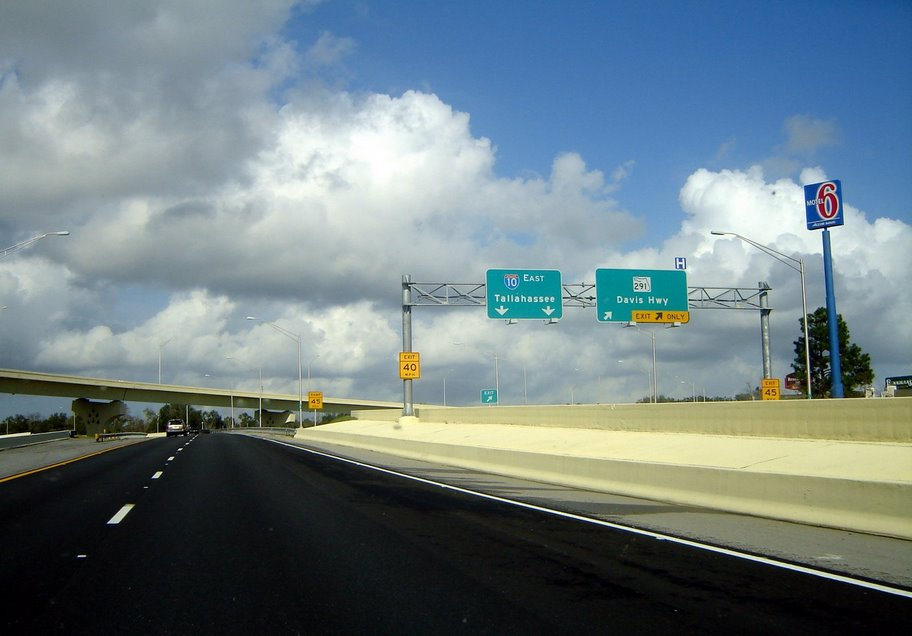
Interstate 110

- Interstate 10 in Florida
- Reuben O'Donovan Askew Parkway (Interstate 110)

=== U.S. Highways ===
- U.S. Highway 29
- U.S. Highway 90
- U.S. Highway 90 Alternate
- U.S. Highway 98
- U.S. 98 BUS

=== State Highways ===
- State Road 4
- State Road 87
- State Road 97
- State Road 196
- State Road 281
- State Road 289
- State Road 727
- State Road 290
- State Road 291
- State Road 292
- State Road 294
- State Road 295
- State Road 296
- State Road 297
- State Road 298
- State Road 399

== Codes of metropolitan Pensacola ==
=== Area codes ===
- 850, 448

=== ZIP codes ===
The following is a list of ZIP codes for selected areas within the metropolitan area.

Escambia County

- 32501 in Pensacola, downtown north of Wright Street
- 32502 in Pensacola, downtown south of Wright Street
- 32503 in Pensacola, east of Palafox Street
- 32504 in Pensacola, northeast Pensacola
- 32505 in Pensacola, inner western suburbs
- 32506 in Pensacola, western suburbs
- 32507 in Pensacola, Warrington and Perdido Key
- 32508 in Pensacola, Naval Air Station Pensacola
- 32509 in Pensacola, NOLF Saufley Field
- 32511 in Pensacola, Corry Station Naval Technical Training Center
- 32512 in Pensacola, Naval Hospital Pensacola
- 32513 in Pensacola
- 32514 in Pensacola, northern suburbs including Ferry Pass
- 32516 in Pensacola
- 32520 in Pensacola, used by Gulf Power
- 32521 in Pensacola, used by the City of Pensacola
- 32522 in Pensacola
- 32523 in Pensacola
- 32524 in Pensacola
- 32526 in Pensacola, northwestern suburbs including Bellview and Beulah
- 32533 in Cantonment
- 32534 in Ensley
- 32559 in Pensacola
- 32560 in Gonzalez
- 32568 in McDavid, Walnut Hill
- 32577 in Molino
- 32591 in Pensacola

Santa Rosa County

- 32530 in Bagdad
- 32561 in Gulf Breeze
- 32562 in Gulf Breeze
- 32563 in Gulf Breeze
- 32564 in Holt, serves parts of Santa Rosa and Okaloosa counties
- 32565 in Jay
- 32566 in Navarre
- 32570 in Milton
- 32571 in Pace
- 32572 in Milton
- 32583 in Milton

== Culture ==
Pensacola shares some aspects of European colonial culture seen in other Gulf cities like New Orleans; Galveston, TX; Biloxi, MS; and Mobile, AL. Initially settled by the Spanish, Pensacola celebrates this history with the annual Festival of the Five Flags. Pensacola also celebrates Mardi Gras each year, though, the city's festivities focus on the weekend before Mardi Gras.

Penascola blends Southern cuisine with the abundance of seafood found as a result of the coastal geographic setting. Among its popular dishes are fried mullet, shrimp and grits, fried grouper sandwiches, and grilled red snapper. Penascola is home to Joe Patti's Seafood, the largest seafood market in the United States. Penascola's proximity to fertile agricultural lands allows for seasonal harvests of peanuts, butter beans, silver corn, tomatoes, strawberries, and blue berries.

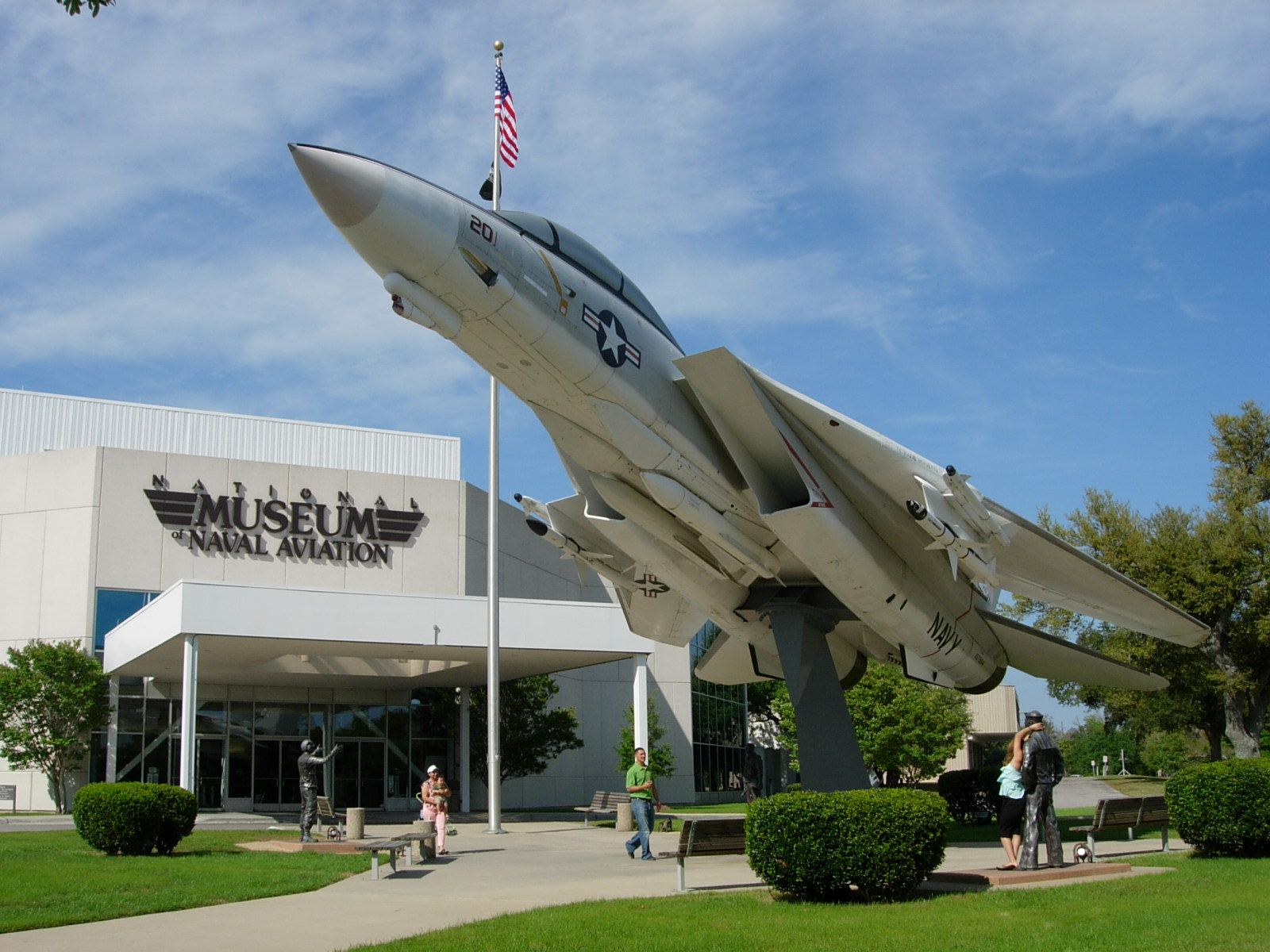
Museum of Naval Aviation

=== Performing arts ===
- Pensacola Symphony Orchestra
- Pensacola Saenger Theatre
- Pensacola Opera
- Pensacola Little Theatre
- Choral Society of Pensacola
- Ballet Pensacola
- Pensacola Children's Chorus

=== Museums ===
- National Museum of Naval Aviation
- Parts of the Gulf Islands National Seashore:
  - Fort Barrancas
  - Fort Pickens
- Pensacola Museum of Art
- Historic Pensacola's Museum of Industry
- Historic Pensacola's Museum of Commerce
- Pensacola MESS Hall
- Milton Historical Society

== Sports ==
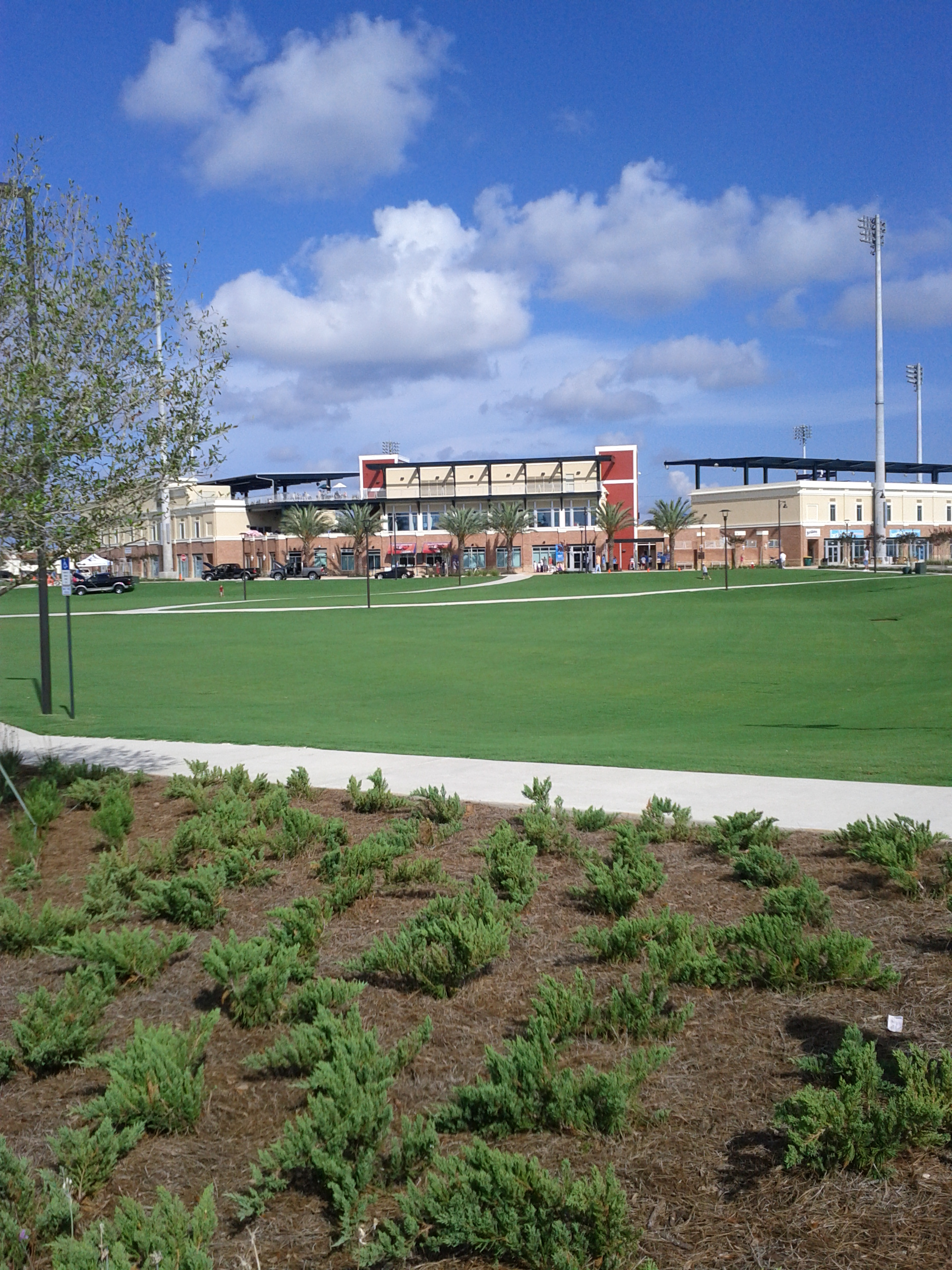
Community Maritime Park in Downtown Pensacola

- Pensacola Blue Wahoos, Double-A baseball
- Pensacola Ice Flyers, ice hockey
- Pensacola FC, Soccer
- West Florida Argos, various sports

== See also ==
- Florida statistical areas
- Pensacola
- Navarre, Florida
- Milton, Florida
