= Florida State Road 99 =

Highway in Florida

State Road 99
- SR 99 highlighted in red

Route information
- Maintained by FDOT
- Length: 2.586 mi (4.162 km)
- Existed: 1945–present

Major junctions
- South end: US 90 / CR 99 in Escambia County
- North end: CR 99 / Isaacs Lane in Escambia County

Location
- Country: United States
- State: Florida
- Counties: Escambia

Highway system
- Florida State Highway System; Interstate; US; State; Former; Pre‑1945; Toll; Scenic
← US 98	→ SR 100

State Road 99 is a 2.56-mile-long (4.12 km) north–south highway running along Beulah Road in unincorporated Escambia County, Florida. It is the westernmost north–south two-digit highway in Florida. The southern terminus is at the intersection with Mobile Highway (US 90/SR 10A) and Beulah Road (CR 99 south), while the northern terminus is at the intersection of Isaacs Lane and Beulah Road (CR 99 north). It could be extended to US 29 in the future if the current studies are approved.

== History ==
SR 99 was originally one continuous route, defined from US 90 Alt. north to Walnut Hill, then west on current SR 99A to Pineville and back north to the Alabama state line near Nokomis. It was later cut back to run only from Barrineau Park to Walnut Hill, and was subsequently extended north to Alabama, replacing State Road 380. The original alignment south of Muscogee was restored at some point, while Muscogee to Barrineau Park (with a different alignment at the Muscogee end) became a second segment of SR 97 (now CR 97), and Walnut Hill to Pineville became part of SR 99A. The road from Pineville north never received a number after SR 99 was removed from it.

In 2019, the Florida Department of Transportation and Escambia County signed a road swap agreement that would return State Road 99 to the state highway system, bringing back the portion running on Beulah Road from US 90 to Isaacs Lane, with plans to study a new corridor to extend SR 99 to US 29. In 2019, the road was restored to the SHS.

== Major intersections ==
The entire route is in Escambia County.

Location	mi	km	Destinations	Notes
	0.000	0.000	US 90 (Mobile Highway / SR 10A)	Southern terminus; Beulah Road continues south as CR 99.
	1.162	1.870	US 90 Alt. (West 9 Mile Road / SR 10)	
	2.352	3.785	Isaacs Lane	Northern terminus; Beulah Road continues north as CR 99.
1.000 mi = 1.609 km; 1.000 km = 0.621 mi

== Related routes ==
=== County Road 99 ===
Escambia County Road 99 (CR 99) consists of the road that comprised the original SR 99. CR 99 starts at a cul-de-sac in the neighborhood of Hurst Hammock near the Perdido River. The road continues north through rural neighborhoods until it intersects with Mobile Highway (US 90 / SR 10A), where it continues north as SR 99.

CR 99 picks up again north of the intersection with Isaacs Avenue, traveling over I-10 without an interchange before ending at CR 184 (Muscogee Road) in Muscogee. A second segment begins where CR 196 ends, in Barrineau Park east of the Perdido River. It heads north through Bay Springs and McKinnon to meet SR 97 in Walnut Hill, with which it has a wrong-way concurrency before turning back north, traveling through Oak Grove, crossing CR 4 in Bratt, ending at the Alabama state line. The road continues in Escambia County, Alabama as CR 8, which ends at US 31 west of Canoe, Alabama.

=== County Road 99A ===
County Road 99A (CR 99A), formerly State Road 99A, begins at CR 99 in Oak Grove and heads west, crossing SR 97 in Walnut Hill and ending in Pineville.
