= U.S. Route 29 in Florida =

Highway in Florida

U.S. Highway 29

Route information
- Maintained by FDOT
- Length: 43.7 mi (70.3 km)
- Existed: 1936–present

Major junctions
- South end: US 90 / US 98 in Pensacola
- I-10 near Ensley; US 90 Alt. in Ensley; SR 97 in Molino; SR 4 in Century
- North end: US 29 in Flomaton, AL

Location
- Country: United States
- State: Florida
- Counties: Escambia

Highway system
- United States Numbered Highway System; List; Special; Divided; Florida State Highway System; Interstate; US; State; Former; Pre‑1945; Toll; Scenic
← SR 27	→ SR 29
← I-95	SR 95	→ SR 97

U.S. Highway 29 (US 29) in the state of Florida is the westernmost north–south United States Numbered Highway in the state. It runs 43.7 miles (70.3 km) from downtown Pensacola north to the Alabama state line entirely within Escambia County. US 29 runs as a four-lane highway through much of the Florida Panhandle, becoming six lanes through and near several towns. The highway's hidden state road designation is entirely State Road 95 (SR 95).

Street names include North Palafox Street, Pensacola Boulevard, and Century Boulevard. From Brent to Cantonment, US 29 runs between two different railroad lines. On the west side is a line formerly owned by the St. Louis–San Francisco Railway (Frisco; now owned by the Alabama and Gulf Coast Railway), and, on the east side is a line previously owned by the Louisville and Nashville Railroad (L&N; now CSX Transportation).

== Route description ==
US 29 begins its northward journey at an intersection with US 90 and US 98 in downtown Pensacola along North Palafox Street, which starts off as a four-lane undivided concrete boulevard, with occasional provisions for center-left turn lanes. The road enters Goulding at County Road 480 (CR 480), and straddles the Pensacola–Goulding border until just south of the intersection with SR 752, which ends west of the next intersection, which is SR 295. The road passes by the western edge of the Escambia Wood Treating Company Superfund Site and enters Brent. The division of the highway begins at Massachusetts Avenue, which is part of the eastern terminus of SR 292, and remains that way throughout much of the county. After the intersection with SR 296, the name of US 29 changes to Pensacola Boulevard, and North Palafox Street moves onto its former routing along CR 95A, which it will maintain until it reaches Ten Mile Road. North of CR 95A, US 29 serves as the western terminus of SR 750, which leads to Pensacola International Airport, and later becomes the northern terminus of CR 453, a four-lane boulevard that serves as a shortcut to western Pensacola. After the western terminus of SR 742, US 29 encounters a massive interchange with Interstate 10 at exits 10A and 10B, which includes loop ramps, flyovers, and an unusually wide median, all of which is on the border between Brent and Ensley. A far more conventional diamond interchange with US 90 Alternate (US 90 Alt.) can be found up ahead, but not before encountering three signalized intersections, four if the emergency signal for a county firehouse is counted. Commercial surroundings begin to thin out north of US 90 Alt. but do not disappear entirely. After the intersection with Ten Mile Road, the route enters Gonzalez. Approximately one mile (1.6 km) north of there, CR 95A (now simply named "Highway 95A") runs parallel to the northbound lane connected only by turn lanes, mainly from the northbound lane itself. This trajectory ends across from CR 297, and, afterward, CR 95A moves away from US 29. CR 95A briefly returns to the side of the northbound lane near a local diner, only for US 29 to curve away from it to the northwest between Tate School Road and CR 749.

Before entering Cantonment, CR 95A merges with US 29 just south of the grounds of a large International Paper factory across the street from that intersection, where the road becomes a four-lane undivided highway. The railroad line that serves that plant, connecting the former Frisco line to the old L&N line, encounters the road in a grade crossing just south of the intersection with Muscogee Road (CR 184) and Beck's Lake Road, where CR 184 secretly joins the route. Shortly after this intersection, CR 95A separates from US 29 once again just after the divider is revived. After the intersection with Neal Road, US 29 gains the supplemental name "Don Sutton Highway" and then runs under a powerline right-of-way. From there, the route continues northwest as it passes by the Central Commerce Park just before entering Molino curving back toward the north. CR 184 branches off to the east onto West Quintette Road, then US 29 crosses over the Jack's Branch River, and later flies through the intersection with CR 196. North of there, the road descends slightly over a culvert over a tributary of Cowdevil Creek but then elevates through a wooded area which ends at some farmland at the top of this ascension. The road passes by an Escambia County sheriff's station on the northeast corner of Omega Avenue and later dips again as it approaches the culvert over the Dry Creek just south of a blinker-light intersection with CR 182. Just north of here, the road inherits the name "Century Boulevard" and runs parallel to the same powerline right-of-way it crossed under at Neal Road in Cantonment. It passes a power substation across the street from local businesses, but more forestland can be found on the east side while more farmland can be found on the west side, with the brief exception of church across from the intersection with Bet Raines Road. From there, the forest on the east side evolves into farmland until it approaches SR 97 which spans southeast to CR 95A and northwest to Atmore, Alabama. The powerlines move to the northeast, and, less than 0.5 miles (0.80 km) from there, US 29 encounters the northern terminus of CR 95A right after a second crossing of the Jack's Branch River.

From here, the road begins to curve more toward the northeast. Just north of the Morgan Cemetery, US 29 enters Barth, which contains a side road toward the Lakeside at Barth campground. After a pair of bridges over the Morgan Branch, the road passes a local cemetery before intersecting with Mason Road and Cotton Lake Road, the former of which serves as the entrance to a Christian summer camp called "Camp O' the Pines". Crossing a pair of bridges over Mitchell Creek, it passes a side road to the West Fraser Timber "McDavid Sawmill" and later runs under the same powerlines it encountered north of Neal Road in Cantonment. Northeast of those powerlines, the road enters Bogia, where it intersects two local streets named for the community and a pair of bridges over Cotton Creek. US 29 officially enters McDavid, where it intersects the western terminus of Main Street, where a church and the McDavid Post Office can be found and shortly afterward the eastern terminus of CR 164, 0.1 miles (0.16 km) north of a dirt road named Driver Road, which only intersects the southbound lanes. After passing by a volunteer firehouse on the east side and a gas station on the west side, the road runs over a pair of bridges over Mitchell Creek then climbs another hill, where the road runs through more forestland with sparse houses and farms.

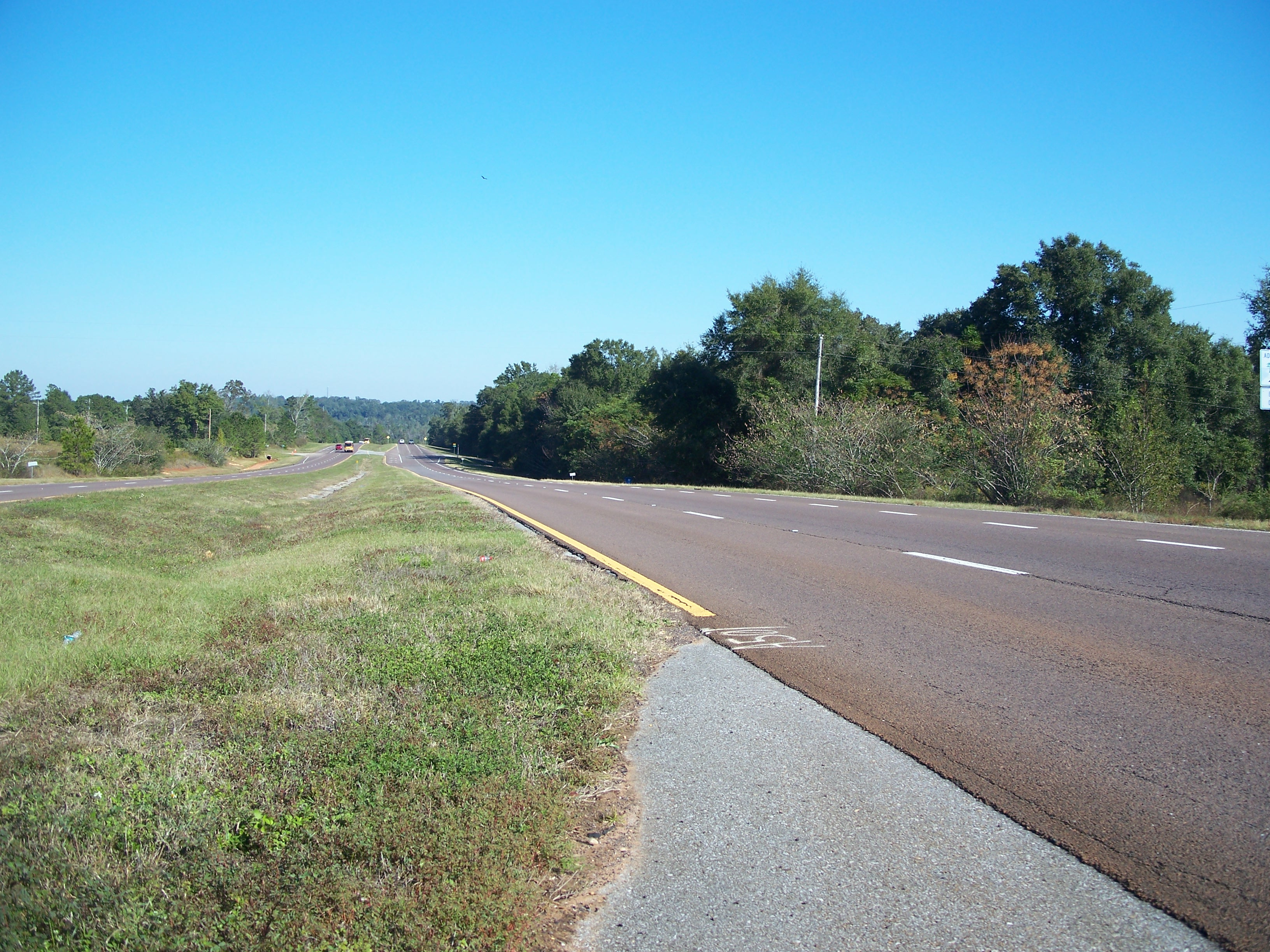
Northbound US 29 as seen from the median of Brown Road south of Bluff Springs

After the intersection with Brown Road, US 29 begins to run down a hill and later curves to the right where it crosses over a pair of bridges over Canoe Creek, then enters Bluff Springs, which appears to be more residential than communities further to the south, but is not lacking in woodlands or farmlands either. Century Boulevard makes a sharper right curve after the intersection with North Canoe Road and remains as such despite briefly curving between Thompson Road and Bluff Springs Road. Afterward, it crosses a pair of bridges over the Pritchell Mill Branch. At the intersection of Dawson Road, some reduce speed warning sings can be spotted for the northbound lanes, showing a sign of the end of rural high-speed travel. This occurrence is because the divider that has run along the middle of the road since Brent is replaced by a continuous left-turn lane at the intersection of Tedder Road near a branch of the Century Fire Department just before the road crosses a bridge over Wiggins Branch, where it enters Century.

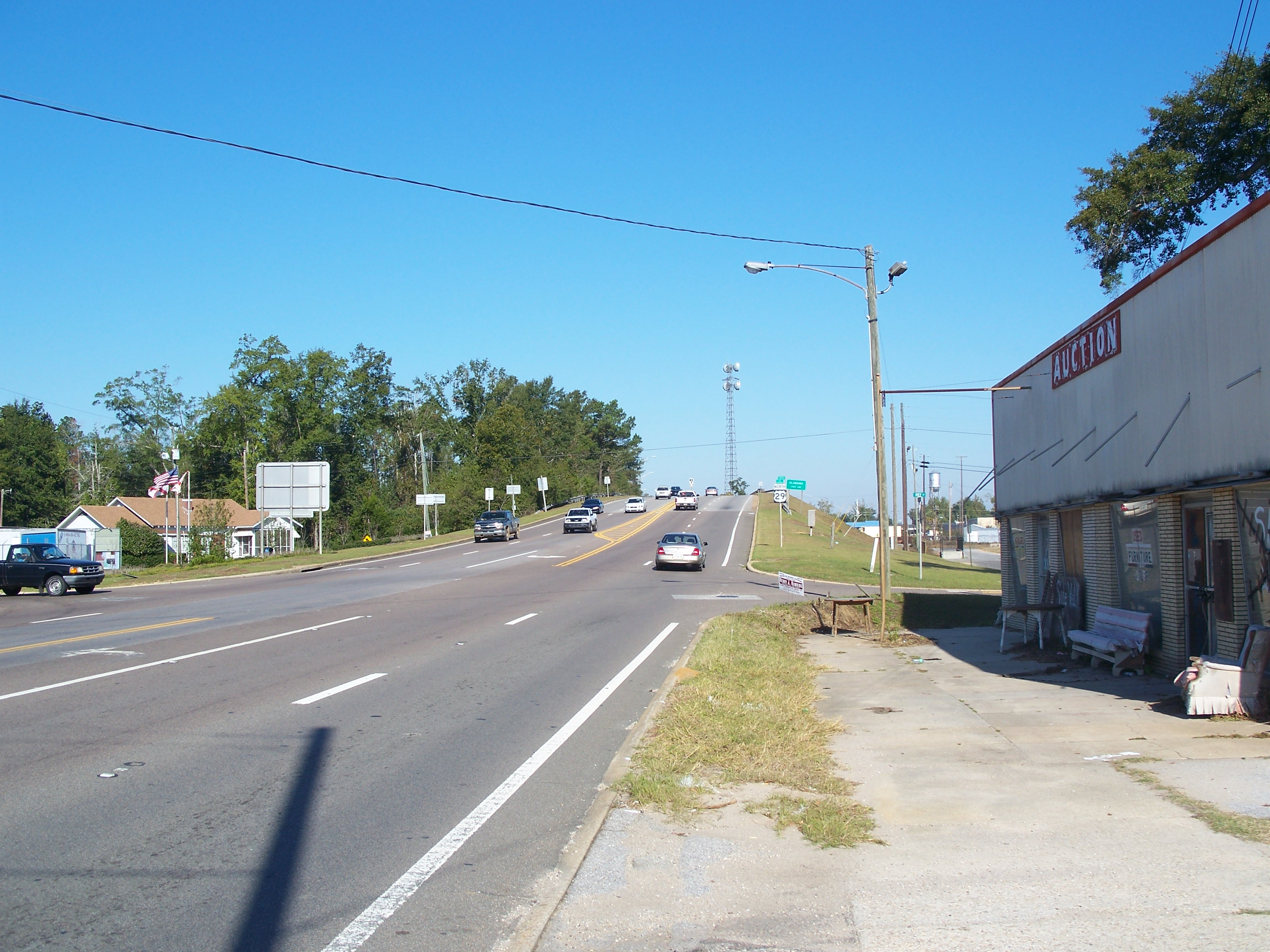
US 29 just before crossing the Florida–Alabama state line

Despite entering the town limits, the surroundings remain rural and residential. At the intersection of CR 4, the route secretly gains a hidden concurrency with SR 4. The road dips down over a bridge over Mill Creek before the eastern terminus of CR 4A, with a southeast continuation onto Front Street, and then approaches the intersection of West and East Hecker Road. Signs approaching East Hecker Road point to the Alger–Sullivan Lumber Company Residential Historic District. SR 4 breaks away from US 29 to head east toward Jay, Baker, and Milligan, while US 29 begins to curve into a more northwesterly direction. The road curves further to the northwest at the intersection with East McCurdy Street and further to the northwest just before the intersection with Jackson Street. The last intersections with US 29 in Florida are Renfro Street to the east and Glenn Street to the west (both dead end streets) before the road finally intersects the Florida–Alabama state line at State Line Road, then climbs a bridge over a large railroad yard to enter downtown Flomaton, Alabama.

== History ==
Historical US 92 route markers

1927 design

1948 design

1956–1993, red highway shields

Part of the route of US 29 follows a trail that Andrew Jackson used in 1818 in the spring during the First Seminole War, when he was on his way from Pensacola to Fort Montgomery.

US 29 originally ran concurrently with the former alignment of US 331 between 1926 and 1936.

Beginning in 1956, signs for U.S. Highways in Florida had different colors for each highway. The shield for US 29 was red with white lettering and outline, until the state was forced by the federal government to conform to standards that required consistent black-and-white signs in 1993.

== Major intersections ==
The entire route is in Escambia County.

Location	mi	km	Destinations	Notes
Pensacola	0.0	0.0	US 90 / US 98 (Cervantes Street / SR 10A)	Southern terminus of US 29; southern terminus of SR 95
Pensacola	1.8	2.9	SR 752 (Texar Drive)	
Pensacola	2.0	3.2	SR 295 (West Fairfield Drive) to I-110	I-110 exit 4
Brent	3.0	4.8	SR 292 south (Pace Boulevard)	
Brent	3.6	5.8	SR 296 (Beverly Parkway / Brent Lane) – Airport	
Brent	3.7	6.0	CR 95A north	northbound access only
Brent	4.2	6.8	SR 750 east (Airport Boulevard)	
Brent	5.2	8.4	CR 453 south (W Street)	
Brent	5.9	9.5	SR 742 east (West Burgess Road)	
Brent–Ensley line	6.6	10.6	I-10 (SR 8) – Pensacola Beach, Tallahassee, Mobile	I-10 exit 10
Ensley	8.4	13.5	US 90 Alt. (SR 10) – Mobile, Tallahassee, truck route to NAS Pensacola	interchange
Gonzalez	10.6	17.1	CR 95A	
Gonzalez	10.7	17.2	CR 297 south (West Roberts Road)	
Gonzalez	11.3	18.2	CR 186 (East Kingsfield Road)	
Gonzalez	12.0	19.3	Old Chemstrand Road (CR 749 east)	
Gonzalez	14.1	22.7	CR 95A south	South end of CR 95A overlap
Cantonment	14.7	23.7	CR 184 west (Muscogee Road / Beck's Lake Road)	South end of CR 184 overlap
Cantonment	14.9	24.0	CR 95A north	North end of CR 95A overlap
Cantonment	18.0	29.0	CR 184 east (West Quintette Road)	North end of CR 184 overlap
Molino	20.0	32.2	CR 196	
Molino	22.5	36.2	CR 182 (Molino Road) – Barrineau Park, Molino	
Molino	23.5	37.8	SR 97 – Atmore, Molino	
Molino	24.1	38.8	CR 95A south	
McDavid	33.3	53.6	CR 164 west	
Century	41.5	66.8	CR 4 west – Lake Stone Campground	South end of CR 4 overlap
Century	41.7	67.1	CR 4A west	
Century	42.5	68.4	SR 4 east – Jay	North end of SR 4 overlap
Century	43.7	70.3	US 29 north (SR 113) – Flomaton	Continuation into Alabama; northern terminus of SR 95
1.000 mi = 1.609 km; 1.000 km = 0.621 mi: Concurrency terminus

U.S. Route 29
Previous state: Terminus	Florida	Next state: Alabama
