= Florida State Road 297 =

Highway in Florida, USA

State Road 297
- Pine Forest Road
- SR 297 in red, CR 297 in blue

Route information
- Maintained by FDOT
- Length: 4.294 mi (6.911 km)

Major junctions
- South end: US 90 in Bellview
- I-10 near Ensley
- North end: US 90 Alt. / CR 297 in Ensley

Location
- Country: United States
- State: Florida
- Counties: Escambia

Highway system
- Florida State Highway System; Interstate; US; State; Former; Pre‑1945; Toll; Scenic
← SR 296	→ SR 298

State Road 297 (SR 297) is a north–south divided highway northwest of Pensacola known locally as Pine Forest Road. The road serves as a connector between Mobile Highway (US 90/SR 10) and Interstate 10 (SR 8) in the Pensacola metropolitan area. The road also extends into the northern Pensacola suburbs, where it ends at an intersection with Nine Mile Road (Alt US 90/SR 10). The road is also the main truck route to Pensacola Naval Air Station.

== Major intersections ==
The entire route is in Escambia County.

Location	mi	km	Destinations	Notes
Bellview	0.000	0.000	US 90 (Mobile Highway / SR 10A) – Gulf Islands National Seashore, NAS Pensacola, Naval Aviation Museum	
Bellview	0.921	1.482	SR 173 south (Blue Angel Parkway) – Perdido Key, Big Lagoon State Park, NAS Pensacola, National Museum of Naval Aviation, Saufley Field	
	3.41	5.49	I-10 (SR 8) – Mobile, Tallahassee	I-10 exit 7; signed as exits 7A (SR 297 southbound) and 7B (SR 297 northbound) eastbound
Ensley	4.294	6.911	US 90 Alt. (Nine Mile Road / SR 10) / CR 297 north (Pine Forest Road)	
1.000 mi = 1.609 km; 1.000 km = 0.621 mi
