= McDavid, Florida =

Unincorporated community in Florida, U.S.

McDavid is an unincorporated community in Escambia County, Florida, United States. The community is part of the Pensacola – Ferry Pass – Brent, Florida Metropolitan Statistical Area. The ZIP Code for McDavid is 32568.

== History ==
The community was named after Joel McDavid, one of its founding residents, in 1883. Before that, it was known as Regia.

== Geography ==
McDavid is located at 30.866297°N 87.319698°W. The town lies directly south of Century, Florida and north of Molino, Florida. The main roads within the town are U.S. Route 29 and County Road 164.

The town has a post office that serves the north end of the county.

== Education ==
The town's children attend schools within the Escambia County School District including Bratt Elementary School, Byrneville Elementary School, Ernest Ward Middle School, and Northview High School.
