= Florida State Road 296 =

State highway in Florida, United States

State Road 296
- SR 296 in red, CR 296 in blue

Route information
- Maintained by FDOT
- Length: 9.601 mi (15.451 km)

Major junctions
- West end: US 90 / CR 296 in Bellview
- US 29 in Brent; I-110 in Brent
- East end: US 90 in Pensacola

Location
- Country: United States
- State: Florida
- Counties: Escambia

Highway system
- Florida State Highway System; Interstate; US; State; Former; Pre‑1945; Toll; Scenic
| ← SR 295 | → SR 297 |

State Road 296 (SR 296) is a major thoroughfare in the Pensacola, Florida metropolitan area. It is an east–west route running roughly through midtown Pensacola and West Pensacola. Locally, it is known as Michigan Avenue, Beverly Parkway, Brent Lane, Bayou Boulevard, and Perry Avenue. The western terminus of SR 296 is at U.S. Route 90 (US 90; Mobile Highway). Westward of this intersection, County Road 296 (Saufley Field Road) connects to State Road 173. The eastern terminus of State Road 296 is again at US 90, this time in eastern Pensacola, where it is known as Cervantes Street.

== Route description ==
State Road 296 begins at an intersection with U.S. Route 90 (Mobile Highway (State Road 10A)) in Bellview, Florida, as a continuation of County Road 296 (Saufley Field Road), which runs from State Road 173 to the Mobile Highway intersection. State Road 296 heads eastward from U.S. Route 90 as West Michigan Avenue through a four-lane commercial neighborhood. This continues for a couple miles before entering a residential neighborhood just east of Esperanto Road. Passing near Crescent Lake, State Road 296 turns to the northeast and soon to the east before Pipeline Road, where the road turns to the southeast and changes names to Beverly Parkway. After the name change, the road crosses a freight railroad crossing and enters Brent, where it intersects with County Road 453 (NW Street). The highway expands to four lanes and becomes commercial, entering an intersection with U.S. Route 29 (State Road 85, Old Palafox Highway).

At that intersection, State Road 296 changes names to Brent Lane and soon crosses over freight tracks on a viaduct. Just after the viaduct, the highway passes the Pensacola Christian College and enters a modified diamond interchange with Interstate 110 (I-110; State Road 8A). From there, State Road 296 intersects with State Road 291 (North Davis Highway) in Pensacola and turns to the northeast as Brent Lane. At the intersection with Springhill Drive, State Road 296 turns southeastward and changes names to Bayou Boulevard. The road passes to the south of Sacred Heart Hospital and intersects with State Road 289. Entering the Cordova Park neighborhood, State Road 296 becomes primarily residential for several miles, until DuPort Road, where it turns southeastward along Bayou Texar. The roads turns south once more along the bayou before the intersection with Hyde Park Road, where State Road 296 turns eastward along Hyde Park Road, coming to an intersection with U.S. Route 90 (Scenic Highway) in Pensacola. This intersection is the eastern terminus of State Road 296.

== History ==
The part of SR 296 east of North 12th Avenue was known as State Road 289B until the mid-1970s. Beverly Parkway assumes control of SR 296, diverging from Michigan Avenue as the state road bends southward, just beyond the Burlington Northern Railroad tracks, extending to U.S. 29 (Palafox Street). Within the bustling hub of Brent, where traffic congestion is a common sight, SR 296 undergoes another name change, transitioning to Brent Lane upon crossing Palafox Street.

== Major intersections ==
The entire route is in Escambia County.

| Location | mi | km | Destinations | Notes |
|---|---|---|---|---|
| Bellview | 0.000 | 0.000 | US 90 (Mobile Highway / SR 10A) / CR 296 (Saufley Field Road) | |
| Brent | 2.911 | 4.685 | CR 453 (W Street) | |
| Brent | 3.569 | 5.744 | US 29 (North Palafox Street / SR 95) | |
| Brent | 4.49 | 7.23 | I-110 (SR 8A) to I-10 – Pensacola Beach | I-110 exit 5 |
| Brent | 4.686 | 7.541 | SR 291 (Davis Highway) | |
| Pensacola | 5.516 | 8.877 | SR 289 (North 9th Avenue) – Pensacola Junior College | |
| Pensacola | 9.601 | 15.451 | US 90 (East Cervantes Street / SR 10A) | |
1.000 mi = 1.609 km; 1.000 km = 0.621 mi
