= Florida State Road 173 =

State highway in Florida, United States

State Road 173
- Blue Angel Parkway
- SR 173 highlighted in red

Route information
- Maintained by FDOT
- Length: 11.933 mi (19.204 km)

Major junctions
- South end: CR 292A at NAS Pensacola
- US 98 near Millview; US 90 in Bellview
- North end: SR 297 near Bellview

Location
- Country: United States
- State: Florida
- Counties: Escambia

Highway system
- Florida State Highway System; Interstate; US; State; Former; Pre‑1945; Toll; Scenic
← SR 166	→ I-175

State Road 173 (SR 173), locally known as Blue Angel Parkway, is a major thoroughfare in the Pensacola, Florida metropolitan area. SR 173 has its southern terminus at the western entrance to NAS Pensacola, and runs south–north through West Pensacola to its northern terminus at State Road 297 (Pine Forest Road).

== Route Description ==
SR 173, which is also known as Blue Angel Parkway for its entire length, curves away from its southern terminus at the western entrance to NAS Pensacola and runs northwest through the community of Sherman Grove, before crossing SR 292 and curving to head northeast through West Pensacola. Just south of crossing US 98/SR 30, the road turns directly north, crosses US 98/SR 30, and then curves northeast to north again through the community of Millview, intersecting with SR 298, and heading into Bellview. Just before reaching US 90/SR 10A, the road turns sharply east, crosses US 90/SR 10A, and terminates at its intersection with SR 297.

The Florida Department of Transportation annual average daily traffic (AADT) numbers for 2012 show average numbers starting at 10,000 vehicles on the southern portion of the road, increasing to between 17,000 and 22,000 vehicles around SR 298, and again decreasing to 16,000 as the road approaches Bellview, hitting 14,000 vehicles per day at the road's northern terminus.

== History ==
In 1955, a portion of today's routing of SR 173, from today's US 98/SR 30 to the sharp turn to the east close to today's northern terminus, is being shown as a bituminous road, and is signed as SR 297. SR 297 at the time included what is today signed as CR 297, as well as the part of today's SR 298 from CR 297 and SR 173, which runs alongside Perdido Bay. There are indications of ongoing construction to the south of US 98/SR 30, but very little roadway in that direction had been completed at the time.

On maps from 1978, the routing of SR 173 from its southern terminus to its intersection with CR 296, which is the extension of SR 296 west of US 90/SR 10A, is showing as having been completed with hard surface. North of CR 296 in Bellview, the roadway was not signed as either a state nor county road for two blocks, until CR 297 picks up and carries the road to US 90/SR 10A.

By 1994, today's routing of SR 173, including the portion north of CR 296, which crosses US 90/SR 10A, and terminates at SR 297, is shown as having been completed.

== Major intersections ==
The entire route is in Escambia County.

Location	mi	km	Destinations	Notes
	0.000	0.000	CR 292A (Gulf Beach Highway)	south end of state maintenance
	1.619	2.606	SR 292 (Sorrento Road) – Perdido Key	
	3.181	5.119	CR 297 (Dog Track Road)	
	4.851	7.807	US 98 (SR 30)	
Sand Cut	6.415	10.324	SR 298 (Lillian Highway)	
Bellview	8.385	13.494	Cerny Road (CR 296A east)	
Bellview	9.287	14.946	CR 296 (Saufley Field Road) – Saufley Field, Airport	
Bellview	11.343	18.255	US 90 (Mobile Highway / SR 10A)	
Bellview	11.933	19.204	SR 297 (Pine Forest Road) to I-10	Northern terminus
1.000 mi = 1.609 km; 1.000 km = 0.621 mi
