= Florida State Road 97 =

Highway in Florida

State Road 97
- SR 97 highlighted in red

Route information
- Maintained by FDOT
- Length: 22.507 mi (36.222 km)

Major junctions
- South end: CR 95A in Molino
- US 29 in Molino; CR 99A in Walnut Hill
- North end: SR 21 in Atmore, AL

Location
- Country: United States
- State: Florida
- Counties: Escambia

Highway system
- Florida State Highway System; Interstate; US; State; Former; Pre‑1945; Toll; Scenic
← SR 95	→ US 98

State Road 97 (SR 97) is a south-north two-lane highway entirely in Escambia County, Florida. It runs from County Road 95A, just southeast of U.S. Highway 29 in Molino, to the Alabama state line near Atmore, where it becomes State Route 21. The road runs through the community of Walnut Hill and serves primarily to connect Pensacola to the northwest Escambia County and Atmore areas. In combination with SR 21, the road also provides a connection to Interstate 65.

== Route description ==
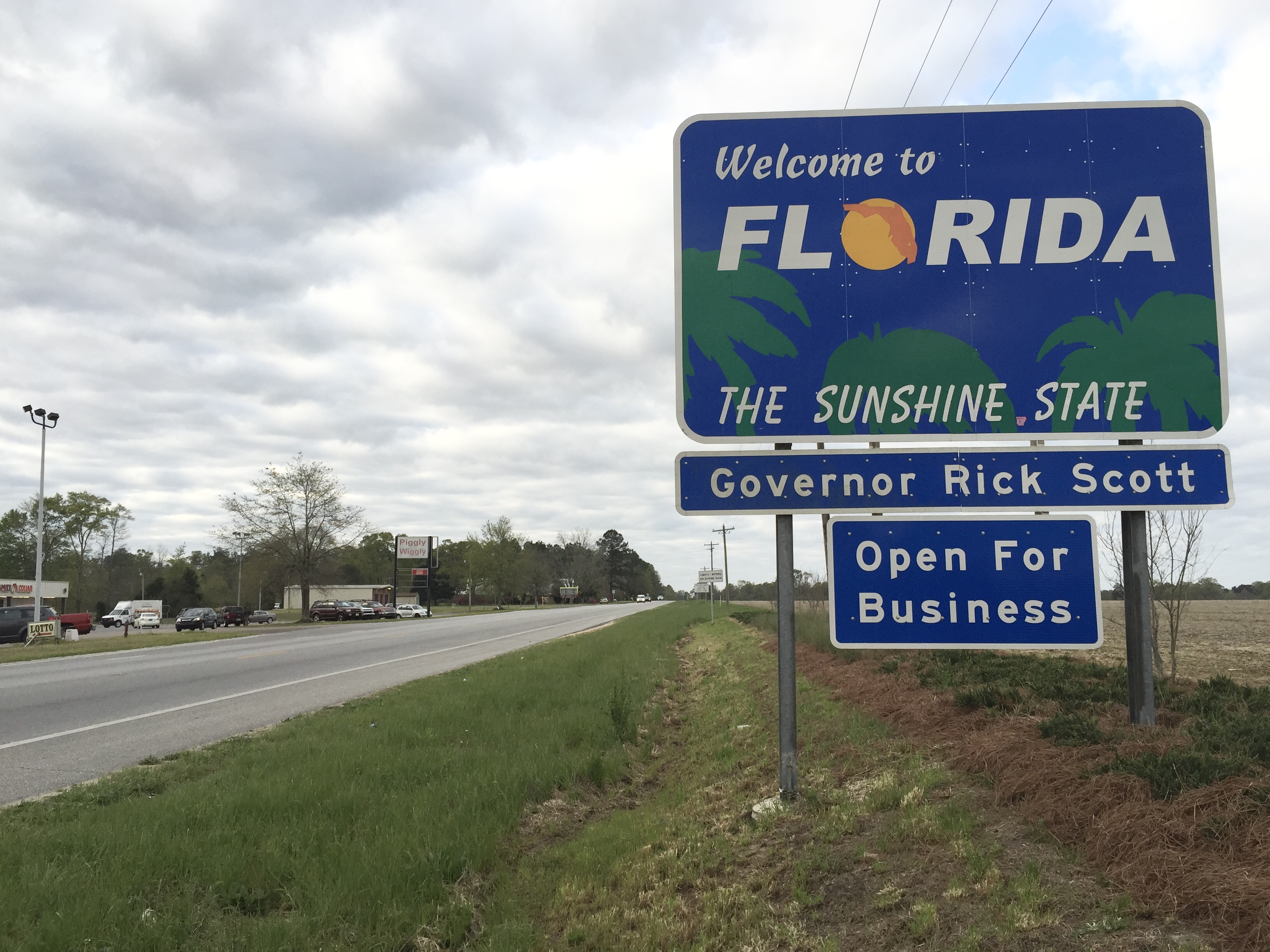
View south from the north end of SR 97, March 2016

SR 97 heads northwest from its southern terminus at County Road 95A, just east of passing under U.S. Highway 29/SR 95, in Molino. The road heads northwest through rural Escambia County and slowly turns into a northerly direction as it approaches Walnut Hill, north of which it is also known as Atmore Highway. Heading directly north from Walnut Hill, the road meets its northern terminus south of Atmore at the Alabama state line, where it becomes State Route 21. SR 97 intersects with several county roads, but does not meet with other state roads or US highways.

The Florida Department of Transportation annual average daily traffic (AADT) numbers for 2012 show average numbers between 5,600 vehicles on the southern portion of the road, decreasing to 4,300 vehicles around Walnut Hill, and again increasing to 5,000 north of Walnut Hill, back to 5,600 vehicles at the road's northern terminus.

== History ==
A 1922 map of Florida auto trails shows an unimproved auto trail running from Quintette, south of Molino, through what appears to be the Walnut Hill area, and then to Atmore. It appears that the portion of today's SR 97 from Walnut Hill (starting around mile 15) to its northern terminus corresponds to this 1922 auto trail. The southern portion also appears on this map, but is indicated as an unimportant road.

In 1935, the current routing of SR 97, from Molino northwest to Walnut Hill, then north to Atmore, was extant as a third-class graded road, and was signed as SR 87 at the time.

By 1955, SR 4 is being shown as a bituminous road, with its start at the intersection with US 29/SR 95 (now CR 95A) west of Molino, and traveling its current routing to Atmore. The road intersected what were then SR 99 and SR 380 (now both CR 99) around Walnut Hill, and SR 4 (now CR 4) south of the Alabama state line.

On maps from 1978, the entire road had been paved in hard surface. The state roads it had intersected in 1955 had all been re-signed as county roads, bringing SR 97 to its current form.

== Major intersections ==
The entire route is in Escambia County.

Location	mi	km	Destinations	Notes
Molino	0.000	0.000	CR 95A	
Molino	0.610	0.982	US 29 (SR 95) – Cantonment, Century	south end of state maintenance
Walnut Hill	13.509	21.741	CR 99 north	
Walnut Hill	14.246	22.927	CR 99 south	
Walnut Hill	15.134	24.356	CR 99A (Arthur Brown Road)	
	17.143	27.589	CR 164 east	
	20.050	32.267	CR 4 east – Century	
	22.507	36.222	SR 21 north – Atmore	Continuation beyond Alabama state line
1.000 mi = 1.609 km; 1.000 km = 0.621 mi: Concurrency terminus

== See also ==
- List of state highways in Florida
