= Special routes of U.S. Route 90 =

Special routes of U.S. Route 90

Highway system
- United States Numbered Highway System; List; Special; Divided

A total of 10 special routes of U.S. Route 90 exist.

== Texas ==
All of the alternate and business routes within Texas are maintained by the Texas Department of Transportation (TxDOT). U.S. Route 90 has one alternate route and two business routes within the state. Along US 90, TxDOT identifies each business route as Business U.S. Highway followed by an alphabetic suffix. Along Texas U.S. routes, the alphabetic suffixes on business route names ascend eastward and northward. There are gaps in the alphabetic values to allow for future system expansion or for decommissioned routes. The alphabetic naming suffixes are included as small letters on the bottom of route shields.

=== Seguin–Houston alternate ===
Alternate U.S. Highway 90
- Location: Seguin–Houston, Texas
- Length: 175.290 mi (282.102 km)
- Existed: 1942–present

U.S. Highway 90 Alternate is an alternate route to U.S. Highway 90 in Texas, running from west of Seguin east via Seguin, Gonzales, Hallettsville, Eagle Lake, Rosenberg and Sugar Land to northeastern Houston. South of Downtown Houston, US 90 Alternate is built to freeway and near-freeway standards along a section of South Main Street.

=== Houston–Crosby business loop ===
Business U.S. Highway 90-U
- Location: Houston–Crosby, Texas
- Length: 14.1 mi (22.7 km)
- Existed: 1992–present

Business U.S Highway 90-U or Bus. US 90-U is a business route from Interstate 610 (I-610) in Houston northeastward to Farm to Market Road 2100 (FM 2100) in Crosby Texas along portions of McCarty St. and the Beaumont Highway in northeastern Harris County.

The business route was created in 1992 when US 90 was realigned off the route between Beltway 8 and FM 2100. The portion of the business route between I-610 and Beltway 8 remained concurrent with US 90 until the completion of the current US 90 along the Crosby Freeway in January 2011.

Major intersections

The entire route is in Harris County.

Location	mi	km	Destinations	Notes
Houston	0.0	0.0	I-610 / US 90 west (McCarty St.) – Sealy	I-610 south exit 24, north exit 24A; western terminus.
Beaumont Place	4.5	7.2	FM 526 (C.E. King Pkwy.) – Houston	
Beaumont Place	6.1	9.8	Beltway 8 (Sam Houston Tollway)	
Crosby	14.1	22.7	US 90 east (Beaumont Hwy.) / FM 2100 (Crosby-Lynchburg Rd.) – Liberty, Crosby	Eastern terminus
1.000 mi = 1.609 km; 1.000 km = 0.621 mi

=== Orange business loop ===
Business U.S. Highway 90-Y
- Location: Orange, Texas
- Length: 6.119 mi (9.848 km)
- Existed: 1991–present

Business U.S. Highway 90-Y or Bus. US 90-Y begins at Exit 874A of the combined route of Interstate 10 and US 90 on the west side of Orange, Texas. The route proceeds to the east along W. Park Ave. to FM 3247 where the route turns to the southeast along Strickland Dr. through western Pinehurst. After reentering Orange, the route is joined by SH 87, and the combined route proceeds to the east along MacArthur Dr. After SH 87 turns off of the route, Bus. US 90-Y continues east along Green Ave past FM 1006 and then turns north along Simmons Dr. returning to I-10 and US 90 at Exit 878.

The business route follows the former alignment of US 90 through Orange until April 30, 1962. With the realignment, the route was designated State Highway Loop 358 but was signed as a US 90 business route. That designation was canceled and replaced with the current designation on June 21, 1990.

Major intersections

The entire route is in Orange County.

Location	mi	km	Destinations	Notes
Orange	0.0	0.0	I-10 / US 90 – Beaumont	I-10 east exit 874A; western terminus.
Orange	1.6	2.6	FM 3247 (Martin Luther King Jr. Dr.)	
Orange	3.1	5.0	SH 87 south (Edgar Brown Dr.) – Port Arthur	Begin overlay of SH 87
Orange	4.1	6.6	SH 87 north (16th St.) – Deweyville	End overlay of SH 87
Orange	4.7	7.6	FM 1006 (8th St.)	
Orange	7.1	11.4	I-10 / US 90	I-10 exit 878; eastern terminus.
1.000 mi = 1.609 km; 1.000 km = 0.621 mi

== Louisiana ==
=== Lake Charles business route ===
U.S. Highway 90 Business
- Location: Lake Charles, Louisiana
- Existed: 1980s–present

=== Lafayette business route ===
U.S. Highway 90 Business
- Location: Lafayette, Louisiana
- Existed: 1965–present

=== Morgan City business route ===
U.S. Highway 90 Business
- Location: Morgan City, Louisiana
- Existed: 1999–present

U.S. Highway 90 Business is a business route of U.S. Highway 90 that goes from Louisiana Highway 182 at Morgan City to Louisiana Highway 662 at Amelia, Louisiana.

=== New Orleans business route ===
U.S. Highway 90 Business
- Location: New Orleans, Louisiana
- Existed: 1960–present

U.S. Highway 90 Business (officially U.S. Highway 90-Z) is a business route of U.S. Highway 90 in and near New Orleans, Louisiana, United States. Unlike a standard business route, it is built to higher standards than the segment of U.S. 90 that it parallels, with over half built to freeway standards and designated (but not signed as) Interstate 910. It crosses the Mississippi River on the Crescent City Connection and runs along the Westbank Expressway west of the bridge and part of the Pontchartrain Expressway in the New Orleans Central Business District. On the other hand, U.S. 90 runs along surface streets through New Orleans, crossing the Mississippi on the older and narrower Huey P. Long Bridge.

== Florida ==
=== Pensacola alternate ===
U.S. Highway 90 Alternate
- Location: Pensacola, Florida
- Existed: 1946–present

U.S. Highway 90 Alternate is an east–west bypass route of Pensacola, Florida. It is also known as Nine Mile Road, as it is located exactly nine miles north of downtown Pensacola. The route was designated and completed in the 1940s.

Interstate 10 has largely supplanted the role of U.S. 90 Alternate as a bypass route. The road today serves largely as a commercial corridor for the northern suburbs of Pensacola. However, following the partial destruction of the Escambia Bay Bridge by Hurricane Ivan in September 2004, U.S. 90 Alternate resumed its role as a cross-county route for a couple of months until the bridge reopened.

Major intersections

The entire route is in Escambia County.

Location	mi	km	Destinations	Notes
Beulah	0.000	0.000	US 90 west (Mobile Highway / SR 10A) – Mobile	
	1.797	2.892	SR 99 (Beulah Road)	
	4.540	7.306	I-10 (SR 8) – Mobile, Tallahassee	I-10 exit 5
Ensley	5.814	9.357	SR 297 south / CR 297 north (Pine Forest Road)	
Ensley	7.970	12.826	US 29 (SR 95) – Cantonment, Century	interchange
Ensley	8.164	13.139	CR 95A (North Palafox Street)	
Ensley	8.838	14.223	Chemstrand Road (CR 749 north)	
Ferry Pass	11.711	18.847	Copter Road — National Guard Armory	
Ferry Pass	12.270	19.747	SR 291 south – Pensacola, Airport	interchange
Riverview	13.024	20.960	US 90 (Scenic Highway / Davis Highway / SR 10 east / SR 10A west)	
1.000 mi = 1.609 km; 1.000 km = 0.621 mi

=== Jacksonville alternate ===
U.S. Highway 90 Alternate
- Location: Jacksonville, Florida
- Existed: 1954–present

U.S. Highway 90 Alternate is an alternate route of U.S. Highway 90 in Jacksonville, Florida. It runs from the split of Beach Boulevard and Atlantic Boulevard east along Atlantic Boulevard (State Road 10; US 90 and SR 212 use Beach Boulevard) to Southside Boulevard (State Road 115), where it turns south to end at Beach Boulevard (US 90/SR 212).

Major intersections

The entire route is in Jacksonville, Duval County.

mi	km	Destinations	Notes
0.0	0.0	US 1 / US 90 / SR 10 – Key West, Jacksonville Beach	Western terminus
		US 1 / US 23 north / US 17	
		US 1 Alt. / SR 115 (Martin Luther King Jr. Parkway) – Callahan	SR 115 joins US Alt 90. State Street becomes Arlington Expressway
		Mathews Bridge over St. Johns River	
		SR 109 – Jacksonville University	
		SR 113 north to I-295	
		SR 10A east to SR 10 – Atlantic Beach	Eastbound exit, Westbound entrance
		SR 10	Freeway segment ends
8.3	13.4	US 90 / SR 212	SR 115 continues south.
1.000 mi = 1.609 km; 1.000 km = 0.621 mi: Concurrency terminus; Incomplete access

== Former routes ==
=== Beaumont business route ===
Business U.S. Highway 90
- Location: Beaumont, Texas
- Existed: 1957–1980s

=== Houston business route ===
Business U.S. Highway 90
- Location: Houston, Texas
- Existed: 1940s–1940s

=== Houston bypass route ===
Bypass U.S. Highway 90
- Location: Houston, Texas
- Existed: 1940–1941

=== Mobile alternate ===
U.S. Route 90 Alternate
- Location: Mobile, Alabama
- Existed: 1940s–1990s

=== Mobile truck route ===
U.S. Route 90 Truck
- Location: Mobile, Alabama

=== Tallahassee alternate ===
U.S. Highway 90 Alternate
- Location: Tallahassee, Florida
- Existed: 1950

U.S. Route 90 Alternate in Tallahassee was a former segment of US 90 from 1926–1949 that existed only in 1950 as an alternate route. It ran from Tallahassee to Quincy along what is today US 27 (Hidden State Road 63) and State Road 12. The route was co-signed with US 27 from Tallahassee to Havana.

== See also ==
- List of special routes of the United States Numbered Highway System
