= Gale Ann Gordon =

American experimental psychologist and naval aviator

Gale Ann Gordon, MSC, USNR (born 1942) is an American experimental psychologist and naval aviator. In 1966 she became the first female Navy pilot to solo in a Navy training plane.

== Life ==
Gale Ann Gordon was born in Ohio in 1942. Gordon gained a masters in experimental psychology from Michigan State University in 1965, and was assigned to Pensacola Naval Air Station as a member of the Medical Service Corps. Training to become an aviation experimental psychologist, she was commissioned as a member of the flight surgeon class at Pensacola in September 1965, the only woman in a squadron of 999 men. On March 25, 1966, she flew solo in a Beechcraft T-34 Mentor at Saufley Field. This made her the first woman in the history of the Naval Air Training Command to solo a Navy training plane.
