= Century Correctional Institution =

Male state prison in Escambia County, Florida

Coordinates: 30°57′33″N 87°17′35″W

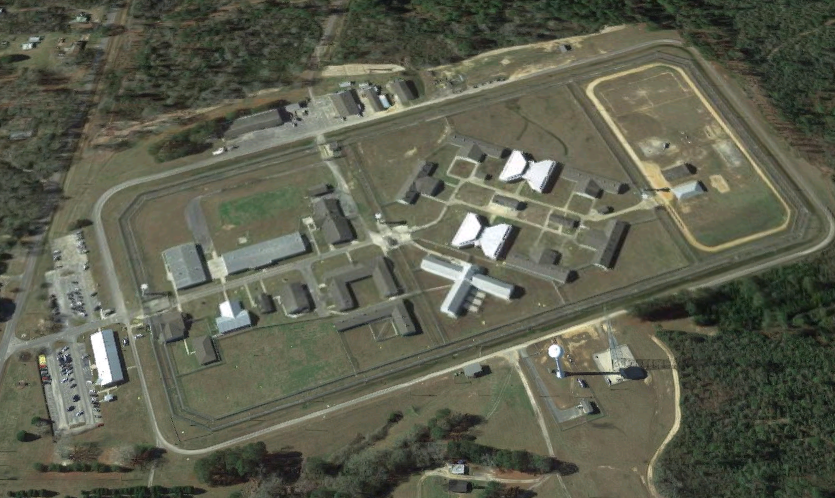
- Aerial view of Century Correctional Institution
- Interactive map of Century Correctional Institution
- Location: 400 Tedder Road Century, Florida
- Status: Operational
- Security class: Minimum, medium, close, and maximum
- Capacity: 1,883 = 1,515 (main unit) + 368 (satellite unit)
- Population: 1,595 = 1,379 (main unit) + 216 (satellite unit) (August 13, 2025)
- Opened: 1991
- Warden: Robert Flores

The Century Correctional Institution is a state prison for men located in Century, Escambia County, Florida, owned and operated by the Florida Department of Corrections.

This facility has a mix of security levels, including minimum, medium, close, and maximum, and houses adult male offenders. Century first opened in 1991 and has a maximum capacity of 1,883 prisoners.

== Notable Inmates ==
- Tyler Hadley (born 1993), a teenager who perpetrated the murders of Blake and Mary-Jo Hadley (his own parents).
- Ricky Chavis (born 1961), guilty of being an accessory in the murder of Terry King.
- Isaiah Chance guilty of various counts or murder and attempted Murder of Julio Foolio and friends that were with him.
- Johnathan Eddie Hartley (born 1994), convicted of second-degree murder in the murder of a pizza delivery driver in Jacksonville, Florida, in 2009. Johnathan was a subject in the documentary Human (2015 film).
