= Barrineau Park, Florida =

Unincorporated community in Florida, U.S.

Coordinates: 30°41′38″N 87°26′10″W

Barrineau Park is an unincorporated community in Escambia County, Florida, United States. It is approximately 5 miles (8.0 km) west of Molino and a few miles from the Perdido River. It is a rural community of low hills, farms, creeks and woods.

Barrineau Park is part of the Pensacola–Ferry Pass–Brent Metropolitan Statistical Area.

== History ==
It was named after William Capers Barrineau of South Carolina, who moved there in 1900 and bought over 11,000 acres (45 km^{2}) of land for turpentine and timber. After the timber supply was exhausted, he brought in about 50 families, (mostly German Hungarians), to farm the land in intensive small truck farms that actively produced vegetables for the market.

From the Book History of Escambia County Armstrong, Henry Clay, 1870-1930 pg 150. "Mr W.C. Barrineau also has made one of the biggest contributions to the county in the colony of industries Germans at Barrineau Park"

=== St. Elizabeth Catholic Church ===
Barrineau Park was colonized by the German Hungarians / Donauschwabens who farmed the land. Most were devout Catholics. In 1923, they built St. Elizabeth Catholic Church. During these years, Barrineau Park had a post office, railway station and stores. The forest reclaimed most of these structures and the community dwindled to a scattering of farms and homes until approximately the 1980s, when people started settling small farms in the area.

=== St Elizabeth's Catholic Cemetery ===
St Elizabeth's Catholic Cemetery is approximately 6 miles (9.7 km) from U.S. Route 29 on the Barrineau Park Road, due west. It is next to the church and approximately 2 acres (8,100 m^{2}) square. The settlement of Hungarian Germans came into Escambia County circa 1913, many from the Chicago and St. Louis areas. The cemetery is better kept and better marked than most in the county. The church was built circa 1922. There is also a parish house. The cemetery includes several Austrians, Hungarians and Donauschwabens, mostly of German descent. There are approximately 20 unmarked graves.

=== Slave Cemetery ===
There is also an unmarked slave graveyard in Barrineau Park. US 29 North to State Road 97. Left on SR 97 to Sunshine Hill Road, at third curve continue straight through. The cemetery is behind houses and is not marked, although residents know of it. This area was once part of the extensive land holdings of the Morgan Family in early history.

=== Barrineau Park School ===
Barrineau Park School is now restored and is the Barrineau Park Community Center.

=== Barrineau Park Historical Society ===
Barrineau Park also has a Historical Society

THE BARRINEAU PARK HISTORICAL SOCIETY INC PO BOX 508 MOLINO, FL 32577-0508
