= Charles Rouse =

American politician

Charles Rouse (c. 1837 - 1891) was a laborer and state legislator in Florida. He represented Escambia County in the Florida House of Representatives in 1874 and was an Escambia County Commissioner. He lived in Molino, Florida and did timber work for Epping, Barr & Co.

He was born in North Carolina. He was sworn in with fellow representative of Escambia County John Sunday who was also African American. He died in Escambia County, Florida.

== See also ==
- African American officeholders from the end of the Civil War until before 1900
