= Florida State Road 292 =

State highway in Florida, United States

State Road 292

Route information
- Maintained by FDOT
- Length: 23.632 mi (38.032 km)

Major junctions
- West end: SR 182 in Orange Beach, AL
- SR 295 in Warrington; US 90 / US 98 in Pensacola
- North end: US 29 in Brent

Location
- Country: United States
- State: Florida
- Counties: Escambia

Highway system
- Florida State Highway System; Interstate; US; State; Former; Pre‑1945; Toll; Scenic
← SR 291	→ SR 293

State Road 292 (SR 292) is a major thoroughfare in the Pensacola, Florida metropolitan area. Locally, it is known as Pace Boulevard, Barrancas Avenue, Gulf Beach Highway, Sorrento Road, and Perdido Key Drive.

== Route description ==
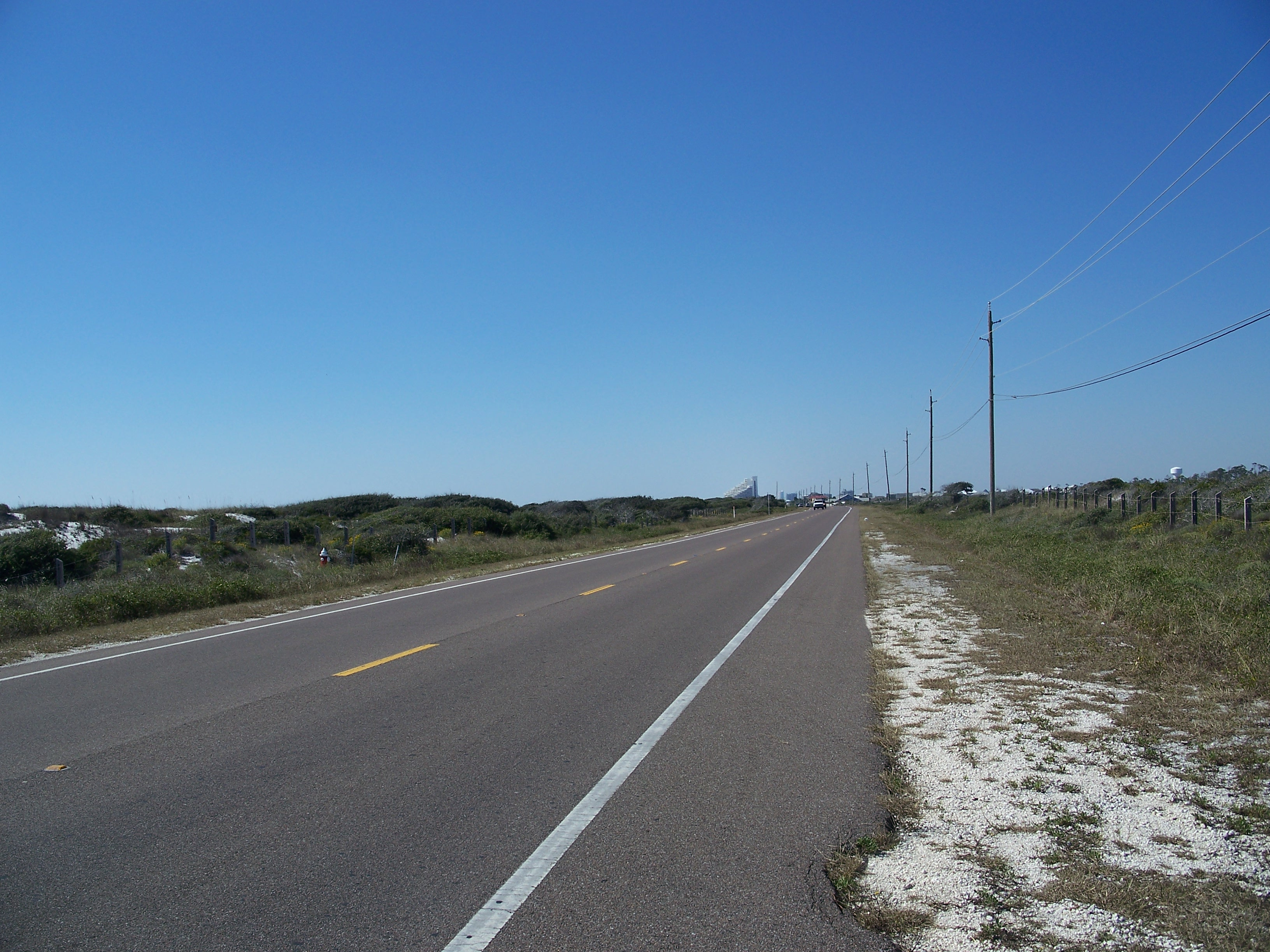
SR 292 westbound through Perdido Key

State Road 292 begins on Perdido Key at a signalized pedestrian crosswalk along the Alabama-Florida state line at the east end of Alabama State Route 182, where the state line itself is used as a tourist attraction and is home to the Flora-Bama bar and dance club. The street name changes from Perdido Beach Boulevard in Alabama to Perdido Key Drive in Florida. At the Perdido Skye Condominiums, the road starts to curve more towards the northeast where it intersects Johnson Beach Road, then runs straight north until it reaches Gongora Drive where it curves northeast. The last intersection on Perdido Key is River Road, and from there it crosses the Theo Baars Bridge (formerly the Gulf Beach Bridge) over the Gulf Intracoastal Waterway. The first major intersection after this bridge is CR 292A (Gulf Beach Highway), which is also shared by Innerarity Point Road. At this intersection, the street name of SR 292 changes from Perdido Key Drive to Sorrento Road. The route curves more towards the northeast only to turn back north again as it crosses a bridge over Bayou Garcon. After the bridge, SR 292 turns north-northeast, and after the Perdido Bay Country Club Estates development, turns northeast, where it has an intersection with CR 293 (Bauer Road). A much more significant intersection is encountered in the form of a four-lane divided state highway known as Florida State Road 173 (Blue Angel Parkway), a local street leading to the Naval Aviation Museum.

CR 292A ends on the south side of the road, which is also where Sorrento Road ends, and SR 292 becomes part of Gulf Beach Highway. A block and a half after this on the opposite side is the southern terminus of CR 297 (Dog Track Road), a road named for the Pensacola Greyhound Track. Crossing a bridge over Soldiers Creek, it enters Beach Haven. The first major intersection in the community is the southern terminus of SR 752, which continues south as a local street called South Fairfield Drive, leading to a local park with the same name. Later in Warrington another major intersection can be found at SR 295 (Navy Boulevard) and Gulf Beach Highway suddenly becomes Barrancas Avenue. The road becomes a four-lane divided highway just before the intersection with Old Barrancas Avenue, then suddenly becomes a six-lane highway wide as it approaches a bridge over Bayou Chico, where it enters the city of Pensacola. SR 292 makes a sharp left turn onto Pace Avenue to the north, while Barrancas Avenue continues to the northeast. After two railroad crossings between West Main Street and West Government Street, the road has a major intersection with West Garden Street, where the western terminus of U.S. Route 98 Business (US 98 Bus.) begins, and eastbound US 98 joins SR 292 in a concurrency. The concurrency ends at and then US 90 (West Cervantes Street), where US 98 joins that route until they reach North Ninth Avenue. SR 295 is encountered a second time at the intersection of West Fairfield Drive. Pace Avenue curves slightly to the northwest then the northeast before finally terminating at US 29, locally known as North Palafox Street.

== Major intersections ==
The entire route is in Escambia County.

Location	mi	km	Destinations	Notes
	0.000	0.000	SR 182 west	Alabama state line
Gulf Beach	5.566	8.958	Johnson Beach Road - Gulf Islands National Seashore	
Perdido Key	6.200	9.978	Gongora Drive	west end of state maintenance
	6.51	10.48	Theo Baars Bridge over Gulf Intracoastal Waterway	
	6.956	11.195	CR 292A east (Gulf Beach Highway) / Innerarity Point Road – Naval Aviation Museum	
	9.022	14.520	CR 293 (Bauer Road) – Big Lagoon State Park	
	12.030	19.360	SR 173 (Blue Angel Parkway) – Pensacola Lighthouse, truck route to NAS Pensacola, Airport	
Pleasant Grove	12.852	20.683	CR 292A west (Gulf Beach Highway)	
Pleasant Grove	12.988	20.902	CR 297 north (Dog Track Road)	
Beach Haven	15.354	24.710	SR 727 north (South Fairfield Drive)	
Warrington	17.246	27.755	SR 295 (Navy Boulevard) – Naval Air Station Pensacola, Naval Aviation Museum, Pensacola Lighthouse	
Warrington	17.589	28.307	Old Corry Field Road (CR 295A north)	
Pensacola	19.44	31.29	Bayou Chico Bridge over Bayou Chico	
Pensacola	20.377	32.794	US 98 west / US 98 Bus. east (West Garden Street / SR 30)	south end of US 98 overlap
Pensacola	20.848	33.552	West Jackson Street (CR 298A west)	
Pensacola	20.985	33.772	US 90 / US 98 east (West Cervantes Street / SR 10A)	north end of US 98 overlap
Brent	22.678	36.497	SR 295 (West Fairfield Drive)	
Brent	23.632	38.032	US 29 (North Palafox Street / SR 95)	
1.000 mi = 1.609 km; 1.000 km = 0.621 mi: Concurrency terminus
