= Crescent Lake (Pensacola) =

Brent Bayou Lakes
- Location within Florida
- Location: Brent, Florida
- Coordinates: 30°27′N 87°16′W
- Type: reservoir
- Primary inflows: Perdido River
- Primary outflows: Marcus Bayou
- Basin countries: United States
- Surface elevation: 11 m (36 ft)

Crescent Lake is a man made lake in Pensacola, Florida that was built for the Crescent Lake Subdivision that started selling homes in 1960. It is a natural spring fed lake that was created by a dam being built. The dam broke once in 1969 and was rebuilt. It broke again in 2014. In 2017 it was rebuilt.

== Marcus Bayou ==
The Marcus Bayou is a stream and bayou that connects Crescent Lake to the outer lakes of the Crescent Lake. Including The Marcus Cottage Lakes and Turners Creek. The bayou also connects to the Perdido River on a very thin strip of water.

== Bellshead Branch ==
The Bellshead Branch was built into the connection of the Crescent Lake for the Marcus Cottage Lakes and Apartments. It made a stream named the Marcus Bayou.

== Turners Creek ==
Turners Lake is a private owned lake by Turner Apartments that connects to the Marcus Bayou.
