= Gonzalez, Florida =

- Census-designated place
- Location in Escambia County and the state of Florida
- Coordinates: 30°36′20″N 87°16′32″W
- Country: United States
- State: Florida
- County: Escambia

Area
  - Total: 15.35 sq mi (39.76 km^{2})
  - Land: 15.14 sq mi (39.21 km^{2})
  - Water: 0.21 sq mi (0.54 km^{2})
- Elevation: 154 ft (47 m)

Population (2020)
  - Total: 14,586
  - Density: 963.4/sq mi (371.96/km^{2})
- Time zone: UTC-6 (Central (CST))
  - Summer (DST): UTC-5 (CDT)
- ZIP code: 32533
- Area code: 850
- FIPS code: 12-26700
- GNIS feature ID: 2402537

Gonzalez is a census-designated place (CDP) in Escambia County, Florida. Gonzalez is located north of Pensacola, and is considered to be within Cantonment. Tate High School, the largest public school in Escambia County, is located in the Gonzalez area. As of the 2020 United States census, the population was 14,586, up from 13,273 at the 2010 census. It is part of the Pensacola—Ferry Pass—Brent, Florida Metropolitan Statistical Area.

== History ==
The village of Gonzalez has also been called Gonzalia, named after the Gonzalez family who owned a farm in the area. Manuel Gonzalez, the patriarch of the family, was originally from Spain. He had arrived in the New World sometime around 1790. He served as an Indian Agent under Francisco Bouligny in New Orleans, before eventually arriving in Pensacola.

During the American Civil War, Gonzalez was home to a Confederate storage facility run by Manuel Gonzalez’s son, Samuel Z. Gonzalez. The Gonzalez farm was also the location of a military skirmish between Union forces headquartered out of Fort Barrancas and Confederate troops.

== Geography ==
According to the United States Census Bureau, the CDP has a total area of 15.3 square miles (39.7 km^{2}), of which 15.1 square miles (39.1 km^{2}) is land and 0.19 square miles (0.5 km^{2}), or 1.37%, is water.

== Demographics ==
Historical population
Census	Pop.	Note	%±
1990	7,669		—
2000	11,365		48.2%
2010	13,273		16.8%
2020	14,586		9.9%
U.S. Decennial Census

=== 2020 census ===
As of the 2020 census, Gonzalez had a population of 14,586. The median age was 42.4 years. 21.3% of residents were under the age of 18 and 19.5% were 65 years of age or older. For every 100 females there were 94.1 males, and for every 100 females age 18 and over there were 91.7 males age 18 and over.

99.7% of residents lived in urban areas, while 0.3% lived in rural areas.

There were 5,578 households in Gonzalez, of which 29.7% had children under the age of 18 living in them. Of all households, 55.7% were married-couple households, 14.5% were households with a male householder and no spouse or partner present, and 24.6% were households with a female householder and no spouse or partner present. About 21.8% of all households were made up of individuals and 10.4% had someone living alone who was 65 years of age or older.

There were 5,824 housing units, of which 4.2% were vacant. The homeowner vacancy rate was 1.1% and the rental vacancy rate was 5.2%.

Racial composition as of the 2020 census
Race	Number	Percent
White	11,110	76.2%
Black or African American	1,708	11.7%
American Indian and Alaska Native	136	0.9%
Asian	288	2.0%
Native Hawaiian and Other Pacific Islander	12	0.1%
Some other race	201	1.4%
Two or more races	1,131	7.8%
Hispanic or Latino (of any race)	619	4.2%

=== Demographic estimates ===
According to U.S. Census Bureau QuickFacts, Gonzalez had 2.64 persons per household, a population density of 963.3 people per square mile, and 5.4% of the population was under age 5.

QuickFacts also reported 1,242 veterans and that 4.8% of residents were foreign born.

94.5% of households had a computer and 93.8% had a broadband internet subscription. 94.2% had a high school diploma or equivalent, and 31.9% had a bachelor's degree or higher. Median household income was $76,314, per capita income was $35,061, and 4.0% of the population lived below the poverty threshold.
