= Murder of Terry King =

2001 murder

- Location: Cantonment, Florida, U.S.
- Date: November 26, 2001; 24 years ago c. 1:30 a.m. (CST)
- Attack type: Murder by bludgeoning, patricide, arson
- Weapon: Baseball bat
- Victims: Terry Lee King, aged 40
- Perpetrators: Derek King; Alex King; Ricky Chavis
- Motive: Unclear
- Charges: Derek and Alex: First-degree murder Chavis: First-degree murder; False imprisonment; Child molestation (10 counts); Kidnapping; Accessory to first-degree murder after-the-fact
- Verdict: Derek and Alex: Guilty on lesser charge of second-degree murder (overturned); Pleaded guilty to third-degree murder Ricky: Guilty of false imprisonment and accessory to murder Not guilty on remaining charges
- Convictions: Derek and Alex: Third-degree murder Chavis: Accessory to first-degree murder and false imprisonment
- Sentence: Derek: 8 years in prison (paroled after 7 years); Alex: 7 years in prison (paroled after 6 years); Chavis: 35 years in prison

The murder of Terry King occurred on November 26, 2001. Terry Lee King, a resident of Cantonment, Florida, U.S., was bludgeoned to death by his two children, 13-year old Derek and 12-year old Alex King.

== Murder ==
On November 26, 2001, Derek, accompanied by Alex, beat their father to death with an aluminum baseball bat. The boys then set fire to the family's home, in Cantonment, Florida (near Pensacola) in hopes of concealing their crime. Ricky Chavis, a family friend, was convicted of being an accessory to the murder after he hid the boys in his trailer home after the murder and washed the blood from their clothes. Chavis was also accused of molesting Alex King, but later acquitted. Terry King was 40 years old at the time of his death.

The boys claimed that they committed the murder to end "mental abuse" including being "stared down" and spanked. They would change their testimony several times, first claiming that they had murdered their father on their own, then that Chavis had convinced them to kill Terry, and finally that Chavis had killed Terry King and convinced them to take the fall. Alex also testified that he had been raped by Chavis. Chavis was acquitted of child molestation in a separate trial.

== Trial ==
In an unconventional move, the prosecution tried both Chavis and the King brothers for the same crime. Chavis was acquitted, and while a second degree murder conviction was obtained for the King brothers on September 6, 2002, the judge threw the conviction out because he believed that the boys' right to due process was violated. The prosecution and defense resolved the case in mediation, avoiding a new trial. Both brothers pleaded guilty to third degree murder in November 2002.

== Impact ==
The King case received a huge amount of media attention and inspired much controversy. A book entitled A Perversion of Justice: A Southern Tragedy of Murder, Lies and Innocence Betrayed was published that argues that the boys were innocent. In response to the accusations made in the book, David Rimmer, assistant state attorney for the state of Florida stated: "There will always be people who believe Derek and Alex are innocent. Just like there will always be people who believe that Michael Jackson is innocent." Rimmer went on to argue that the case made by the book's authors, Kathryn Medico and Mollye Barrows, was naive and that they "may never understand" the truth.

== Incarceration ==
In 2002, Derek King was sentenced to eight years in prison, while Alex received seven years. In 2005, Alex King (then age 15) was charged with attempting to escape from the juvenile prison in which he was incarcerated.

At the age of 18, Alex King was released from custody on April 9, 2008, after serving six years for his part in his father's death. Derek King was released at the age of 20 on March 7, 2009, after serving seven years for his role.

== Aftermath ==
Alex was arrested in 2011 for violating terms of parole after leaving the scene of an accident. Alex King died on April 23, 2024 of a drug overdose in Montana.

== Media ==
- A book by Kathryn Medico and Mollye Barrows entitled A Perversion of Justice: A Southern Tragedy of Murder, Lies and Innocence Betrayed was published that argues that the boys were innocent.
- In a special broadcast entitled "Second Chances", Dateline NBC interviewed the two brothers about the events and filmed their first get-together after years of separation.
- Investigation Discovery show Evil Kin S01E05 "Deadly Darlings" chronicles the case.
- American Justice S12E21 "Blood Brothers: The Derek and Alex King Case" presents the case.

== See also ==
- List of youngest killers
- Patricide
