= Century, Florida =

- Town
- Motto(s): Traditional Values. Today's Technology. Dawn of a New Century; A Century That Lasts Forever
- Location in Escambia County and the state of Florida
- Coordinates: 30°26′28″N 87°15′20″W
- Country: United States
- State: Florida
- County: Escambia
- Settled: 1901
- Incorporated: 1945

Government
  - Type: Mayor-Council
  - Mayor: Benjamin Boutwell
  - Council President: Dynette Lewis
  - Councilmembers: Henry Cunningham, Shelisa M. Abraham, Lizbeth A. “Sparkie” Harrison, and John Bass
  - Town Administrator: Dave Murzin
  - Town Clerk: Carrie Moore

Area
  - Total: 3.34 sq mi (8.64 km^{2})
  - Land: 3.22 sq mi (8.34 km^{2})
  - Water: 0.12 sq mi (0.31 km^{2})
- Elevation: 82 ft (25 m)

Population (2020)
  - Total: 1,713
  - Density: 532.2/sq mi (205.47/km^{2})
- Time zone: UTC-6 (Central (CST))
  - Summer (DST): UTC-5 (CDT)
- ZIP code: 32535
- Area code(s): 850, 448
- FIPS code: 12-11362
- GNIS feature ID: 2406251
- Website: www.townofcenturyflorida.com

Century is a town in northeastern Escambia County, Florida, United States. Per the 2020 census, the population was 1,713, up from 1,698 at the 2010 census. It is part of the Pensacola–Ferry Pass–Brent, Florida Metropolitan Statistical Area.

== History ==
Century was founded in 1901 as a sawmill company town, and named because 1901 was the first year of the 20th century. A post office has been in operation at Century since 1901. It was officially incorporated as the Town of Century in 1945.

== Geography ==
The Town of Century is located on the Florida Panhandle in North Florida.

According to the United States Census Bureau, the town has a total area of 3.4 square miles (8.7 km^{2}), of which 3.2 square miles (8.4 km^{2}) is land and 0.12 square miles (0.3 km^{2}), or 3.69%, is water.

Century is located in the western highlands of Florida. This physiographic province of the northern Gulf Coast region is made up of sand, silt, and clay hills. These highlands are deeply incised by creeks and rivers. Century is located on the western edge of the Escambia River floodplain. A small portion of the town (the eastern side) is within the floodplain itself. Most of the community, however, is located above the floodplain on level to gently sloping hillsides.

Century's roadway network is highly irregular. It does not conform to the state of Florida's section, township and range survey system, for two reasons. The first is because Spanish land grants were issued along the Escambia River in the 16th and 17th centuries. These boundaries established a unique survey system that contorted east-to-west survey boundaries once Florida became a state and a state survey system was adopted, at which time previously existing survey systems were "grandfathered" in. The second reason for an irregular roadway and property boundary system is due to the community originally being built around the Louisville and Nashville Railroad (now the CSX railway). Automobile highways were eventually constructed, and closely paralleled the railway. U.S. Route 29 (US 29), a more modern highway, was constructed and moved many of the commercial operations west of the small original core of the community (now mostly located within the Alger-Sullivan Lumber Company Residential Historic District).

US 29 is used by residents of Escambia County to reach points north. Alabama State Route 113 leads north from the state line to Interstate 65 and provides the area with a route to Montgomery, Birmingham and Atlanta. From a southbound perspective, Century is en route between these major cities and the coastal beaches at Pensacola Beach and Perdido Key in Florida.

Century is the western terminus of State Road 4, which leads east to the communities of Jay, Munson, Baker, and Milligan.

Fresh water supplies are abundant, with water being withdrawn as groundwater from the local sand and gravel aquifer.

In 1970, oil was discovered in the nearby community of Jay. Oil was also discovered near the town of Century, especially to its northeast. Oil became important to the local economy during the last quarter of the 20th century.

Gravel and sand is mined in open pits in and near Century. These natural mineral deposits are essential to supporting the construction industries in nearby Pensacola and Mobile, especially for use as aggregate materials in concrete.

Timber and pulpwood are other valuable natural commodities of the area. Nearby papermills at Cantonment, and Brewton, Alabama, provide a market for cut pulpwood. Timber processing is conducted by another industry about 10 miles (16 km) south of Century.

=== Climate ===
The climate in this area is characterized by hot, humid summers and generally mild winters. According to the Köppen climate classification, the Town of Century has a humid subtropical climate zone (Cfa).

== Demographics ==
Historical population
Census	Pop.	Note	%±
1950	395		—
1960	462		17.0%
1970	329		−28.8%
1980	495		50.5%
1990	1,989		301.8%
2000	1,714		−13.8%
2010	1,698		−0.9%
2020	1,713		0.9%
U.S. Decennial Census; 2010 2020

=== Racial and ethnic composition ===
Century town, Florida – Racial and ethnic composition Note: the US Census treats Hispanic/Latino as an ethnic category. This table excludes Latinos from the racial categories and assigns them to a separate category. Hispanics/Latinos may be of any race.
Race / Ethnicity (NH = Non-Hispanic)	Pop 2000	Pop 2010	Pop 2020	% 2000	% 2010	% 2020
White alone (NH)	667	669	631	38.91%	39.40%	36.84%
Black or African American alone (NH)	964	948	948	56.24%	55.83%	55.34%
Native American or Alaska Native alone (NH)	3	7	11	0.18%	0.41%	0.64%
Asian alone (NH)	10	8	2	0.58%	0.47%	0.12%
Native Hawaiian or Pacific Islander alone (NH)	1	0	11	0.06%	0.00%	0.64%
Other race alone (NH)	6	0	14	0.35%	0.00%	0.82%
Mixed race or Multiracial (NH)	35	47	67	2.04%	2.77%	3.91%
Hispanic or Latino (any race)	28	19	29	1.63%	1.12%	1.69%
Total	1,714	1,698	1,713	100.00%	100.00%	100.00%

=== 2020 census ===
As of the 2020 census, Century had a population of 1,713. The median age was 39.1 years. 26.6% of residents were under the age of 18 and 20.5% of residents were 65 years of age or older. For every 100 females there were 84.2 males, and for every 100 females age 18 and over there were 75.8 males age 18 and over.

0.0% of residents lived in urban areas, while 100.0% lived in rural areas.

There were 661 households in Century, of which 37.2% had children under the age of 18 living in them. Of all households, 23.8% were married-couple households, 22.5% were households with a male householder and no spouse or partner present, and 46.3% were households with a female householder and no spouse or partner present. About 32.2% of all households were made up of individuals and 12.9% had someone living alone who was 65 years of age or older.

There were 767 housing units, of which 13.8% were vacant. The homeowner vacancy rate was 0.8% and the rental vacancy rate was 11.5%.

The 2020 American Community Survey 5-year estimates reported 413 families residing in the town.

=== 2010 census ===
As of the 2010 United States census, there were 1,698 people residing in the town. The 2010 ACS 5-year estimates reported 699 households and 449 families residing in the town.

=== 2000 census ===
As of the census of 2000, there were 1,714 people, 680 households, and 448 families residing in the town. The population density was 522.5 inhabitants per square mile (201.7/km^{2}). There were 800 housing units at an average density of 243.9 per square mile (94.2/km^{2}). The racial makeup of the town was 39.67% White, 56.65% African American, 0.58% Native American, 0.64% Asian, 0.06% Pacific Islander, 0.35% from other races, and 2.04% from two or more races. Hispanic or Latino of any race were 1.63% of the population.

In 2000, there were 680 households, out of which 29.0% had children under the age of 18 living with them, 36.5% were married couples living together, 25.9% had a female householder with no husband present, and 34.1% were non-families. 31.8% of all households were made up of individuals, and 18.1% had someone living alone who was 65 years of age or older. The average household size was 2.52 and the average family size was 3.21.

In 2000, in the town, the population was spread out, with 30.0% under the age of 18, 6.9% from 18 to 24, 24.0% from 25 to 44, 21.9% from 45 to 64, and 17.2% who were 65 years of age or older. The median age was 37 years. For every 100 females, there were 80.6 males. For every 100 females age 18 and over, there were 75.3 males.

In 2000, the median income for a household in the town was $20,703, and the median income for a family was $28,241. Males had a median income of $26,932 versus $17,390 for females. The per capita income for the town was $10,412. About 24.5% of families and 30.1% of the population were below the poverty line, including 41.4% of those under age 18 and 26.1% of those age 65 or over.

== Economy ==
A Florida prison known as Century Correctional Institution is the only major employer in the region. This facility employs a full-time staff of 401, which is almost 25% of the entire population of Century.

== Education ==
Residents of Century and the surrounding area in Escambia County are served by the Escambia County School District.

Century is within the zones of the following schools:

- Bratt Elementary School (Century, Florida)
- Ernest Ward Middle School (Walnut Hill, Florida)
- Northview High School (Century, Florida)
- Pensacola State College (Century, Florida)
