= Goulding, Florida =

- Census-designated place
- Location in Escambia County and the state of Florida
- Coordinates: 30°26′23″N 87°13′48″W
- Country: United States
- State: Florida
- County: Escambia

Area
  - Total: 1.19 sq mi (3.07 km^{2})
  - Land: 1.19 sq mi (3.07 km^{2})
  - Water: 0 sq mi (0.00 km^{2})
- Elevation: 69 ft (21 m)

Population (2020)
  - Total: 3,392
  - Density: 2,860.5/sq mi (1,104.46/km^{2})
- Time zone: UTC-6 (Central (CST))
  - Summer (DST): UTC-5 (CDT)
- FIPS code: 12-26925
- GNIS feature ID: 2402541

Goulding is a census-designated place (CDP) in Escambia County, Florida, United States. The population was 3,392 at the 2020 census, down from 4,102 at the 2010 census. It is part of the Pensacola–Ferry Pass–Brent, Florida Metropolitan Statistical Area.

== Geography ==
According to the United States Census Bureau, the CDP has a total area of 1.2 square miles (3.1 km^{2}), all land.

== Demographics ==
Historical population
Census	Pop.	Note	%±
1980	5,352		—
1990	4,159		−22.3%
2000	4,484		7.8%
2010	4,102		−8.5%
2020	3,392		−17.3%

=== Racial and ethnic composition ===
Goulding CDP, Florida – Racial and ethnic composition Note: the US Census treats Hispanic/Latino as an ethnic category. This table excludes Latinos from the racial categories and assigns them to a separate category. Hispanics/Latinos may be of any race.
Race / Ethnicity (NH = Non-Hispanic)	Pop 2000	Pop 2010	Pop 2020	% 2000	% 2010	% 2020
White alone (NH)	1,100	1,011	899	24.53%	24.65%	26.50%
Black or African American alone (NH)	3,224	2,513	2,322	71.90%	61.26%	68.46%
Native American or Alaska Native alone (NH)	15	32	4	0.33%	0.78%	0.12%
Asian alone (NH)	27	77	13	0.60%	1.88%	0.38%
Native Hawaiian or Pacific Islander alone (NH)	1	1	2	0.02%	0.02%	0.06%
Other race (NH)	4	1	6	0.09%	0.02%	0.18%
Mixed race or Multiracial (NH)	44	52	77	0.98%	1.27%	2.27%
Hispanic or Latino (any race)	69	415	69	1.54%	10.12%	2.03%
Total	4,484	4,102	3,392	100.00%	100.00%	100.00%

=== 2020 census ===
As of the 2020 census, Goulding had a population of 3,392. The median age was 39.0 years. 14.9% of residents were under the age of 18 and 15.4% were 65 years of age or older. For every 100 females, there were 141.4 males, and for every 100 females age 18 and over, there were 147.0 males age 18 and over.

100.0% of residents lived in urban areas, while 0.0% lived in rural areas.

There were 851 households, of which 25.9% had children under the age of 18 living in them. Of all households, 16.6% were married-couple households, 29.4% were households with a male householder and no spouse or partner present, and 46.4% were households with a female householder and no spouse or partner present. About 38.1% of all households were made up of individuals, and 14.9% had someone living alone who was 65 years of age or older.

There were 1,088 housing units, of which 21.8% were vacant. The homeowner vacancy rate was 3.6% and the rental vacancy rate was 21.7%.

=== 2000 census ===
As of the census of 2000, there were 4,484 people, 1,298 households, and 624 families residing in the CDP. The population density was 3,643.2 inhabitants per square mile (1,406.6/km^{2}). There were 1,437 housing units at an average density of 1,167.6 per square mile (450.8/km^{2}). The racial makeup of the CDP was 25.00% White, 72.46% African American, 0.36% Native American, 0.60% Asian, 0.02% Pacific Islander, 0.45% from other races, and 1.12% from two or more races. Hispanic or Latino of any race were 1.54% of the population.

There were 1,298 households, out of which 15.4% had children under the age of 18 living with them, 19.0% were married couples living together, 23.3% had a female householder with no husband present, and 51.9% were non-families. 47.1% of all households were made up of individuals, and 27.5% had someone living alone who was 65 years of age or older. The average household size was 2.15 and the average family size was 3.20.

In the CDP, the population was spread out, with 14.3% under the age of 18, 12.3% from 18 to 24, 34.4% from 25 to 44, 18.8% from 45 to 64, and 20.1% who were 65 years of age or older. The median age was 39 years. For every 100 females, there were 137.9 males. For every 100 females age 18 and over, there were 141.6 males.

The median income for a household in the CDP was $14,750, and the median income for a family was $22,969. Males had a median income of $18,606 versus $17,500 for females. The per capita income for the CDP was $8,876. About 25.0% of families and 30.4% of the population were below the poverty line, including 39.1% of those under age 18 and 30.7% of those age 65 or over.

== See also ==
- Brownsville-Brent-Goulding, Florida, a single census area recorded during the 1950 Census
