= Alger–Sullivan Lumber Company Residential Historic District =

Historic district in Florida, United States

- Alger–Sullivan Lumber Company; Residential Historic District
- U.S. National Register of Historic Places
- U.S. Historic district
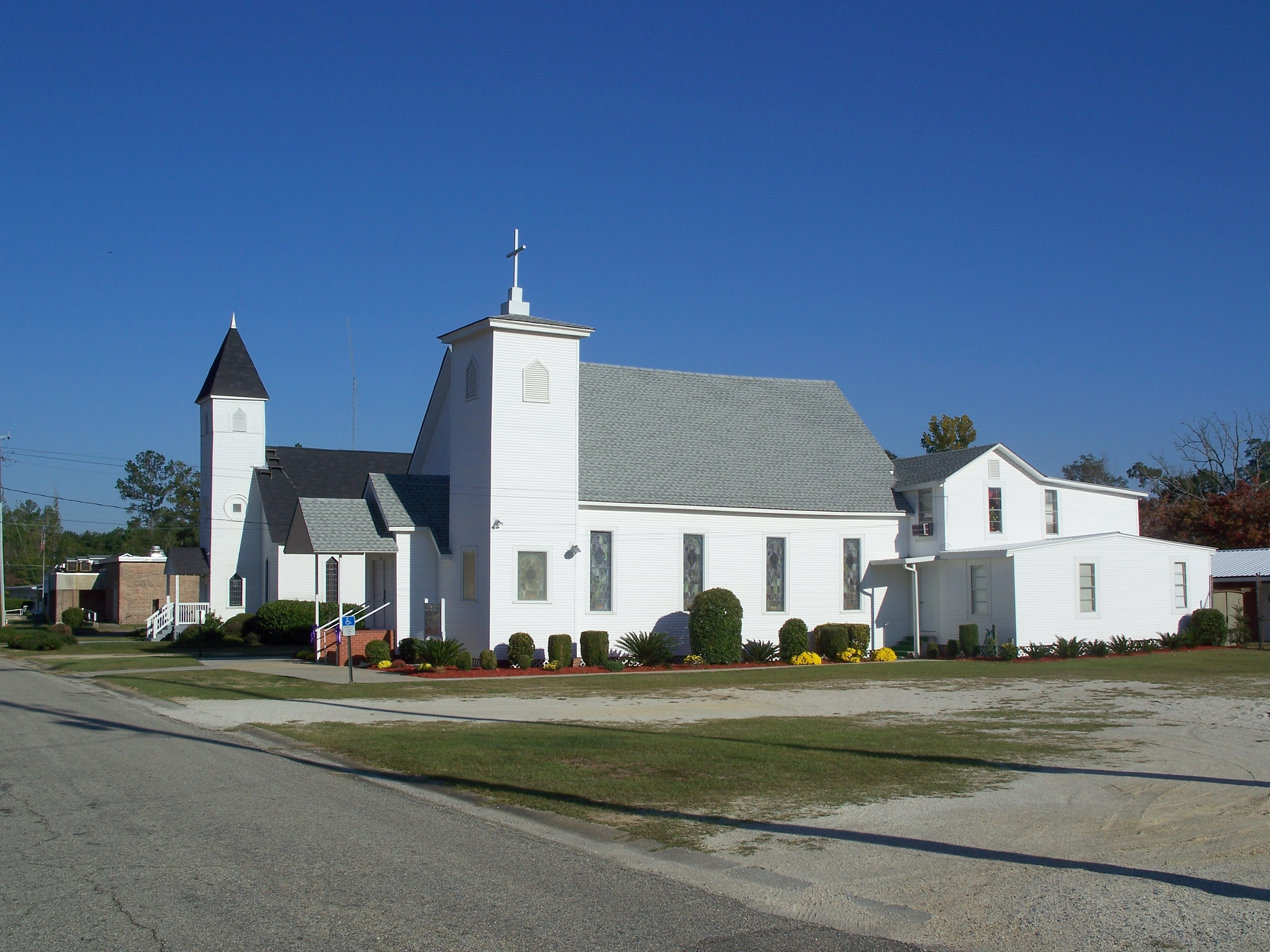

- Location within Florida Location within the United States
- Location: Roughly bounded by Pinewood Ave, Front St, Jefferson Ave, Church St, and Mayo St, Century, Florida
- Coordinates: 30°58′7″N 87°15′26″W
- Area: 23 acres (9.3 ha)
- Built: 1901
- NRHP reference No.: 89001586
- Added to NRHP: September 28, 1989

The Alger–Sullivan Lumber Company Residential Historic District is a historic district in Century, Florida. The district is bounded by Pinewood Avenue, Front Street, Jefferson Avenue, Church Street, and Mayo Street, encompasses approximately 23 acres (93,000 m^{2}), and contains 45 historic buildings. On September 28, 1989, it was added to the U.S. National Register of Historic Places.
