= Muscogee, Florida =

- Ghost town
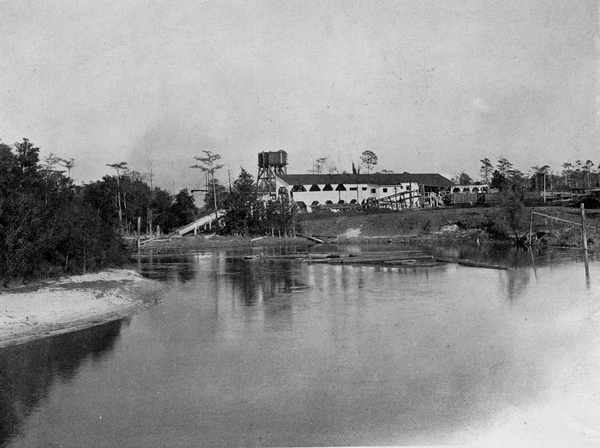
- Saw mill, Muscogee, Florida, ca. 1903

- Location within the state of Florida
- Coordinates: 30°36′21″N 87°23′48″W
- Country: United States
- State: Florida
- County: Escambia
- Elevation: 33 ft (10 m)
- Time zone: UTC-6 (Central (CST))
  - Summer (DST): UTC-5 (CDT)
- GNIS feature ID: 295473

Muscogee is a ghost town located twenty miles northwest of Pensacola, Florida, United States, in Escambia County, along the Perdido River. Named after the Muscogee Lumber Company, formed by Georgia lumber men, the town was founded in 1857 by a group of lumbermen to harvest timber from the surrounding pine forests. They and the following company clearcut the timber, and once the forests were gone, lumbering ended in this area.

In 1889, the Southern States Land and Lumber Company bought the founding company; harvested pine trees were brought to the mills from Florida and Alabama by river, oxcart and rail. The company had five locomotives and seventy cars, and built approximately 50 miles of logging railroad and spur track. Its tugboat worked on the Perdido River, maneuvering log booms. At the peak of production, the logging camps and associated four lumber mills employed over 1,000 men from the area. The town had a Southern States commissary and other stores, and schools to serve the children of the families.

In one year, the company exported 60 million feet of lumber: 13 million feet to the eastern United States, and the remainder to markets nations of Central and South America, the West Indies, Europe and Africa. Businessmen stayed at the hotel or boarding houses in town, which was served by the Louisville and Nashville Railroad and the Pensacola, Alabama, and Tennessee Railroad.

In 1925 Southern States began to liquidate its holdings. It abandoned the mills, and in 1928 sold the town and surrounding 2300 acres to B.C. Davis, a land owner and turpentine operator from DeFuniak Springs. At the time, the town had a population of 300 to 400. Gradually the residents moved away to other places where there was work and a future.

Today, there isn’t much left of the old Muscogee. However, a graveyard and a small community still exist nearby. The graveyard is heavily vandalized, with unmarked, damaged, and sunken tombstones. Concrete pieces of the old lumber wharf, which was destroyed in a fire in 1955, stand idle along the Pensacola Bay Bridge, with many stating they resemble castle turrets.

== Notable person ==
- Jackie Cochran, aviator, was born in Muscogee in 1906.
