= Ensley, Florida =

- Census-designated place
- Location in Escambia County and the state of Florida
- Coordinates: 30°31′18″N 87°15′26″W
- Country: United States
- State: Florida
- County: Escambia
- Established: 1980

Area
  - Total: 12.28 sq mi (31.80 km^{2})
  - Land: 12.22 sq mi (31.65 km^{2})
  - Water: 0.058 sq mi (0.15 km^{2})
- Elevation: 128 ft (39 m)

Population (2020)
  - Total: 23,817
  - Density: 1,949.0/sq mi (752.51/km^{2})
- Time zone: UTC-6 (Central (CST))
  - Summer (DST): UTC-5 (CDT)
- ZIP code: 32534
- Area code: 850
- FIPS code: 12-20925
- GNIS feature ID: 2402457

Ensley is a census-designated place (CDP) in Escambia County, Florida. It is a community located northwest of Pensacola. The population was 23,817 at the 2020 United States census, up from 20,602 at the 2010 Census. It is part of the Pensacola–Ferry Pass–Brent, Florida Metropolitan Statistical Area. Ensley is a transportation corridor for the Pensacola Area, with US 90 Alt, US 29, and I-10 running through Ensley.

== Geography ==
According to the United States Census Bureau, the CDP has a total area of 12.2 square miles (31.7 km^{2}), of which 12.2 square miles (31.5 km^{2}) is land and 0.077 square miles (0.2 km^{2}), or 0.56%, is water.

=== Climate ===
Climate data for Pensacola, Florida
Month	Jan	Feb	Mar	Apr	May	Jun	Jul	Aug	Sep	Oct	Nov	Dec	Year
Record high °F (°C)	81 (27)	82 (28)	86 (30)	96 (36)	102 (39)	103 (39)	106 (41)	104 (40)	98 (37)	95 (35)	87 (31)	81 (27)	106 (41)
Mean daily maximum °F (°C)	61.2 (16.2)	64.4 (18.0)	70.2 (21.2)	76.2 (24.6)	83.4 (28.6)	89.0 (31.7)	90.7 (32.6)	90.1 (32.3)	87.0 (30.6)	79.3 (26.3)	70.3 (21.3)	63.4 (17.4)	77.1 (25.1)
Mean daily minimum °F (°C)	42.8 (6.0)	45.4 (7.4)	51.7 (10.9)	57.6 (14.2)	65.8 (18.8)	72.1 (22.3)	74.5 (23.6)	74.2 (23.4)	70.4 (21.3)	59.6 (15.3)	51.1 (10.6)	44.7 (7.1)	59.2 (15.1)
Record low °F (°C)	5 (−15)	13 (−11)	22 (−6)	33 (1)	45 (7)	56 (13)	61 (16)	62 (17)	43 (6)	32 (0)	22 (−6)	11 (−12)	5 (−15)
Average precipitation inches (mm)	5.34 (136)	4.68 (119)	6.40 (163)	3.89 (99)	4.40 (112)	6.39 (162)	8.02 (204)	6.85 (174)	5.75 (146)	4.13 (105)	4.46 (113)	3.97 (101)	64.28 (1,633)
Average precipitation days (≥ 0.01 in)	9.5	8.4	8.7	6.5	7.5	10.2	13.4	11.9	9.5	4.8	7.8	8.9	107.1
Source: NOAA

== Demographics ==
Historical population
Census	Pop.	Note	%±
1980	14,422		—
1990	16,362		13.5%
2000	18,752		14.6%
2010	20,602		9.9%
2020	23,817		15.6%

=== 2020 census ===
As of the 2020 census, Ensley had a population of 23,817. The median age was 38.8 years. 20.3% of residents were under the age of 18 and 17.8% of residents were 65 years of age or older. For every 100 females there were 90.7 males, and for every 100 females age 18 and over there were 88.2 males age 18 and over.

100.0% of residents lived in urban areas, while 0.0% lived in rural areas.

There were 10,127 households in Ensley, of which 25.8% had children under the age of 18 living in them. Of all households, 35.4% were married-couple households, 21.1% were households with a male householder and no spouse or partner present, and 35.4% were households with a female householder and no spouse or partner present. About 32.2% of all households were made up of individuals and 12.2% had someone living alone who was 65 years of age or older.

There were 11,018 housing units, of which 8.1% were vacant. The homeowner vacancy rate was 1.6% and the rental vacancy rate was 8.6%.

Racial composition as of the 2020 census
Race	Number	Percent
White	13,653	57.3%
Black or African American	6,493	27.3%
American Indian and Alaska Native	210	0.9%
Asian	789	3.3%
Native Hawaiian and Other Pacific Islander	34	0.1%
Some other race	661	2.8%
Two or more races	1,977	8.3%
Hispanic or Latino (of any race)	1,767	7.4%

=== 2000 census ===
As of the 2000 census, there were 18,752 people, 7,533 households, and 5,039 families residing in the CDP. The population density was 1,519.9 inhabitants per square mile (586.8/km^{2}). There were 8,153 housing units at an average density of 660.8 per square mile (255.1/km^{2}). The racial makeup of the CDP was 66.90% White, 28.44% African American, 0.92% Native American, 1.15% Asian, 0.05% Pacific Islander, 0.64% from other races, and 1.90% from two or more races. Hispanic or Latino of any race were 2.08% of the population.

There were 7,533 households, out of which 29.9% had children under the age of 18 living with them, 45.9% were married couples living together, 16.5% had a female householder with no husband present, and 33.1% were non-families. 26.4% of all households were made up of individuals, and 8.7% had someone living alone who was 65 years of age or older. The average household size was 2.48 and the average family size was 3.00.

In the CDP, the population was spread out, with 25.2% under the age of 18, 9.9% from 18 to 24, 29.9% from 25 to 44, 22.7% from 45 to 64, and 12.3% who were 65 years of age or older. The median age was 36 years. For every 100 females, there were 91.5 males. For every 100 females age 18 and over, there were 88.3 males.

The median income for a household in the CDP was $30,632, and the median income for a family was $37,607. Males had a median income of $30,056 versus $20,667 for females. The per capita income for the CDP was $16,245. About 12.0% of families and 15.7% of the population were below the poverty line, including 23.3% of those under age 18 and 9.2% of those age 65 or over.

== Hurricanes ==
Ensley's location on the Florida Panhandle makes it vulnerable to hurricanes. Major hurricanes which have made landfall at or near Pensacola include Eloise (1975), Frederic (1979), Elena, Juan (1985), Erin (1995), Opal (1995), Georges (1998), Ivan (2004), Dennis (2005), and (Sally) (2020).
