= Saufley Field =

Military airport in Escambia County, Florida, US

NOLF Saufley Field
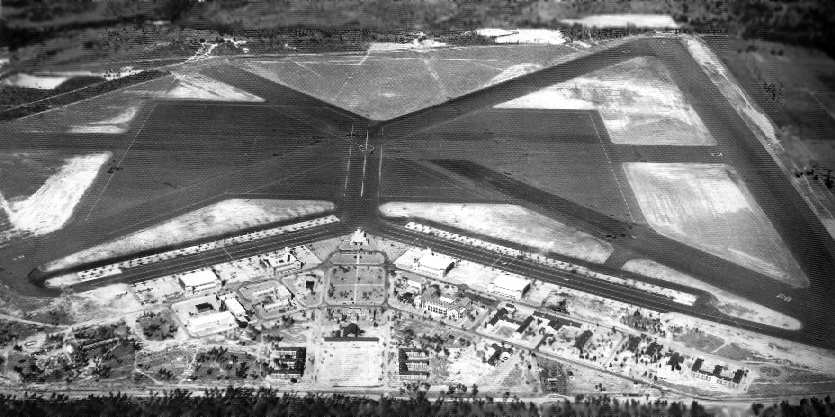
- IATA: NUN; ICAO: KNUN; FAA LID: NUN

Summary
- Airport type: Military
- Owner: U.S. Navy
- Location: Escambia County, near Bellview, Florida
- Elevation AMSL: 85 ft / 26 m
- Coordinates: 30°28′11″N 087°20′17″W
- Interactive map of NOLF Saufley Field

Runways
Direction	Length		Surface
Direction	ft	m	Surface
5/23	4,000	1,219	Asphalt
14/32	4,000	1,219	Asphalt
- Source: Federal Aviation Administration

Saufley Field (IATA: NUN, ICAO: KNUN, FAA LID: NUN) is a military airport and support facility located in unincorporated Escambia County, Florida, United States, five nautical miles (9 km) west of the central business district of Pensacola.

It is an active U.S. Navy facility and a former Naval Air Station, with its non-aviation activity now known as NETPDC Saufley Field. Although still listed as a Naval Landing Outlying Field (NOLF) in flight information publications (FLIP), its previous aeronautical role as NOLF Saufley Field in support of primary Student Naval Aviator training at Training Air Wing FIVE at nearby Naval Air Station Whiting Field has been suspended pending runway and airfield upgrades and it is currently listed in the FLIP as a "closed" facility for aircraft operations.

As Naval Education and Training Professional Development Center (NETPDC) Saufley Field, the facility also function as a shore installation for various naval activities that are part of the greater Pensacola naval complex. Saufley Field is located 10 miles (16 km) north of NAS Pensacola.

== History ==
The U.S. Navy leased what was then known as "Felton's Farm Field" for use as an outlying field of NAS Pensacola from 1933 and it purchased the 866.62 acres (3.5071 km^{2}) site on 16 August 1939. The base opened for operations on 26 August 1940 and is named after Lieutenant (junior grade) Richard C. Saufley, USN, Naval Aviator No. 14. Saufley was killed 9 June 1916 in the crash of a Curtiss Model E hydroplane, AH-8, off of Pensacola during an attempted long-endurance flight.

The installation was originally commissioned in 1943 as Naval Auxiliary Air Station Saufley Field and was redesignated Naval Air Station Saufley Field in 1968. NAS Saufley Field's historical role was the initial primary training of Student Naval Aviators (SNA). It continued in this mission through 1 December 1976, when it was home to Training Air Wing SEVEN (TRAWING 7) and its subordinate Training Squadron ONE (VT-1) and Training Squadron FIVE (VT-5), flying the T-34B Mentor in VT-1, and the land-based and T-28B Trojan and aircraft carrier landing-capable T-28C Trojan in VT-5, respectively. With the introduction of the T-34C Turbomentor version of the T-34 Mentor in 1976, TRAWING 7, VT-1 and VT-5 were disestablished in December 1976, NAS Saufley Field's control tower was closed, and its status as an active Naval Air Station was changed to that of an uncontrolled Naval Outlying Landing Field (NOLF) supporting Naval Air Station Pensacola and NAS Whiting Field.

In 1979, Saufley Field was redesignated as both NOLF Saufley Field and Naval Education and Training Program Development Center (NAVEDTRAPRODEVCEN) Saufley Field following the latter activity's relocation from the nearby NETPDC Ellyson Field (the former Naval Air Station Ellyson Field), Florida that was slated for closure. With NETPDC's relocation, the non-aviation portion of the installation was renamed NETPDC Saufley Field. In 1987, NETPDC was rendesignated as the Naval Education and Training Program Management Support Activity (NETPMSA). In 1996, NETPMSA was redesignated as the Naval Education and Training Professional Development and Technology Center (NETPDTC), a major shore command. In 2016, the command dropped the "technology" portion from its title due to organizational realignments within the Naval Education and Training Command (NETC) and became the Naval Education and Training Professional Development Center (NETPDC).

As the host command for Saufley Field, NETPDC supports 10 major DoD and Navy tenant commands and has a total base population in excess of 1,000 personnel.

Among the tenant commands represented at NETPDC Saufley Field are the Defense Activity for Non-Traditional Education Support (DANTES) and Navy Operational Support Center Pensacola. NOSC Pensacola, previously known as Naval Reserve Center Pensacola, supports several colocated Navy Reserve surface and shore-based support units, as well as providing Reserve-specific administrative support for Reserve Component Naval Aviator flight instructors, Naval Flight Officer flight instructors and other selected reserve and full-time support reserve component personnel physically assigned to Training Air Wing Five at NAS Whiting Field and Training Air Wing Six at NAS Pensacola.

In its concurrent role as NOLF Saufley Field, the installation currently has two inactive uncontrolled 4000 foot runways. The installation also has a permanent structural fire/rescue contingent and the capability to support an aircraft crash/fire/rescue detachment from the NAS Pensacola Fire Department, as well as in excess of 34,425 square feet (3,198.2 m^{2}) of hangar space to support training aircraft. NOLF Saufley Field and has frequently functioned as a temporary home base for turboprop and helicopter training aircraft when airfield construction projects at the local naval air stations has necessitated temporary relocation of flight operations. The Saufley VOR is also located on the installation in the center of the airfield proper.

In 1988, Federal Prison Camp Pensacola was established at Saufley Field by the Federal Bureau of Prisons to provide minimum security inmate manpower to various components of the Pensacola Naval Complex. The agreement between the Bureau of Prisons and the U.S. Navy is similar to existing ones with the U.S. Air Force in the establishment of minimum security Federal Prison Camps at Maxwell Air Force Base, Alabama and Eglin Air Force Base, Florida. Saufley Field's prison camp has a fluctuating population, but can house up to 600 inmates, with over half always dedicated to provide non-sensitive labor manpower to the maintenance of Navy installations in the area. Inmate labor is primarily used statutorily for ground maintenance and for other Morale, Welfare and Recreation (MWR) programs. The prison camp has a staff of about 85 personnel.

In September 2004, the Department of Defense and the Federal Emergency Management Agency designated Saufley Field as a temporary logistical staging area for federal, state and non-governmental agencies in response to Hurricane Ivan, considered one of the worst storms ever to hit the United States until that point. Unfortunately, a closed section of the Saufley Field airfield was also utilized for the Saufley Construction and Demolition Landfill. After Hurricane Ivan, debris disposal in this landfill was grossly mismanaged, resulting in potentially harmful gas emissions, a serious fire hazard, potential groundwater contamination and an air traffic hazard (e.g., increased bird strike/wildlife strike hazard) were created. The private owner of the facility operating it on behalf of the Federal government declared bankruptcy, thus creating a threat to public and private property and compromising Student Naval Aviator training. Closure and mitigation of the landfill was slated to be completed by 2013.

With the retirement of the T-34C Turbomentor from the Naval Air Training Command and its replacement with the T-6 Texan II, the NOLF Saufley Field portion of NETPDC Saufley Field was no longer tenable for solo flight operations by Student Naval Aviators from Training Air Wing FIVE (TRAWING 5) at NAS Whiting Field. As NAS Saufley Field in the 1960s and 1970s, the airfield contained four operational runways with lengths ranging from Runway 18/36 (later Runway 1/19) at 5,200 feet to Runway 4/22 (later Runway 5/23) at 6,035 feet. By 2002, only Runways 5/23 and 14/32 remained operational for fixed-wing aircraft and their usable lengths had been reduced to 4,000 feet. As opposed to the T-34C, the T-6 requires a minimum runway length of 4,000 feet for dual instructor/student operations and 5,000 feet for safe solo student operations under normal dry conditions. In addition, the propeller on the T-6 trainer cannot be reversed to slow the aircraft upon landing and the braking system/tires are not designed for short field landings.

In 2016, Gulf Power Company leased a majority of the airfield and began installation of a 366-acre, 50 megawatt solar farm, which was completed in August 2017.
