= Bellview, Florida =

- Census-designated place
- Location in Escambia County and the state of Florida
- Coordinates: 30°27′43″N 87°18′43″W
- Country: United States
- State: Florida
- County: Escambia

Area
  - Total: 11.78 sq mi (30.50 km^{2})
  - Land: 11.65 sq mi (30.17 km^{2})
  - Water: 0.13 sq mi (0.33 km^{2})
- Elevation: 75 ft (23 m)

Population (2020)
  - Total: 25,541
  - Density: 2,192.9/sq mi (846.69/km^{2})
- Time zone: UTC-6 (Central (CST))
  - Summer (DST): UTC-5 (CDT)
- ZIP code: 32526
- Area code: 850
- FIPS code: 12-05462
- GNIS feature ID: 2402680

Bellview is a census-designated place (CDP) in Escambia County, Florida, United States. It is considered to be a community within Pensacola. The population was 25,541 at the 2020 census, up from 23,355 at the 2010 census. It is part of the Pensacola–Ferry Pass–Brent, Florida Metropolitan Statistical Area.

== Geography ==
Bellview is located 7 miles (11 km) northwest of downtown Pensacola. U.S. Route 90, the Mobile Highway, is the main route through the CDP.

According to the United States Census Bureau, the CDP has a total area of 11.8 square miles (30.5 km^{2}), of which 11.7 square miles (30.2 km^{2}) is land and 0.15 square miles (0.4 km^{2}), or 1.16%, is water.

== Demographics ==
Historical population
Census	Pop.	Note	%±
1990	19,386		—
2000	21,201		9.4%
2010	23,355		10.2%
2020	25,541		9.4%
U.S. Decennial Census

=== 2020 census ===
As of the 2020 census, Bellview had a population of 25,541. The median age was 39.3 years. 22.0% of residents were under the age of 18 and 17.4% of residents were 65 years of age or older. For every 100 females there were 91.0 males, and for every 100 females age 18 and over there were 87.7 males age 18 and over.

100.0% of residents lived in urban areas, while 0.0% lived in rural areas.

There were 10,380 households in Bellview, of which 28.9% had children under the age of 18 living in them. Of all households, 40.9% were married-couple households, 18.7% were households with a male householder and no spouse or partner present, and 32.6% were households with a female householder and no spouse or partner present. About 26.7% of all households were made up of individuals and 10.5% had someone living alone who was 65 years of age or older.

There were 11,117 housing units, of which 6.6% were vacant. The homeowner vacancy rate was 1.7% and the rental vacancy rate was 8.1%.

Racial composition as of the 2020 census
Race	Number	Percent
White	15,347	60.1%
Black or African American	5,762	22.6%
American Indian and Alaska Native	211	0.8%
Asian	1,197	4.7%
Native Hawaiian and Other Pacific Islander	55	0.2%
Some other race	632	2.5%
Two or more races	2,337	9.1%
Hispanic or Latino (of any race)	1,644	6.4%

=== 2000 census ===
As of the 2000 census, there were 21,201 people, 8,108 households, and 5,951 families residing in the CDP. The population density was 1,793.3 inhabitants per square mile (692.4/km^{2}). There were 8,673 housing units at an average density of 733.6 per square mile (283.2/km^{2}). The racial makeup of the CDP was 80.66% White, 11.69% African American, 1.08% Native American, 3.28% Asian, 0.16% Pacific Islander, 0.67% from other races, and 2.46% from two or more races. Hispanic or Latino of any race were 2.40% of the population.

There were 8,108 households, out of which 34.3% had children under the age of 18 living with them, 54.4% were married couples living together, 14.8% had a female householder with no husband present, and 26.6% were non-families. 21.4% of all households were made up of individuals, and 7.4% had someone living alone who was 65 years of age or older. The average household size was 2.61 and the average family size was 3.02.

In the CDP, the population was spread out, with 26.5% under the age of 18, 8.8% from 18 to 24, 29.1% from 25 to 44, 25.2% from 45 to 64, and 10.4% who were 65 years of age or older. The median age was 36 years. For every 100 females, there were 91.8 males. For every 100 females age 18 and over, there were 87.8 males.

The median income for a household in the CDP was $38,725, and the median income for a family was $44,693. Males had a median income of $31,160 versus $21,613 for females. The per capita income for the CDP was $18,173. About 7.6% of families and 10.2% of the population were below the poverty line, including 14.1% of those under age 18 and 9.3% of those age 65 or over.
