= Walnut Hill, Florida =

- Unincorporated community
- Location within Florida
- Coordinates: 30°53′08″N 87°30′36″W
- Country: United States
- State: Florida
- County: Escambia
- Elevation: 259 ft (79 m)
- Time zone: UTC-6 (Central (CST))
  - Summer (DST): UTC-5 (CDT)
- Postal code: 32568
- Area code: 850
- GNIS feature ID: 292850

Walnut Hill is an unincorporated community in Escambia County, Florida, United States, located 16 miles (26 km) west-southwest of Century.
