= Molino, Florida =

- Census-designated place
- Location in Escambia County and the state of Florida
- Coordinates: 30°42′44″N 87°19′26″W
- Country: United States
- State: Florida
- County: Escambia

Area
  - Total: 7.05 sq mi (18.25 km^{2})
  - Land: 6.96 sq mi (18.02 km^{2})
  - Water: 0.089 sq mi (0.23 km^{2})
- Elevation: 112 ft (34 m)

Population (2020)
  - Total: 1,296
  - Density: 186.3/sq mi (71.93/km^{2})
- Time zone: UTC-6 (Central (CST))
  - Summer (DST): UTC-5 (CDT)
- ZIP code: 32577
- Area code: 850
- FIPS code: 12-46225
- GNIS feature ID: 2403299

Molino is a census-designated place (CDP) in Escambia County, Florida, United States. The population was 1,296 at the 2020 census, up from 1,277 at the 2010 census. It is part of the Pensacola–Ferry Pass–Brent, Florida Metropolitan Statistical Area.

== Geography ==
According to the United States Census Bureau, the CDP has a total area of 7.1 square miles (18.3 km^{2}), of which 6.9 square miles (18.0 km^{2}) is land and 0.077 square miles (0.2 km^{2}), or 1.29%, is water.

== Demographics ==
Historical population
| Census | Pop. | Note | %± |
|---|---|---|---|
| 1990 | 1,207 | | — |
| 2000 | 1,312 | | 8.7% |
| 2010 | 1,277 | | −2.7% |
| 2020 | 1,296 | | 1.5% |
U.S. Decennial Census

=== 2020 census ===
As of the 2020 census, Molino had a population of 1,296. The median age was 40.9 years. 24.7% of residents were under the age of 18 and 16.2% of residents were 65 years of age or older. For every 100 females there were 107.4 males, and for every 100 females age 18 and over there were 107.2 males age 18 and over.

0.0% of residents lived in urban areas, while 100.0% lived in rural areas.

There were 465 households in Molino, of which 29.5% had children under the age of 18 living in them. Of all households, 49.7% were married-couple households, 22.2% were households with a male householder and no spouse or partner present, and 24.5% were households with a female householder and no spouse or partner present. About 25.6% of all households were made up of individuals and 15.0% had someone living alone who was 65 years of age or older.

There were 529 housing units, of which 12.1% were vacant. The homeowner vacancy rate was 2.7% and the rental vacancy rate was 5.9%.

Racial composition as of the 2020 census
| Race | Number | Percent |
|---|---|---|
| White | 933 | 72.0% |
| Black or African American | 234 | 18.1% |
| American Indian and Alaska Native | 7 | 0.5% |
| Asian | 7 | 0.5% |
| Native Hawaiian and Other Pacific Islander | 0 | 0.0% |
| Some other race | 17 | 1.3% |
| Two or more races | 98 | 7.6% |
| Hispanic or Latino (of any race) | 40 | 3.1% |

=== 2000 census ===
As of the 2000 census, there were 1,312 people, 468 households, and 356 families residing in the CDP. The population density was 188.3 inhabitants per square mile (72.7/km^{2}). There were 504 housing units at an average density of 72.3 per square mile (27.9/km^{2}). The racial makeup of the CDP was 71.42% White, 24.70% African American, 0.61% Native American, 0.30% Asian, 0.38% from other races, and 2.59% from two or more races. Hispanic or Latino of any race were 0.84% of the population.

Of the 468 households, 38.0% had children under the age of 18 living with them, 57.9% were married couples living together, 13.7% had a female householder with no husband present, and 23.9% were non-families. 21.4% of all households were made up of individuals, and 10.9% had someone living alone who was 65 years of age or older. The average household size was 2.80 and the average family size was 3.26.

In the CDP, the population was spread out, with 30.2% under the age of 18, 6.9% from 18 to 24, 29.1% from 25 to 44, 21.6% from 45 to 64, and 12.2% who were 65 years of age or older. The median age was 35 years. For every 100 females, there were 105.0 males. For every 100 females age 18 and over, there were 94.1 males.

The median income for a household in the CDP was $31,793, and the median income for a family was $38,889. Males had a median income of $40,550 versus $21,438 for females. The per capita income for the CDP was $14,334. About 10.7% of families and 12.7% of the population were below the poverty line, including 19.1% of those under age 18 and 10.5% of those age 65 or over.

== Notable people ==
- Joe Durant, professional golfer
- Charles Rouse, state legislator and county commissioner
- Don Sutton, former Major League Baseball pitcher, grew up in Molino
