= Cantonment, Florida =

- Unincorporated community
- Location within Florida Location within the United States
- Coordinates: 30°36′30.7″N 87°20′23.91″W
- Country: United States
- State: Florida
- County: Escambia
- Elevation: 148 ft (45 m)
- Time zone: UTC-6 (CST)
  - Summer (DST): UTC-5 (CDT)
- ZIP Code: 32533
- Area code: 850
- FIPS code: 12-10225
- GNIS ID: 279994

Cantonment is an unincorporated community in Escambia County, Florida, United States. It is located north of Pensacola, south of Molino, and centered around Highway 29, and extends to the Perdido River to the west, and the Escambia River to the east.

== History ==
In 1814 Andrew Jackson camped his troops in what is now the Cantonment area. This is also how the town received its name, as a cantonment is a temporary quarter for troops.

Over the years, however, the pronunciation of the town's name has changed to differ from the pronunciation of the word cantonment. Locals generally refer to the community as "can-tone-ment."

== Geography ==
Cantonment is located in Escambia County, in the western Panhandle of Florida. It comprises the entirety of the 32533 ZIP code.

It is bordered by Pensacola to the south, and Molino to the north. Its southern border generally considered to be Ten Mile Road, its northern border generally considered to be Barrineau Park Road. Cantonment is surrounded to the west and east by the Perdido River and Escambia River respectively.

== Demographics ==
Cantonment is located within the Pensacola Metropolitan Statistical Area.

== Notable people ==
- Jay Bell, Major League Baseball Shortstop
- Steve Campbell, college and high school football coach
- Travis Fryman, Major League Baseball Shortstop, Third Base, Manager
- Graham Gano, National Football League kicker
- Derek and Alex King, American murderers
- Loucheiz Purifoy, current Canadian Football League and former National Football League cornerback
- Fred Robbins, National Football League defensive lineman
- Don Sutton, Major League Baseball Pitcher
