= Brent, Florida =

- Census-designated place
- Location in Escambia County and the state of Florida
- Coordinates: 30°29′14″N 87°14′57″W
- Country: United States
- State: Florida
- County: Escambia

Area
  - Total: 10.39 sq mi (26.91 km^{2})
  - Land: 10.23 sq mi (26.49 km^{2})
  - Water: 0.17 sq mi (0.43 km^{2})
- Elevation: 105 ft (32 m)

Population (2020)
  - Total: 23,447
  - Density: 2,292.7/sq mi (885.23/km^{2})
- Time zone: UTC-6 (Central (CST))
  - Summer (DST): UTC-5 (CDT)
- ZIP code: 32503
- Area code: 850
- FIPS code: 12-08300
- GNIS feature ID: 2402713

Brent is a census-designated place (CDP) in Escambia County, Florida, United States. It is considered to be a community within Pensacola. The population was 23,447 at the 2020 census, up from 21,804 at the 2010 census. It is a principal area of the Pensacola-Ferry Pass-Brent, Florida Metropolitan Statistical Area. The community is named after Francis Celestino Brent, who played an integral role in the development of Pensacola.

== Geography ==
Brent is located 3 miles (5 km) northwest of Pensacola. The elevation is 112 feet (34 m) above sea level.

According to the United States Census Bureau, the CDP has a total area of 10.5 square miles (27.3 km^{2}), of which 10.4 square miles (26.9 km^{2}) is land and 0.15 square miles (0.4 km^{2}), or 1.58%, is water.

The boundaries of the CDP include Fairfield Drive to the south, the city of Pensacola to the east, Interstate 10 (Ensley) to the north, and Bellview to the west.

== Demographics ==
Historical population
Census	Pop.	Note	%±
1980	21,872		—
1990	21,624		−1.1%
2000	22,257		2.9%
2010	21,804		−2.0%
2020	23,447		7.5%

=== 2020 census ===
As of the 2020 census, Brent had a population of 23,447. The median age was 28.0 years. 21.8% of residents were under the age of 18 and 12.8% of residents were 65 years of age or older. For every 100 females there were 89.1 males, and for every 100 females age 18 and over there were 85.3 males age 18 and over.

100.0% of residents lived in urban areas, while 0.0% lived in rural areas.

There were 7,477 households in Brent, of which 30.7% had children under the age of 18 living in them. Of all households, 31.1% were married-couple households, 20.8% were households with a male householder and no spouse or partner present, and 40.4% were households with a female householder and no spouse or partner present. About 30.9% of all households were made up of individuals and 12.7% had someone living alone who was 65 years of age or older.

There were 8,521 housing units, of which 12.3% were vacant. The homeowner vacancy rate was 1.9% and the rental vacancy rate was 13.1%.

Racial composition as of the 2020 census
Race	Number	Percent
White	10,956	46.7%
Black or African American	8,804	37.5%
American Indian and Alaska Native	136	0.6%
Asian	1,034	4.4%
Native Hawaiian and Other Pacific Islander	50	0.2%
Some other race	933	4.0%
Two or more races	1,534	6.5%
Hispanic or Latino (of any race)	1,634	7.0%

=== 2000 census ===
As of the census of 2000, there were 22,257 people, 7,008 households, and 4,800 families residing in the CDP. The population density was 2,132.4 inhabitants per square mile (823.3/km^{2}). There were 7,796 housing units at an average density of 746.9 per square mile (288.4/km^{2}). The racial makeup of the CDP was 32.25% White, 59.87% African American, 0.74% Native American, 2.28% Asian, 0.27% Pacific Islander, 0.47% from other races, and 2.13% from two or more races. Hispanic or Latino of any race were 1.95% of the population.

There were 7,008 households, out of which 32.9% had children under the age of 18 living with them, 41.7% were married couples living together, 22.1% had a female householder with no husband present, and 31.5% were non-families. 25.3% of all households were made up of individuals, and 8.7% had someone living alone who was 65 years of age or older. The average household size was 2.60 and the average family size was 3.12.

In the CDP, the population was spread out, with 23.8% under the age of 18, 24.1% from 18 to 24, 23.4% from 25 to 44, 17.2% from 45 to 64, and 11.4% who were 65 years of age or older. The median age was 27 years. For every 100 males, there were 84.1 females. For every 100 males age 18 and over, there were 78.9 females.

The median income for a household in the CDP was $27,488, and the median income for a family was $31,250. Males had a median income of $26,390 versus $18,637 for females. The per capita income for the CDP was $11,774. About 20.5% of families and 24.5% of the population were below the poverty line, including 37.9% of those under age 18 and 12.8% of those age 65 or over.

== Education ==
Brent is part of the Escambia County School District, which also serves the entire county.

== See also ==
- Brownsville-Brent-Goulding, Florida, a single census area recorded during the 1950 Census
