= Chevalier Field =

Naval Air Station Chevalier Field
- Pensacola, Florida in United States of America
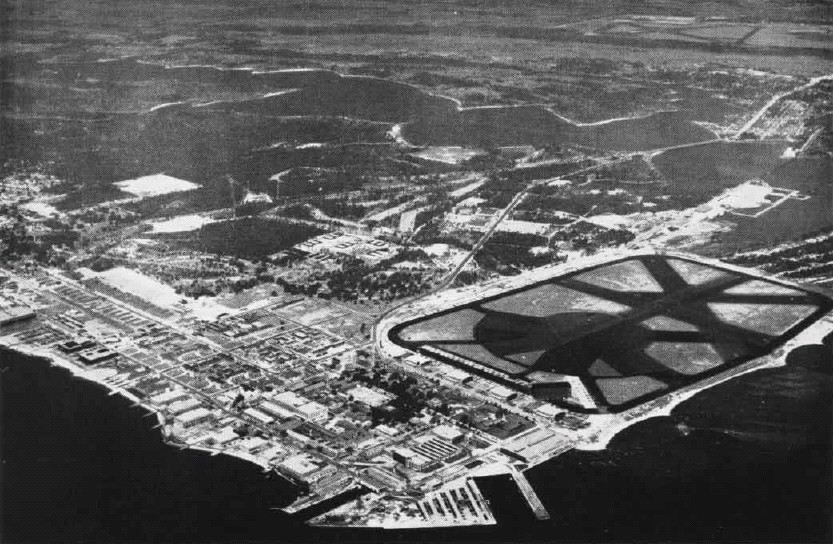
- Aerial view of NAS Pensacola in the mid-1940s. Chevalier Field is at the right.

Site information
- Type: Defunct
- Owner: US Government
- Operator: United States Navy
- Condition: Demolished

Location
- Location in Florida NAS Chevalier (the United States)
- Coordinates: 30°33′53″N 87°48′32″W

Site history
- Built: 1922
- Built for: Navy aircraft maintenance
- In use: 1922 - 1976
- Fate: Closed

Chevalier Field was the original non-seaplane aircraft landing area at Naval Air Station Pensacola, Florida. Chevalier Field was originally established in 1922, as an expansion of a ballon field. It was later upgraded to accommodate Navy aircraft, and was expanded significantly by World War II. However, the introduction of jet aircraft became an issue due to the airport's limited capacity, leading to its closure in 1976.

== History ==
Established originally in 1922 as Station Field, it was an expansion of the balloon operating field that opened in 1916. It was located on the northeast side of the Navy shipyard, on the western edge of Pensacola Bay and south of Bayou Grande. The small town of Woolsey, just north of the Navy Yard, had been razed for the creation of the airdrome. "Locals assumed the Army's involvement in the project and had to be informed that the field, initially called Station Field, was intended for the exclusive use of Navy landplanes."

Expanded in 1935, it was renamed Chevalier Field after United States Naval Aviation pioneer Godfrey de Courcelles Chevalier. A graduate of the U.S. Naval Academy in June 1910, who was appointed Naval Air Pilot No. 7 on 7 November 1915 and a Naval Aviator No. 7 on 7 November 1918. Chevalier commanded the first naval air station in France, at Dunkerque, in November 1917, and for his World War I service was awarded the Navy Distinguished Service Medal. On 26 October 1922 Lieutenant Commander Chevalier made the first landing on the USS Langley's deck, the U.S. Navy's first aircraft carrier, in an Aeromarine 39-B, A-606. Chevalier died at Norfolk Naval Air Station after a crash.

A blimp hangar and two aircraft hangars had been constructed on the south side of the field by 1935, and the field was further expanded in 1938, adding schools for aviation medicine and aviation maintenance.

=== 1939 - 1976 ===
By World War II, the field had seven asphalt runways arranged in two clusters that intersected in mid-field, the longest 3,100 feet. Seaplane hangars had been added on the southeast corner facing Pensacola Bay by this time.

With the introduction of jet aircraft, Chevalier's limited runway length and ramp space became a problem, and on 2 November 1951, Forrest Sherman Field was dedicated, three miles to the west, which remains the primary air facility at NAS Pensacola, as well as the home of the Blue Angels demonstration team. Chevalier Field remained in limited use as a helicopter facility and its perimeter was used as a storage area for aircraft awaiting refurbishment by the Naval Air Rework Facility (NARF), later renamed the Naval Aviation Depot (NADEP) located at the base into the 1980s and early 1990s. A rail spur onto the base was aligned along the western edge of the airfield until it was removed circa 1979. This line was originally the Pensacola and Fort Barrancas Railroad, dating from 1870, an eight-mile line connecting Pensacola with Fort Barrancas through Warrington and Woolsey.

Helicopter operations ended in the period 1994–1996, coinciding with the Base Realignment and Closure (BRAC)-directed closure of NADEP Pensacola, although the airfield itself was closed as an independent air facility by 1976.

=== Present ===
In the late 1990s, with the BRAC-directed relocation of the Naval Air Technical Training Center (NATTC) from NAS Memphis, the airfield was completely removed and the more modern buildings of the former NADEP repurposed as a new complex of buildings and barracks for the relocating NATTC was erected on the site. Several hangar buildings, including the original control tower, still exist and have been adapted for reuse as part of the NATTC facility.
