= USS Chevalier =

Two ships of the United States Navy have borne the name Chevalier, in honor of the Lieutenant Commander Godfrey Chevalier, a pioneer of naval aviation.

- USS Chevalier (DD-451), was a Fletcher-class destroyer, launched in 1942 and sunk in 1943.
- USS Chevalier (DD-805), was a Gearing-class destroyer, launched in 1944 and struck in 1975. Chevalier was transferred to South Korea in 1972, and renamed Chung Buk; she was scrapped in 2000.
