= Woolsey, Florida =

Former community in Florida, U.S.

Coordinates: 30.3569°N 87.2678°W

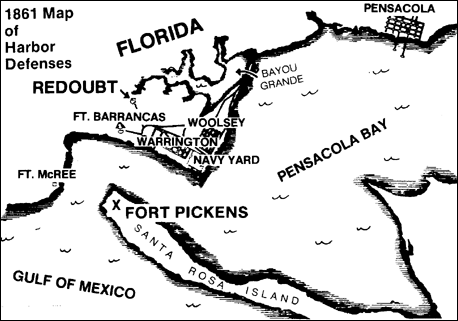
Sketch showing 1861 harbor defenses at entrance to Pensacola Bay. The town of Warrington (shown east of Fort Barrancas) was relocated north of Bayou Grande in the 1930s to provide land for Naval Air Station Pensacola.

Woolsey, Florida, was a small community located on the north side of the Pensacola Navy Yard, the construction of which began in Northwest Florida in April 1826. The town was razed in 1922 to make way for expanded Navy facilities.

== History ==
=== Creation ===
Recognizing the advantages of the Pensacola harbor and the large timber reserves nearby for shipbuilding, in 1825 President John Quincy Adams and Secretary of the Navy Samuel Southard made arrangements to build a Navy Yard on the southern tip of Escambia County, where the air station is today. Navy captains William Bainbridge, Lewis Warrington, and James Biddle selected the site on Pensacola Bay. Commodore Warrington served as the first commandant of the navy yard. Warrington was succeeded by Commodore Melancthon Taylor Woolsey in late 1827, which position he held until 1831.

"Commodore Woolsey created two villages, Warrington and Woolsey, outside the navy yard for homebuilding."

=== Railroad ===
The Pensacola and Fort Barrancas Railroad, an eight-mile line connecting Pensacola with Fort Barrancas through Warrington, and Woolsey, was begun from 1870. The company was incorporated by a special act of the State of Florida on February 12, 1870. It was granted an easement by Congress to run through the federal Navy Yard reservation on January 30, 1871.

=== Elimination ===
Following World War I, operation of land-based aircraft at Naval Air Station Pensacola increased. An expansion of the balloon operating field that opened immediately north of the old Navy Yard boundary in 1916 was undertaken in 1922. To make room for the enlarged facility, the small town of Woolsey was razed for the creation of the airdrome. "Locals assumed the Army's involvement in the project and had to be informed that the field, initially called Station Field, was intended for the exclusive use of Navy landplanes." The facility was renamed Chevalier Field in 1935.

No trace remains of Woolsey.
