= Naval Air Station Ellyson Field =

Coordinates: 30.52770°N 87.19753°W

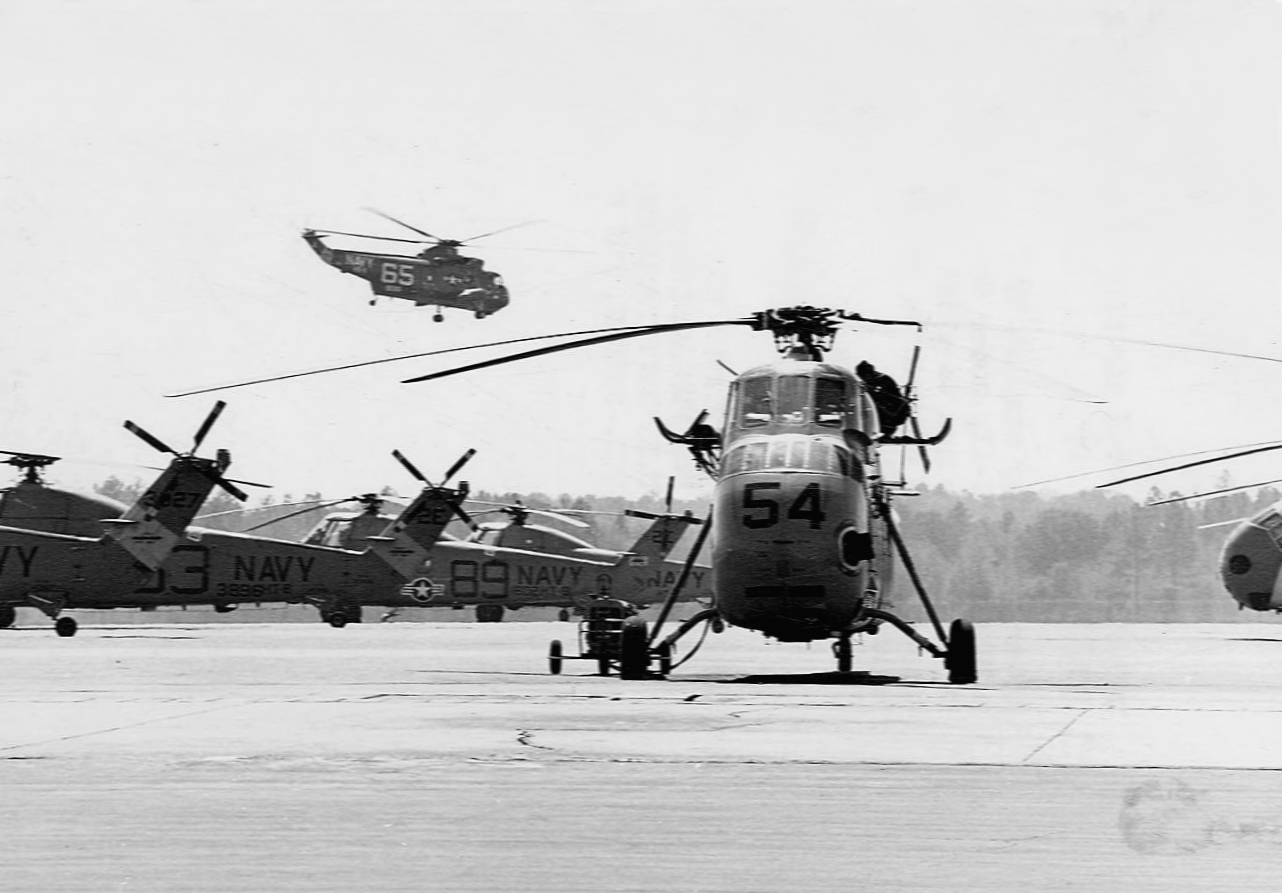
- IATA: NDP (now retired); ICAO: none

Summary
- Opened: 1940
- Closed: Airfield 1973; facility 1979
- Interactive map of Naval Air Station Ellyson Field

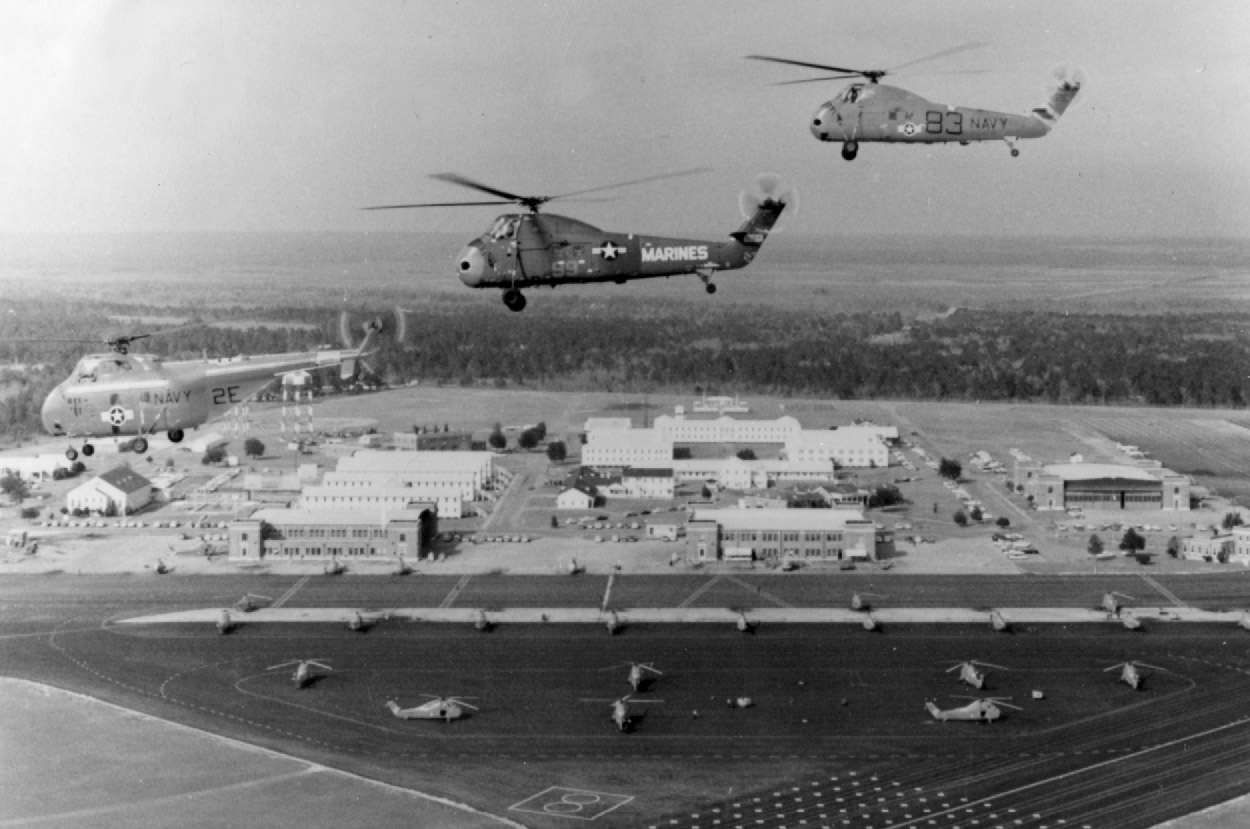
H-19 and H-34 helicopters of HT-8 over NAS Ellyson Field in 1967.

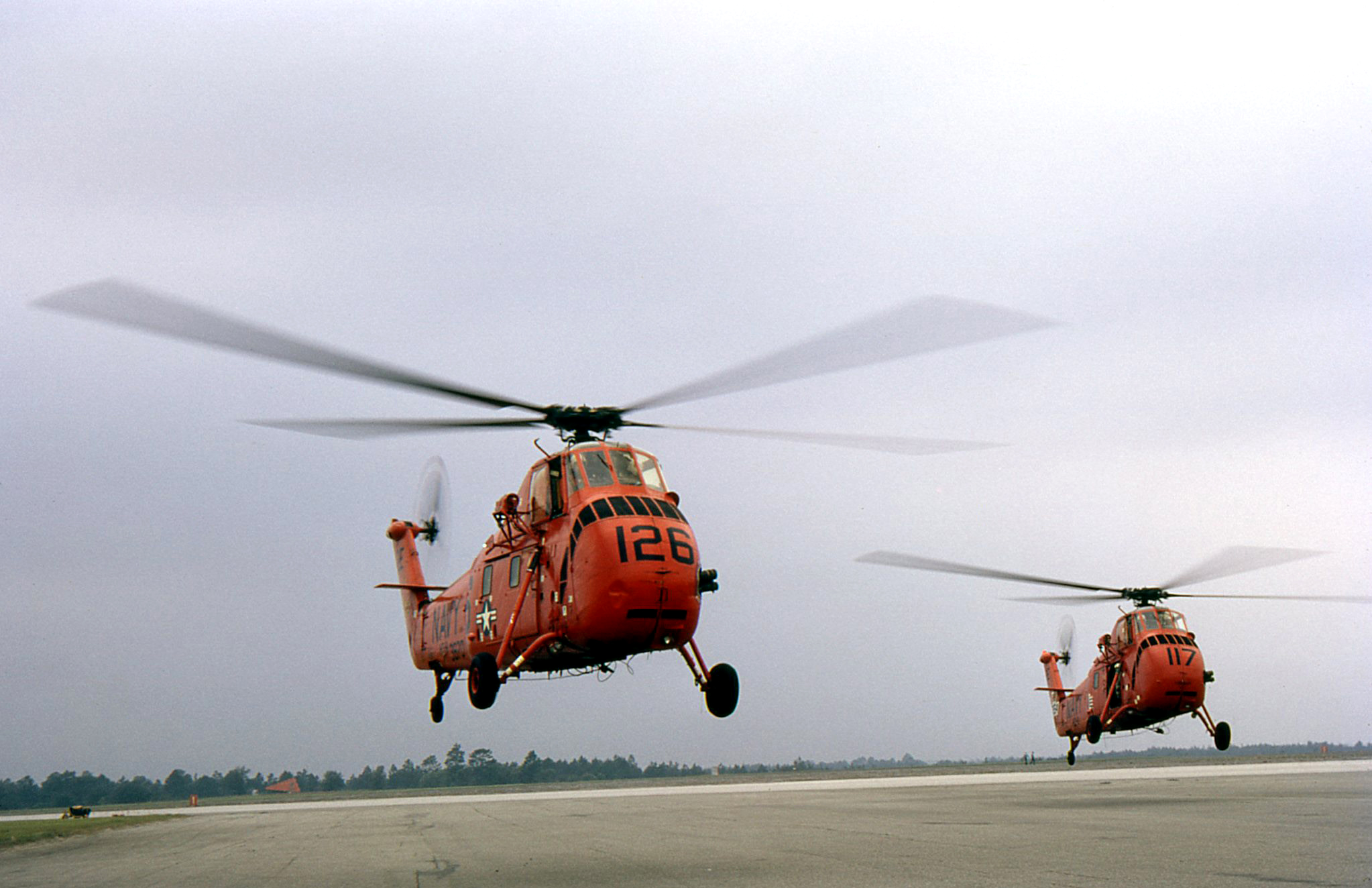
UH-34Gs airborne at NAS Ellyson Field c.(Dec'67-Jan'68)

Naval Air Station Ellyson Field (NDP) was a former U.S. Navy training base, established in Escambia County, Florida in 1940 at the outset of World War II as an auxiliary facility to Chevalier Field at Naval Air Station Pensacola, Florida. It had three red brick hangars common to the various Navy airfields in the Pensacola area, and eight paved runways, the longest of which was 3,550 ft in length.

The short length of the air station's runways became increasingly incompatible with the introduction of higher performance piston aircraft followed by first generation jet aircraft in the post-World War II era. Fixed-wing operations were subsequently by exception until approximately late 1970 and limited to only a few certain models of propeller-driven training aircraft (e.g., T-34, T-28, etc.). However, rotary-wing operations at the air station continued to flourish as helicopters saw ever-increasing use in the U.S. Navy, the U.S. Marine Corps and the U.S. Coast Guard in the 1950s and 1960s, with NAS Ellyson Field becoming the sole intermediate and advanced training site for rotary-wing Naval Aviators in each of those services.

NAS Ellyson Field last served the Navy as a helicopter training facility through December 1973, by which time conflicts with air traffic patterns for general aviation and commercial passenger jet traffic at Pensacola Regional Airport / Hagler Field, now known as Pensacola International Airport, located just south of the station, coupled with the reorganization of Naval Air Training Command, led to a decision to close the airfield but retain the installation for non-flying operations. Helicopter training was moved to NAS Whiting Field, Florida, and flight operations were discontinued on 28 December 1973.

The base was taken over by the Naval Education and Training Program Development Center (NETPDC), which renamed the installation as NETPDC Ellyson Field. Following NETPDC's move to the former NAS Saufley Field, Florida, in 1979, Ellyson Field was closed.

Conveyed to the City of Pensacola, the former NAS Ellyson Field is now the Ellyson Industrial Park with only a few of the former Navy buildings still standing. These include the base operations building (minus its control tower cab), the three hangars, the academic training building, the dispensary and the Bachelor Officers Quarters (BOQ) that served the Navy, Marine Corps, Coast Guard and NATO/Allied officer flight student personnel assigned to NAS Ellyson Field for rotary-wing training. Portions of the ramp areas also still exist but the runway grid has been completely redeveloped.
