= Pensacola Naval Air Station Historic District =

Historic district in Florida, United States

- U.S. National Register of Historic Places
- U.S. National Historic Landmark District
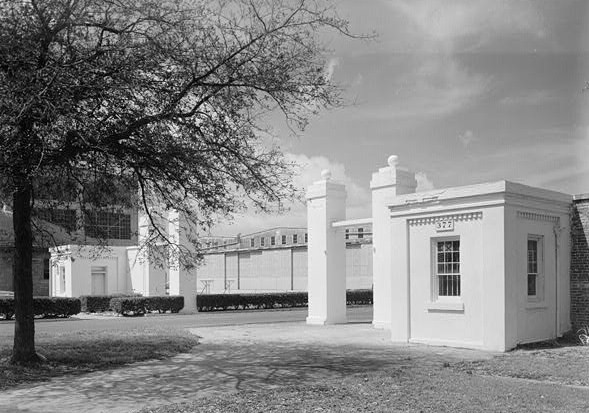
- Gatehouses and Gates

- Location within Florida Location within the United States
- Location: Warrington, Florida
- Nearest city: Pensacola
- Coordinates: 30°20′52″N 87°17′50″W
- Area: 82 acres (33 ha)
- Built: 1824-1899, 1914
- NRHP reference No.: 76000595

Significant dates
- Added to NRHP: December 8, 1976
- Designated NHLD: December 8, 1976

The Pensacola Naval Air Station Historic District encompasses the early historic elements of Naval Air Station Pensacola in Warrington, Florida. Included in the historic district are surviving buildings of the Pensacola Navy Yard, which the air station took over, as well as buildings related to the early years of aviator training by the United States Navy. The district, roughly bounded by West Street, Saufley Avenue, and Pensacola Bay, was designated a U.S. National Historic Landmark District in 1976.

== Description and history ==
The Pensacola Naval Air Station Historic District is located at the southeastern corner of the modern Naval Air Station Pensacola. It covers 82 acres (33 ha), roughly including the formerly walled portion of the Pensacola Navy Yard. The district includes buildings dating to the post-Civil War period of the navy yard, as well as early structures related to the training of naval aviators on seaplanes. The original navy yard commander's house is in the district, as are residential barracks, an 1865 chapel, and a variety of service buildings that have seen different uses throughout their history. When listed as a National Historic Landmark, there were 55 buildings in all.

Pensacola Navy Yard was established in the 1820s, not long after Florida became a territory of the United States. Most of its facilities were destroyed in 1862 by Confederate forces in the American Civil War, but Union forces soon began to rebuild it. The yard suffered major damage during a hurricane in 1906, after which there was another major building program. In 1913, Pensacola was chosen as the site of the Navy's formal training program for sea-based aviators, resulting in the construction of facilities specific to that use. Most significant among these are a series of seaplane hangars, located along the southernmost shore of the facility.

== See also ==
- List of National Historic Landmarks in Florida
- National Register of Historic Places listings in Escambia County, Florida
