= Pensacola and Fort Barrancas Railroad =

Railway in Florida

Overview
- Headquarters: Pensacola, Florida
- Locale: Florida Panhandle
- Dates of operation: February 1870–1882

Technical
- Track gauge: 4 ft 8 1/2 in (1,435 mm) standard gauge
- Length: 8 mi (13 km)

The Pensacola and Fort Barrancas Railroad was an eight-mile line connecting Pensacola, Florida, with Fort Barrancas through Warrington and Woolsey, dating to 1870. The company was incorporated by a special act of the State of Florida on February 12, 1870. It was granted an easement by Congress to run through the federal Navy Yard reservation on January 30, 1871. It was acquired by the Pensacola and Atlantic Railroad in 1882 and in 1897 the railroad, including the rolling stock and buildings was sold to a buyer from Baltimore.

The line passed through several corporate ownerships and was the rail link aboard Naval Air Station Pensacola before being abandoned circa 1979 with the bridges across several waterways removed. The trestle across Bayou Grande, immediately north of Chevalier Field on NAS Pensacola, was featured in the 1957 John Ford-directed MGM film "The Wings of Eagles" starring John Wayne, with a steam-powered freight train crossing the span during an N-9 floatplane buzz job.

There remains almost no evidence of the rail line aboard the naval air station.
