= Airman Apprenticeship Training School =

Airman Apprenticeship Training School NATTC Pensacola
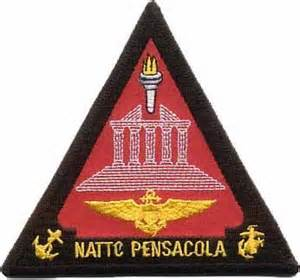
- Active: March 4, 1999: (NATTC was previously located on Naval Air Station Memphis); ATD was previously located on Recruit Training Command, Great Lakes, Illinois
- Allegiance: United States of America
- Branch: US Navy
- Role: Aviation Training
- Size: 15,000 students (NATTC)
- Garrison/HQ: NAS Pensacola
- Motto(s): Honor, Courage, Commitment
- Mascot(s): Bill the Goat
- Anniversaries: U.S. Navy's official birthday (13 October 1775)

Commanders
- Commanding Officer: Captain Thomas Decker
- Executive Officer: Commander Anthony "T-Bone" Myers
- Command Master Chief: CMDCM Rich Galvan

Naval Air Technical Training Center (NATTC) is the parent command of the Airman Apprenticeship Training School, and provides technical training schools for nearly all enlisted aircraft maintenance and enlisted aircrew specialties in the U.S. Navy, U.S. Marine Corps and U.S. Coast Guard.

== Aviation Training Department ==
After completion of recruit training, enlistees in the Airman Apprenticeship Training program (ATD) attend a three-week course on basic theory in aviation fundamental skills at Naval Air Technical Training Center (NATTC) located aboard NAS Pensacola in Pensacola, FL. After successful completion of this training, airman apprentices are usually assigned to squadrons or other aviation commands where the Navy needs them the most.

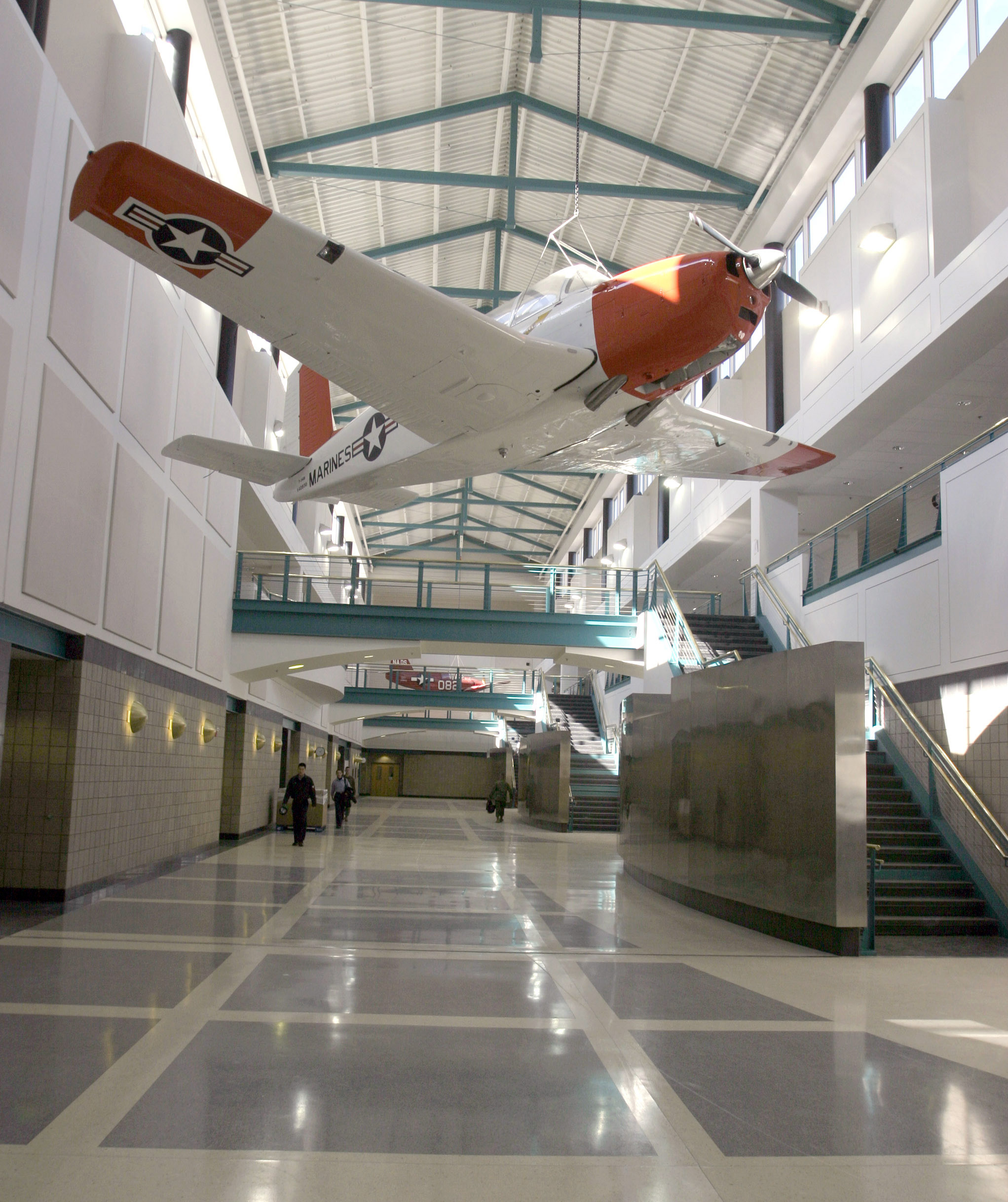
T-34B Mentor trainer aircraft hangs in the North Atrium of the newly renovated Chevalier Hall building at the Naval Air Technical Training Center (NATTC) on board Naval Air Station Pensacola, FL

The duties performed by airman apprentices include:

- repairing, maintaining and stowing aircraft and associated equipment in preparation for flight operations;
- working with qualified personnel to gain job training and experience;
- performing ground and deck duties involved in the take-off and landing of aircraft;
- standing security watches on flight lines or decks;
- doing temporary duty for 90–120 days with food services divisions;
- serving as members of crash crews and security alert teams;
- participating in naval ceremonies.

== Airman Rating and Paygrade ==
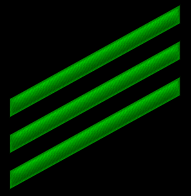
USN Seaman (E-3) insignia (airman)

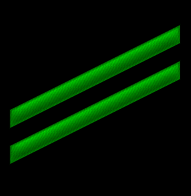
USN Seaman apprentice (E-2) insignia (airman)

In the U.S. Navy, Airman is the enlisted rank that corresponds to the pay grade of E-3 in the Navy's aviation field. Airman is just above Airman Recruit (E-1) and Airman Apprentice (E-2), and below the rank of petty officer third class, pay grade E-4.

== Pay ==
According to the 2013 Basic Enlisted Military Pay Chart, an Airman Recruit (E-1) with less than 4 months of service receives a base pay of $1403. An Airman Apprentice (E-2) with less than 2 years of service receives $1700, and an Airman (E-3) receives $1787.
