= Godfrey Chevalier =

Godfrey de Courcelles Chevalier
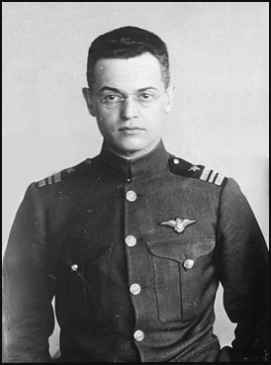
- Born: March 7, 1889; Providence, Rhode Island
- Died: November 14, 1922 (aged 33); Norfolk, Virginia
- Military career
- Allegiance: United States of America
- Branch: United States Navy
- Service years: 1907-1922
- Rank: Lieutenant Commander
- Commands: Naval Air Station Dunkerque, France
- Conflicts: World War I: Western Front (World War I)
- Awards: Distinguished Service Medal; Croix de Guerre

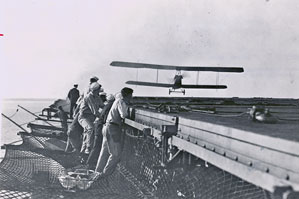
An Aeromarine 39B piloted by Chevalier is seen just before it touches down on the flight deck of USS Langley (CV-1) on 26 October 1922 – the first landing aboard an American aircraft carrier.

Lieutenant Commander Godfrey de Courcelles Chevalier, USN (7 March 1889 – 14 November 1922) was a pioneering naval aviator of the United States Navy of World War I and the early 1920s.

== Biography ==
Born in Providence, Rhode Island on 7 March 1889, Chevalier graduated from the United States Naval Academy in June 1910. He was appointed a Naval Air Pilot on 7 November 1915 and a Naval Aviator on 7 November 1918.

On 8 May 1913, ensign Chevalier was the passenger in a long-distance flight of 169 miles, flown in a Curtiss flying boat piloted by Lieutenant John Henry Towers, Naval Aviator No. 3, from the Washington Navy Yard in Washington, D.C. down the Potomac River and then up the Chesapeake Bay to the U.S. Naval Academy at Annapolis, Maryland. The flight took three hours and five minutes.

On 12 July 1916 he participated in the installation of the first real aircraft catapult used in the U.S. Navy and piloted the first plane to be launched by catapult, from the armored cruiser USS North Carolina. In November 1917 he commanded the first naval air station in France, at Dunkerque, and for World War I service was awarded the Distinguished Service Medal. On 9 March 1919 he was also awarded the Croix de Guerre.

In 1922 he was attached to USS Langley (CV-1), the first American aircraft carrier, in connection with fitting her out. On 26 October 1922 Lieutenant Commander Chevalier made the first landing on Langley's deck, flying Aeromarine 39B No. 606.

A distinguished pioneer of naval aviation, Chevalier died at the Norfolk Naval Hospital at Naval Station Norfolk in Norfolk, Virginia, on 14 November 1922 as a result of injuries sustained in the 12 November 1922 crash near Lockhaven, Virginia, of a Vought VE-7 he was flying from Naval Air Station Norfolk to Yorktown, Virginia.

== Namesake ==
Two U.S. Navy destroyers have been named USS Chevalier in his honor, as was Chevalier Field, an airfield at Naval Air Station Pensacola in Pensacola, Florida. The Chevalier Theatre in Medford, Massachusetts is also named for him.

== Awards & Decorations ==
Navy Distinguished Service Medal
World War I Victory Medal with one bronze service star

== Photo gallery ==
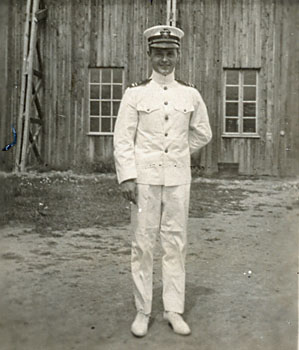
Godfrey de C. Chevalier

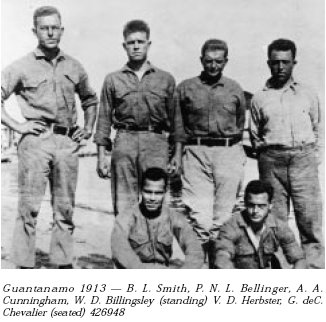
Early navy aviators; de C. Chevalier at lower right

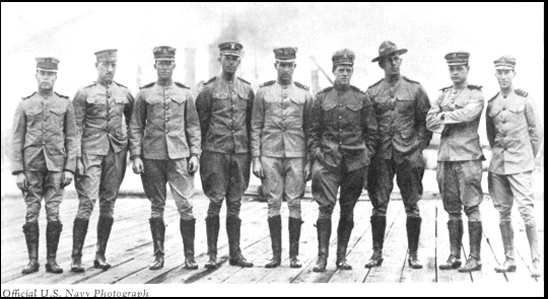
Early aviators at the Naval Aeronautic Station) in Pensacola, Florida, in 1914. Ensign Godfrey de C. Chevalier is second from right.

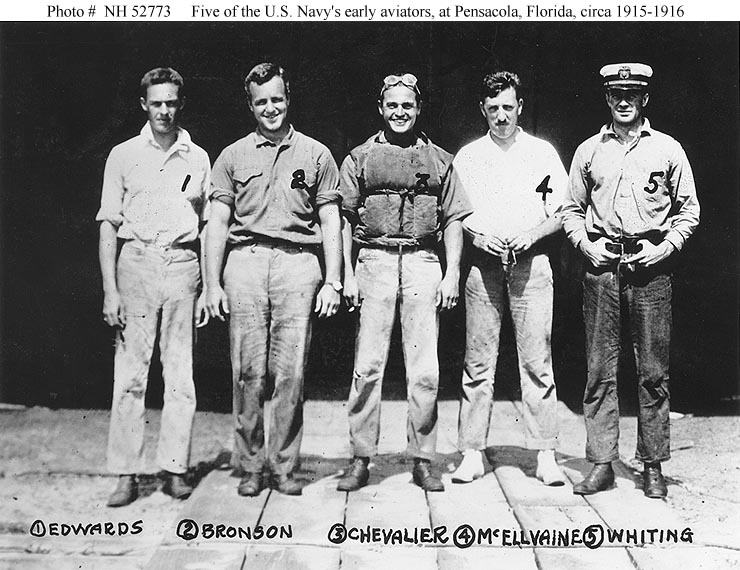

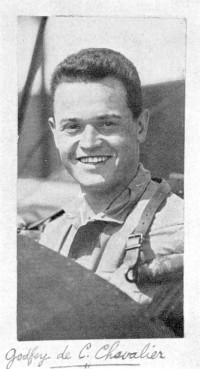
Godfrey Chevalier in the cockpit of an unidentified aircraft.
