= USS Chevalier (DD-805) =

Gearing-class destroyer

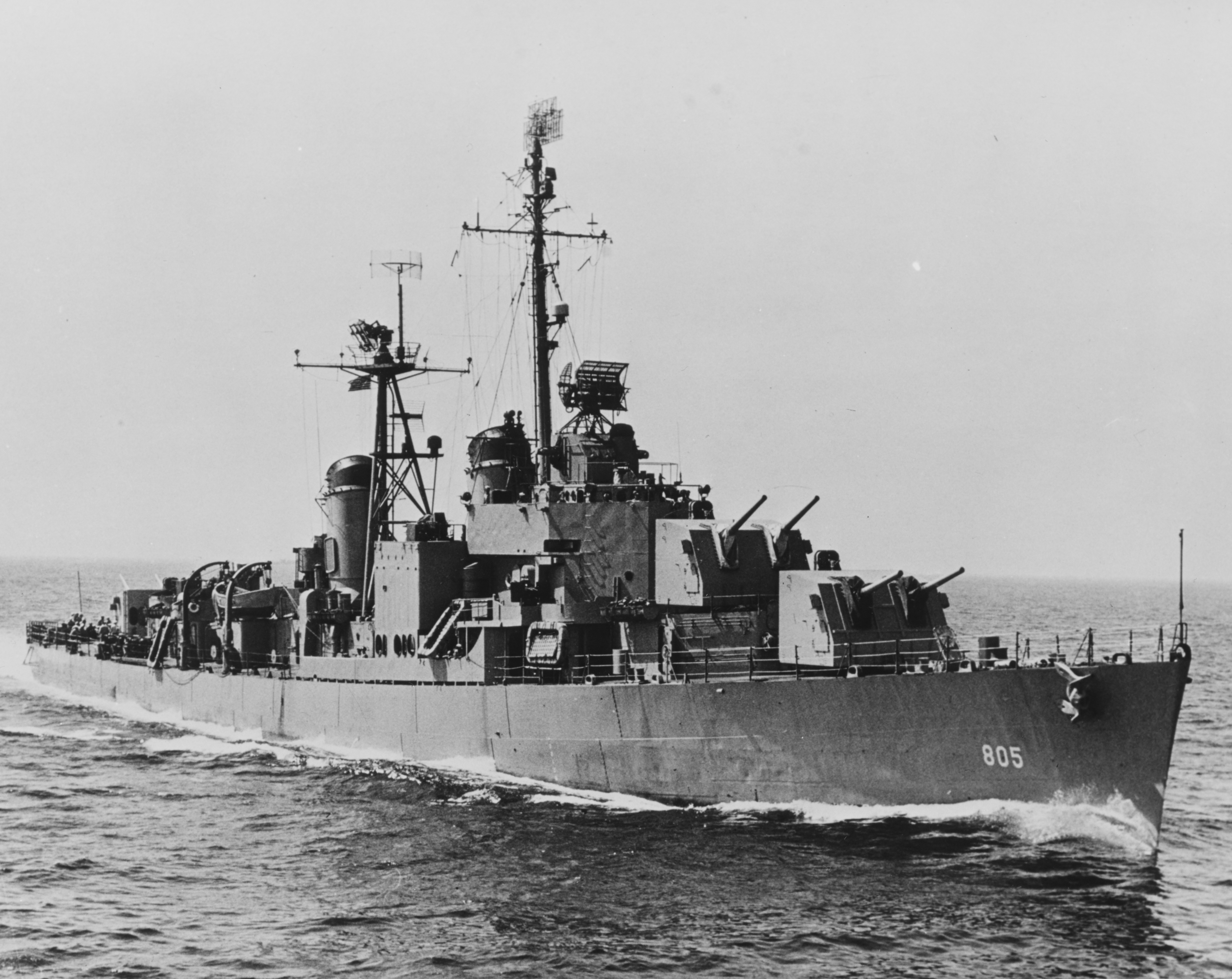
- USS Chevalier in the 1940s

History

United States
- Name: Chevalier
- Namesake: Godfrey DeCourcelles Chevalier
- Builder: Bath Iron Works
- Laid down: 12 June 1944
- Launched: 29 October 1944
- Commissioned: 9 January 1945
- Decommissioned: 1 July 1972
- Reclassified: DDR-805, 18 March 1949; DD-805, 13 July 1962
- Stricken: 2 June 1975
- Identification: Callsign: NKSL; Hull number: DD-805
- Nickname(s): Chevy
- Fate: Transferred to South Korea, 5 July 1972
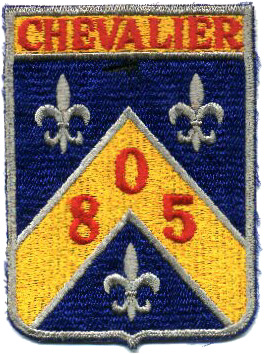
- Badge

South Korea
- Name: Chungbuk; (충북)
- Namesake: Chungbuk
- Acquired: 5 July 1972
- Identification: Hull number: DD-915
- Fate: Scrapped, December 2000

General characteristics
- Class & type: Gearing-class destroyer; Chungbuk-class destroyer
- Displacement: 2,425 long tons (2,464 t) (standard); 3,460 long tons (3,520 t) (full)
- Length: 390 ft 6 in (119.0 m) (overall)
- Beam: 40 ft 10 in (12.45 m)
- Draught: 14 ft 4 in (4.37 m)
- Propulsion: 2 × geared turbines; 2 × propellers
- Speed: 35 kn (65 km/h; 40 mph)
- Range: 4,500 nmi (8,300 km; 5,200 mi) at 20 kn (37 km/h; 23 mph)
- Complement: 336
- Armament: 6 × 5 in (127 mm)/38 cal guns (in 3 x 2 mounts); 16 × 40 mm (1.57 in) Bofors AA guns (3 × 4 & 2 × 2); 11 × 20 mm (0.79 in) Oerlikon cannons; 2 × Depth charge racks; 6 × K-gun depth charge throwers

USS Chevalier (DD/DDR-805) was a Gearing-class destroyer of the United States Navy, the second Navy ship named for Lieutenant Commander Godfrey DeC. Chevalier (1889–1922), a pioneer of naval aviation.

Chevalier was launched 29 October 1944 by Bath Iron Works, Bath, Maine; sponsored by Mrs. G. DeC. Chevalier; and commissioned 9 January 1945. She was ordered as a radar picket destroyer. Her mid-section torpedo tubes were removed to make room for a second radar mast and aft torpedo tubes were replaced with quad mounted 40 mm Bofors AA guns to protect her against Kamikaze attacks.

== History ==
Chevalier cleared Guantanamo Bay 18 June 1945, and reached Pearl Harbor 9 July. On the 24th, she sailed to join in the bombardment of Wake on 1 August, arriving at Eniwetok next day. She joined Task Force 38 (TF 38) off Honshū 18 August, and with her force entered Tokyo Bay 26 August. After patrol and escort assignments supporting occupation activities in the Marianas and Philippines, Chevalier sailed from Saipan 25 March 1946 for San Diego, arriving 11 April.

Before the Korean War, Chevalier completed tours of duty in the western Pacific in 1946–7, and 1948–9, and maintained her readiness through local operations from San Diego. On 18 March 1949, she was reclassified DDR-805, a radar picket destroyer, and during the summer and fall of 1949 operated in the Hawaiian Islands. During the Korean War, she served actively in the Far East between 6 July 1950 and 25 March 1951; 15 October 1951 and 31 May 1952: and 2 January 1953 and 22 August 1953. Her duty during the major portion of each tour was to join the protective screen of TF 77, the carrier force which launched almost continuous raids on North Korea. She also sailed on protective patrol in the Taiwan Straits.

Chevalier's post-war operating schedule alternated tours of duty with the guardian 7th Fleet with necessary overhaul and training activities along the west coast. In 1954, 1955, 1956–57, 1957–58, 1958–59, and 1960, she sailed for the visits to Far Eastern and Australian ports, patrol duty in the Taiwan Straits, and exercises off Japan, Okinawa, and in the Philippines which are a part of Far Eastern deployment.

Chevalier's classification reverted to DD-805 13 July 1962.

[1962–1972]

1971, Vietnam shore bombardment North and South Vietnam, yankee station Vietnam. Helped in the mining of Haiphong Harbor, (Operation Pocket Money, the mining campaign against principal North Vietnamese ports, was launched on 9 May 1972.)

== ROKS Chung Buk ==
Chevalier was transferred to South Korea on 5 July 1972. She served in the Republic of Korea Navy as ROKS Chung Buk. She was sold for scrap and dismantled in December 2000.

== Awards ==
Chevalier received one battle star for World War II service, and nine for Korean War service.
