= Aeromarine 39 =

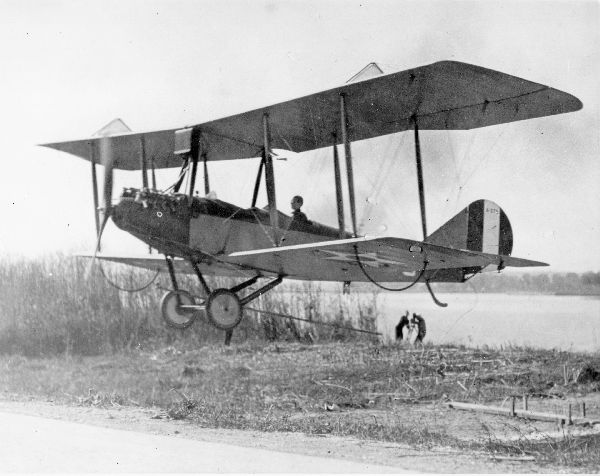

General information
- Type: Land or water-based trainer
- Manufacturer: Aeromarine Plane and Motor Company
- Primary user: United States Navy
- Number built: 150

The Aeromarine 39 was an American two-seat training seaplane ordered by the US Navy in 1917 and built by the Aeromarine Plane and Motor Company of Keyport, New Jersey. Of conventional biplane configuration and construction, the aircraft was designed so that its pontoons could be speedily detached and replaced with wheeled undercarriage for shore operations.

== History ==
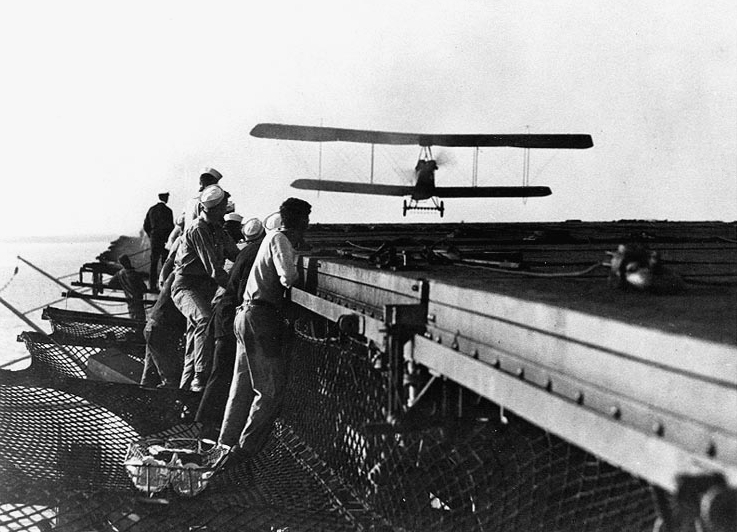
An Aeromarine 39 approaches U.S.S. Langley during landing trials in October 1922

Fifty of the original design (later referred to as the 39A) were produced, featuring twin floats and powered by a Hall-Scott A-7 engine. A redesign followed, increasing the wingspan to create more lift for water take-offs. This became known as the 39B. Other changes included a change to a single pontoon with outrigger floats, an enlarged vertical tail, and a change of powerplant to the Curtiss OXX.

On October 26, 1922 Godfrey DeCourcelles Chevalier landed a 39B on a moving ship, USS Langley, the first time this had been achieved on an American aircraft carrier. Trials of underway carrier takeoffs and landings continued through 1922 and 1923.

== Survivors ==
An example of a 39B is preserved at the Old Rhinebeck Aerodrome, although it has been severely damaged by two fires, one in 1966 and one in the early 1980s.

== Operators ==
United States

- United States Navy

== Specifications (Aeromarine 39B) ==
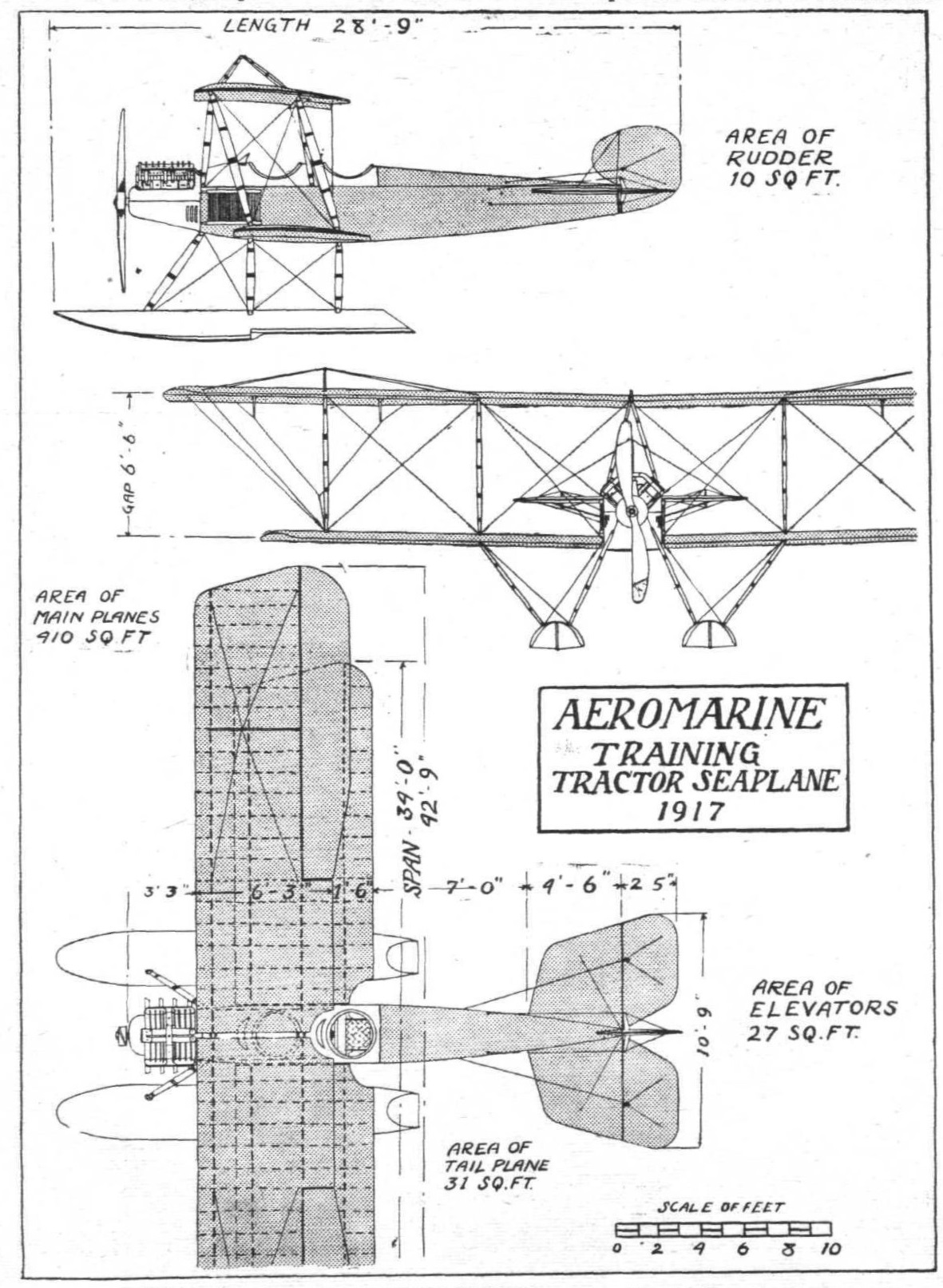
Aeromarine 39A 3 view drawing Flight Magazine 1917-08-02 pg.784

Data from United States Navy Aircraft since 1911

General characteristics

- Length: 30 ft 4 1/4 in (9.25 m)
- Wingspan: 47 ft 0 in (14.33 m)
- Height: 13 ft 2 in (4.01 m)
- Wing area: 494 sq ft (45.9 m^{2})
- Empty weight: 1,939 lb (880 kg)
- Gross weight: 2,505 lb (1,136 kg)
- Powerplant: 1 × Curtiss OXX-6 water-cooled V-8 engine, 100 hp (75 kW)

Performance

- Maximum speed: 73 mph (117 km/h, 63 kn)
- Range: 273 mi (439 km, 237 nmi)
- Service ceiling: 5,000 ft (1,500 m) +
- Time to altitude: 30.6 minutes to 5,000 ft (1,500 m)
