= Fort Barrancas =

- Fort San Carlos De Barrancas
- U.S. National Register of Historic Places
- U.S. National Historic Landmark
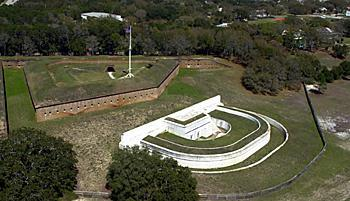
- Aerial view of Fort Barrancas. The water battery is the white section.
- Location: Warrington, Florida, U.S.
- Nearest city: Pensacola
- Coordinates: 30°20′52.22″N 87°17′51.22″W
- Built: 1787
- NRHP reference No.: 66000263

Significant dates
- Added to NRHP: October 15, 1966
- Designated NHL: October 9, 1960

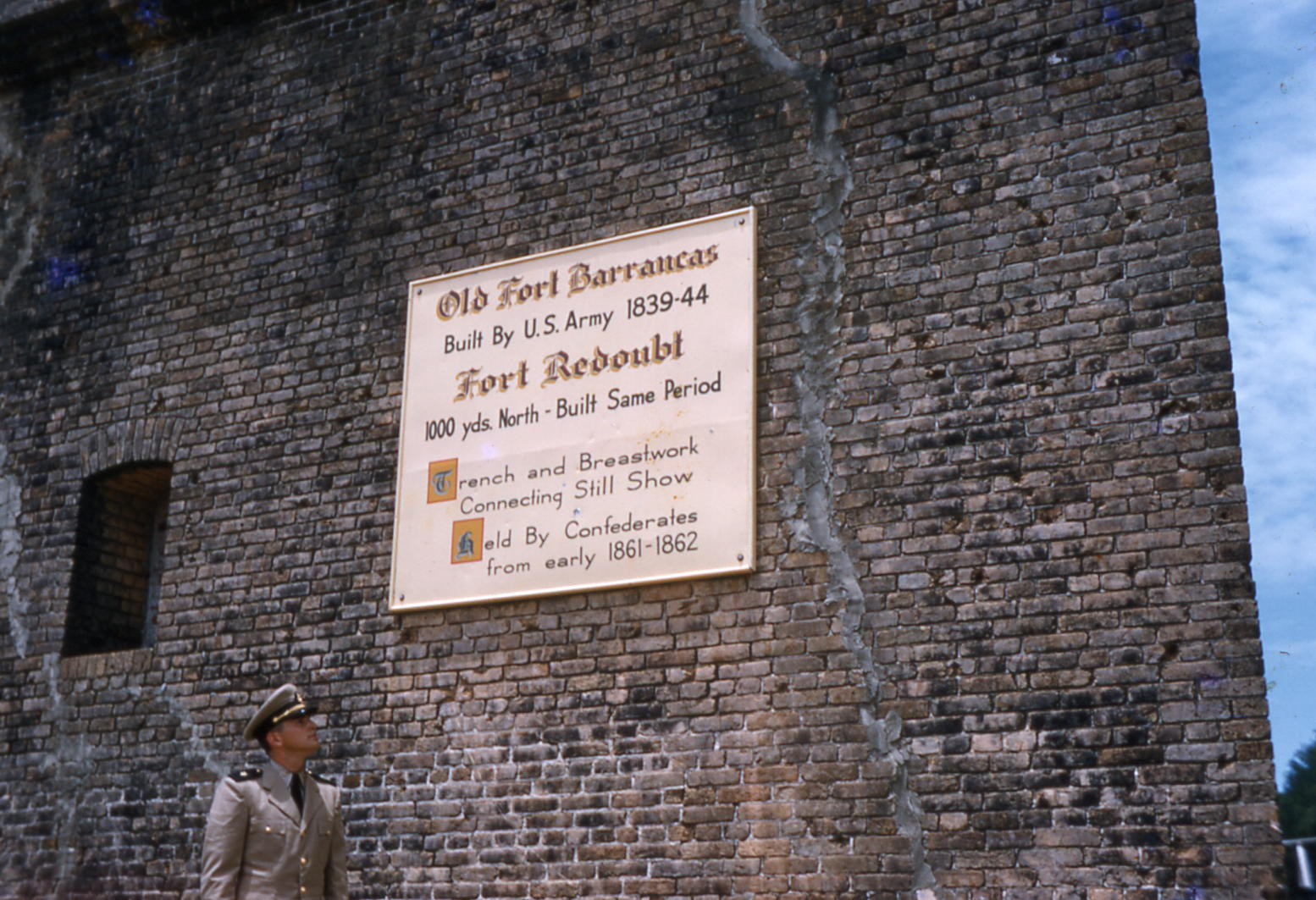
Commemorative plaque (1956)

Fort Barrancas (1839) or Fort San Carlos de Barrancas (from 1787) is a United States military fort and National Historic Landmark in the former Warrington area of Pensacola, Florida, located physically within Naval Air Station Pensacola, which was developed later around it.

The hill-top fort, connected to a sea level water battery, overlooks Pensacola Bay. From 1839 to 1844, the historic Spanish fort on the hill was reconstructed and dramatically expanded in brick. The older, water battery downhill (Bateria de San Antonio, 1787) has been separately named as "Fort San Carlos". It is a remnant from the Spanish fortification, the wooden (Spanish: Fuerte) Fort San Carlos de Barrancas of the late 18th century.

Between World War I and World War II, the fort was used as a Citizens' Military Training Camp.

Due to changing requirements, the U.S. Army deactivated Fort Barrancas on April 15, 1947, following World War II. Designated a National Historic Landmark (NHL) in 1960, the fort was transferred to the control and administration of the National Park Service in 1971. After extensive restoration during 1971–1980, Fort Barrancas was opened to the public (see below: Timeline).

== History ==
=== Construction ===
Fort San Carlos de Austria was constructed by the Spanish in 1698. It was besieged in 1707 by Native Americans under the general leadership of some English traders, but was not taken. In 1719 French forces captured Pensacola and destroyed the Spanish fort.

Following Britain's success over the French in the Seven Years' War, in 1763 it exchanged some territory with Spain and took over West Florida. The British used this site as a harbor fortification, building the Royal Navy Redoubt in 1763. More than a decade later, as enemies of the British, the Spanish joined the war against them in 1779 during the American Revolutionary War, though they never officially became American allies. They took Pensacola in 1781. After the war, the Spanish retook control of West Florida. They completed the fort San Carlos de Barrancas in 1797. Barranca is a Spanish word for bluff, the natural terrain feature that makes this location ideal for the fortress.

=== First battles under U.S. control ===
During the War of 1812 between the United States and the United Kingdom, Fort San Carlos De Barrancas was abandoned by the British, in the face of advancing American troops, who had already captured Fort San Miguel and its Spanish garrison numbering 268 troops surrendered on November 7. General Andrew Jackson had planned to capture the fort by storming it the next day, but it was blown up and abandoned before Jackson could move on it. The remaining British withdrew from Pensacola along with the British naval squadron commanded by Captain Gordon.

American units raided West Florida. In 1818, the Spanish garrison of the fort exchanged cannon fire with an American battery for a few days. The U.S. force was led by General Jackson. Eventually the Spanish surrendered the fort, leaving Pensacola in American hands.

When the United States purchased Florida from Spain in 1821, it selected Pensacola as the site for a major Navy Yard, which was developed around the Spanish Fort Barrancas. In addition, the US developed plans for construction of additional harbor fortifications to protect this deepwater bay. Fort Pickens was completed on Santa Rosa Island in 1834, and Fort McRee was completed in 1839 to defend the pass to Pensacola Bay.

Fort Barrancas was reconstructed and expanded with brick between 1839 and 1844 on its hilltop overlooking the bay. It was strengthened to defend against both ships entering the harbor and attack across land. The Advanced Redoubt was built north of the fort, and a trenchline connected them. This system protected the Navy Yard to the east from infantry attacks.

The expanded Fort Barrancas was designed by Joseph Gilbert Totten. It was connected to the Spanish-built water-battery by an underground walkway tunnel. Major William Henry Chase supervised the construction, done mostly by Black slaves.

=== American Civil War ===
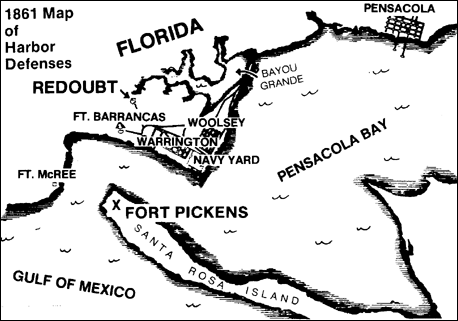
Sketch showing 1861 harbor defenses at entrance to Pensacola Bay. The town of Warrington (shown east of Fort Barrancas) was relocated north of Bayou Grande in the 1930s to provide land for Naval Air Station Pensacola.

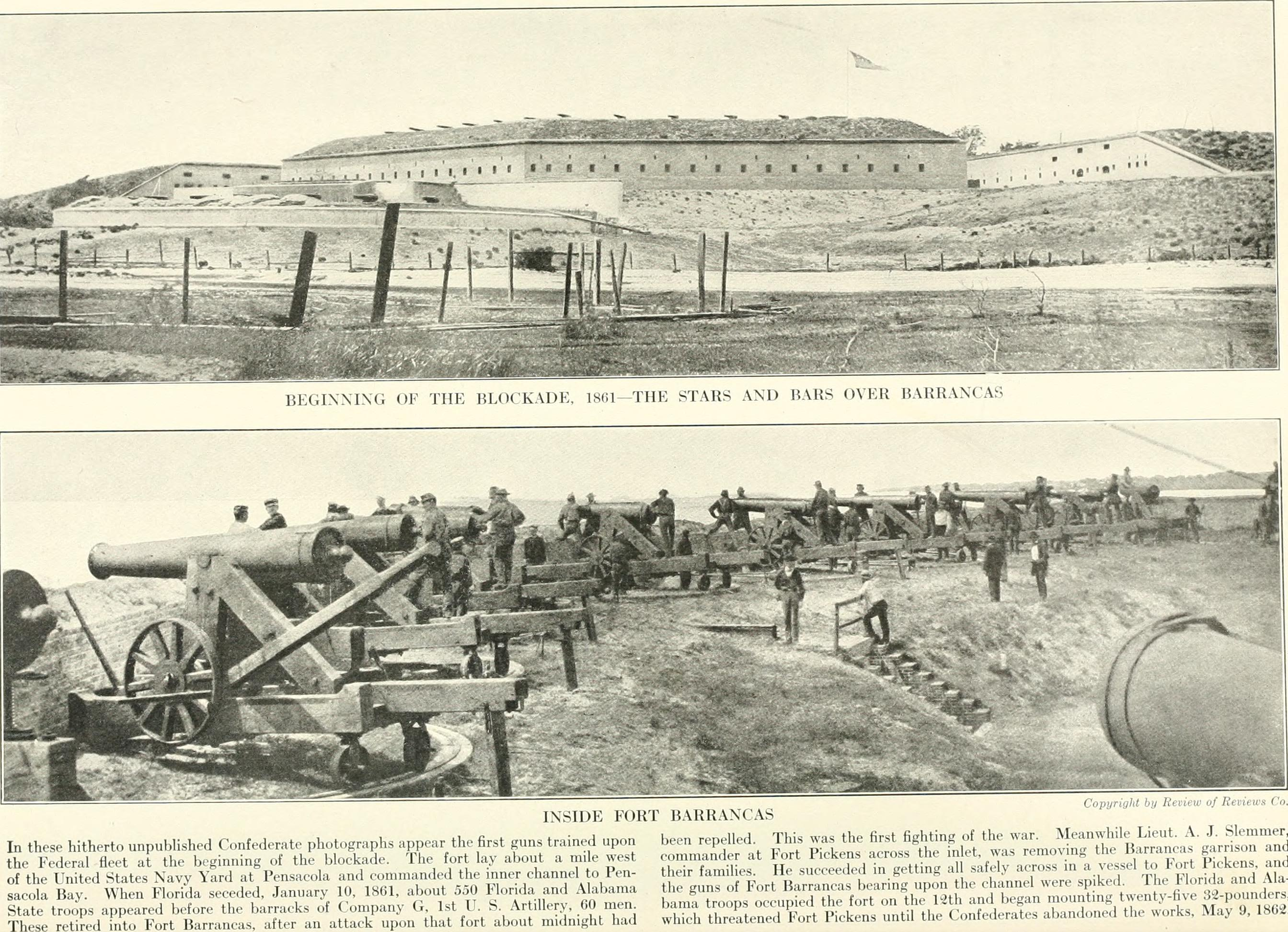
Photos of the fort and its garrison at the outbreak of the Civil War.

On January 8, 1861, more than three months before the American Civil War officially started at Fort Sumter, South Carolina, a company of 50 U.S. Army soldiers stationed at Fort Barrancas, under the command of John H. Winder, fired upon a militia of Florida state troops, under Colonel William Henry Chase, who demanded for the U.S. troops to surrender the fort. Lieutenant Adam J. Slemmer, acting commander in Winder's absence, had the troops fire shots meant to repel the militia. Slemmer knew that Fort Pickens was easier to defend and so he spiked the guns at Barrancas, loaded ammunition and supplies on a flatboat, and moved his company across the bay to Fort Pickens. The Union held the fort throughout the Civil War.

The Confederacy stationed soldiers from Alabama, Louisiana, and Mississippi at Fort Barrancas. While a small company of soldiers could man the fort successfully, the Confederate Army fortified the position with additional sand batteries along the coast, to be operated by the garrison. General Braxton Bragg took command of Confederate Pensacola on March 11, 1861, and continued work on the batteries.

On October 9, a Confederate force of 1000 troops landed east of Fort Pickens but was repelled by Union forces. Fort McRee and Fort Barrancas exchanged heavy cannon fire with Fort Pickens on November 22–23, 1861 and January 1, 1862. However, in May 1862, after learning that the Union Army had taken New Orleans, Confederate troops abandoned Pensacola.

=== Aftermath ===
Stronger, rifled cannon and ironclad ships developed during the Civil War made masonry forts like Fort Barrancas outmoded. The fort was used as a signal station, small arms range, and storage area by the Army until 1946. Newer weapon technology developed during World War II made coastal defense artillery forts completely obsolete.

On April 15, 1947, Fort Barrancas was deactivated. The U.S. Navy incorporated the site into Naval Air Station Pensacola. At the same time, local leaders, Congress, and the National Park Service were working to designate the harbor defenses of Pensacola as a historic national monument. In 1971, Congress authorized the establishment of the Gulf Islands National Seashore, to be managed by the National Park Service. Fort Barrancas was included in this. After a $1.2 million restoration, Fort Barrancas was opened to the public in 1980.

Fort Barrancas and the nearby Advanced Redoubt are located on Naval Air Station Pensacola but they are both managed as historic properties by the National Park Service. Access to Naval Air Station Pensacola by non-Department of Defense affiliated personnel may be subject to homeland security and military force protection concerns.

== Timeline ==
Fort Barrancas and its site has changed names several times over the past five centuries, depending on which country ruled in the region:

- 1559–1561: The Spanish first settled a portion of Santa Rosa Island, they did not use this hilltop site at all;
- 1698: the Spanish constructed Fort San Carlos de Austria on this hilltop;
- 1719: Fort San Carlos de Austria was destroyed by the French;
- 1763: under British rule, Royal Navy Redoubt is constructed of earth and logs;
- 1787: under Spanish rule (from 1781), the sea-level battery, Bateria de San Antonio, is built of masonry;
- 1787–1797: under Spanish rule, Fort San Carlos de Barrancas, a wooden and earthen structure, is added on the hill-top bluff overlooking the battery;
- 1814: Fort San Carlos de Barrancas is demolished by the evacuating British during the War of 1812 as Andrew Jackson approaches;
- 1817: again under Spanish control, San Carlos de Barrancas is rebuilt;
- 1839–1844: under U.S. rule following purchase of Florida from Spain (from 1821), the wooden hill-top structure is replaced with a massive brick fortress connected via tunnel to the water-side battery (remodeled in 1838), with the entire site comprising Fort Barrancas;
- 1845–1869: the Advanced Redoubt is built 1400 ft (427 m) north of the fort;
- 1861: With the outbreak of the American Civil War, Union forces abandoned Fort Barrancas and defended Fort Pickens; Barrancas was taken over by Confederates; the fort was bombarded from Union-held Fort Pickens on Santa Rosa Island, with heaviest attacks on November 22–23 and January 7, 1862;
- 1862: in May after the fall of New Orleans to Union forces, Fort Barrancas and the City of Pensacola were abandoned by Confederate troops (after the fall of New Orleans);
- 1870: The Pensacola and Fort Barrancas Railroad, an eight-mile line connecting Pensacola, Florida, with the fort, through Warrington and Woolsey, is constructed during the Reconstruction era to improve infrastructure in the state. The line had several corporate ownerships before the rail link on Naval Air Station Pensacola was abandoned circa 1979. Related track and bridges across several waterways was removed.
- 1941–1947: Fort Barrancas is used by the U.S. Army as a signal station and small arms range during World War II and deactivated in 1947;
- 1960: on October 9, Fort San Carlos de Barrancas is designated as a National Historic Landmark.
- 1966: Fort Barrancas Historical District (640 acres) is listed on the National Register of Historic Places, as district #66000263.
- 1971: Fort Barrancas becomes part of the Gulf Islands National Seashore managed by the U.S. National Park Service;
- 1978–1980: Fort Barrancas is restored during an 18-month project and opened to the public as a National Historic Landmark.
- 1989: Fort Barrancas is listed in A Guide to Florida's Historic Architecture, published by the University of Florida Press.

== Museum ==
Fort Barrancas currently houses a visitor center for the Gulf Islands National Seashore. The visitor center has exhibits which explain the fort's history. Visitors can tour the restored fort and the battery. Tours of the advanced redoubt are also available. Visitors must receive permission at the security checkpoint of Naval Air Station Pensacola to pass through the grounds of the base to reach the fort.

== See also ==
- 13th Coast Artillery (United States)
