= Warrington, Florida =

- CDP
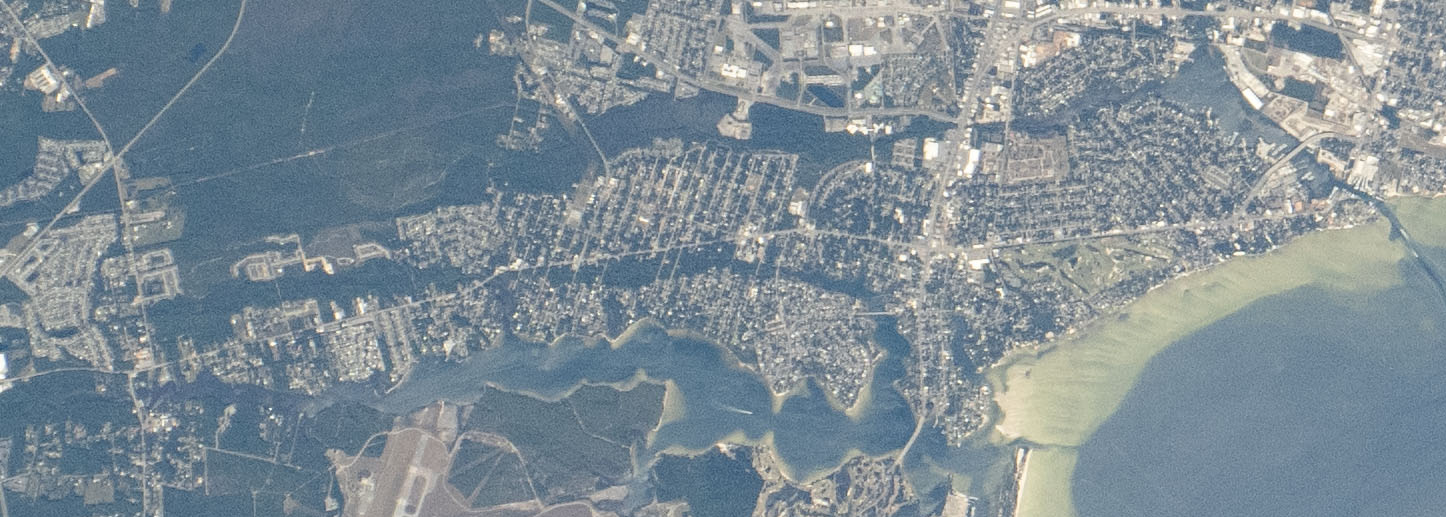
- View from ISS Expedition 72, November 2024

- Location in Escambia County and the state of Florida
- Coordinates: 30°23′18″N 87°17′23″W
- Country: United States
- State: Florida
- County: Escambia

Area
  - Total: 8.02 sq mi (20.76 km^{2})
  - Land: 6.93 sq mi (17.95 km^{2})
  - Water: 1.08 sq mi (2.81 km^{2})
- Elevation: 10 ft (3.0 m)

Population (2020)
  - Total: 15,218
  - Density: 2,195.5/sq mi (847.69/km^{2})
- Time zone: UTC−6 (Central (CST))
  - Summer (DST): UTC−5 (CDT)
- FIPS code: 12-75200
- GNIS feature ID: 2402985

Warrington is a census-designated place (CDP) in Escambia County, Florida, United States. Warrington is located between downtown Pensacola and the state line with Alabama; it is 6 miles (10 km) away from both.

The population was 15,218 at the 2020 census, up from 14,531 at the 2010 census. It is part of the Pensacola–Ferry Pass–Brent, Florida Metropolitan Statistical Area.

A failed referendum was held in 1975 to incorporate Warrington as a town. Despite falling outside of city limits and having a post office explicitly named "Warrington", mail going to the addresses in the Warrington ZIP code (32507) falls under the jurisdiction of Pensacola.

Naval Air Station Pensacola is located in Warrington, albeit with their own ZIP code, 32508, corresponding to the mailing city "Naval Air Station Pensacola, FL", as well as their own census-designated place "Pensacola Station".

== History ==
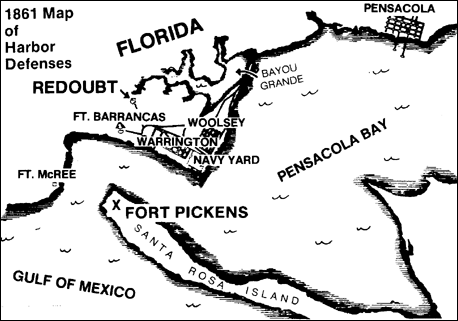
Sketch showing 1861 harbor defenses for Pensacola Bay. The town of Warrington (shown east of Fort Barrancas) was moved north of Bayou Grande in the 1930s, to provide land for Naval Air Station Pensacola.

Warrington is named for Lewis Warrington, who served as Secretary of the Navy, and who helped choose the area that became Naval Air Station Pensacola. He served as the first commandant of the newly created Navy Yard, 1826–1827.

Warrington was created shortly after the Pensacola Navy Yard's 1826 foundation. Commodore Melancthon Taylor Woolsey, the second commandant of the Navy Yard (1827–1831), "created two villages, Warrington, and Woolsey outside the navy yard for homebuilding." Warrington was between the yard and Fort Barrancas. The town was relocated north of Bayou Grande in the 1930s to make additional space available for the expanding Naval Air Station.

== Geography ==
According to the United States Census Bureau, the CDP has a total area of 8.9 square miles (23.0 km^{2}), of which 6.9 square miles (17.9 km^{2}) is land and 2.0 square miles (5.1 km^{2}), or 21.97%, is water.

Climate data for Pensacola Forest Sherman NAS, Florida, 1981–2010 normals, extremes 1949–present
Month	Jan	Feb	Mar	Apr	May	Jun	Jul	Aug	Sep	Oct	Nov	Dec	Year
Record high °F (°C)	80 (27)	82 (28)	85 (29)	95 (35)	96 (36)	103 (39)	104 (40)	105 (41)	98 (37)	92 (33)	86 (30)	82 (28)	105 (41)
Mean daily maximum °F (°C)	60.3 (15.7)	63.3 (17.4)	68.4 (20.2)	74.4 (23.6)	81.9 (27.7)	87.1 (30.6)	89.0 (31.7)	88.6 (31.4)	85.7 (29.8)	78.4 (25.8)	70.3 (21.3)	62.7 (17.1)	75.8 (24.4)
Mean daily minimum °F (°C)	42.0 (5.6)	45.3 (7.4)	50.5 (10.3)	57.0 (13.9)	65.5 (18.6)	72.1 (22.3)	74.5 (23.6)	74.5 (23.6)	70.2 (21.2)	59.9 (15.5)	51.1 (10.6)	44.7 (7.1)	58.9 (15.0)
Record low °F (°C)	6 (−14)	12 (−11)	21 (−6)	32 (0)	44 (7)	46 (8)	61 (16)	59 (15)	46 (8)	31 (−1)	21 (−6)	7 (−14)	6 (−14)
Average precipitation inches (mm)	4.52 (115)	5.11 (130)	5.47 (139)	4.04 (103)	4.08 (104)	5.70 (145)	7.40 (188)	5.78 (147)	6.16 (156)	4.94 (125)	3.85 (98)	4.15 (105)	61.2 (1,555)
Average rainy days (≥ 0.01 in)	9	8	8	6	6	9	13	13	9	7	7	9	104

== Demographics ==
Historical population
Census	Pop.	Note	%±
1950	13,570		—
1960	16,752		23.4%
1970	15,848		−5.4%
1980	15,792		−0.4%
1990	16,040		1.6%
2000	15,207		−5.2%
2010	14,531		−4.4%
2020	15,218		4.7%

=== 2020 census ===
As of the 2020 census, Warrington had a population of 15,218. The median age was 41.4 years. 21.0% of residents were under the age of 18 and 19.0% of residents were 65 years of age or older. For every 100 females there were 94.9 males, and for every 100 females age 18 and over there were 90.6 males age 18 and over.

100.0% of residents lived in urban areas, while 0.0% lived in rural areas.

There were 6,809 households in Warrington, of which 24.2% had children under the age of 18 living in them. Of all households, 33.2% were married-couple households, 23.7% were households with a male householder and no spouse or partner present, and 34.7% were households with a female householder and no spouse or partner present. About 34.5% of all households were made up of individuals and 13.7% had someone living alone who was 65 years of age or older.

There were 7,780 housing units, of which 12.5% were vacant. The homeowner vacancy rate was 1.4% and the rental vacancy rate was 10.6%.

Racial composition as of the 2020 census
Race	Number	Percent
White	9,996	65.7%
Black or African American	3,095	20.3%
American Indian and Alaska Native	103	0.7%
Asian	358	2.4%
Native Hawaiian and Other Pacific Islander	33	0.2%
Some other race	331	2.2%
Two or more races	1,302	8.6%
Hispanic or Latino (of any race)	1,000	6.6%

=== 2000 census ===
As of the census of 2000, there were 15,207 people, 6,547 households, and 4,046 families residing in the CDP. The population density was 2,314.1 inhabitants per square mile (893.5/km^{2}). There were 7,582 housing units at an average density of 1,153.8 per square mile (445.5/km^{2}). The racial makeup of the CDP was 71.57% White, 21.69% African American, 1.05% Native American, 2.08% Asian, 0.16% Pacific Islander, 0.91% from other races, and 2.54% from two or more races. Hispanic or Latino of any race were 2.88% of the population.

There were 6,547 households, out of which 28.4% had children under the age of 18 living with them, 38.7% were married couples living together, 18.5% had a female householder with no husband present, and 38.2% were non-families. 31.3% of all households were made up of individuals, and 12.0% had someone living alone who was 65 years of age or older. The average household size was 2.32 and the average family size was 2.89.

In the CDP, the population was spread out, with 25.7% under the age of 18, 9.4% from 18 to 24, 27.7% from 25 to 44, 21.8% from 45 to 64, and 15.4% who were 65 years of age or older. The median age was 36 years. For every 100 females, there were 92.3 males. For every 100 females age 18 and over, there were 87.2 males.

The median income for a household in the CDP was $30,459, and the median income for a family was $35,892. Males had a median income of $29,083 versus $19,375 for females. The per capita income for the CDP was $17,876. About 17.5% of families and 20.6% of the population were below the poverty line, including 33.8% of those under age 18 and 6.0% of those age 65 or over.

== Education ==
Warrington is part of the Escambia County School District, which serves the entire county.
