= Snow in Florida =

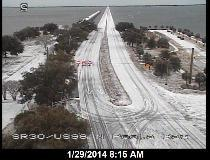
Ice and snow as seen from an FDOT camera on the Bay Bridge in far northern Florida, following a winter storm on January 28–29, 2014. Much of the region experienced significant ice buildup (from freezing rain and sleet) followed by a light snowfall.

It is rare for snow to fall in the U.S. state of Florida, especially in the central and southern portions of the state. With the exception of the far northern areas of the state, most of the major cities in Florida have never recorded measurable snowfall, though trace amounts have been recorded, or flurries in the air observed, a few times each century. According to the National Weather Service, in the Florida Keys and Key West there is no known occurrence of snow flurries since the European colonization of the region more than 300 years ago. In Miami, Fort Lauderdale, and West Palm Beach there has been only one report of snow flurries in the air in more than 200 years; this occurred in January 1977.

Due to Florida's low latitude and tropical and humid subtropical climate, temperatures low enough to support significant snowfall are infrequent and their duration is fleeting. In general, frost is more common than snow, requiring temperatures of 32 °F (0 °C) or less at 2 m (7 ft) above sea level, a cloudless sky, and a relative humidity of 65% or more. Generally, for snow to occur in Florida, the polar jet stream must move southward through Texas and into the Gulf of Mexico, with a stalled cold front across the southern portion of the state curving northeastward to combine freezing air into the frontal clouds. While light snowfall occurs a few times each decade across the northern panhandle of Florida, most of the state is too far south of the cold continental air masses that are responsible for generating snowfall in the rest of the country. The mean maximum monthly snowfall in most parts of Florida is zero. The only other areas in the continental United States with this distinction are southern and southeast Texas (around McAllen and Houston) and parts of coastal Southern California and Southern Arizona at low elevations.

Much of the known information on snow in Florida prior to 1900 is from climatological records provided by the National Weather Service meteorological station in Jacksonville; information for other locations is sparse. The earliest recorded instance of snow in Florida was in 1774; being unaccustomed to snow, some Jacksonville residents called it "extraordinary white rain". The first White Christmas in northeastern Florida's history resulted from snow that fell on December 23, 1989.

== Events ==
The vast majority of snow events in Florida occurred in North Florida and the Jacksonville area. According to the National Weather Service, the record snowfall for the city of Jacksonville is 1.9 inches (4.8 cm), which fell on February 12, 1899. Tampa has a record snowfall of 0.2 inches (0.5 cm) which occurred on January 19, 1977.

Due to larger populations and more advanced communication networks, snow events are witnessed and reported much more frequently in recent years than in historical eras. Interpretations of this timeline must therefore be made with caution, as observed patterns may not reflect actual climate-related trends in annual snowfall but rather improved reporting. Additionally, the presence of hard rime or ice pellets being mistaken for snowflakes should also be considered. Finally, many of the reports below are not "official" National Weather Service reports, many being compiled by the newspapers and media, personal observations, and stories passed down through the years.

=== Pre-1900 (21 reported events) ===
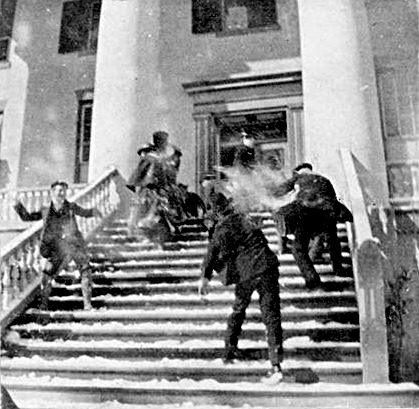
Snowball fight on the steps of the Florida Capitol, February 1899

- December 19, 1765: A "white frost" fell in the northern part of the British colony of East Florida "of short duration, and of no material detriment to the agricultural interests".
- 1774: A snowstorm extended across much of the territory. The affected residents spoke of it as an "extraordinary white rain".
- January 10–11, 1800: Land surveyor Andrew Ellicott erected an observatory at Point Peter, a location near the mouth of Saint Marys River, now in the far southeast side of the City of St. Marys, Georgia. After recording a sunrise temperature of 37 °F (3 °C) on January 10, he observed "snow and hail the whole day" until 10 pm. The temperature then fell below freezing, the wind shifted to northwesterly, and the skies cleared at midnight. At sunrise the next morning, he reported snow 5 inches (12.7 cm) deep and a temperature of 28 °F (−2 °C). This snowstorm perhaps extended from Louisiana to Georgia.
- January 13, 1852: Snow fell all morning, accumulating to 0.5 inches (1.3 cm) at Jacksonville.
- February 28, 1855: A few flakes of snow fell at Jacksonville.
- January 29, 1868: Light sleet fell during the night at Jacksonville.
- February 28, 1869: During the morning, snow flurries were seen at Jacksonville.
- January 10, 1873: At 7:25 am, a few snowflakes fell at Jacksonville.
- February 4–5, 1875: Between midnight and sunrise on both dates, light sleet occurred.
- December 1, 1876: According to the observer at Punta Rassa, Florida, snow fell for 5 minutes on the morning of December 1.
- January 4–5, 1879: At Jacksonville at 7 pm on the 4th, sleet began, which turned to rain 90 minutes later. The freezing rain covered trees, shrubbery, and everything else outdoors by morning. The weight of the ice broke the limbs of many orange trees. At Fernandina, snow occurred.
- December 5, 1886: At Pensacola, following a heavy rain and wind storm, light snow fell from 4:25 pm to 8:20 pm, accumulating to 1.5 inches (3.8 cm).
- January 5, 1887: 1 inch (2.5 cm) of snow fell at Pensacola, and sleet fell elsewhere in the state.
- January 14, 1892: 0.4 inches (1.0 cm) of snow was reported at Pensacola. The first snowfall of the season occurred at Fort Barrancas. Monthly snowfall totaled 0.5 inches (1.3 cm) at Pensacola.
- January 17, 1892: At 10:30 am, sleet fell for a few minutes only at Madison, Florida.
- February 14, 1892: Pensacola reported 3 inches (7.6 cm) of snow.
- December 26–27, 1892: On both days, precipitation fell as sleet and snow at Pensacola. On December 26, sleet also occurred at Cerro Gordo, Florida, and a slight trace of snow fell at Tallahassee. On December 27, a slight trace fell at Moseley Hall, Madison County, Florida. At intervals during daytime on December 27, light snow flurries occurred at Jacksonville.
- January 16–19, 1893: On January 16, snow occurred at Palatka. On January 17, sleet fell at Oxford, and at Pensacola. Shortly after midnight on January 18, sleet began in the city of Jacksonville and then turned to snow and then to rain. That day, sleet also fell at Moseley Hall, Pensacola, and Tallahassee, and snow occurred at Lawtey. On January 18 and 19, sleet fell at Bristol.
- December 29, 1894: Brooksville reported snowfall from 9 am to 11 am, and a few flakes fell at Mosquito Lagoon near Oak Hill, Florida. The press reported snow at towns in middle and west Florida. The temperature that morning fell to lows unprecedented in decades, and this freeze destroyed 2 million to 3 million boxes of not yet gathered oranges, severely damaged pineapple plants, and killed or destroyed almost all other fruits and vegetables.
- February 14, 1895: From 6:22 pm to 6:27 pm, light sleet fell at Jacksonville, followed by light snow until 6:32 pm. At 7:20 pm, light snow resumed until 8 pm. Snow also fell at Tampa. At Pensacola, snow reportedly reached depths allowing for sleighing.
- February 12–13, 1899: At 9:45 pm on February 12, rain changed to sleet at Jacksonville. Sleet then changed to snow at 10:15 pm and continued through the night, accumulating 2 inches (5.1 cm) before sunrise at 7 am as the temperature plunged to 10 °F (−12 °C). The accumulation reached 4 inches (10.2 cm) at Lake Butler. In sheltered locations, the snow did not melt for several days. This Great Blizzard of 1899 also affected much of the rest of the American South, and brought Florida its only ever subzero temperature (below −18 °C).

=== 20th century (22 reported events) ===
- December 16, 1901: At 1 pm, light snow fell at Jacksonville; at intervals through the afternoon, sleet followed.
- February 7, 1907: During the afternoon, a light snow flurry occurred "in the immediate vicinity" of the city of Jacksonville.
- November 27, 1912: An overnight period of snow covered the ground and trees with a 0.5-inch (1.3 cm) layer in northern Florida.
- January 22–23, 1935: Snow fell on January 22 and until the next morning, with Pensacola recording 1 inch (2.5 cm).
- February 8–9, 1947: A cold wave entering from Canada, accompanied by winds of up to 80 miles per hour (130 km/h; 36 m/s), caused snow as far south as Clearwater.
- February 2–3, 1951: Snowfall accumulated to 2 inches (5.1 cm) at Saint Augustine and Crescent City.
- December 14, 1952: Sleet and snow fell across the northern portion of the state, but very little accumulated.
- December 14, 1953: Light sleet occurred in the morning in Marianna.
- March 6, 1954: 4 inches (10.2 cm) of snow accumulated at Milton Experimental Station, Santa Rosa County, within a 24-hour period.
- March 28, 1955: Snowfall accumulated to 1 inch (2.5 cm) in Marianna along the Florida Panhandle. This is the only known instance of snowfall in Florida occurring after the spring equinox.
- December 12–13, 1957: Snow was reported, and freezing temperatures were widespread. (The cold spell reached South Florida, although with less intensity than in other portions of the state, and did not affect the inhabited coastal areas of Miami-Dade County.)

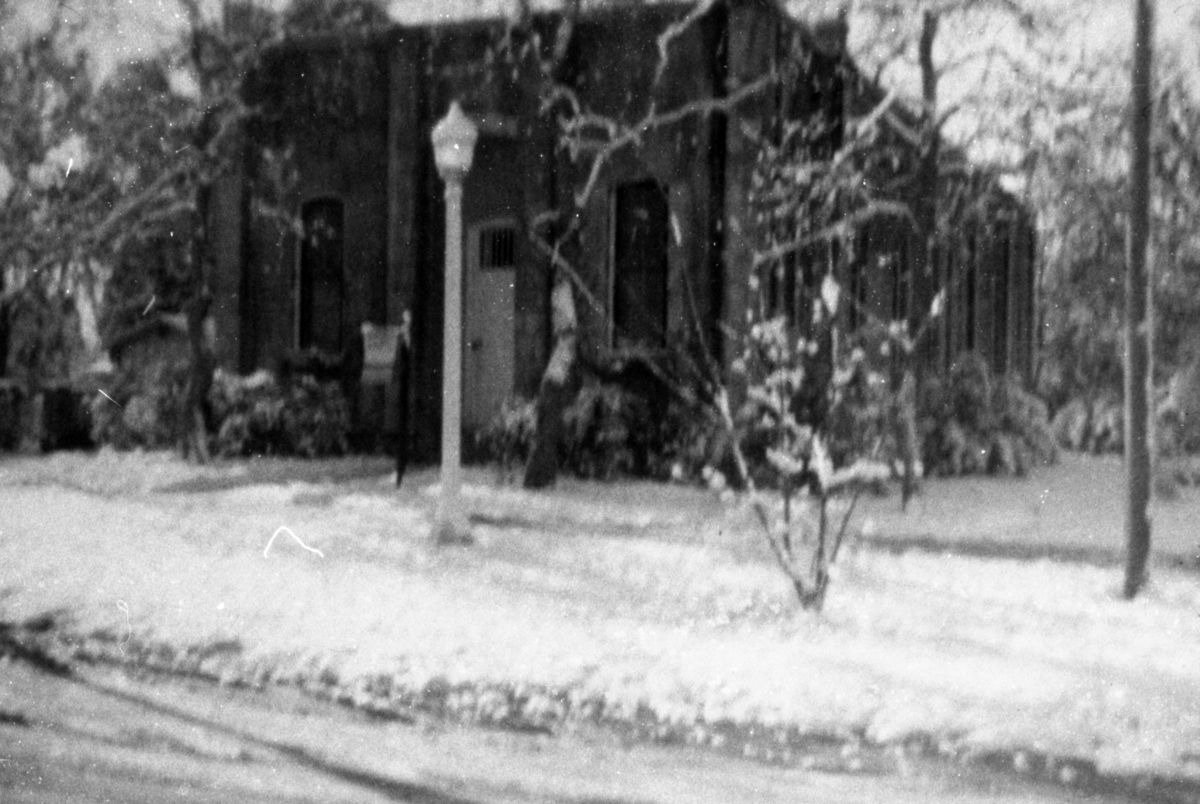
The old jail in Madison, Florida with the snow of February 13, 1958

- February 13, 1958: An overnight rainfall changed to snowfall in Jacksonville and accumulated 1.5 inches (3.8 cm). Tallahassee reported a record 2.8 inches (7.1 cm).
- February 9, 1973: Snow fell over the northern portion of the state, including a total of 2 inches (5.1 cm) in Pensacola, with unofficial reports of up to 8 inches (20.3 cm).
- January 18, 1977: The pressure gradient between a strong ridge over the Mississippi Valley and a Nor'easter over Atlantic Canada sent very cold temperatures southward into the state. Areas around Pensacola were the first to receive the snow, then the rest of the Panhandle. Pensacola accumulated 1 inch (2.5 cm) of snow. Following record accumulations for the Nature Coast, areas from Orlando to Tampa received light snow accumulations, between 0.2 and 0.5 inches (0.5 and 1.3 cm). Before sunrise on January 19, West Palm Beach reported snow flurries for the first and only time on record, reaching as far south as Homestead. The snow caused little impact as it was of the dry variety, melting on contact and lasting less than 40 minutes. Cold air resulted in hundreds of millions of dollars in damage to the winter citrus industry, and Orlando tied its 1899 record of more than six consecutive nights well below freezing. On January 20, The Miami Herald reported the event as its front-page story, with a headline of a size usually reserved for a declaration of war.
- January 30, 1977: Pensacola received a small amount of snow. Crestview, about 50 miles (80 km) inland from Pensacola, received 3 inches (7.6 cm) of snow.
- March 2, 1980: About 0.25 inches (0.6 cm) of snow covered car tops and patio furniture in Jacksonville.
- March 1, 1986: 0.5 inches (1.3 cm) of snow accumulated overnight in Jacksonville, then melted within 30 minutes in the morning sun.
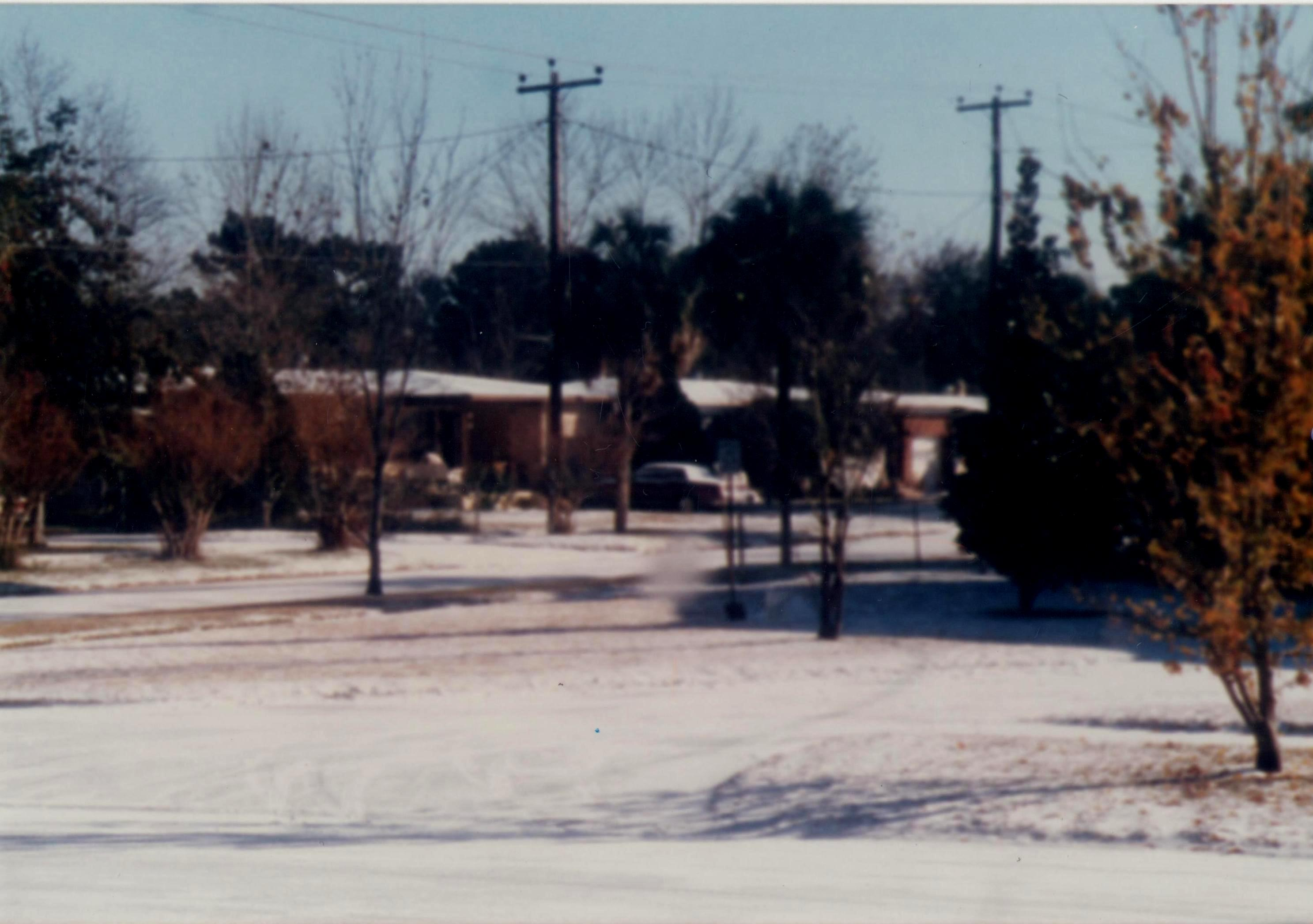
  Picture of the December 23, 1989, Jacksonville snowfall
- December 23–24, 1989: Light rain in North Florida, including Jacksonville and Gainesville, turned to freezing rain as temperatures dropped, and later changed to snow. The snow reached several inches in some locations, and resulted in the first White Christmas in the city's history. All Jacksonville bridges were closed except for the Acosta Bridge (at the time the oldest in the city before its replacement five years later). All interstates in the region of north Florida and south Georgia were closed, forcing many holiday travelers into local shelters.
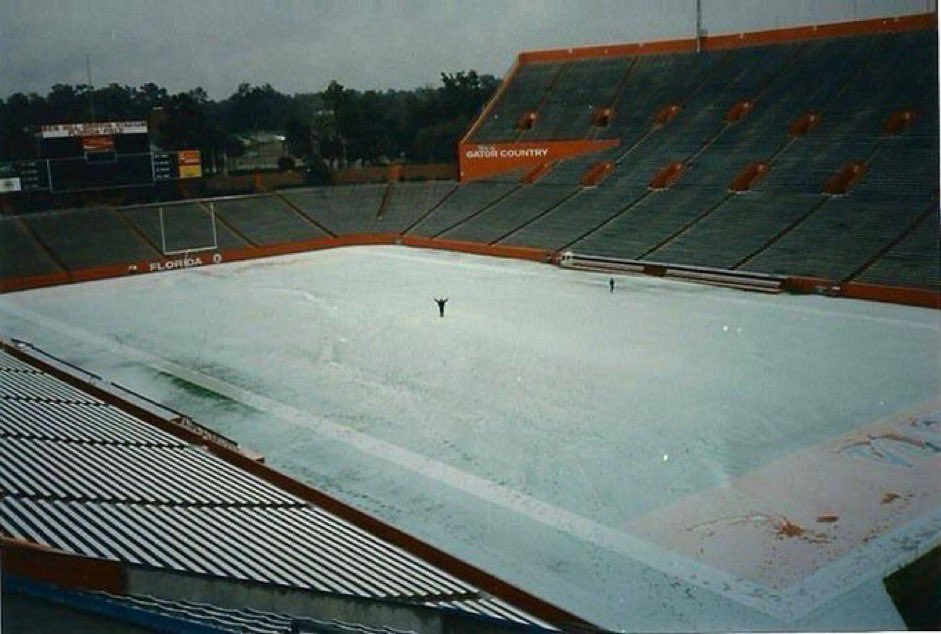
  Snowfall covers Florida Field in Gainesville, Florida on December 23, 1989
  Light snow fell across central Florida as far south as southern Pinellas County on the 23rd, though the official weather station in St. Petersburg experienced only light sleet.
- March 12, 1993: The 1993 Storm of the Century produced up to 4 inches (10.2 cm) of snow along the Florida Panhandle.
- February 2, 1994: Light snow was observed in the Florida Panhandle overnight from February 1 to 2.
- January 8, 1996: Snow flurries were reported from Crystal River to New Port Richey with no accumulation.
- December 18, 1996: A plume of cold air caused snow to form in the northwestern portion of Escambia County.

=== 21st century (32 reported events) ===
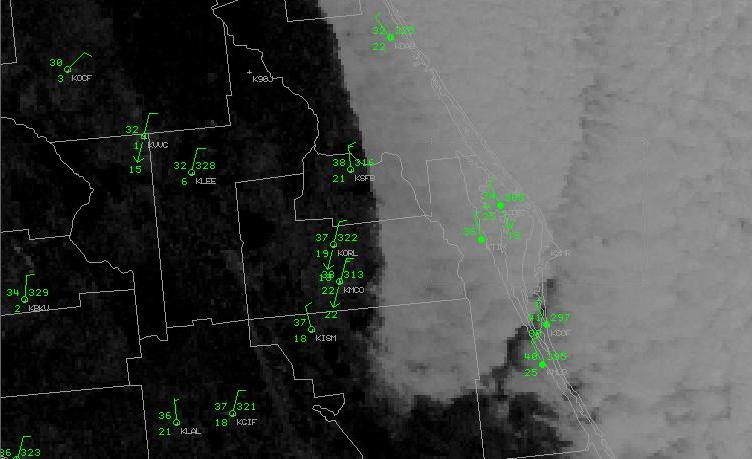
Satellite image for the January 24, 2003, snowfall

- January 24, 2003: A plume of Arctic air produced widespread record low temperatures and light snow flurries along the eastern coastline. The snow was described as ocean-effect snow, identical to lake effect snow in that it occurs when very cold air passes over relatively warm water. Snow flurries were reported as far south as Fort Pierce.
- December 25, 2004: Locations along the Florida Panhandle received a dusting of snow.
- November 21, 2006: An eastward-moving weather system produced a very light dusting and snowflakes in central Florida. This was the first November snow in the state since 1912.
- February 3, 2007: Very light snow flurries were reported in the northeastern panhandle, lasting less than an hour.
- January 3, 2008: Light snow flurries were reported near Daytona Beach.
- January 8–9, 2010: A very light dusting of snow was seen in the eastern Jacksonville area. Light snow also fell in parts of central Florida, which briefly accumulated in Ocala and other parts of Marion County. A "wintry mix" of sleet and freezing rain was widespread, with reports of light snow across central Florida from Tampa to Orlando to Melbourne.
- January 10, 2010: An Arctic cold front moved through south Florida on New Year's Day, beginning a period of record-setting cold temperatures. West Palm Beach, Naples and Moore Haven set records for their coldest 12-day stretch on record, with Fort Lauderdale and Miami not far behind. The coldest temperatures since 1989 were observed across most areas on January 10, which followed a day of rain with temperatures in the 30s and 40s °F (around 0–10 °C), as well as a few unconfirmed reports of sleet and snow.
- February 12, 2010: Portions of northwestern Florida experienced snowfall totals of around 1 inch (2.5 cm).
- February 14, 2010: 0.5 inches (1.3 cm) of snow fell across the northern halves of Escambia, Santa Rosa, Walton and Okaloosa Counties.
- December 8, 2010: Snow mixed with rain was reported in western parts of the panhandle, north of Pensacola.
- December 26, 2010: A mix of snow and sleet was reported in Jacksonville by the National Weather Service.
- December 28, 2010: Light snow was reported at Tampa Executive Airport in eastern Hillsborough County at 1:00 am and 5:00 am EDT, following a rare freezing fog event around midnight.
- January 9, 2011: Sleet was reported in the Pensacola area, as well as other places in Escambia and Santa Rosa counties. It did not accumulate.
- January 24–25, 2014: Sleet and light snow were reported in Escambia, Santa Rosa, and Okaloosa counties. Very light sleet was reported at a few locations around Jacksonville.
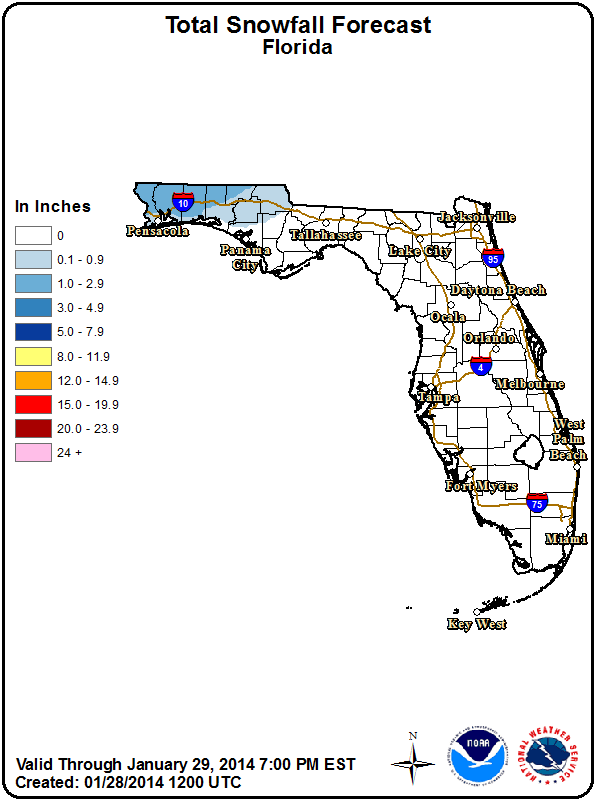
  Snowfall forecast for January 28–29, 2014, predicting over 1 inch of snow in Northwest Florida.
- January 28–29, 2014: A major winter storm event resulted in a mixture of freezing rain (with ice accumulation), sleet, and snow across most of the Panhandle between the afternoon of the 28th and the morning of the 29th. Due to dangerous ice accumulation, the Florida Highway Patrol and the Florida Department of Transportation closed several bridges in the Panhandle and advised against non-essential travel. Many state and local government offices closed around mid-day on the 28th. In Santa Rosa county, officials cautioned that ice-laden tree limbs were hanging low enough to hit vehicles. Between 1:00 pm and 9:30 pm on the 28th, 21,633 Gulf Power customers lost power at some point. At 2:00 pm EST on January 28, Pensacola was 31 °F (−1 °C) with freezing rain while Immokalee, near Fort Myers, was 86 °F (30 °C). Pensacola received 1.8 inches (4.6 cm) of snow on January 28. On January 29, the Florida Highway Patrol closed nearly 200 miles (320 km) of Interstate 10 from the Florida-Alabama state line to Gadsden County, directing resources and traffic to U.S. 90. Pensacola International Airport closed at 9:17 pm January 28 and was not scheduled to reopen until late on January 29.
- January 8, 2015: Snow flurries were reported in various locations around Jacksonville. The event was attributed to ocean-effect snow.
- January 22–23, 2016: Snow flurries were reported along the Florida Panhandle, as far east as the Jacksonville area, and as far south as the Gainesville area.
- January 6–7, 2017: Periods of light snow and wintry mix occurred in Escambia County around 9:00 pm on January 6 and ended just after midnight. No accumulation was reported.
- March 16, 2017: Snow flurries occurred in parts of the Florida Panhandle, including Tallahassee, for less than 1 hour starting at 3:53 am. There was no accumulation.
- December 8–9, 2017: Snow fell in various locations in the western Florida Panhandle. Northern Escambia County saw up to 2 inches (5.1 cm) of snow while Century saw 0.5 inches (1.3 cm) of snow. Snow flurries were reported in Destin and Miramar Beach.
- January 2–3, 2018: A winter storm resulted in snow and a wintry mix (freezing rain, sleet, and ice) across northern Florida from Tallahassee to the outskirts of Jacksonville and as far south as Gainesville, with temperatures in the 20s and dewpoints in the teens in the morning. A winter storm warning was in effect on the morning of January 3 for Nassau, Baker, Union, Columbia, Gilchrist, Suwanee, Hamilton, Lafayette, Madison, Taylor, Jefferson, and Leon Counties, prompting several school districts to cancel classes on January 3. Tallahassee received 0.1–0.2 inches (0.3–0.5 cm) of snow, which was the first measurable snowfall in the city since December 1989 (it sees flurries every few years). The Tallahassee snowfall followed a few hours of freezing rain. The Florida Highway Patrol closed Interstate 10 from Tallahassee to Madison for most of the morning of January 3, as well as several bridges in north-central Florida that had accumulated a dangerous amount of ice. Recorded ice accumulations included 0.25 inches (0.6 cm) in Hilliard and Lake City and 0.1 inches (0.3 cm) in Perry.
- January 17, 2018: A wintry mix of freezing rain and sleet, and some areas of snow were observed in portions of the Florida Panhandle. Snow fell in Crestview and DeFuniak Springs while freezing rain fell in Fort Walton Beach. Pensacola saw sleet which accumulated on grass and vehicles. The Bob Sikes Bridge to Pensacola Beach was closed due to ice.
- January 22, 2020: There were reports of graupel in the South Florida area spanning coastal Palm Beach and Broward Counties and the Treasure Coast through the afternoon into the evening hours. Cold air on top of the relatively warmer waters of the Atlantic Ocean created instability and some updrafts that sent water droplets higher up into the freezing part of the atmosphere. Those water droplets froze to become snowflakes high above the surface and, by accumulating frozen water droplets on their surface, became heavy enough to fall to the ground.
- February 16, 2021: Scattered light flurries were reported in Escambia County via mPing. No accumulation was reported.
- January 3, 2022: Light snow was reported in the early morning hours across Walton County in the Florida Panhandle.
- January 16, 2022: Light flurries were reported at 6:40 am CST in McDavid. Additional light snow flurries were reported throughout the morning in northern Escambia and Santa Rosa counties. Minor accumulations on grassy surfaces were reported in the far northern part of Escambia County.
- January 21, 2022: Light freezing rain and freezing drizzle occurred during the morning of January 21, 2022, across the northwestern Florida Panhandle. The National Weather Service in Mobile, Alabama issued a winter weather advisory the previous day to highlight this threat. Minimal impacts were observed.
- December 25, 2022: A historic winter storm produced a cold wave of Arctic air across the United States, resulting in sleet mid-morning on Christmas Day in the areas of Rockledge, Viera, and Merritt Island in northern Brevard County, Florida.
- January 16, 2024: An arctic cold front produced a wintry mix of snow flurries, sleet, and freezing drizzle during the mid-morning hours in far western portions of the Florida panhandle, including areas west of Pensacola. Minimal impacts occurred.

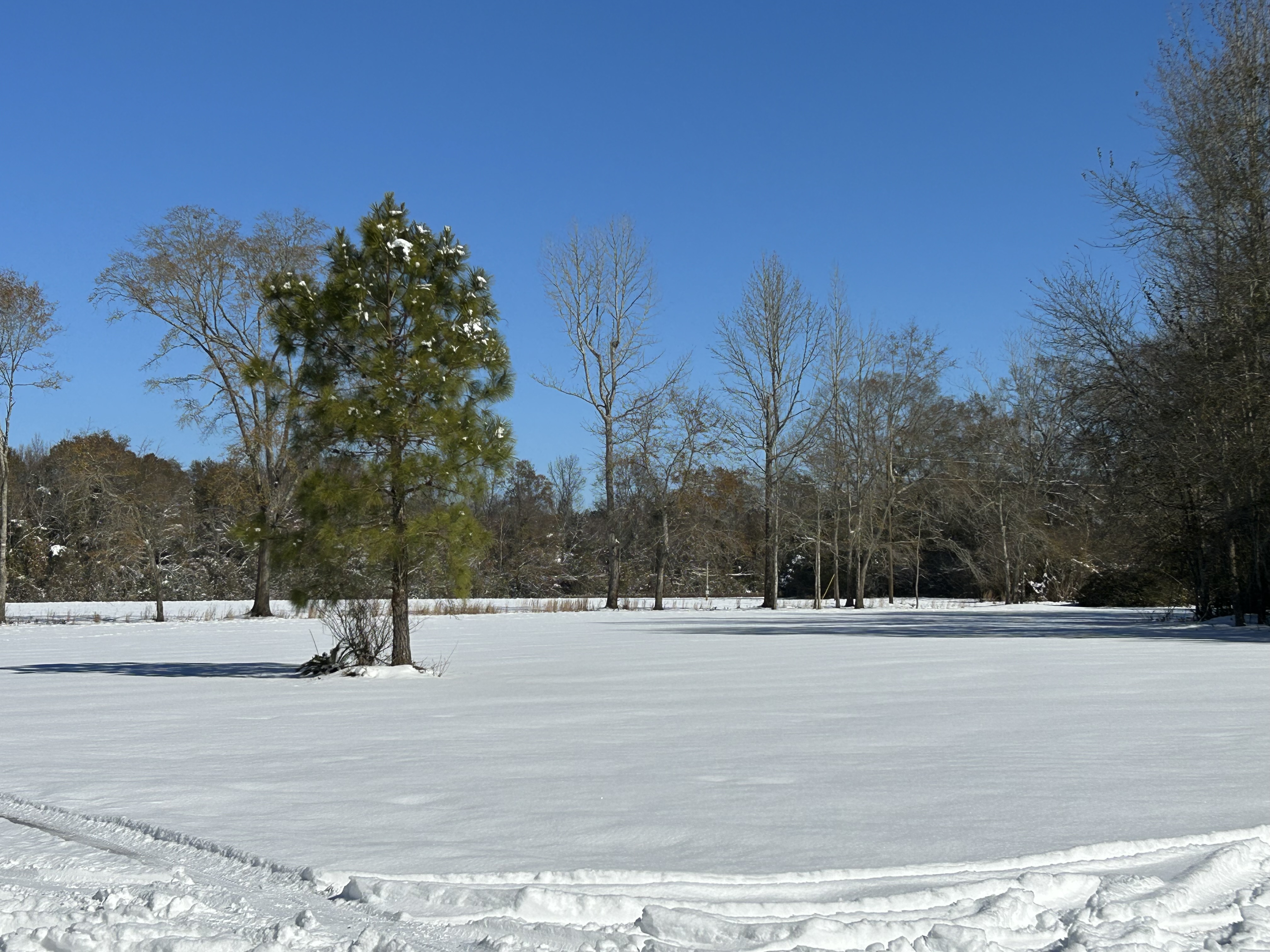
Snow in Century, Florida on January 22, 2025

- January 21–22, 2025: A major snowstorm hit the Gulf Coast, causing snow to fall in various areas along the panhandle of Florida. Near-blizzard conditions were noted along the Florida Panhandle Coast near Pensacola. Parts of the Florida panhandle saw 4–8 inches (10.2–20.3 cm) of snow, breaking the record for the most snow recorded in the state. A former National Weather Service employee recorded up to 10 inches (25.4 cm) of snow in Milton, while Pensacola International Airport recorded 8.9 inches (22.6 cm) of snow, doubling the record of the most snowfall ever recorded in the state; the previous record was set in 1954.
- January 18, 2026: Early in the morning hours on January 18, a band of locally heavy snow fell in the western and central Florida Panhandle as a winter storm system quickly moved through the area. At least light snow accumulations occurred over most parts of the Panhandle to the west of the Apalachicola River. The heaviest snowfall occurred over northern Walton, Holmes, and Jackson counties where Winter Storm Warnings or Advisories were issued, with 1.3 inches (3.3 cm) inches of snow being reported in Marianna. Areas of lighter accumulations between 0.2–0.7 inches (0.5–1.8 cm) were also reported further west in areas such as Pensacola and Milton. Impacts were relatively minor and short-lived as temperatures rose above freezing and clouds cleared, melting most snow within an hour or so after ending.
- January 31–February 1, 2026: An intense cold front resulted in light snow flurries across north central into northeastern Florida on the late morning and afternoon of January 31. Flurries were also reported on that evening and into the night across Central Florida near Tampa Bay and the Port St. Lucie area, with flurries confirmed in Sarasota, and further south in Cape Coral and Lehigh Acres. Snow in the air was recorded as far south as Naples.

== See also ==
- Climate of Florida
- Climate of the Tampa Bay area
- Great Blizzard of 1899
- Cold wave of January 1977
- 1993 Storm of the Century
- January 2018 North American blizzard
- Snow in Louisiana
- 2025 Gulf Coast blizzard
