= Snow in Louisiana =

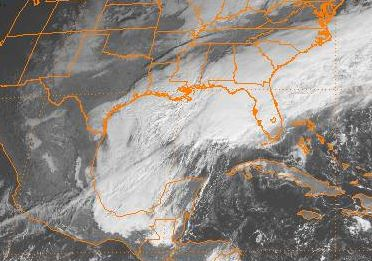
Southeast region snowfall on Christmas Day 2004

Snow in Louisiana is a relatively rare but not unheard of sight because of Louisiana's subtropical climate. For snow to push into Louisiana, extreme weather conditions for the area must be present, usually a low-pressure system coupled with unusually low temperatures. Average snowfall in Louisiana is approximately 0.2 inches (5.1 mm) per year, a low figure rivaled only by the states of Florida and Hawaii.

According to the National Weather Service, measurable snowfall amounts occur on an average of only once every other year in Northwest Louisiana; many consecutive years may pass with no measurable snowfall. The heaviest snowstorm ever recorded in the state was in Vermillion Parish, where 16 inches (410 mm) of snow fell in February 1895. In December 1929, 11 in (28 cm) of snow fell in the Shreveport area. This fell on December 21 and 22; half an inch remained on the ground on December 25 making this the only Christmas Day of record with snow on the ground. In 1948, 12.4 inches of snow was measured for the month of January for the greatest monthly amount on record. Occasional ice and sleet storms do considerable damage to trees, power and telephone lines, as well as make travel very difficult.

== Notable events ==
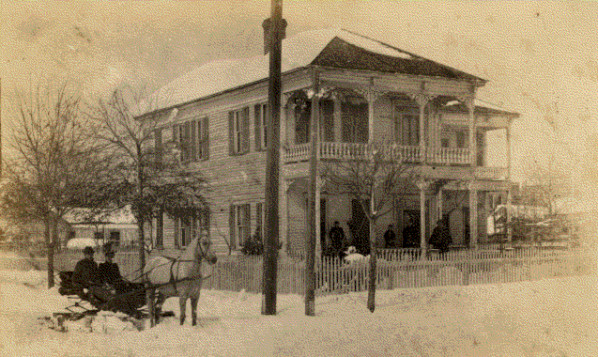
Lake Charles, Louisiana in 1895

1895: As part of the Great Freeze, large snow storm spanning from Texas to Alabama left New Orleans with approximately 8.2 inches (21 cm) of snow, Lake Charles with 22 inches (56 cm) of snow, and Rayne with 24 inches (61 cm) of snow. However, these are unconfirmed.

1899: With the Great Blizzard of 1899, snowfall in New Orleans reached 3.8 inches (9.7 cm) with strong winds and temperatures below 10 °F (−12 °C).

2000: This snow was nationally televised as the 2000 Independence Bowl was being played on December 31, 2000, in Shreveport. The game was later referred to as "The Snow Bowl", as a snowstorm (rare for the Shreveport area) began just before kickoff, blanketing the field in powder, and continued throughout the entire game.

2004: The 2004 Christmas Eve snowstorm swept across southern Texas and Louisiana, leaving unprecedented amounts of snow in areas that had not seen snow in 15 to 120 years.

2008: It snowed in and around semi-tropical New Orleans on December 11, 2008.

2014: The early 2014 North American cold wave that blew through the eastern portion of the continental United States produced record low temperatures and brought freezing snow and sleet to Louisiana.

2017: Early in the morning on December 8, 2017, a winter storm dripped snowflakes on much of south Louisiana. Throughout the day, more and more snow fell. Snow lasted all day long. Heavy snowfall fell on the ground, giving some places a height of 6 inches (15 cm) of snow. Most schools across Louisiana closed due to the snow.

2021: Significant snow and ice was reported nearly statewide on February 14–15, 2021, with the February 13–17, 2021, North American winter storm and again on February 17 from the February 15–20, 2021, North American winter storm.

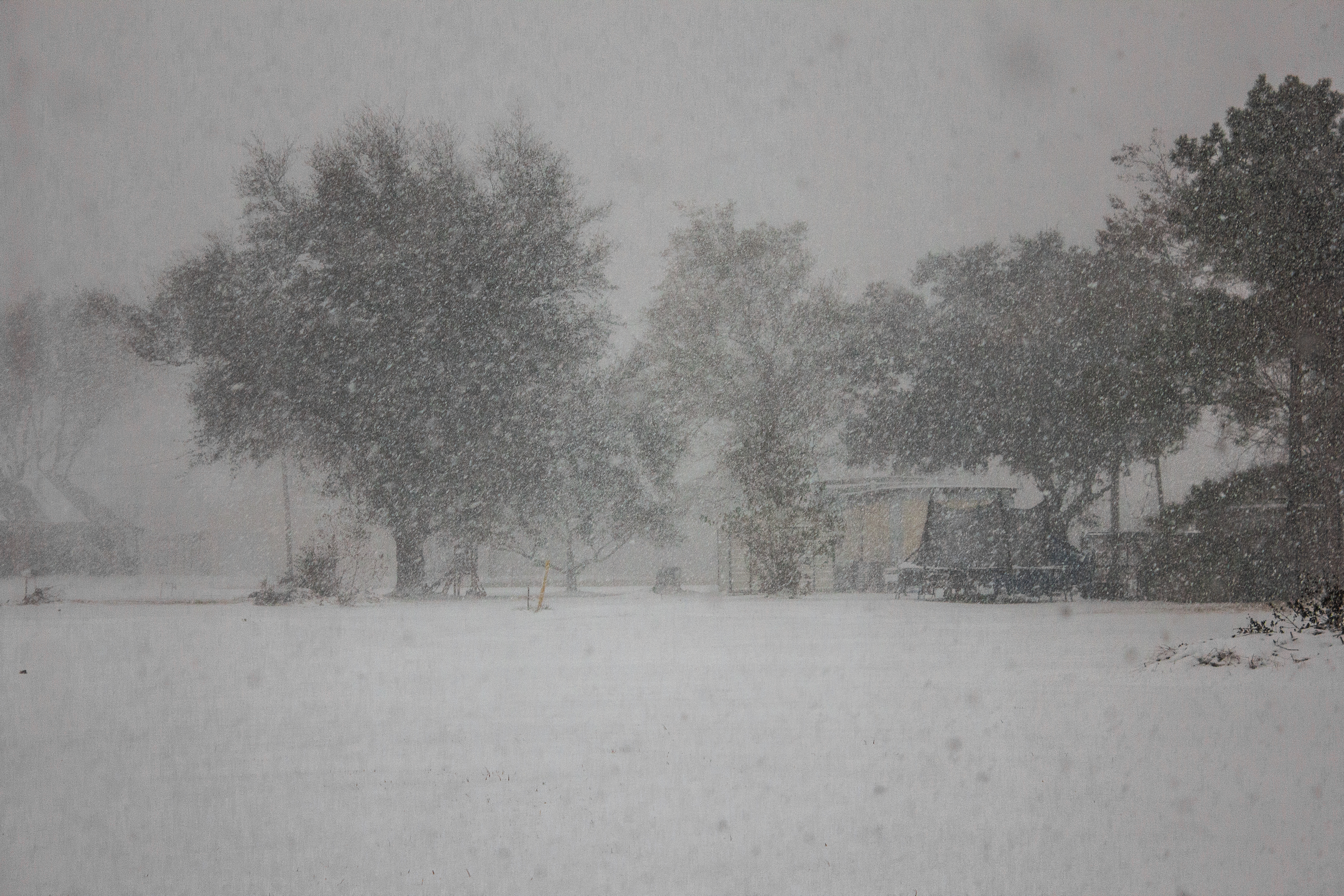
Blizzard conditions in Carlyss, Louisiana on January 21, 2025

2025: The 2025 Gulf Coast blizzard swept through Louisiana on January 21, producing snow and ice throughout much of the state. Snowfall totaled 11.5 in (290 mm) near Chalmette, and 10 in (250 mm) in nearby New Orleans. Snowfall totaled 13.4 in (34 cm) in Grand Coteau, the highest recorded in the state during the blizzard. Schools across the state closed, and a Blizzard Warning was issued for the first time in Louisiana's history due to the heavy snowfall and winds exceeding 35 mph (56 km/h).

== State preparedness ==
Because of the scarcity of freezing temperatures in Louisiana, many citizens of the region are often left unprepared to handle what might be considered a storm of little consequence in more northern states. The region has developed a system of road and school closures with only minimal snowfall, as most drivers in the area are unprepared to deal with slick, frozen roads. In 2014, Gov. Bobby Jindal invoked the Louisiana Homeland Security and Emergency Assistance and Disaster Act in advance of the weather and assembled teams to assist in preparation and recovery.

== Louisiana's environment ==
The state's typically humid subtropical climate rarely encounters precipitation coupled with freezing temperatures. The low latitudes and proximity to the Gulf of Mexico helps maintain this climate, particularly closer to the coast. The normally extreme summers are rarely countered by cold winters, with snowfall low in intensity and frequency. Also the southern portions of the state typically has two seasons, a wet season from April to October and a dry season from November to March. The cooler season typically brings in very little precipitation, also limiting snowfall. Average winter temperature normals in southern Louisiana vary from the 40s to the 60s Fahrenheit. Natural disasters such as hurricanes are far more common, and such an ecosystem is ill-prepared for snow, particularly the seafood supply on which Louisiana relies for much of its revenue. Little research has been done directly linking effects on Louisiana's ecosystem to snow conditions. However, the jet stream that created the 2014 North American cold wave has been linked to global warming, and resultant cold fronts have been linked to salt water intrusion in Louisiana's Atchafalaya Bay. However, one of Louisiana's most famous animals, the alligator, has proved versatile in adapting to cold weather conditions by burrowing in "alligator holes", which they usually use for waiting out a drought.

== See also ==
- Snow in Florida
