= Cold wave of January 1977 =

Weather event

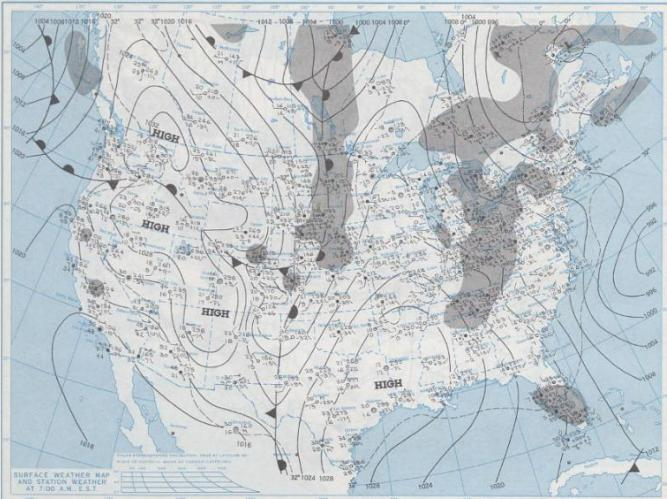
- A weather map on January 19, 1977 showing the high-pressure system impacting Florida

Meteorological history
- Formed: January 16, 1977
- Dissipated: January 21, 1977

Cold wave
- Maximum snowfall or ice accretion: 2 inches (51 mm) along Interstate 4 between Tampa and Orlando

Overall effects
- Fatalities: 1 indirect
- Damage: $2 billion (1977 US$)
- Areas affected: Florida, The Bahamas

The cold wave of January 1977 produced the only known trace of snow in the greater Miami area of Florida ever reported. It occurred following the passage of a strong cold front, in combination with a high-pressure area situated over the Mississippi River Valley. As a result, cold air moved far to the south across Florida, causing both snow flurries and record low temperatures. Most notably, the weather system brought snow flurries (seen in the air, but not on the ground) as far south as Homestead on January 19. No snow had ever been reported in southeastern Florida before or since. Damage was most significant to agriculture, as major losses occurred to citrus fruits and tender vegetables. Statewide, agricultural damage from the cold wave totaled to $350 million (equivalent to $1.86 billion in 2025), and losses overall totaled to $2 billion (equivalent to $10.6 billion in 2025). One fatality occurred due to an automobile accident in Central Florida, which was related to the cold wave.

== Meteorological history ==
Beginning on January 16, a strong arctic cold front began crossing the state of Florida. Two days later, another cold front crossed Florida, while a strong arctic high-pressure system over the Mississippi River Valley also began pushing cold air into Florida. Simultaneously, an upper-level trough associated with the second cold front contained a band of clouds and precipitation. Between 8 and 9:30 am, snow flurries were reported in several areas outside Miami. The National Weather Service office in Miami reported that an observation at nearby Lake Worth reported a trace of snow on the ground at the 9:00 am observation (it was gone by the 10:00 am observation). This was the source of the trace of snow at Miami in 1977.

It was reported that people stopped their cars and emerged from their homes to see the snow in great numbers, many having never seen snow flurries in their lifetimes. That day the high only reached 47 °F (8 °C) in Miami. The associated cold air began to subside on January 21.

== Impact ==
=== Florida ===
Flurries were seen in the air and on the ground a trace was reported at both Tampa and Plant City. West Palm Beach reported flurries in the air at 11:10 UTC (6:10 a.m. EST) on January 19, and lasted for 1 hour and 50 minutes, ending at 13:00 UTC (8 a.m. EST). Simultaneously, snow flurries began falling in Broward and Dade counties; it was the first time snow had ever been observed at Miami. At Homestead, a mix of light rain and wet snow flurries fell briefly at the Homestead Air Force Base, and is regarded as the southernmost location of snowfall in the Contiguous United States. Prior to this event, the southernmost snow record for Florida was in Fort Myers in February 1899. Additionally, wet snow flurries were reported at Freeport, Bahamas, on Grand Bahama, making the only known snowfall in the history of The Bahamas.

Across the state, record low temperatures were reported. For much of the state, temperatures remained below freezing for 10–14 hours, and at or less than 28 °F (−2 °C) for at least four hours. In Pensacola, a temperature of 10 °F (−12 °C) was recorded, and was later surpassed by a mere 5 °F (−15 °C) during the Winter 1985 Arctic outbreak. A record low temperature of 20 °F (−7 °C) was reported in Orlando. Few other records were broken in North and Central Florida. In the Tampa Bay Area, temperatures hovered around the upper 20s (~-2°C). South of Tampa, record temperatures included 20 °F (−7 °C) in Devils Garden, 28 °F (−2 °C) in Fort Lauderdale, 19 °F (−7 °C) in LaBelle, and 32 °F (0 °C) in Miami Beach. Other cold but not record-breaking temperatures included 24 °F (−4 °C) in Belle Glade, 28 °F (−2 °C) in Hollywood, 23 °F (−5 °C) at the Homestead Agricultural Center, 24 °F (−4 °C) in Immokalee, 31 °F (−1 °C) at the Miami International Airport, 25 °F (−4 °C) in Moore Haven, 26 °F (−3 °C) in Naples, and 25 °F (−4 °C) in North Miami Beach, and 27 °F (−3 °C) in West Palm Beach. (Note: Although Storm Data and National Weather Service Miami, Florida, described the 27 °F (−3 °C) temperature reading as the lowest ever recorded in West Palm Beach, the city observed a temperature of 24 °F (−4 °C) on December 29, 1894, as part of the Great Freeze.) Additionally, temperatures in the 40s°F (4-9°C) were reported in the Florida Keys for several hours.

In combination with snow and abnormally low temperatures, a severe freeze ensued, causing extensive damage, especially to agriculture. The USDA reported the following crop losses: 35% to citrus, at least 95% to vegetables, between 50 and 75% of commercial flowers, 50% to permanent pasture lands, and 40% to sugar cane. Crop damage totaled to $350 million (1977 USD), while at least $100 million (1977 USD) of that figure occurred in Dade County alone. In order to prevent water pipes from freezing, nurseries and farms ran sprinklers all night. However, some water began flowing onto roadways, and with freezing temperatures, caused ice to form on roads in western Dade County. Overall, the cold wave caused up to $2 billion (1977 USD) in damage. Several traffic accidents occurred due to snowfall and ice. Most notably, there was a ten-car pileup in Tampa, and another accident killed a man near Auburndale, when his car skidded in snow and crashed into a truck. Due to significant losses related to the freezing temperatures, then-President Jimmy Carter, who was inaugurated on January 20, designated 35 counties in Florida disaster areas.

The cold killed 96% of shallow-water branching coral at Dry Tortugas National Park.

=== The South ===
Areas of the eastern United States outside of Florida were also affected by the cold wave. In Georgia, the temperature fell to 1 °F (−17 °C) in Atlanta on January 17. Overall, the mean low temperature in the city during the month of January was 21 °F (−6 °C), well below the average of 34 °F (1 °C).

In Tennessee, the Public Service Commission estimating that approximately 100,000 people would be forced to miss a day of work due to closures, while nearly 2,000 people in southern West Virginia were left without heat as a result of interruption of natural gas service.

Every day of January 1977 was below average in Raleigh, North Carolina, and the city experienced its coldest winter on record, with January being 14.4 °F (8.0 °C) below average. The temperature stayed below freezing from the night of January 16 until January 20, and the temperature fell below 0 °F (−18 °C) for one of the few times in the city's history.

=== Midwest ===
January 1977 is the coldest month on record in the state of Ohio, with an average temperature of 11.9 °F (−11.2 °C). Snowfall was above average throughout the month and the all-time record low of −25 °F (−32 °C) was set in Cincinnati. The Ohio River froze solid for the first time since 1918, halting commercial shipping for weeks. Some parts of northern Ohio stayed below freezing for the entire month. Temperatures did not rise above freezing the entire month in a swath from eastern Iowa to western Pennsylvania northward.

The cold wave was named the top story of 1977 in the Associated Press's annual poll of the year's biggest news stories.

== See also ==
- List of snow events in Florida
- Blizzard of 1977
