= 2025 Gulf Coast blizzard =

Strong winter storm that impacted the Gulf Coast of the United States

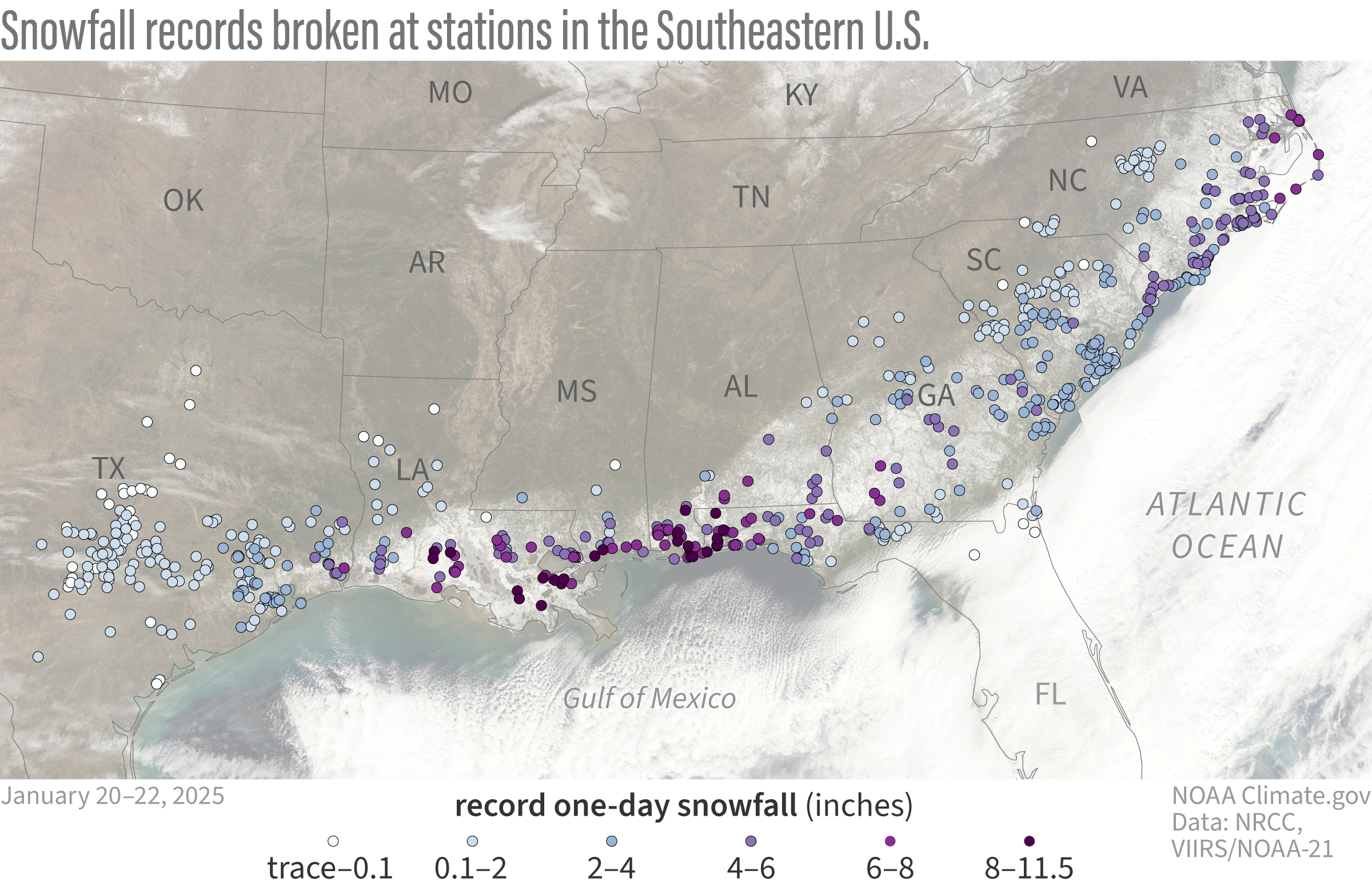
- Composite of snowfall reports and satellite view of the Gulf Coast after the blizzard on January 22

Meteorological history
- Formed: January 20, 2025
- Exited land: January 22, 2025
- Dissipated: January 27, 2025

Category 1 "Notable" blizzard
- Regional snowfall index: 2.93 (NOAA)
- Lowest pressure: 939 mbar (hPa); 27.73 inHg (see Storm Éowyn)
- Max. snowfall: Snowfall – 13.4 in (34 cm) near Grand Coteau, Louisiana; Ice – 0.25 in (6.4 mm) in Hebbronville, Texas

Overall effects
- Fatalities: 13
- Damage: $200 million (2025 USD)
- Areas affected: U.S. Gulf Coast, Southeast
- Power outages: >77,000
- Part of the 2024–25 North American winter

The 2025 Gulf Coast blizzard, also unofficially referred to as Winter Storm Enzo by The Weather Channel and media outlets, was a rare and unusually strong winter storm and blizzard impacting much of the Gulf Coast of the United States between January 20 and January 22, 2025. It brought snowfall to regions of the Gulf Coast that rarely receive wintry precipitation. This was the first recorded blizzard on the Gulf Coast and the most significant winter storm in the region since 1895. The storm originated from an area of low pressure that developed in the western Gulf of Mexico along an Arctic cold front on January 20. It moved eastward and dropped large amounts of winter precipitation along the coastlines before it moved offshore on January 22. The storm later evolved into Storm Éowyn in the northeastern Atlantic.

Due to the threat of heavy snowfall in cities such as New Orleans, Houston, and Pensacola, states of emergency were declared in almost every state along the Gulf Coast. During the height of the storm on January 21, a blizzard warning was issued for parts of Southwestern Louisiana into Southeastern Texas, becoming the southernmost warning in modern records. Thousands of scheduled airline flights were postponed or cancelled across the Gulf Coast due to the storm. Snow accumulations ranged from 6–12 inches (15–30 cm) across most of the Gulf Coast region to the north and west of the Florida Peninsula. The states of Louisiana and Florida recorded their largest single-day snowfall accumulations, breaking records that had stood for almost a century. At least 77,000 people lost power due to the storm, with most of the outages being reported in Louisiana and Florida. At least 13 people died as a result of the storm, and financial losses were estimated to be at least US$200 million.

== Meteorological history ==
Map plotting the storm's track and intensity, according to the Saffir–Simpson scale Map key Saffir–Simpson scale Tropical depression (≤38 mph, ≤62 km/h) Tropical storm (39–73 mph, 63–118 km/h) Category 1 (74–95 mph, 119–153 km/h) Category 2 (96–110 mph, 154–177 km/h) Category 3 (111–129 mph, 178–208 km/h) Category 4 (130–156 mph, 209–251 km/h) Category 5 (≥157 mph, ≥252 km/h) Unknown Storm type Tropical cyclone Subtropical cyclone Extratropical cyclone, remnant low, tropical disturbance, or monsoon depression

Early on January 21, a low pressure area was located in the western Gulf of Mexico, connected to a cold front. Fueled by an Arctic cold front moving through the southern United States, the low produced an area of snowfall, sleet, and freezing rain across the U.S. Gulf Coast from Texas to Florida. The Weather Prediction Center described it as an "impactful, rare winter storm".

The remnants of the blizzard subsequently crossed the Atlantic Ocean and developed into Storm Éowyn, which brought historic impacts to Ireland, Isle of Man and the United Kingdom and mildly affected western Norway.

== Preparations and impact ==
Warnings issued by NWS Lake Charles due to the storm
Blizzard Warning
Winter Storm Warning
Winter Weather Advisory
Freeze Warning
Gale Warning
Small Craft Advisory

=== Texas ===
Ahead of the storm, state agencies mobilized resources in advance of the winter weather. Airports near Houston, Texas, halted their flights on January 19 due to the storm. The Electric Reliability Council of Texas said they had made preparations in order to avoid a situation similar to the 2021 crisis. Houston mayor John Whitmire said crews had begun pre-treating roadways ahead of the storm.

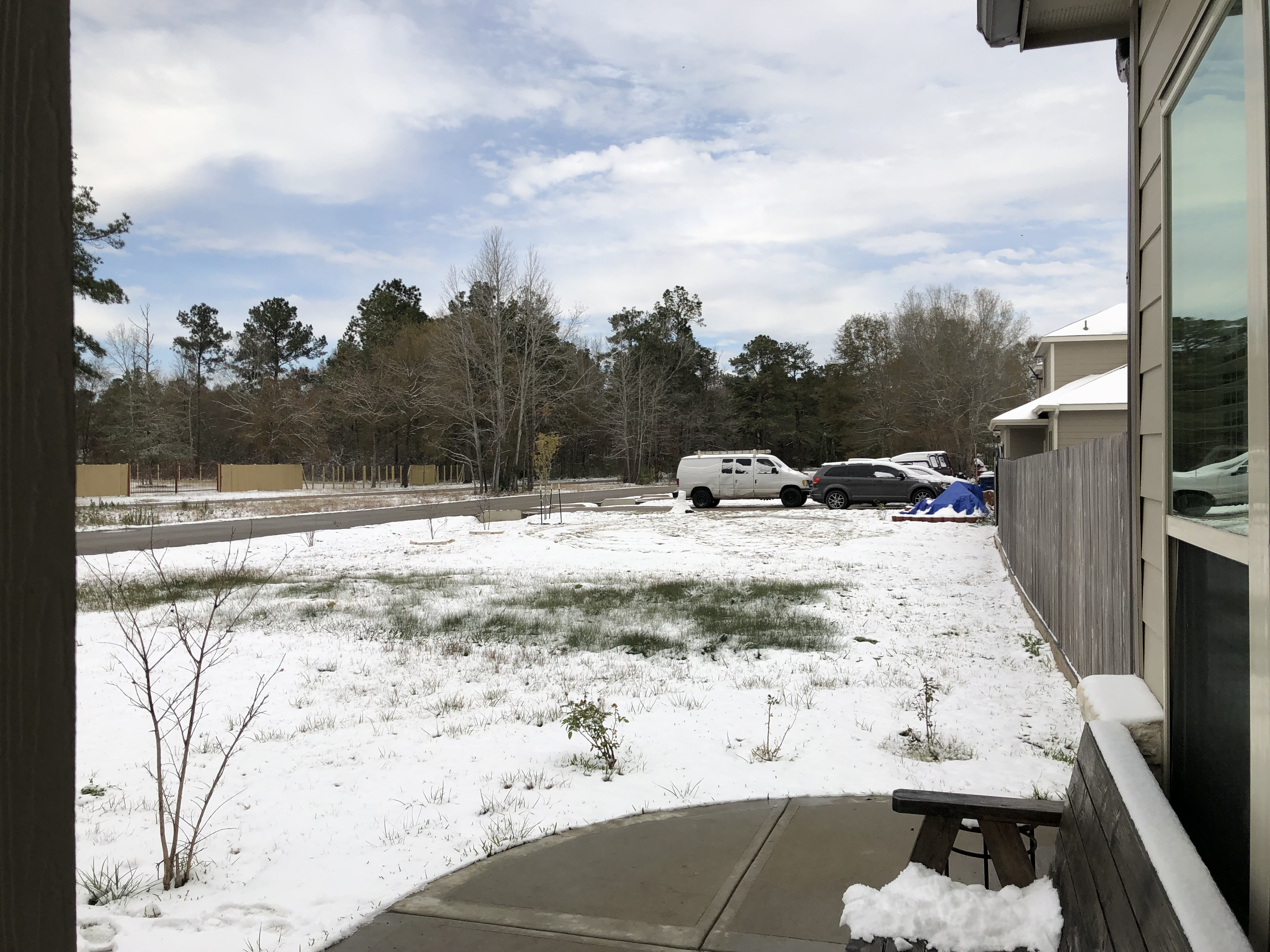
Snow in eastern New Caney, Texas, at 12 p.m. on January 21

Freezing rain and snow took place in the Houston area which had started on the evening of January 20 and continued into January 21, with up to 6 inches (15 cm) of snow falling near La Porte and up to 0.18 inches (4.6 mm) of freezing rain falling near League City. "Multiple" people died in a multi-car pileup in southwestern Texas. Space Center Houston was closed during the storm, and all tours on the ground were cancelled. Many major roadways in Houston had snow and ice accumulation on them by early morning on January 21, which led to dozens of road closures. Two more people died, one in a crash on January 19 in Harris County after her car collided head-on with a tractor trailer and a homeless man was found dead the following morning in Katy. An estimated 1,100 people stayed at county-run shelters during the winter storm. The majority of flights from Houston airports were cancelled, rendering them unavailable. Beaumont set an all-time monthly record low of 11 °F (−11.7 °C) for January. The National Weather Service Lake Charles, Louisiana also issued a blizzard warning for Orange and Jefferson Counties including the cities of Beaumont, Orange and Port Arthur.

=== Louisiana ===
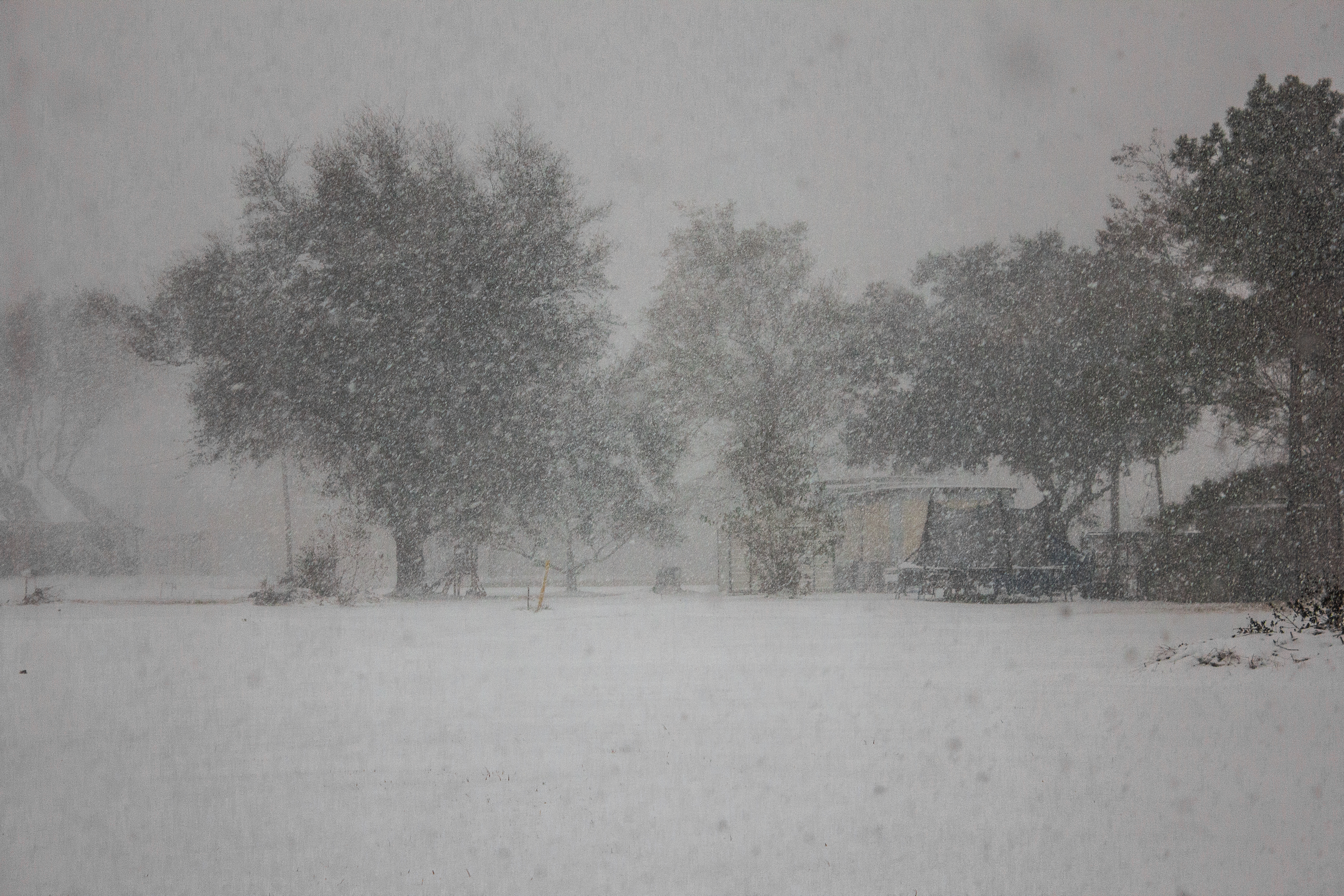
Blizzard conditions in Carlyss, Louisiana, on January 21

For the first time on record, the National Weather Service issued a blizzard warning for parts of southwestern Louisiana, covering Vermillion, Jefferson Davis, Acadia, Cameron, Lafayette and Calcasieu parishes, due to heavy snowfall and winds exceeding 35 mph (56 km/h). Snowfall totaled 13.4 in (34.0 cm) near Grand Coteau, the highest total recorded from the storm. Elsewhere, snowfall totaled 11.5 in (29.2 cm) near Chalmette, and nearby, New Orleans recorded up to 10 in (25.4 cm), Baton Rouge recorded 7.6 in (19.3 cm) of snowfall, beating the one day snowfall record from February 1895 at 6.5 in (16.5 cm). New record low temperatures were set in Jennings, New Roads, Lafayette, and New Iberia at 7 °F (−13.9 °C), 4 °F (−15.6 °C), 4 °F (−15.6 °C) and 2 °F (−16.7 °C) respectively. Baton Rouge and Lake Charles also set a monthly all-time record low of 7 °F (−13.9 °C) and 6 °F (−14.4 °C) for January respectively.

The heavy snowfall and icy conditions led to the closure of major highways, including I-10, causing significant disruptions to transportation. Most flights in and out of Louis Armstrong New Orleans Airport were cancelled as well. The game between the New Orleans Pelicans and Milwaukee Bucks on January 22 at Smoothie King Center was postponed. The snow and ice caused disruptions in education as schools around the state were closed for up to 4 days.

=== Mississippi ===
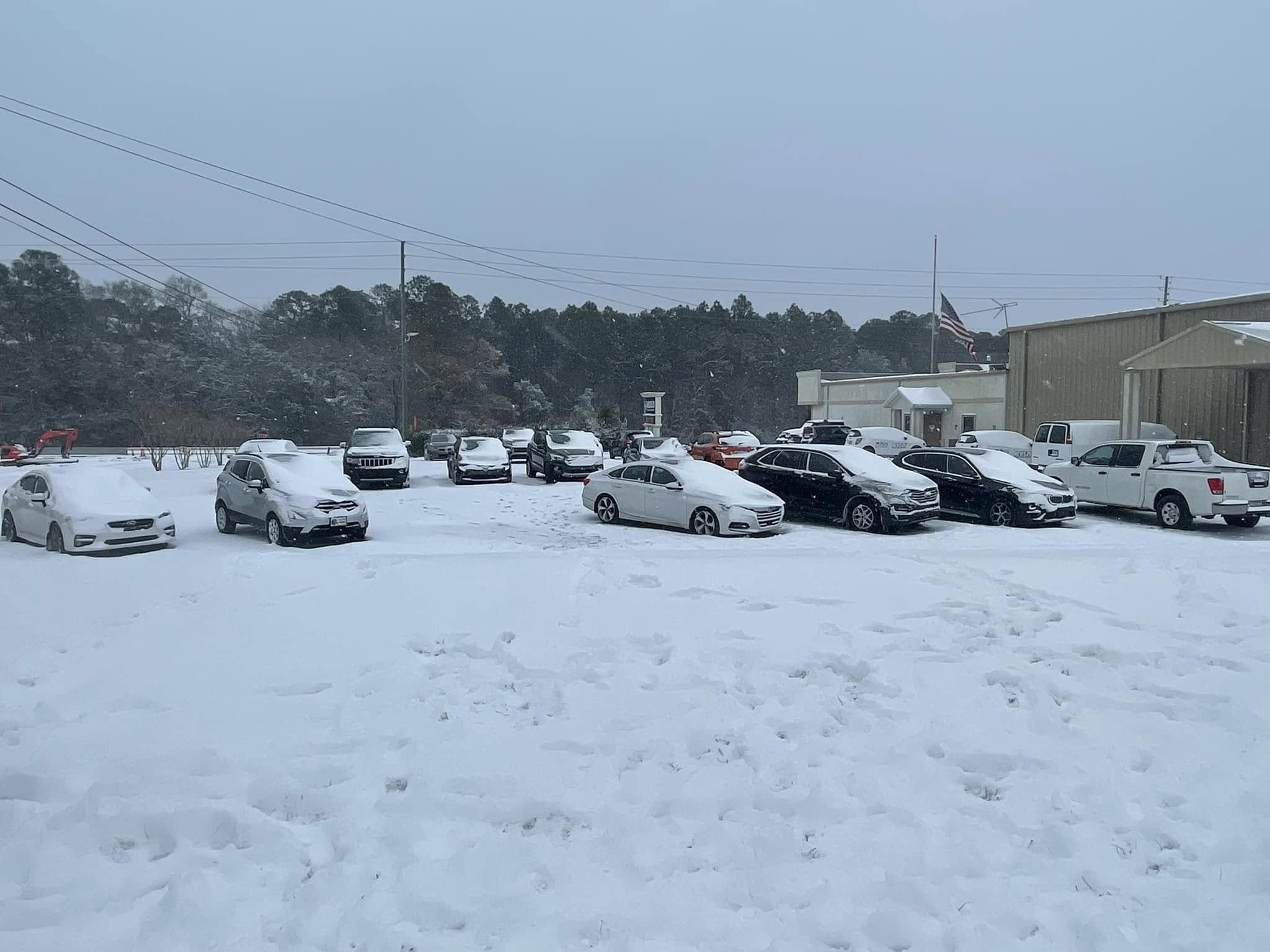
Snow seen in Gulfport, Mississippi

Governor Tate Reeves declared a state of emergency for the state on January 19, instructing all state agencies to implement emergency plans. Cold weather shelters opened across the coast for those needing to get out of the weather.

Gulfport-Biloxi International Airport was closed due to the snow on January 21. Up to 9 in (23 cm) of snow fell in Ocean Springs, which would break the Jackson County record if verified. Bridges across the Gulf Coast closed due to the weather, the bridges reopening by January 22. Schools across the coast remained closed throughout the week, giving students the entire week off.

=== Alabama ===
In Bradley, 11.8 in (29.7 cm) was measured, while Mobile Regional Airport recorded 7.5 in (19 cm) of snowfall. This broke the record in the latter city of 6 in (15 cm) set in February 1895. In Mobile, the under-demolition Mobile Civic Center collapsed from the weight of the snow.

=== Georgia ===
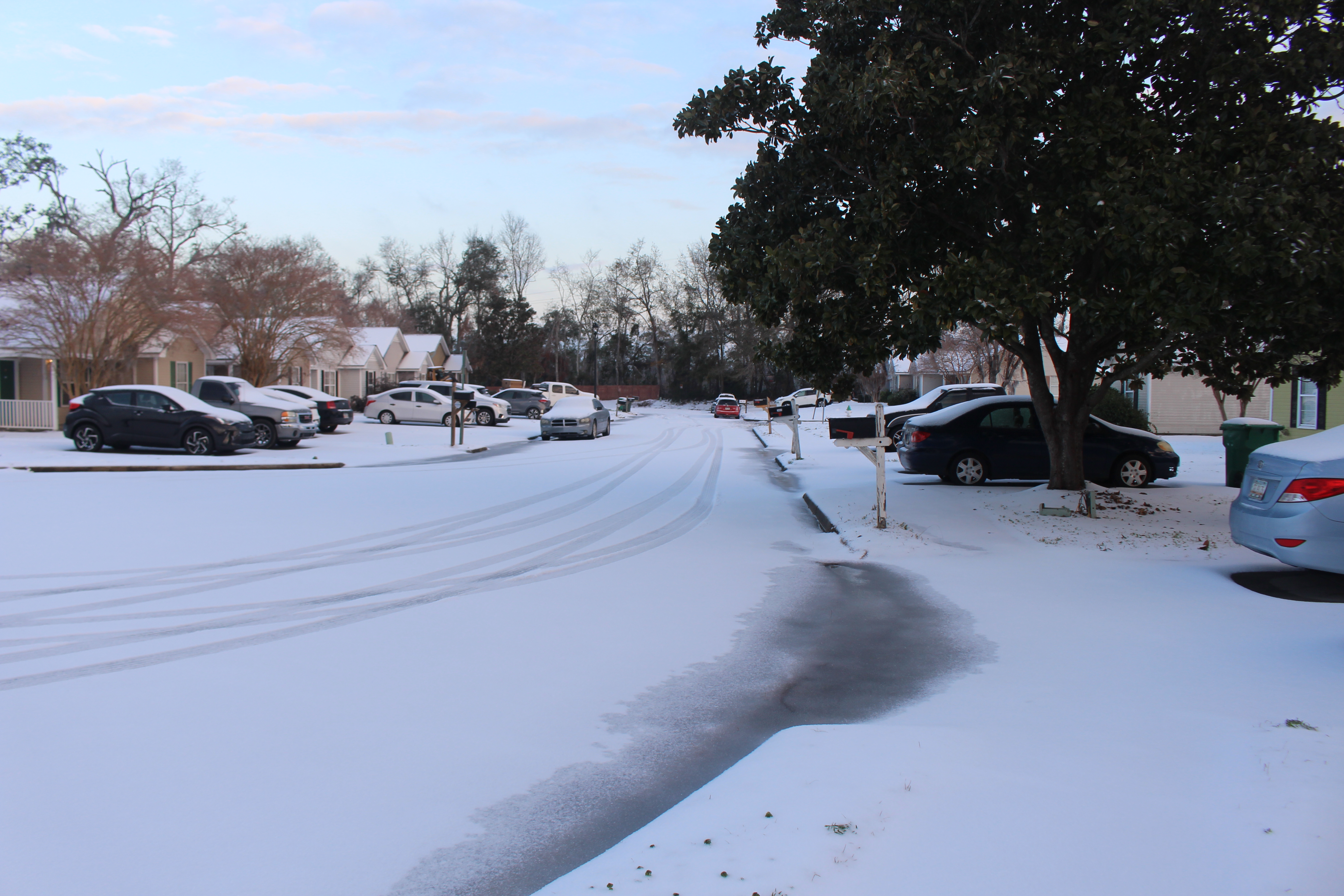
Snowfall in Valdosta, Georgia, on January 22

Governor Brian Kemp warned on January 21 that the storm could wreak "havoc" on the city of Atlanta due to its unpredictable nature and shifting more north than initially projected. Many schools across the state closed early in advance of the storm. One death has been reported due to cold temperatures. Atlanta recorded 1.1 in (2.8 cm) of snow, marking its second 1 inch+ snowfall in less than 2 weeks after nearly seven years without receiving an inch of snow, also making this a top 10 snowiest January on record. Areas north and west of the city received little to no precipitation and thus no impacts, while areas of the city, DeKalb, Gwinnett, South Fulton and Clayton counties had major traffic jams and hundreds of cars stranded on iced over streets. The previous winter weather advisory was upgraded to a winter storm warning as snow was falling, and Hartsfield-Jackson International Airport was placed on a ground stop.

Middle and Southern Georgia reported even higher amounts of snow, amounting to over 6 inches at times. The snowfall totals are displayed in the table below, sourced from NWS:

Snowfall Totals in Georgia
City	Snow Total
Albany	7.5 in
Americus	5.5 in
Hawkinsville	5.0 in
Homerville	4.0 in
Warner Robins	3.5 in
Columbus	3.0 in
Macon	3.0 in
Valdosta	2.2 in
Atlanta	1.1 in
Savannah	1.1 in

=== Florida ===
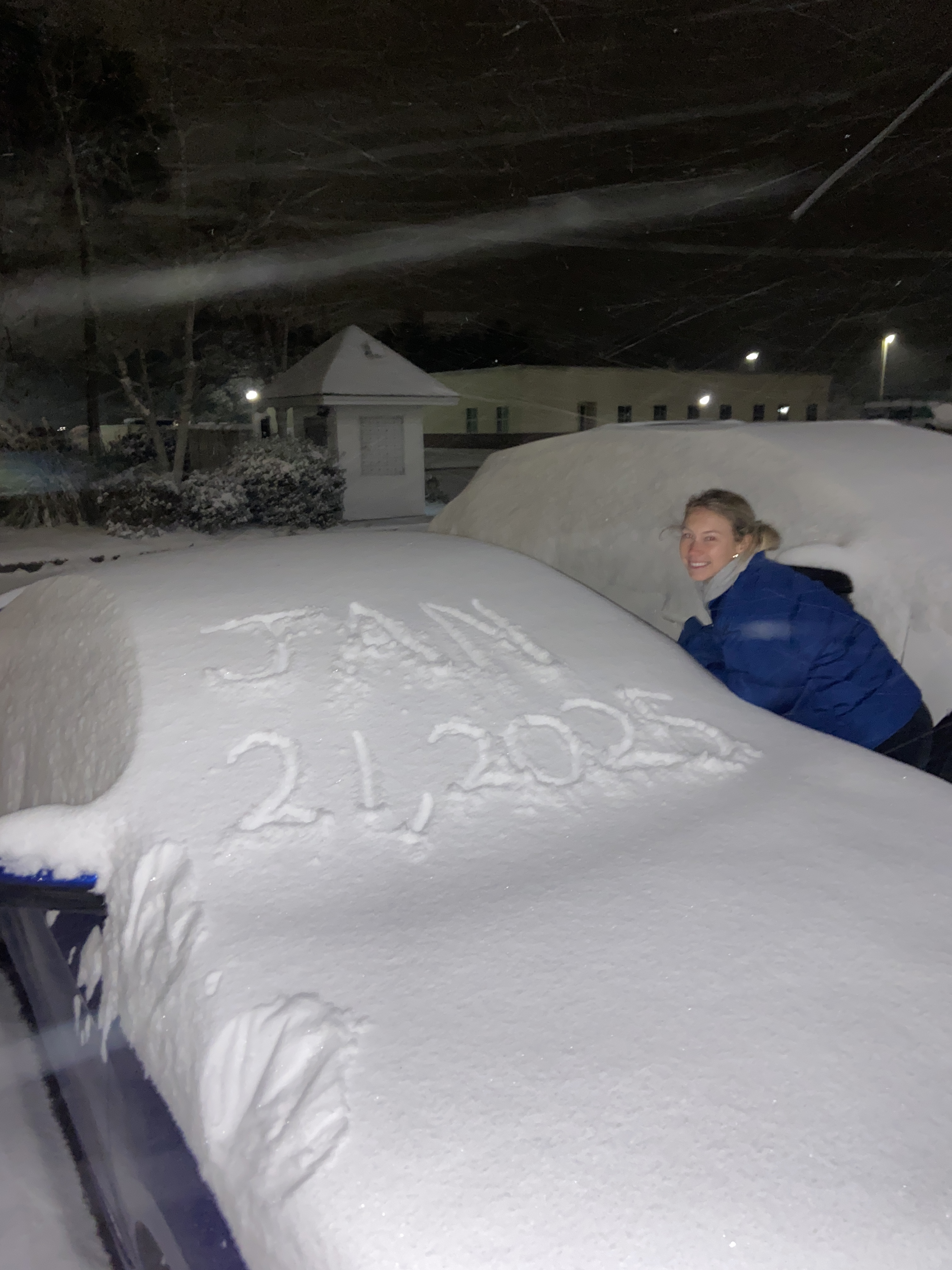
A resident next to a snow-covered car in Niceville, Florida

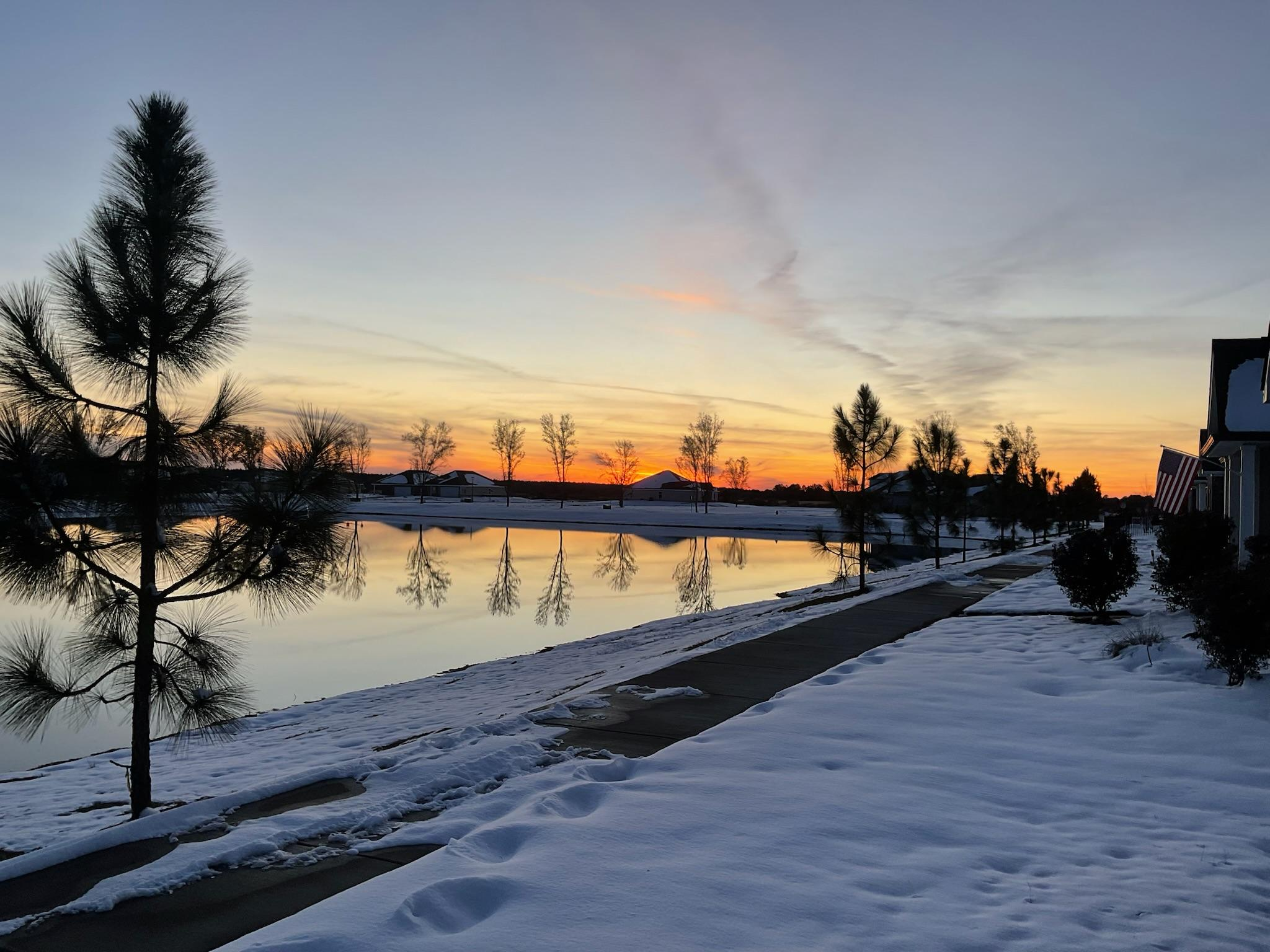
Snow with a sunset in Milton, Florida on January 22.

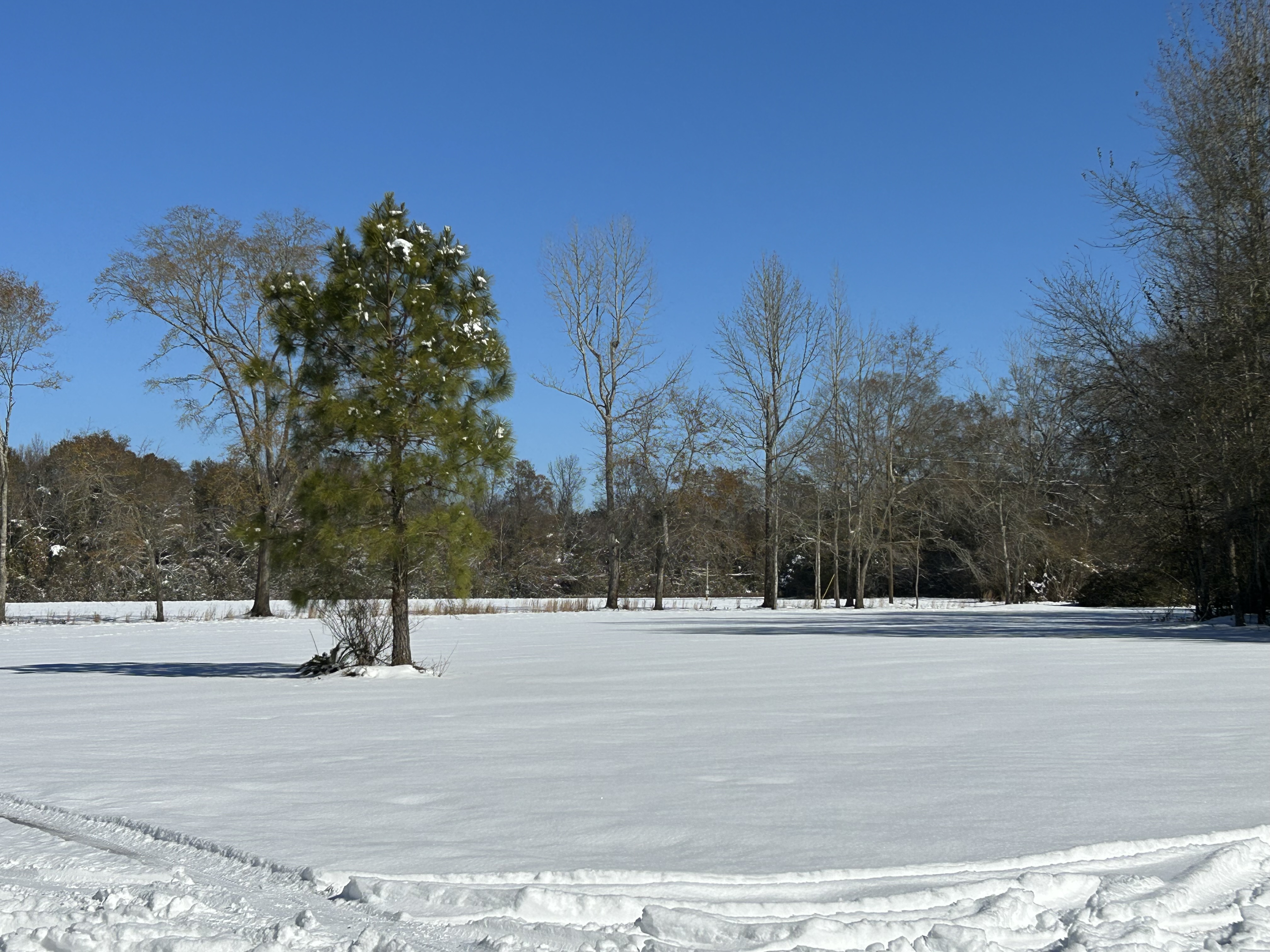
Snowfall in Century, Florida, on January 22

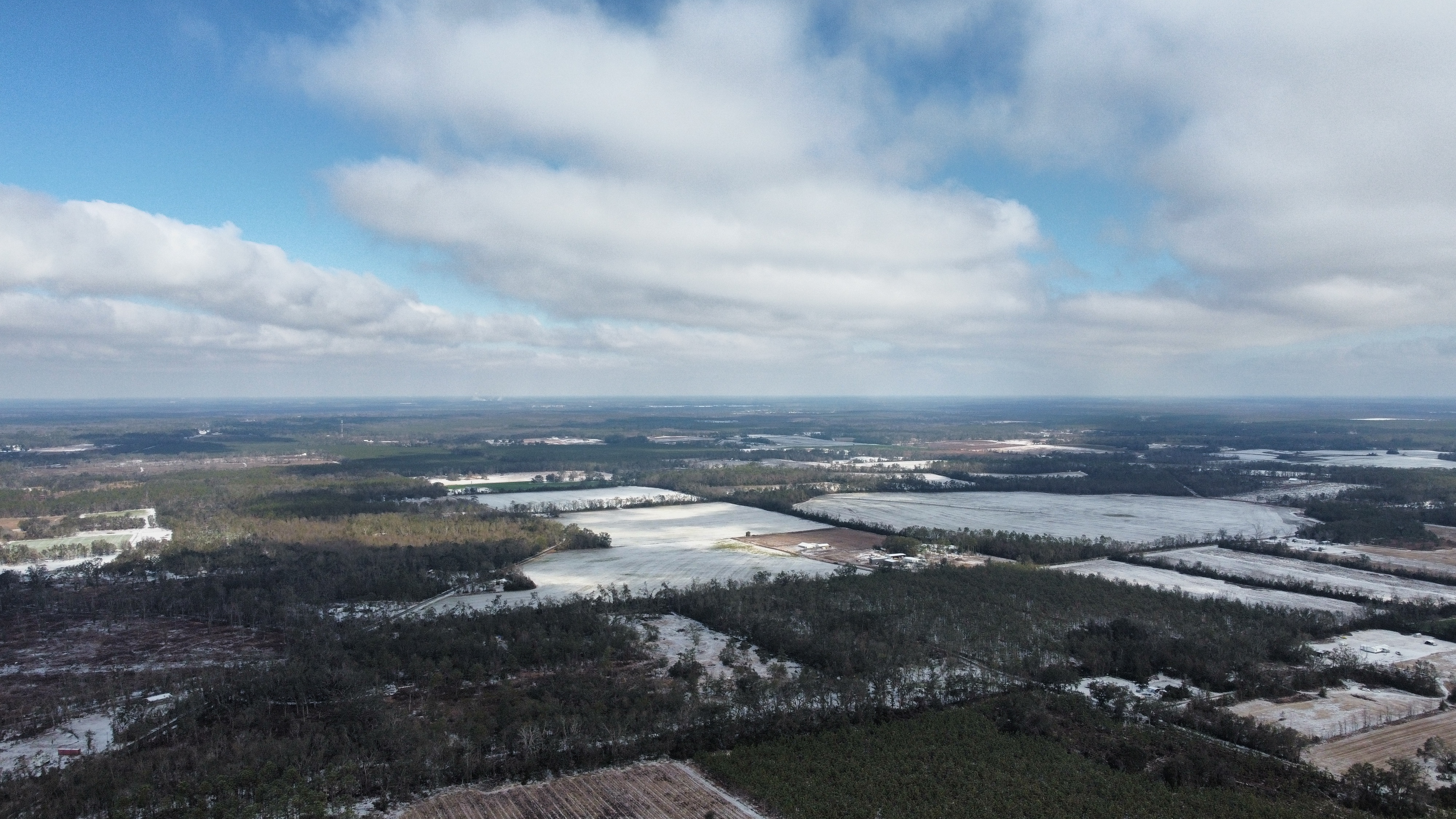
View of the snow from the blizzard in Madison County, Florida

On January 20, Florida governor Ron DeSantis declared a state of emergency for the incoming winter weather. The Florida House of Representatives and Senate cancelled all of the committee meetings that were scheduled to occur during the week of January 20. Tallahassee International Airport cancelled all remaining flights after 3 p.m. local time on January 21. In addition, 65 mi (105 km) of I-10 were shut down in the state.

By late on January 21, Milton recorded 10 in (25 cm) of snowfall. This was more than twice the highest amount of snowfall ever recorded in the state in a single storm. Pensacola recorded 8.9 in (23 cm), almost tripling the record of 3 in (7.6 cm) from February 1895. Further east, the city of Jacksonville recorded their first measurable snowfall in 35 years.

=== North Carolina ===
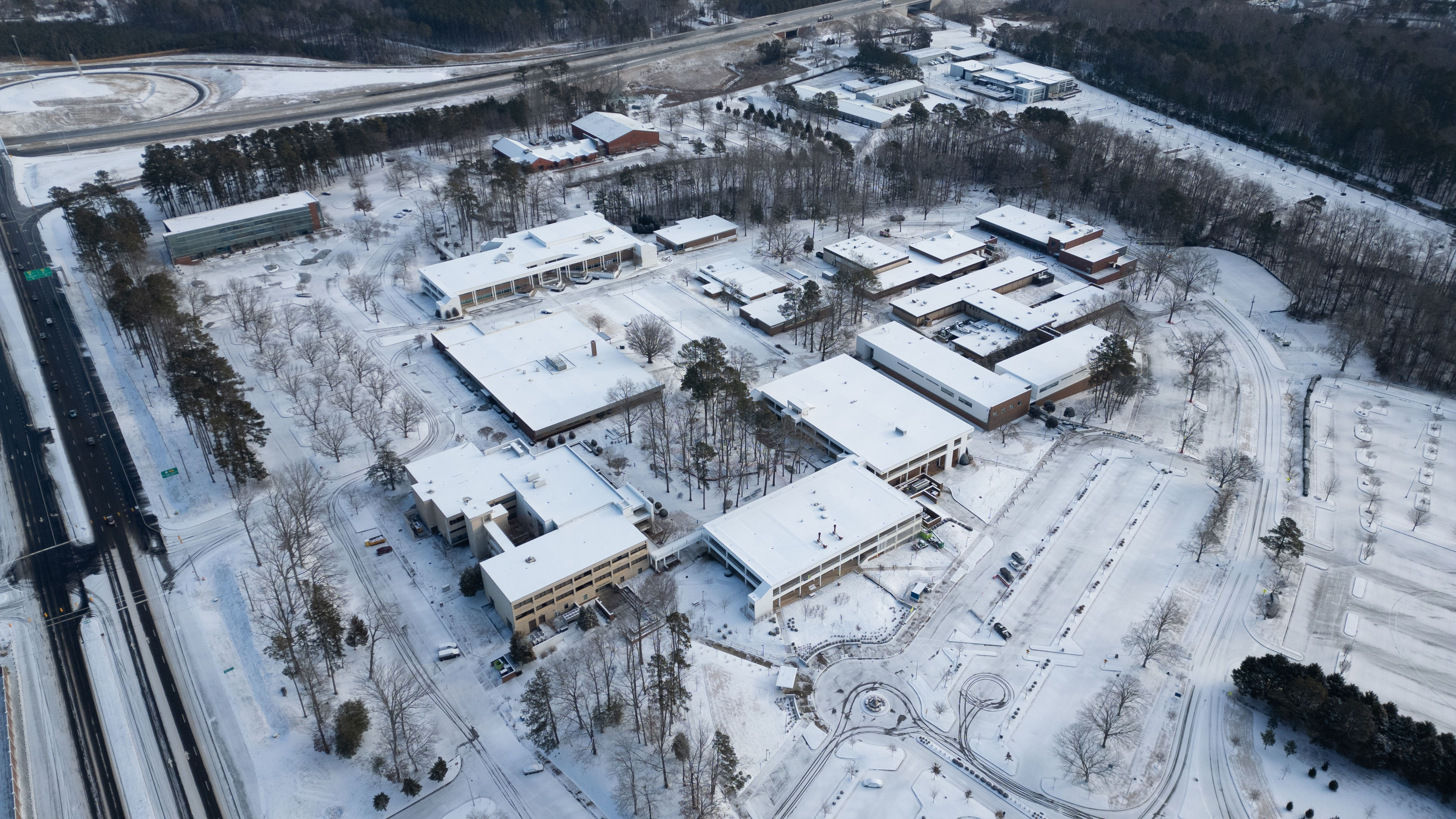
Snowfall in Raleigh, North Carolina

4–6 inches (10–15 cm) of snow was commonly reported across southeastern North Carolina. 6.5 inches (17 cm) of snow was reported in Kelly, North Carolina. An official observation of 2.6 inches (6.6 cm) was reported at the Wilmington International Airport. Further north along the North Carolina coast, widespread reports of 4–6 inches (10–15 cm) of snow in Beaufort, Carteret, Craven, Dare, Hyde, Onslow, and Pamlico counties were common. At the Wright Brothers National Memorial, 9.0 inches (23 cm) was reported.

=== South Carolina ===
4.5 in (11 cm) of snow fell in North Myrtle Beach, South Carolina, which registered as the largest snowstorm in the region since 1989. Many warming shelters across the region were opened. In addition, Myrtle Beach International Airport cancelled all flights through early on January 23.

The storm resulted in numerous closures across the southeastern section of the state, with the Bluffton, South Carolina, police department stating that the roads remained dangerous until January 23. The Jasper County Fire Rescue reported to 19 incidents in the area alone.

Up to 4 inches (10.16 cm) of snowfall was reported in Charleston, and 3 inches was also reported in Beaufort, and upwards of 6 inches was reported in Cross.

== See also ==
- Storm Éowyn
- January 2014 Gulf Coast winter storm
- 2004 Christmas Eve United States winter storm
- February 13–17, 2021 North American winter storm
- February 15–20, 2021 North American winter storm
- Snow in Louisiana
- Snow in Florida
