= December 2017 North American winter storm =

Winter storm in 2017

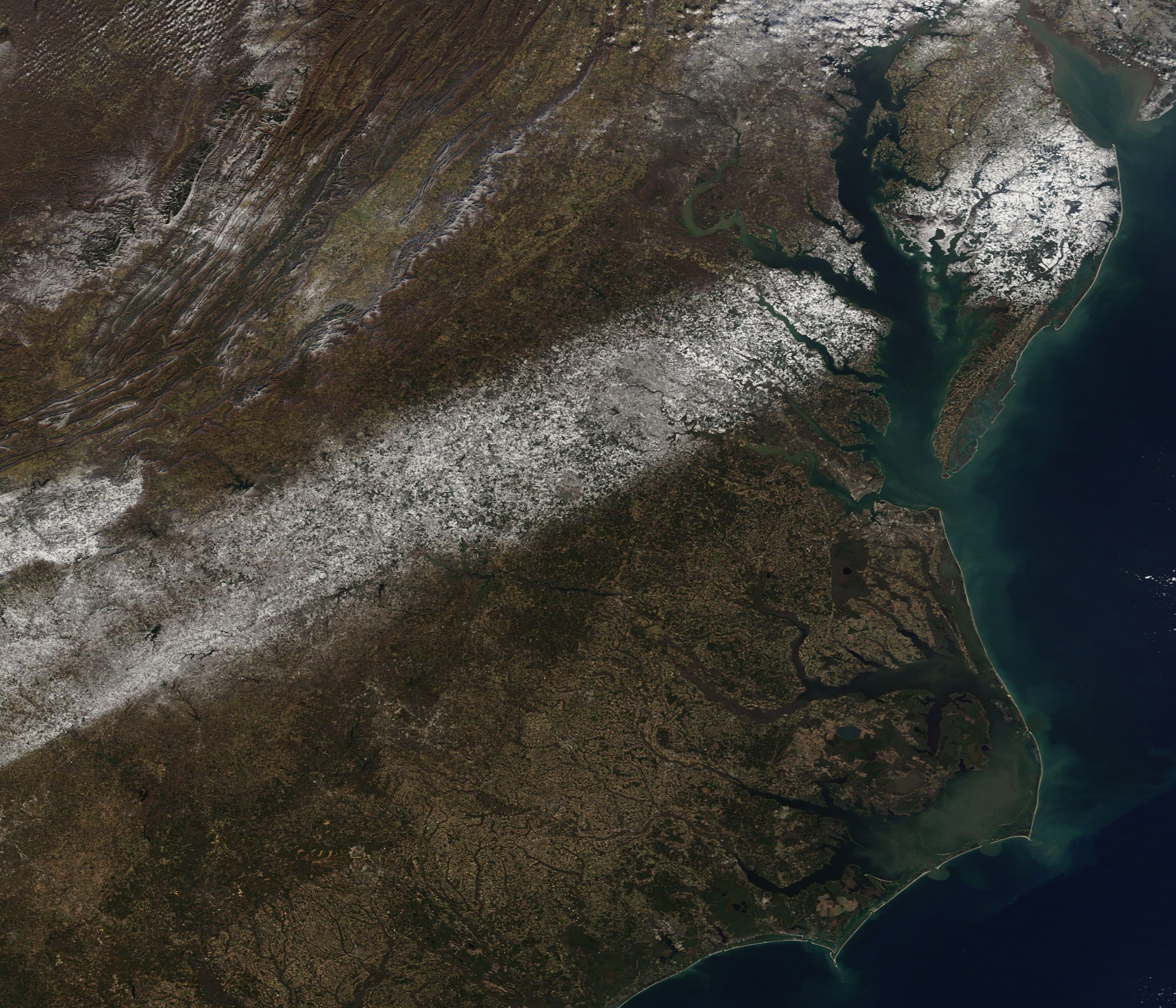
- Satellite imagery of fallen snow across parts of the Mid-Atlantic and Southeast regions of the US, taken on December 11

Meteorological history
- Formed: December 8, 2017
- Dissipated: December 18, 2017

Category 2 "Minor" winter storm
- Regional snowfall index: 3.08 (NOAA)
- Max. snowfall: 64 cm (25 in) at Mount Mitchell, North Carolina, US

Overall effects
- Fatalities: 8
- Injuries: ≥37
- Damage: $1.06 million
- Areas affected: Southern, Mid-Atlantic, and Northeastern United States
- Power outages: >699,660
- Part of the 2017–18 North American winter

A winter storm, unofficially named Winter Storm Benji by The Weather Channel and Storm Zubin by the Free University of Berlin, impacted parts of the Southern, Mid-Atlantic, and Northeastern United States, and later across parts of Europe in December 2017. First developing as a low-pressure area in the Gulf of Mexico, the storm system impacted the Southern United States on December 8, producing rare snowfalls and causing travel impacts across the South. The low then moved northeastward, reaching the Big Bend and western Florida, while continuing to produce snowfall north of the low, across a narrow band stretching from Alabama to North Carolina. A second low-pressure area formed on December 9, producing snow across the East Coast of the United States, including parts of the Mid-Atlantic and Northeastern United States, before the low moved inland over Nova Scotia and the Maritimes the day after. After moving offshore, the low-pressure area strengthened, progressing over the northern Atlantic Ocean before moving over Sweden and Finland and dissipating.

The storm in the Southern United States set numerous snowfall records across Texas, Louisiana, and Mississippi, while also causing extensive damage to power infrastructure and property. Snow accumulated across parts of the Florida panhandle, with flurries being reported as far south as Miramar Beach, Destin, and Pensacola. In southern Florida, severe weather also occurred after a squall line developed along a cold front, which produced wind damage across western and southern parts of the state. In the Mid-Atlantic and Northeastern United States, hundreds of vehicle accidents occurred from the heavy snowfall and also resulted in New York City receiving its first major snowfall of the 2017–18 winter season. The low-pressure area associated with the storm also caused high winds across Germany and severe weather in Switzerland. Overall, the storm killed eight people and injured at least 37 (Note: This includes 31 injury crashes across Connecticut; it is unknown exactly how many injuries occurred. Not included are crashes resulting in hospitalizations in Massachusetts, as there is no exact total of the numbers of crashes or injuries.) others.

== Meteorological synopsis ==
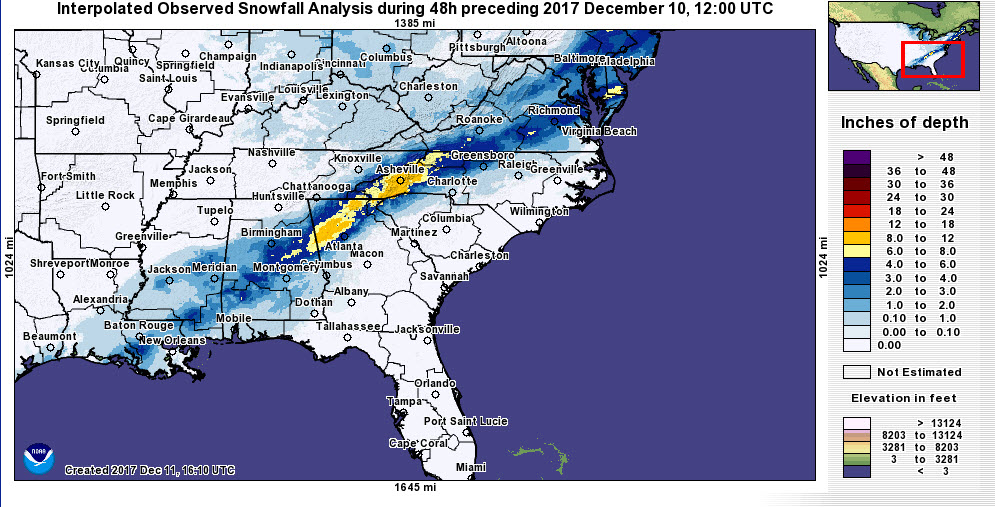
A map of snowfall accumulations from the winter storm

On December 5, 2017, a cold front moved through southern Texas, bringing rainfall and cold air behind it. The front then intensified, which caused temperatures across the region to further decrease into the 4–10 °C (39–50 °F) range and resulted in the cooling of the atmosphere by December 7. On the same day, a separate cold front progressed across the southern Great Plains and the Southeastern United States. The combination of the cooled atmosphere, cold temperatures, and the cold front resulted in a wintry mix developing across southern Texas on December 7 and 8. As the cold front progressed eastward, a broad area of southwesterly wind above the atmosphere developed in the Gulf of Mexico along an upper-level trough located across the southern Plains, as moisture began to be pulled into the trough. A low-pressure area developed in the Gulf of Mexico along a frontal boundary, and moved northeastward towards the Big Bend region in Florida. A zone of intense frontogenesis also formed north of the low-pressure area near the Texas coast, and moved northeast parallel to the low, producing heavy snowfall across a narrow area extending from east-central Alabama to northern Georgia to western North Carolina.

As the low moved across the Southeastern United States on December 9, another low-pressure area developed along a surface front off the Carolina coast. The second low tracked northward, producing snowfall across the Mid-Atlantic and the Northeastern United States, before moving inland across Nova Scotia on December 10. The low-pressure area then reached a pressure of 983 millibars (29.0 inHg) while over the Maritimes in the late morning hours of December 10. As it moved northeast and continued to strengthen away from Newfoundland and Labrador on December 11, the low-pressure area traversed the northern Atlantic Ocean before moving inland over Sweden on December 15. It moved over Finland on December 17 before dissipating on December 18. The storm was unofficially named Winter Storm Benji by The Weather Channel and Storm Zubin by Free University of Berlin, and the National Oceanic and Atmospheric Administration rated it as a Category 2 winter storm in the United States with a regional snowfall index of 3.077.

== Preparations and impact ==
=== Southern United States ===
The winter storm left more than 185,000 power outages across businesses and homes while producing record snowfall across several areas across the region. A study from the Regional Science Policy and Practice found tweets on then-Twitter (now X) increased four-fold from the week prior to the winter storm to during it. Additionally, it also concluded that at-risk persons among the housing and transportation industries were most affected by the winter storm, while persons based on socioeconomic status were not; this was dependent on the acknowledgement of the winter storm by individuals.

==== Texas ====
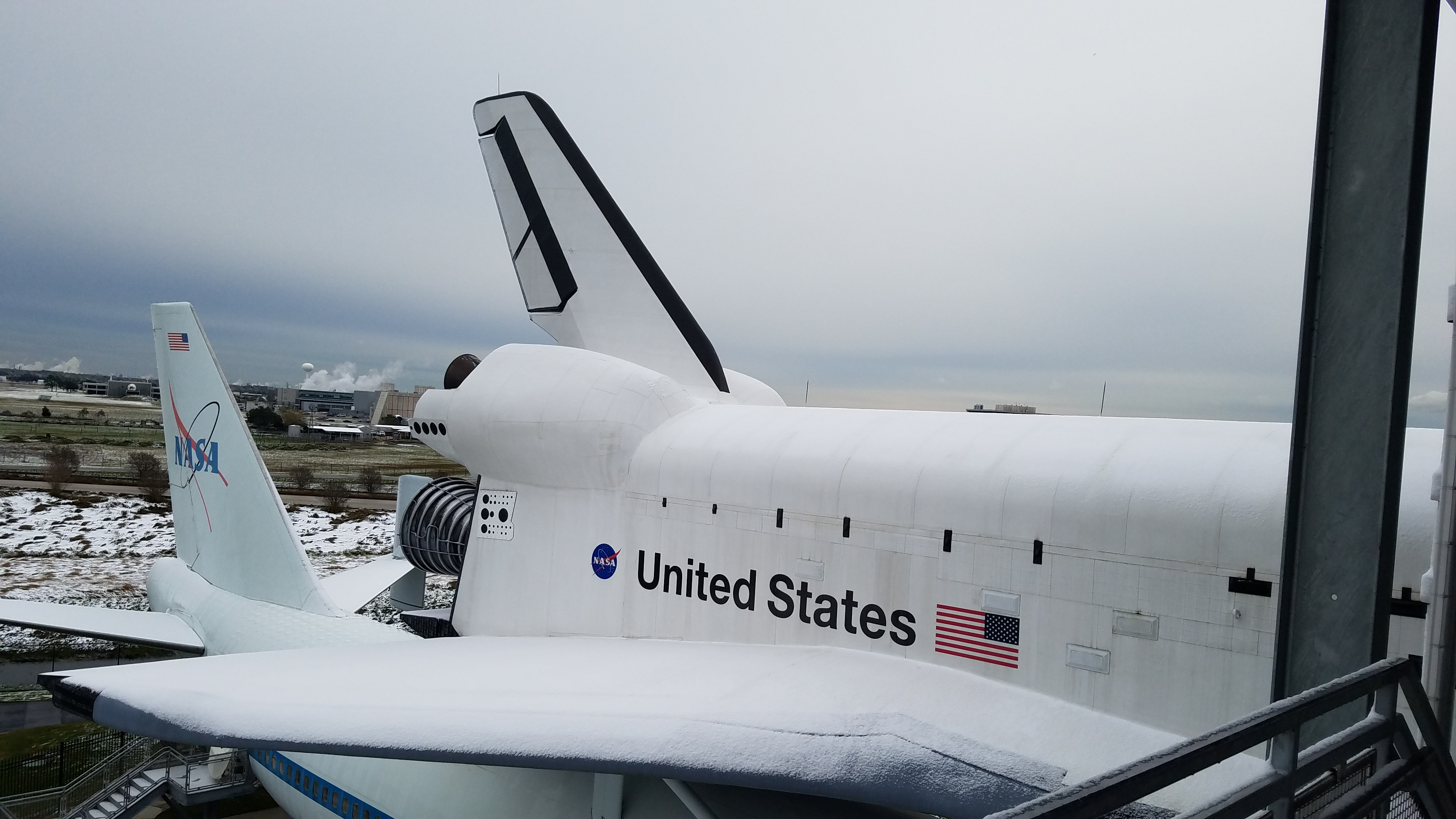
Fallen snow at Space Center Houston on December 8

Icy conditions led to a 26-car collision on an Interstate 410 ramp near San Antonio on December 8, which injured one person and forced the closure of the ramp. Vehicle accidents also contributed to closures on Interstate 10 and Interstate 610. Numerous highways and roads were covered in ice, including Interstate 10, Interstate 45, and Interstate 69, which created hazardous travel conditions. There were several vehicle crashes across the Houston area. Snow fell across several major cities in the state, including Austin, Houston, and San Antonio, and on December 8 a trace of snow fell in Brownsville, the second-ever measurable snowfall there. Corpus Christi received its first measurable snow since 2004, and San Antonio received snowfall in December for the second time on record, and the second-earliest snowfall there. Measurable snow fell in Houston in December for the first time since 2009, and daily snowfall records were broken on December 7 and 8. The Beaumont-Port Arthur area received its first December snowfall ever, where 7.6 cm (3.0 in) of snow fell, and also tied for the second-highest snowfall total ever. In Laredo, 4.3 cm (1.7 in) of snow accumulated, which set a snowfall record on December 8. Flights were delayed at Austin–Bergstrom International Airport, where 3.3 cm (1.3 in) of snow fell, the first snowfall in December since 1948, and nearly 63,000 power outages occurred across Texas. Several people contracted hypothermia from the low temperatures and wind chills caused by the storm, which killed three people and hospitalized two others. Across the state, the weather impacts caused $85,000 in property damage.

==== Louisiana ====
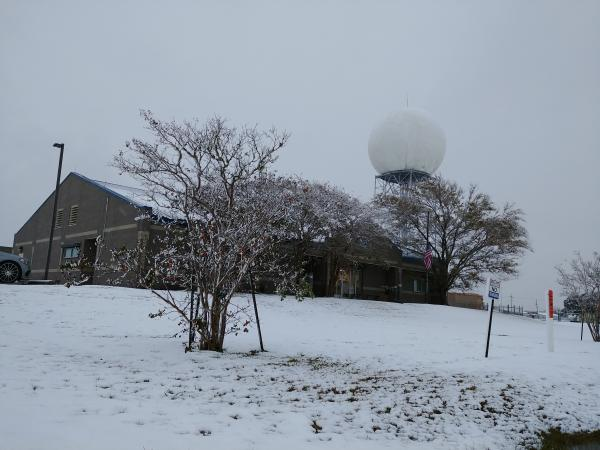
Snowfall at the National Weather Service office in Lake Charles on December 8

As a winter weather advisory was in effect for central Louisiana, Lafayette and Lake Charles recorded their snowiest December days on record, with 5.3 cm (2.1 in) and 4.3 cm (1.7 in) of snow respectively. Snow fell across the Baton Rouge area as well, covering vehicles with snow as 8.9 cm (3.5 in) of snow fell, the third-highest total recorded there. A trace of snow fell in New Orleans, as the state experienced freezing temperatures, causing ice to form, and resulted in seven casualties. In Kentwood, 17 cm (6.7 in) of snow fell, the highest snowfall in the state, while 13 cm (5.1 in) of snow fell in Catahoula Parish southwest of Jonesville. There were 63 vehicle crashes across St. Helena, St. Tammany, Tangipahoa, and Washington parishes, and nearly 100,000 power outages across the state. Icy conditions on overpasses closed parts of Interstate 10, and a curfew was set in Tangipahoa Parish as more than 29,000 power outages occurred across the parish. Several shelters were opened in New Orleans, and a warming shelter opened in St. Tammany Parish. A motorcycle restriction was implemented on the Lake Pontchartrain Causeway bridge, and in Catahoula Parish, property damage amounted to $10,000.

==== Mississippi and Alabama ====
Winter storm warnings were issued for numerous counties in Mississippi as more than 15 cm (5.9 in) fell across southwestern parts of the state. Numerous school districts across the state were closed in preparation for the winter storm. Jackson received 13 cm (5.1 in) of snow, the sixth-highest snowfall recorded there, while two locations separately in Jones and Lamar counties received 20 cm (7.9 in) of snow. In Meridian, 13 cm (5.1 in) of snow fell, the third-highest snowfall there. Across the state, there were nearly 80,000 power outages, and property damages amounted to $820,000.

Across Alabama, the heaviest snow fell across the east of the state, mainly across Clay, Cleburne, and Randolph counties. The heaviest snow in the state fell in Delta, where 38 cm (15 in) fell, the seventh-highest snowfall in the state's history and the second-highest in December. In St. Clair County, 15 cm (5.9 in) of snow fell in Ragland, a county record for the highest snowfall accumulation in a day. Prior to the storm, more than thirty-six school systems were closed. There were several vehicle accidents on Interstate 65, including one which closed all southbound lanes of Interstate 65 in Shelby County, in Calera. Nearly 45,000 power outages occurred across the state, including nearly 10,000 across the Birmingham area. In Mobile, 2.5 cm (0.98 in) of snow fell, the earliest measurable snow there, while 10 cm (3.9 in) of snow fell at Birmingham–Shuttlesworth International Airport, the third-highest snowfall in December there. As of December 2023, Birmingham has not seen more than 2.5 cm (0.98 in) of snowfall.

==== Georgia ====
Before the storm impacted Georgia, winter storm warnings and advisories were in effect for numerous counties. The heaviest snow fell in the north of the state, causing extensive damage to power infrastructure. A seven-vehicle crash closed all lanes of the Langford Parkway in Atlanta on December 8, and many schools across the state, including Metro Atlanta, were closed or dismissed early. Nearly 1,600 flights were cancelled and another 930 delayed at Atlanta International Airport, including the cancellation of more than 600 Delta Air Lines flights on December 8. There were more than 325,000 power outages across northern Georgia, including over 30,000 in the Atlanta metropolitan area. One person was killed after being electrocuted by a downed power line. During the storm, an emergency warming shelter was opened in Atlanta.

==== North Carolina ====
In preparation for the winter storm, several businesses, schools, and government offices in North Carolina were closed. The full length of the Blue Ridge Parkway was closed, and part of North Carolina Highway 128. Mount Mitchell State Park was closed, and Asheville Mall, along with Asheville Outlets, opened late on December 8. Two state football championship games were delayed; one between Wake Forest High School and Mallard Creek High School, and the other between Scotland High School and Harding University High School. Two events that state governor Roy Cooper was scheduled to appear in were postponed.

The heaviest snow fell across western areas of North Carolina, causing 54 vehicle accidents. One crash injured two people and briefly closed all eastbound lanes of Interstate 40, and another crash near Sylva injured one person. A crash at a shopping center in Burke County injured one person, and several crashes occurred on the Triangle Expressway and on Interstate 540. Delays occurred across several highways, including on Interstate 26 and Interstate 40, and the heaviest snow for the storm and in the state fell on Mount Mitchell, where 64 cm (25 in) was recorded. Several flights were cancelled at Asheville Regional Airport, and more than 39,000 power outages occurred across North Carolina. A warming center was opened in the Asheville area by the American Red Cross.

==== Elsewhere ====
Snow fell as far south as the Florida panhandle, including across Escambia County, Florida, where snow fell in Molino and flurries were reported in Miramar Beach, Destin, and Pensacola, the latter of which received a trace of snow. Ice on a U.S. Route 29 bridge between McDavid and Century killed one person, and there were several other vehicle crashes near the bridge. Boat parades were cancelled across western Florida due to heavy rainfall, including parades in St. Petersburg and South Pasadena. Temperatures reached a high of 9 °C (48 °F) in St. Petersburg, and 16 °C (61 °F) in Miami. The low temperatures resulted in 16 flights being cancelled and 121 delayed at Tampa International Airport. A level 2/slight risk for severe weather was issued by the Storm Prediction Center on its Day 1 Outlook on December 8 across areas of western Florida, which also included a 5 percent tornado risk. A squall line developed along a cold front that moved through western and southern parts of the state, producing high wind gusts and causing $50,000 in property damage. A funnel cloud was reported in Miami-Dade County.

The storm caused 660 power outages across the Greenville, South Carolina area, and the highest snow fell in the state near Cedar Mountain, where 23 cm (9.1 in) of snow was reported.

=== Mid-Atlantic ===
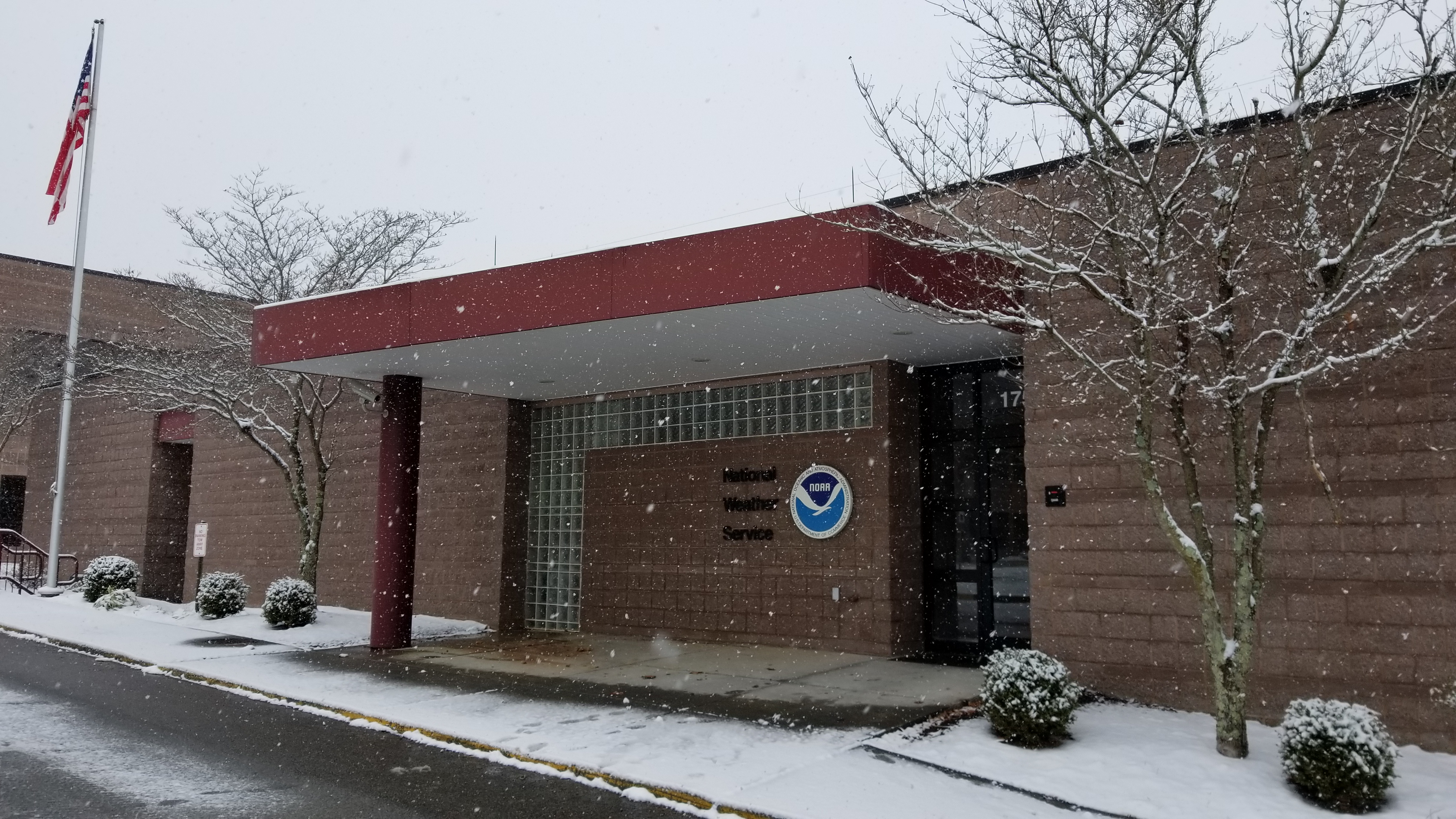
The National Weather Service's office in Blacksburg, Virginia covered in snow on December 9

In Maryland, athletic events in Baltimore were postponed, along with school activities in numerous other counties. In preparation for the storm, Baltimore Department of Transportation crews were deployed, spreading more than 18,000 tons of salt across Baltimore County. Winter weather advisories were issued for parts of Maryland and Washington, D.C., and winter storm warnings were in effect for southern Maryland. Snow fell in December in Washington for the first time since 2013, and snowfall records were broken at several locations across Maryland and Washington, including at Baltimore/Washington International Airport, Dulles International Airport, and Ronald Reagan Washington National Airport.

Public school activities were cancelled in Virginia, including in Fairfax and Alexandria, the latter of which also cancelled an ACT test across the city's school district. The heaviest snow across the state fell in Henrico County, where Laurel received 13 cm (5.1 in) of snow. Two people were killed after a car crash, and there were more than 200 vehicle crashes across the state, including one which shut down all lanes of Georgetown Pike after power lines were downed. About 18,000 power outages occurred across Virginia, including 3,500 across the north of the state. The storm caused $95,000 in property damage.

=== Northeastern United States ===
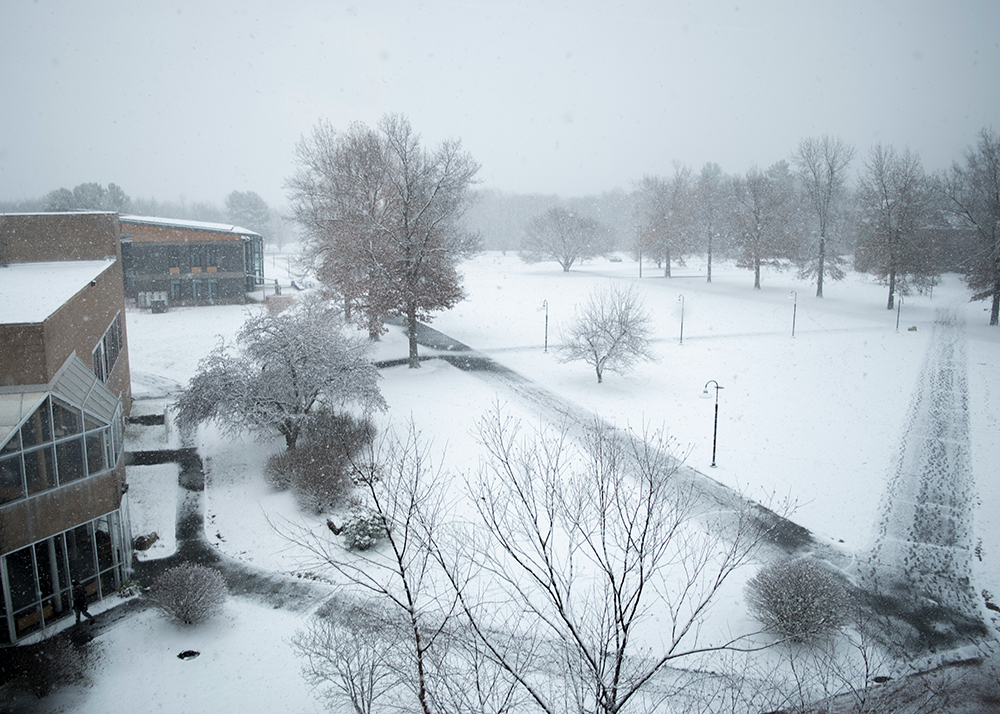
Snow at Hampshire College on December 9

Before the winter storm, speed restrictions were implemented along the New Jersey Turnpike, Garden State Parkway, and Delaware River bridges, and Six Flags Great Adventure was closed in Jackson, New Jersey, along with a planned attempt at a world-record-breaking snowball fight there. The majority of the state was under a winter storm advisory, while five counties were under a winter storm warning. A nine-vehicle crash closed a ramp to U.S. Route 422 in Tredyffrin Township, Pennsylvania, while another vehicle crash closed a lane of Interstate 95 in Pennsylvania and caused delays. Philadelphia broke its daily snowfall record on December 9, receiving 10 cm (3.9 in) of snow, surpassing the previous record set in 1942. Prior to the storm impacting New York, two facilities at Fordham University closed. Central Park received 12 cm (4.7 in) of snow, and New York City received its first major snowfall of the 2017–18 winter season.

A speed restriction was implemented on the Massachusetts Turnpike, as vehicles slid off the Turnpike in Framingham, Massachusetts. More than 2,100 crews were deployed by the Massachusetts Department of Transportation to treat roadways across the state, and nearly 300 equipment pieces were deployed by Worcester, Massachusetts, Department of Public Works. A parking ban was implemented in Worcester. Across Massachusetts, the most snow fell in Framingham, where 19 cm (7.5 in) of snow fell, while Arlington received 18 cm (7.1 in) of snow, and Boston had 15 cm (5.9 in) of snow. Numerous vehicle crashes occurred across Massachusetts, with several people being hospitalized. There was a parking ban also issued in Hampshire County, Massachusetts, where 65 vehicles were towed in Northampton. There were three vehicle crashes in Hampshire County. In Connecticut, about 354 vehicle accidents occurred in nearly a 24-hour period, including 31 crashes with minor injuries. In the state, 228 motorist incidents occurred, while crashes occurred across Bethel, Greenwich, and Ridgefield, Connecticut. Several vehicle crashes and incidents of vehicles sliding off roads took place across Maine, including in Bangor and Auburn. Delays occurred at airports across the Northeast, including at Newark Liberty International Airport, John F. Kennedy International Airport, and Philadelphia International Airport.

=== Germany and Switzerland ===
Flights were disrupted at Munich Airport in Germany, including one being cancelled and two which were delayed. Severe weather and high winds in Switzerland uprooted trees, some of which obstructed roads, and caused property damage in Baselland. A woman was killed when a tree fell on her tent. High winds also overturned barriers at multiple construction sites, and felled a tree onto a moving vehicle. Fallen trees blocked transit lines in Bruderholz, and many calls were made to Baselland public safety for assistance.

== See also ==
- 2025 Gulf Coast blizzard
