= Florida State Road 89 =

State highway in Florida, United States

State Road 89
- SR 89 highlighted in red

Route information
- Maintained by FDOT
- Length: 31.204 mi (50.218 km)

Major junctions
- South end: US 90 in Milton
- SR 87 at Point Baker; SR 4 in Jay
- North end: CR 55 towards Brewton, AL

Location
- Country: United States
- State: Florida
- Counties: Santa Rosa

Highway system
- Florida State Highway System; Interstate; US; State; Former; Pre‑1945; Toll; Scenic
← SR 87	→ US 90

State Road 89 (SR 89) is a north–south highway in the state of Florida that extends from U.S. Route 90 (US 90) to the Alabama state line where it becomes County Road 55. All of SR 89 is contained within Santa Rosa County, and most of the road is a two-lane undivided highway, except between Milton and Point Baker, where it is a four-lane divided highway.

== Route description ==
State Road 89 begins as Dogwood Drive at US 90 in Milton. This entire segment is a four-lane divided highway. What passes for major intersections along this segment consist of County Road 184A(Berryhill Road) and later County Road 191, which is Willard Norris Road to the west and Magnolia Street to the east. North of Milton, it joins a concurrency with State Road 87, which is also a four-lane divided highway north and south of this concurrency, which ends in Point Baker where SR 89 branches off to the northwest onto two-lane undivided Oriole Street just before SR 87 runs in front of Whiting Field. As Oriole Street, SR 89 spends much of its time switching from running northwest to straight north. During the second of these straight north segments, it has an intersection with County Road 182(Central School Road), a road spanning from Chumuckla to Allentown. Later the road makes a sharp left turn between Penton Road and Dusty Trail where it runs straight west in front of the Pine View Cemetery, only to turn northwest again. The next intersection that passes for a major one is County Road 178(Spanish Trail) which spans from New York and north of Allentown. Continuing at the same angle it encounters only two other local streets and but then has a short concurrency with CR 164 between Harvest Road and Greenwood Road. After this the road turns from northwest to straight north in front of the R V Jordan Airport, and then turns northeast before approaching the northern terminus of CR 197(Chumuckla Highway). Further northeast it enters the Town of Jay, where SR 89 is named South Alabama Street.

Within the town, SR 89 intersects mostly local streets as well as Jay Hospital (a.k.a. Andrews Institute Rehabilitation), however one street in particular (Commerce Street), can be found at a fork in the road that leads to CR 197A. This fork was the center of a former gift shop. After passing by one more local street in the center of town it turns right along a one block concurrency with State Road 4(First Avenue East), which also serves as the eastern terminus of a one block concurrency with CR 197A between Commerce and Alabama Streets. Turning left onto Magnolia Street, the road runs straight north until it reaches CR 197A(North Alabama Avenue), where it turns northeast again. The last intersection in Jay is Old Pollard Road, and SR 89 has one other intersection with a street named Travis Bynum Road before it enters the next community, a farming community named Mount Carmel where it encounters the northern terminus of County Road 399, and another intersection with two other streets. After one more local street, it takes a sharp northwest turn at a wye intersection with Dixonville Road. The last intersection in the State of Florida is with a street named "Our Lane" which leads to "Slick City Road" and into the State of Alabama. State Road 89 ends at the Florida-Alabama State Line, where it enters Escambia County, Alabama and becomes CR 55.

== Major intersections ==
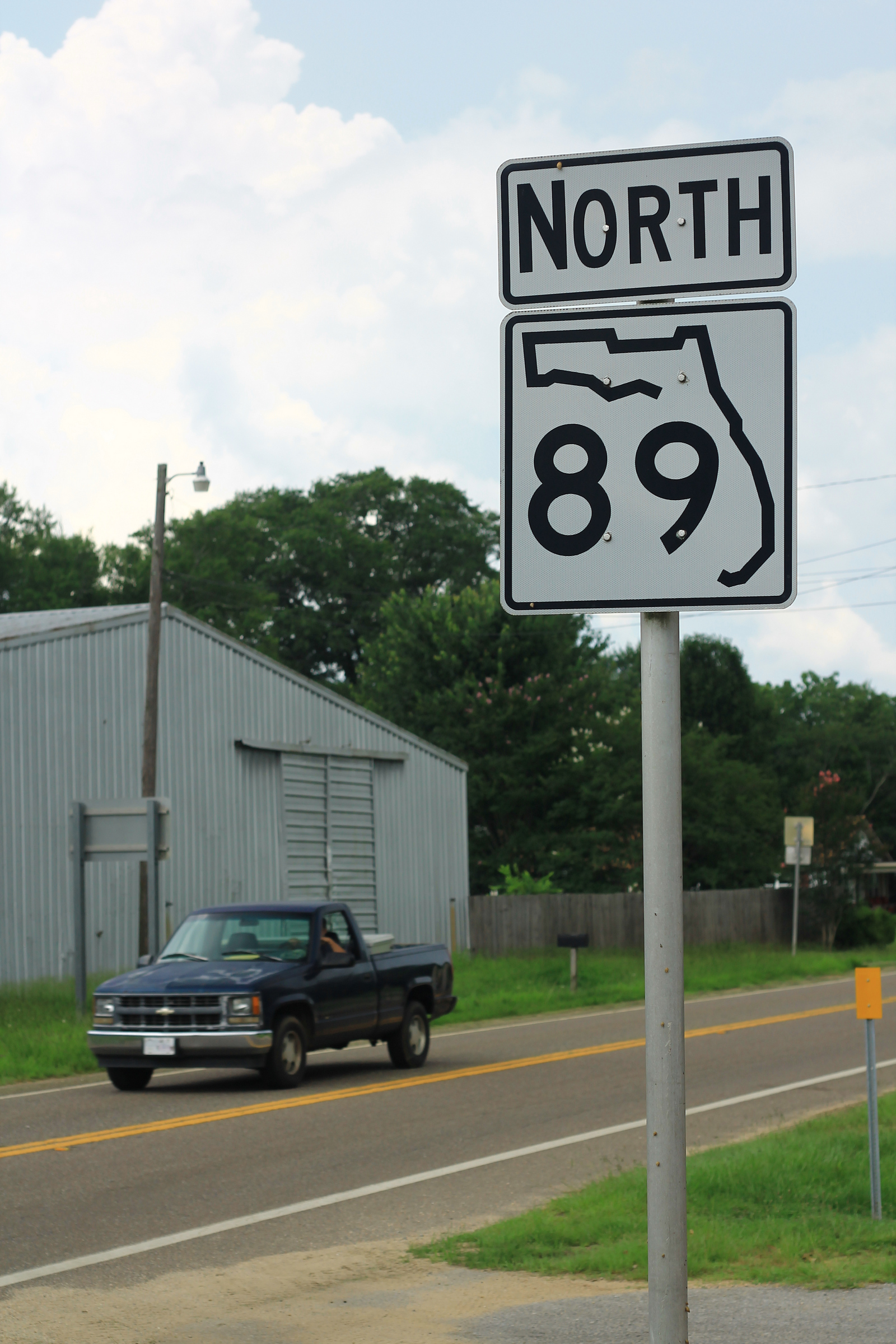
A sign somewhere along northbound SR 89.

The entire route is in Santa Rosa County.

Location	mi	km	Destinations	Notes
Milton	0.000	0.000	US 90 (Caroline Street / SR 10)	Southern terminus of SR 89
Milton	0.795	1.279	CR 184A west (Berryhill Road)	
Milton	2.100	3.380	CR 191 (Willard Norris Road / Magnolia Street)	
	3.561	5.731	SR 87 south (Stewart Street) – Milton, Blackwater River State Park	South end of SR 87 overlap
Point Baker	5.202	8.372	SR 87 north – Brewton, NAS Whiting Field	North end of SR 87 overlap
	12.461	20.054	CR 182 (Central School Road) – University of Florida Jay Research Farm	
	18.437	29.671	CR 178	
	21.706	34.932	CR 164 west (Harvest Road)	
	22.811	36.711	CR 164 east (Greenwood Road)	
	24.123	38.822	CR 197 south (Chumuckla Highway)	
Jay	26.992	43.439	SR 4 / CR 197 north (Alabama Street) – Century	Southern end of SR 4 overlap
Jay	27.179	43.740	SR 4 – Munson	Northern end of SR 4 overlap
Jay	27.453	44.181	Alabama Street (CR 197 south)	
Mount Carmel	29.624	47.675	CR 399 south (Tractor Trail)	
	31.204	50.218	CR 55 north (Jay Road) – Brewton	Northern terminus of SR 89; Florida–Alabama state line
1.000 mi = 1.609 km; 1.000 km = 0.621 mi: Concurrency terminus

== County Road 89 ==
County Road 89
- Location: Pine Bluff–East Milton

On the opposite side of the Blackwater River is a county extension of SR 89 called County Road 89. The road begins in Pine Bluff, and runs north to Ward Basin where it serves as the western terminus of eastern County Road 184, and then has a parclo-interchange with Interstate 10 at Exit 28. It then continues northwest to East Milton where it eventually encounters the US 90/SR 87 multiplex, and secretly turns west to reunite with SR 89 in Milton.
