= Florida State Road 87 =

State highway in Florida, United States

State Road 87
- Navarre Beach Expressway
- SR 87 highlighted in red

Route information
- Maintained by FDOT
- Length: 51.687 mi (83.182 km)

Major junctions
- South end: US 98 in Navarre
- I-10 near East Milton; US 90 in Milton; SR 4 near Berrydale
- North end: SR 41 towards Brewton, AL

Location
- Country: United States
- State: Florida
- Counties: Santa Rosa

Highway system
- Florida State Highway System; Interstate; US; State; Former; Pre‑1945; Toll; Scenic
← SR 85	→ SR 89

State Road 87 (SR 87; sometimes called the Navarre Beach Expressway, especially south of U.S. 90) is a 51.687-mile-long (83.182 km) north–south highway in the state of Florida that extends from U.S. Route 98 (US 98) to the Alabama state line where it becomes State Route 41. All of SR 87 is contained within Santa Rosa County.

== Route description ==
State Road 87 contains a 19.4-mile (31.2 km) section extending northward from US 98 at Navarre, Florida to US 90 just east of Milton, Florida. This portion of SR 87 is marked as SR 87 South. On this stretch it passes through the western edge of the Eglin Air Force Base training range. After having an interchange with Interstate 10 (I-10) at exit 31, it shares a 4.6-mile (7.4 km) east–west section of US 90 until it reaches Milton where it turns north onto Stewart Street, and runs for another 30.4-mile (48.9 km) section from Milton, Florida northward to the Alabama state line, where it continues towards Brewton as Alabama State Route 41. This portion of SR 87 is marked as SR 87 North. While within Milton city limits it becomes a divided highway between Ridge Crest Drive and Mitchell Cemetery near Whiting Field in Point Baker.

== Major intersections ==
The entire route is in Santa Rosa County.

Location	mi	km	Destinations	Notes
Navarre	0.000	0.000	US 98 (Navarre Parkway / SR 30) – Fort Walton Beach, Gulf Breeze, Zoo	
Navarre	2.140	3.444	CR 399 west (East Bay Boulevard) / Turkey Bluff Road	Eastern terminus of CR 399
Navarre; Holley	2.74	4.41	Bridge over East Bay River	
	16.400	26.393	CR 184 west (Hickory Hammock Road) / Nichols Lake Road west – Southern Raceway	Eastern terminus of CR 184
	18.49	29.76	I-10 (SR 8) – Pensacola, Tallahassee	Exit 31 on I-10
	19.727	31.748	US 90 east (SR 10) / East Milton Road – Holt, Crestview, Blackwater River State Park, Santa Rosa Correctional Institution	Southern terminus of US 90 concurrency
East Milton	22.738	36.593	CR 89 south (Ward Basin Road)	
Milton	23.77	38.25	Bridge over Blackwater River	
Milton	24.050	38.705	CR 191 south (Canal Street) to I-10	
Milton	24.322	39.142	US 90 west (Caroline Street / SR 10) – Pace	Northern terminus of US 90 concurrency
Milton	25.109	40.409	CR 191 north (Munson Highway) – Munson, Blackwater River State Forest	southern terminus of CR 191
Milton	25.955	41.771	CR 191 west (Magnolia Street)	
	27.531	44.307	SR 89 south (Dogwood Drive)	Southern terminus of SR 89 concurrency
Point Baker	29.172	46.948	SR 89 north – Jay	Northern terminus of SR 89 concurrency
	30.346	48.837	CR 87A east (Langley Street) – NAS Whiting Field	Western terminus of CR 87A
Allentown	34.246	55.114	CR 182 west (Allentown Road)	
	39.243	63.155	CR 178 west	
	42.512	68.416	CR 399 west (Country Mill Road)	
	44.496	71.609	SR 4 to US 90 – Jay, Munson, Blackwater River State Forest	
	49.718	80.013	CR 87A south (Market Road)	Northern terminus of CR 87A
Dixonville	51.687	83.182	SR 41 north – Brewton	Continuation beyond Alabama state line
1.000 mi = 1.609 km; 1.000 km = 0.621 mi: Concurrency terminus

== County Road 87A ==
County Road 87A
- Location: Santa Rosa County

County Road 87A is one of three suffixed alternate county roads of SR 87, according to the Florida Department of Transportation. The first of which is in Milton beginning at the west end of the concurrency of US 90/SR 87 and CR 191. The road begins as Canal Street between US 90/SR 87 and Berryhill Road. The route then runs west along Berryhill road for one block until it turns north again at Alabama Street. CR 87A crosses Munson Highway (a leg of CR 191), and then the Blackwater Heritage State Rail Trail until it curves west onto North Avenue and ends at SR 87.

The second CR 87A is in Point Baker, north of the north end of the SR 89 overlap. It runs east from SR 87 as Langley Street into Whiting Field Naval Air Station, which bisects the road. The other end of CR 87A runs south from Whiting Field as East Gate Road and ends at CR 191 (Munson Highway) across from the intersection of Roeville Road.

The third CR 87A is Market Road near Berrydale, which runs east and west from State Road 4 to SR 87, far north of the northwest corner of the intersection of SRs 87 and 4.
