= Interstate 10 in Florida =

Highway in Florida

Interstate 10
- I-10 highlighted in red

Route information
- Maintained by FDOT
- Length: 362.057 mi (582.674 km)
- Existed: 1958–present
- NHS: Entire route

Major junctions
- West end: I-10 near Robertsdale, AL
- US 29 near Ensley; I-110 in Pensacola; US 231 near Cottondale; US 27 in Tallahassee; US 19 near Monticello; US 129 near Live Oak; I-75 near Lake City; US 41 near Lake City; US 301 near Jacksonville; I-295 in Jacksonville
- East end: I-95 / US 17 / SR 15 / SR 228 in Jacksonville

Location
- Country: United States
- State: Florida
- Counties: Escambia, Santa Rosa, Okaloosa, Walton, Holmes, Washington, Jackson, Gadsden, Leon, Jefferson, Madison, Suwannee, Columbia, Baker, Nassau, Duval

Highway system
- Interstate Highway System; Main; Auxiliary; Suffixed; Business; Future; Florida State Highway System; Interstate; US; State; Former; Pre‑1945; Toll; Scenic
← SR 9B	→ SR 10
← SR 7	SR 8	→ SR 8A

Interstate 10 (I-10) runs for 362 miles (583 km) in Florida as the easternmost section of an east–west Interstate Highway in the southern United States. It is also the eastern end of one of three coast-to-coast Interstates, along with I-80 and I-90. The highway runs east from the Alabama border, traveling through the Panhandle of Florida, serving the major cities of Pensacola, Tallahassee, Lake City, ending at Jacksonville, and carries the hidden Florida Department of Transportation (FDOT) designation of State Road 8 (SR 8).

== Route description ==
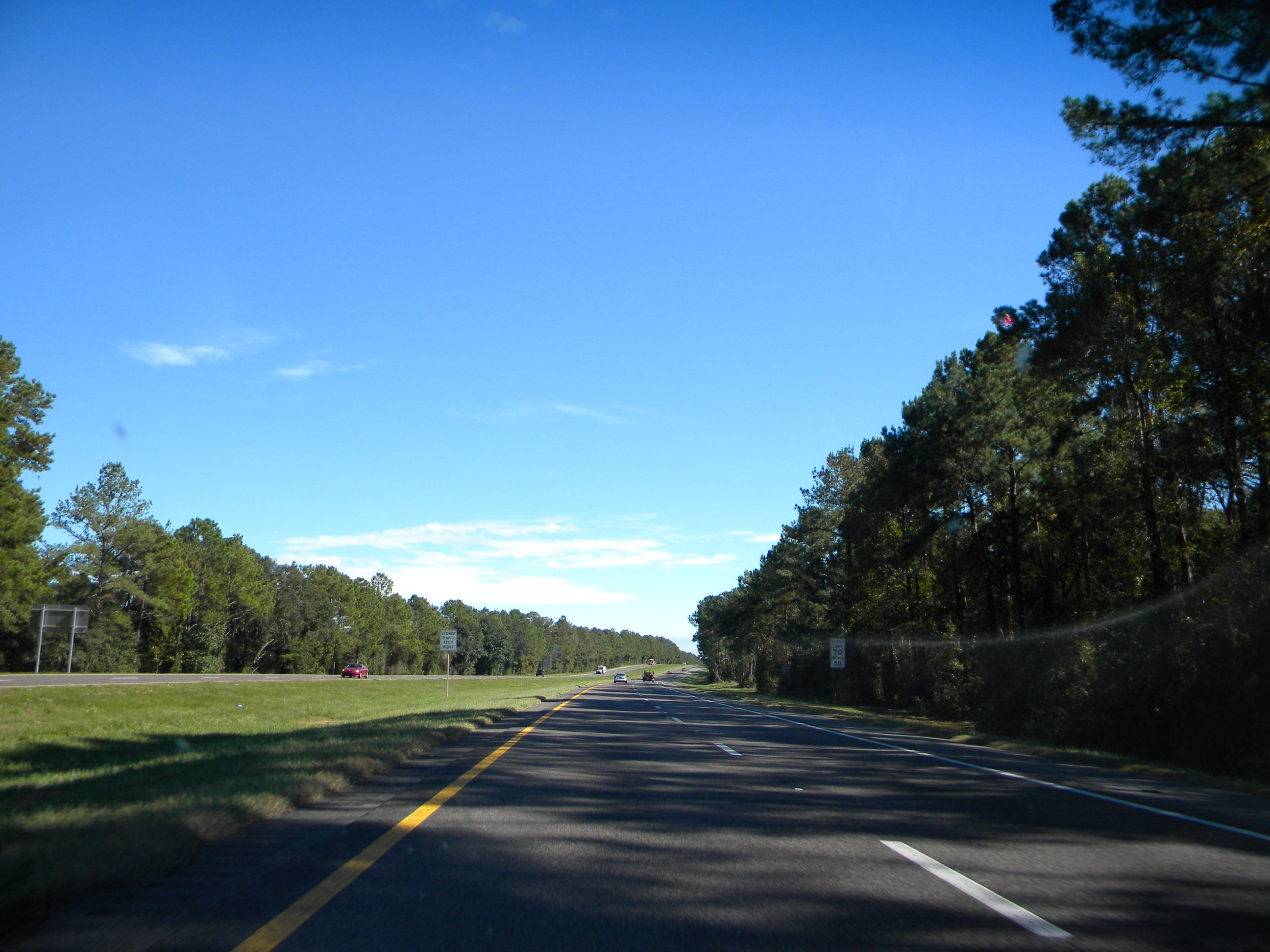
Eastbound view of I-10 near Lake City and I-75

The Interstate runs roughly parallel to US Highway 90 (US 90) (which intersects I-10 at five different points along its route), but is a more direct route, bypassing the central cores of many cities. I-10 runs through some of the least populated areas of the state.

I-10 crosses into Florida at Alabama state line at the Perdido River, just west of Pensacola, in Escambia County. Florida State Road 297 (SR 297, southbound) at exit 7A, gives access to the Pensacola Naval Air Station and the National Museum of Naval Aviation. On the border between Brent and Ensley, the median approaching exits 10A and 10B becomes unexpectedly wide in order to accommodate flyover on-ramps from US 29 that enter the left sides of the road. At exit 12, I-10 serves as the northern terminus of I-110, a spur route to central Pensacola. The highway leaves the county at the Escambia Bay Bridge and has two interchanges within Santa Rosa County before crossing another bridge over the Blackwater River. After that bridge, it has two more interchanges with a pair of rest areas in between before crossing the Santa Rosa–Okaloosa county line.

The road crosses the border between the Central and Eastern time zones at the long Dewey M. Johnson Bridge, over the Apalachicola River. East of the bridge over the Ochlockonee River and the rest areas that follow, I-10 widens from four to six lanes and remains that way until after the interchange with SR 61 and US 319 in Tallahassee.

Like at US 29 in Escambia County, the median for I-10 widens in the vicinity of I-75 at exits 296A and 296B, near Lake City, in order to accommodate flyover on-ramps that enter from the left sides of the road.

A 21-mile-long (34 km) segment between exits 303 and 324 contains no interchanges because it passes through a portion of Osceola National Forest. The sole means of leaving and reentering the highway in this section is at a pair of rest areas, the easternmost rest areas along I-10. The road widens to six lanes again at the interchange with the First Coast Expressway. Just as I-75 did with I-10 in Columbia County, I-10's interchange with I-295 uses single ramps leading to both directions on I-295 with east-to-north and south-to-west flyover ramps leading to the median of I-295. US 17 overlaps I-10 for two exits before the eastern terminus of the Interstate, located in the Brooklyn neighborhood of Jacksonville's urban core at I-95.

== History ==
=== Construction ===
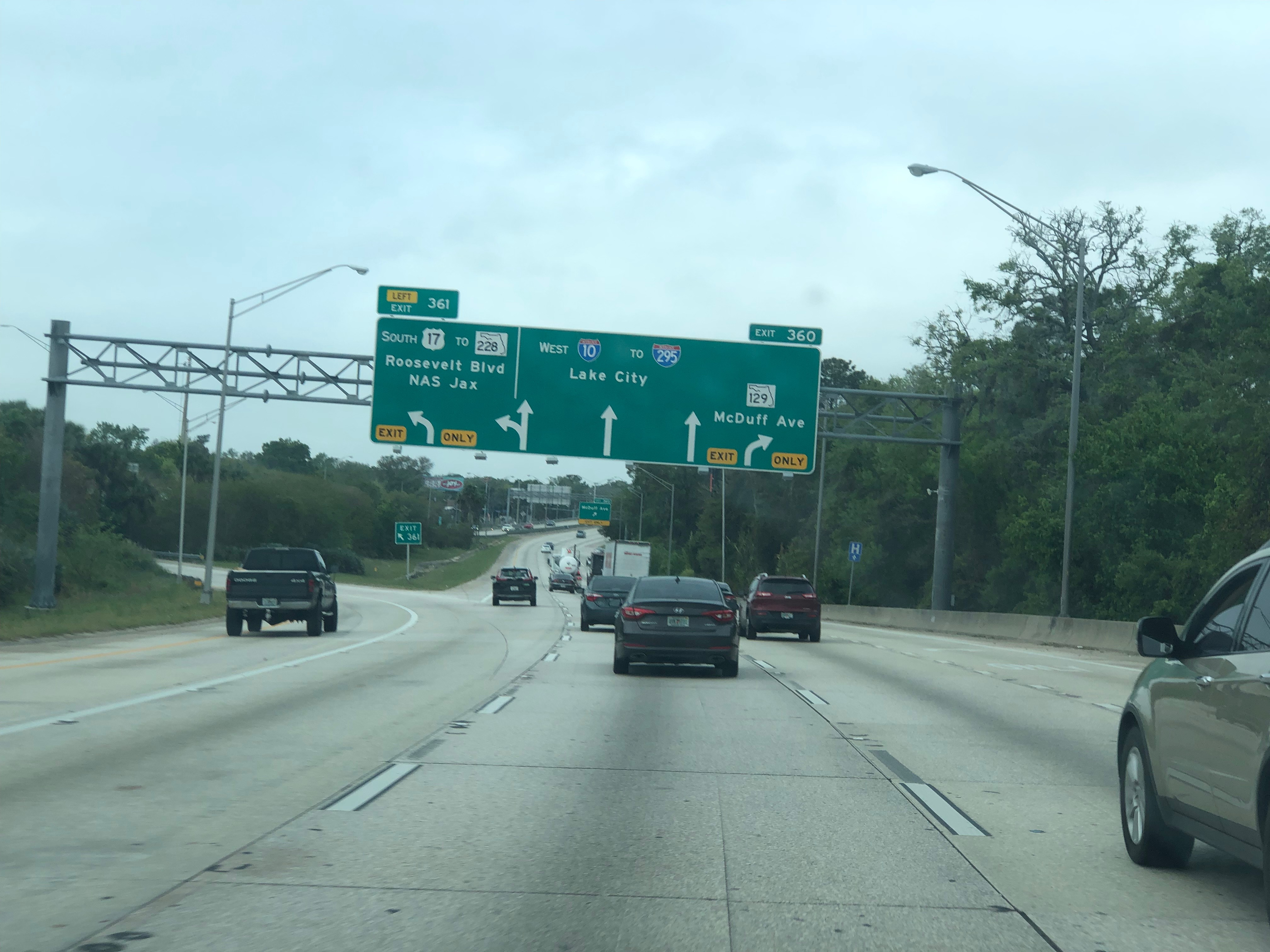
I-10 west at the interchange for US 17 Alt. south in Jacksonville

Prior to the construction of I-10, US 90 was the main east–west highway across the state.

The first section of I-10 in Florida was completed between Sanderson and Jacksonville in 1961. Construction on points westward continued in 1962. The route between Sanderson and Winfield was completed in 1963. By 1967, construction had been completed from the Alabama state line to SR 87 and was under construction from Falmouth to I-75. New construction extending I-10 east from SR 87 to Mossy Head began in 1968. The Falmouth to I-75 segment opened in 1969. Construction began in 1970 further extending I-10 eastward from Mossy Head to DeFuniak Springs. New construction began in 1973 from DeFuniak Springs to Caryville and from Drifton to Capitola; the segment between Drifton and Falmouth opened that year. The Capitola–Drifton segment was completed the following year. Construction began between Caryville and Chipley in 1974, and from Chipley to Midway in 1975. The segment between Chipley and Midway was completed in 1977 except for a small portion between Kynesville and Oakdale; in 1978, the entire length of I-10, as well as the I-110 spur in Pensacola across the state opened along its original planned route.

During the planning stage of construction, I-10 was placed just north of the central business district of Tallahassee, roughly along the current route of US 90 through town, while later a spur route was proposed to go to the core of the city. Both of these proposals were dropped and a route across the north side of the city was chosen. In 2008, the Interstate stretch in Tallahassee was expanded to six lanes to alleviate congestion.

In 2002, I-10, along with most of Florida's Interstates, switched over from a sequential exit numbering system to a mileage-based exit numbering system.

=== Rest area security concerns ===
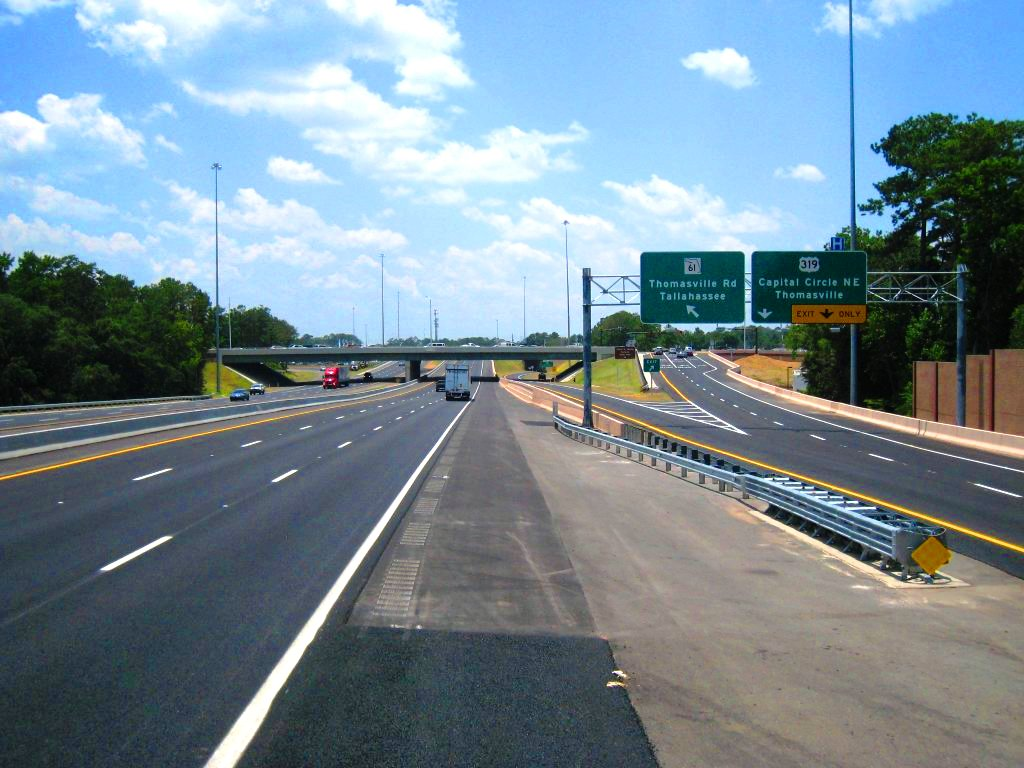
I-10 west approaching the interchange for US 319/SR 61 in Tallahassee

In 1993, a British tourist was killed at the Jefferson County rest area in a botched burglary by teens. As a result, Florida rest stops were either patrolled or closed for at least two years when lawmakers approved cutbacks. A number of rest areas are currently regularly patrolled at night by armed security, often private, due to a resurgence in rest area-related violent crime.

=== Hurricane Ivan ===
On September 16, 2004, Hurricane Ivan made landfall near Pensacola, with the resulting storm surge causing heavy damage to the I-10 bridge across Escambia Bay. As much as a quarter mile (400 m) of the bridge, consisting of 58 bridge segments, collapsed into the bay, and an additional 66 segments were knocked out of alignment; most of the damage was to the eastbound lanes. A $26.5 million project was awarded the following day to Gilbert Southern/Massman and to the Parsons Corporation to make emergency repairs to the bridge. Work was completed on October 4 on the westbound bridge, restoring two-way traffic seven days ahead of schedule. The more heavily damaged eastbound bridge was completely repaired on November 20, just 66 days after Hurricane Ivan made landfall, and 27 days ahead of schedule. The contractor received $1.5 million in bonuses for the early completion. The commercial truck detour sent truck traffic into Alabama and I-65 to avoid the bridges.

The causeway that carries US 90 across the northern part of the same bay was also heavily damaged.

== Exit list ==
County	Location	mi	km	Old exit	New exit	Destinations	Notes
Escambia		0.000	0.000			I-10 west – Mobile	Alabama state line (Perdido River)
Escambia		1.1	1.8	Inspection station (eastbound only)			
Escambia		2.5	4.0	–	2	SR 99 (Beulah Road)	New interchange to begin construction in mid-2025
Escambia		3.4	5.5	Weigh station			
Escambia		4.4	7.1	Florida Welcome Center (eastbound only)			
Escambia		5.523	8.888	1	5	US 90 Alt.	
Escambia	Ensley	7.092	11.413	2	7	SR 297 (Pine Forest Road) – Pensacola NAS, Perdido Key	Signed as exits 7A (south) and 7B (north) eastbound
Escambia	Ensley–Brent line	10.270	16.528	3	10	US 29 (Pensacola Boulevard) – Pensacola, Cantonment	Signed as exits 10A (south) and 10B (north) eastbound
Escambia	Ensley–Brent line	12.422	19.991	4	12	I-110 south – Pensacola, Pensacola Beach, Pensacola International Airport	Exit 6 (I-110); Northern terminus of I-110
Escambia	Ferry Pass	12.928	20.806	5	13	SR 291 (Davis Highway)	Access to West Florida Hospital, Pensacola Bay Center, and University of West Florida
Escambia	Ferry Pass	16.495	26.546	6	17	US 90 – Pensacola, Pace	
Escambia Bay		16.549– 19.166	26.633– 30.845	Escambia Bay Bridge			
Santa Rosa	Avalon Beach	21.700	34.923	7	22	SR 281 north / SR 281 south to US 90 – Milton, Gulf Breeze	Access to University of Florida - Milton and Santa Rosa Medical Center
Santa Rosa		25.946	41.756	8	26	CR 191 – Milton, Bagdad	
Santa Rosa		27.158– 27.747	43.707– 44.654	Bridge over Blackwater River			
Santa Rosa		28.415	45.730	9	28	CR 89 – Milton	Access to Santa Rosa Medical Center
Santa Rosa		30.2	48.6	Rest area			
Santa Rosa		31.265	50.316	10	31	SR 87 – Fort Walton Beach, Milton, Navarre	
Okaloosa		45.072	72.536	11	45	CR 189 – Holt	
Okaloosa	Crestview				53	P. J. Adams Parkway – Crestview	Interchange under construction
Okaloosa	Crestview	56.300	90.606	12	56	SR 85 – Crestview, Niceville, Destin	
Okaloosa		60.0	96.6	Rest area			
Walton		69.482	111.820	13	70	SR 285 – Niceville, Eglin AFB, Hurlburt Field	
Walton	DeFuniak Springs	84.587	136.130	14	85	US 331 – DeFuniak Springs, Freeport	Access to Healthmark Regional Medical Center
Holmes	Ponce de Leon	96.018	154.526	15	96	SR 81 – Ponce de Leon	Rest area in the southeast corner
Washington		104.038	167.433	16	104	CR 279 – Caryville	
Holmes	Bonifay	111.685	179.740	17	112	SR 79 – Bonifay, Panama City Beach	
Washington	Chipley	119.680	192.606	18	120	SR 77 – Chipley, Panama City	Access to Northwest Florida Community Hospital
Jackson		129.833	208.946	19	130	US 231 – Cottondale, Panama City, Dothan, AL, Montgomery, AL	
Jackson		133.2	214.4	Rest area			
Jackson	Marianna	136.441	219.581	20	136	SR 276 – Marianna	
Jackson		142.126	228.730	21	142	SR 71 – Marianna, Blountstown	Access to Jackson Hospital
Jackson		152.041	244.686	22	152	SR 69 – Grand Ridge, Blountstown	
Jackson		155.6	250.4	Weigh station			
Jackson		158.011	254.294	23	158	CR 286 – Sneads	
Apalachicola River		160.061– 161.220	257.593– 259.458	Dewey M. Johnson Bridge, Central/Eastern Time Zone boundary			
Gadsden		161.30	259.59	Rest area			
Gadsden		165.729	266.715	24	166	CR 270A – Chattahoochee	
Gadsden		174.093	280.176	25	174	SR 12 – Quincy, Gretna, Greensboro	
Gadsden		180.963	291.232	26	181	SR 267 – Quincy	Access to Capital Regional Medical Center-Gadsden Memorial Campus
Gadsden	Midway	191.949	308.912	27	192	US 90 – Midway, Quincy, Tallahassee	Access to Florida State University and Florida A&M University
Ochlockonee River		193.569– 193.798	311.519– 311.888	Bridge			
Leon		194.3	312.7	Rest area			
Leon	Tallahassee	195.731	314.999	28	196	SR 263 (Capital Circle Northwest) – Int’l Airport	To Tallahassee State College, Tallahassee Museum of History and Natural Science and Mission San Luis
Leon	Tallahassee	199.010	320.276	29	199	US 27 (Monroe Street) – State Capitol	
Leon	Tallahassee	202.678	326.179	30	203	US 319 (Capital Circle Northeast) / SR 61 (Thomasville Road)	Access to Capital Regional Medical Center
Leon	Tallahassee	206.00	331.52		206	Welaunee Boulevard	Proposed interchange
Leon	Tallahassee	208.570	335.661	31	209	US 90 – Tallahassee, Monticello	Signed as exits 209A (west) and 209B (east); Access to Florida State University and Florida A&M University
Jefferson		216.737	348.804	32	217	SR 59	
Jefferson		225.055	362.191	33	225	US 19 (FL-GA Parkway) – Monticello, Perry, Thomasville	
Jefferson		232.849	374.734	34	233	CR 257	
Jefferson		234.8	377.9	Rest area			
Madison		241.217	388.201	35	241	US 221 – Greenville, Perry	
Madison		251.520	404.782	36	251	SR 14 – Madison, Perry	
Madison		258.106	415.381	37	258	SR 53 – Madison	
Madison		261.771	421.280	38	262	CR 255 – Lee	
Madison		263.3	423.7	Weigh station			
Madison		264.9	426.3	Rest area			
Suwannee River		268.142– 268.246	431.533– 431.700	Bridge			
Suwannee		270.6	435.5	Inspection station			
Suwannee		274.642	441.993	39	275	US 90 – Live Oak, Lee	
Suwannee		282.770	455.074	40	283	US 129 – Live Oak, Jasper	Access to Shands Live Oak Regional Medical Center
Suwannee		292.127	470.133	41	292	CR 137 – Wellborn	
Suwannee		293.4	472.2	Rest area (eastbound)			
Columbia		294.4	473.8	Rest area (westbound)			
Columbia		296.199	476.686	42	296	I-75 – Tampa, Valdosta	Signed as exits 296A (south) and 296B (north); Exit 435 (I-75)
Columbia		301.293	484.884	43	301	US 41 – Lake City, White Springs	Access to Shands Lake Shore Regional Medical Center
Columbia	Lake City	303.458	488.368	44	303	US 441 – Lake City, Fargo	Access to Shands Lake Shore Regional Medical Center
Baker		317.8	511.4	Rest area			
Baker		323.827	521.149	45	324	US 90 – Sanderson, Olustee, Lake City	
Baker		326.750	525.853	46	327	CR 229 – Sanderson, Raiford	
Baker		332.782	535.561	47	333	CR 125 – Glen St. Mary	
Baker	Macclenny	335.145	539.364	48	335	SR 121 – Macclenny, Lake Butler, Gainesville	Signed as exits 335A (south) and 335B (north) westbound
Baker		336.312	541.242	49	336	SR 228 – Macclenny, Maxville	Access to Ed Fraser Memorial Hospital
Nassau	No major junctions						
Duval	Jacksonville	343.879	553.420	50	343	US 301 – Baldwin, Starke	
Duval	Jacksonville	350.370	563.866		350	SR 23 south (Cecil Commerce Center Parkway) / SR 23 north to US 90 (Beaver Street)	opened in 2010, replaced rest area, SR 23 exit 46, signed as exits 350A (south) and 350B (north) eastbound
Duval	Jacksonville–Whitehouse line	352.096	566.644	51	351	CR 115C (Chaffee Road) – Whitehouse	
Duval	Jacksonville–Marietta line				355	Hammond Boulevard	Opened June 8, 2016
Duval	Jacksonville–Marietta line	356.269	573.359	52	355	Marietta	Former right-in/right-out; replaced 2016 by Hammond Boulevard exit
Duval	Jacksonville	356.838	574.275	53	356	I-295 – Daytona Beach, Savannah	Exit 21 (I-295)
Duval	Jacksonville	357.910	576.000	54	357	SR 103 (Lane Avenue)	
Duval	Jacksonville	359.185	578.052	55	358	SR 111 (Cassat Avenue/Edgewood Avenue)	
Duval	Jacksonville	359.895	579.195	56	359	Luna Street to CR 213 (Lenox Avenue) / Highway Avenue	Westbound exit and eastbound entrance
Duval	Jacksonville	360.773	580.608	57	360	SR 129 (McDuff Avenue)	
Duval	Jacksonville	361.046	581.047	58	361	US 17 south (Roosevelt Boulevard) – NAS Jax	West end of the overlap with US 17 / SR 15 / SR 228; westbound exit and eastbound entrance
Duval	Jacksonville	361.642	582.006	59	362	Stockton Street – Riverside	Eastbound exit and entrance, westbound entrance only; access to St. Vincent's Medical Center Riverside
Duval	Jacksonville	362.057	582.674			I-95 – Jax Beaches, Daytona Beach, Downtown, Savannah	Eastern terminus of I-10; east end of the overlap with US 17 / SR 15 / SR 228; exit 351B (I-95)
1.000 mi = 1.609 km; 1.000 km = 0.621 mi: Concurrency terminus; Closed/former; Proposed; Incomplete access

Interstate 10
Previous state: Alabama	Florida	Next state: Terminus
