= Fidelis, Florida =

- Unincorporated community
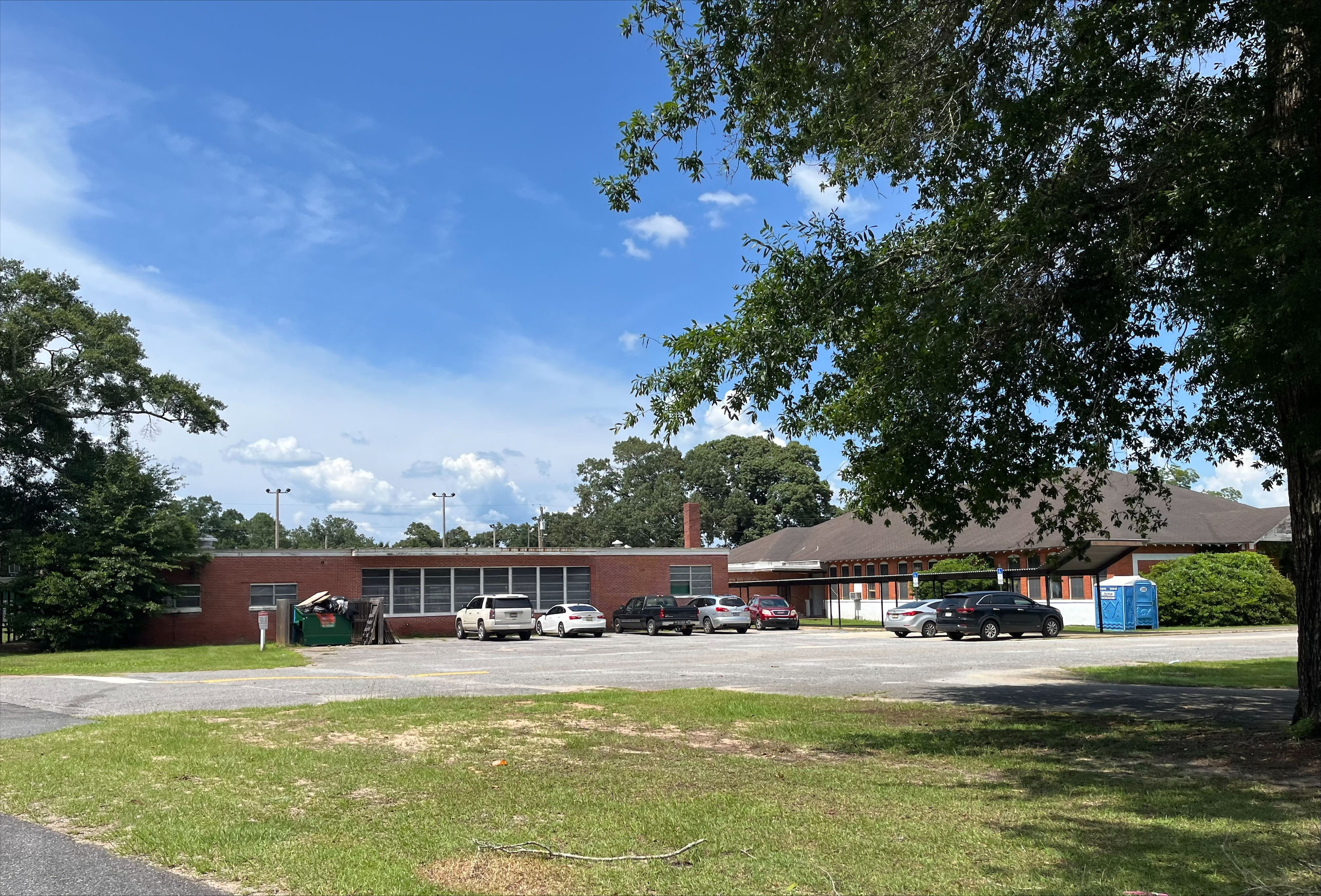
- Fidelis School

- Location within Florida Location within the United States
- Coordinates: 30°56′04″N 87°01′28″W
- Country: United States
- State: Florida
- County: Santa Rosa

Area
  - Total: 2.852 sq mi (7.39 km^{2})
  - Land: 2.836 sq mi (7.35 km^{2})
  - Water: 0.016 sq mi (0.041 km^{2})
- Elevation: 253 ft (77 m)

Population (2020)
  - Total: 137
  - Density: 48.3/sq mi (18.7/km^{2})
- Time zone: UTC-6 (Central (CST))
  - Summer (DST): UTC-5 (CDT)
- ZIP code: 32565
- Area code: 850
- GNIS feature ID: 2629313

Fidelis is an unincorporated community and census-designated place in Santa Rosa County, Florida, United States. Its population was 137 at the 2020 census, down from 156 as of the 2010 census. It is part of the Pensacola—Ferry Pass—Brent, Florida Metropolitan Statistical Area. Florida State Road 87 passes through the community.

The Fidelis School was listed on the National Register of Historic Places in 2021. The building was constructed in 1925 and served as a school until the 1980s. It then served as a community center and church before being abandoned.

== History ==
Fidelis was originally founded as Semper Fidelis (latin for "always faithful") in the latter half of the nineteenth century. A post office was established in 1890, however, it would close the following year. A predecessor school to Fidelis School, called Semper Fidelis, would be established in 1897.

Fidelis historically had an agricultural economy, being home to Noah Hopkin's Cotton Gin, several gristmalls, and numerous farms. Fidelis was also the site of the McLean Sawmill.

== Geography ==
According to the U.S. Census Bureau, the community has an area of 2.852 square miles (7.39 km^{2}); 2.836 square miles (7.35 km^{2}) of its area is land, and 0.016 square miles (0.041 km^{2}) is water.

== Demographics ==
Fidelis first appeared as a census designated place in the 2010 U.S. census.
