= Peter Prince Field =

Airport in Florida, U.S.

Coordinates: 30°38′15.435″N 086°59′37.15″W

- IATA: none; ICAO: none; FAA LID: 2R4

Summary
- Airport type: Public use
- Owner: Santa Rosa County, Admin Ct
- Operator: Jared Lowe
- Serves: Milton, Florida
- Location: Santa Rosa County, Florida
- Elevation AMSL: 82 ft / 25 m
- Interactive map of Peter Prince Field

Runways
Direction	Length		Surface
Direction	ft	m	Surface
18/36	3,703	1,129	Asphalt

Statistics (2018)
- Aircraft operations (year ending 3/7/2018): 93,950
- Based aircraft: 146
- Source: Federal Aviation Administration

Peter Prince Field (FAA LID: 2R4) is a public-use airport located 3 miles (4.8 km) east of the central business district of the city of Milton in Santa Rosa County, Florida, United States. The airport is publicly owned.

== See also ==
- List of airports in Florida
