= Florida State Road 4A =

Florida State Road 4A may refer to:

- Florida State Road 4A (pre-1945), a number of old alignments of US 1 in the Florida Keys still known locally as 4A
- County Road 4A (Florida), several spurs of the post-1945 SR 4
