= Florida State Road 281 =

State highway in Florida, United States

State Road 281
- Avalon Boulevard
- SR 281 highlighted in red

Route information
- Maintained by FDOT, Santa Rosa Bay Bridge Authority
- Length: 15.971 mi (25.703 km)

Major junctions
- South end: US 98 near Gulf Breeze
- I-10 near Ferry Pass
- North end: US 90 near Milton

Location
- Country: United States
- State: Florida
- Counties: Santa Rosa

Highway system
- Florida State Highway System; Interstate; US; State; Former; Pre‑1945; Toll; Scenic
← SR 277	→ SR 285

State Road 281 (SR 281), known locally as Avalon Boulevard, is a north–south highway in Santa Rosa County, Florida. It runs from U.S. Highway 98 (Gulf Breeze Parkway) east of Gulf Breeze north to U.S. Highway 90 just west of Milton. The portion of the road south of Interstate 10 is signed "TOLL 281" to reflect the inclusion of the Garcon Point Bridge, which has a $5.00 per crossing toll.

The primary function of SR 281 is as a bypass route of Pensacola, connecting Milton, Gulf Breeze, Pensacola Beach and other communities along the coast to I-10.

== Major intersections ==
The entire route is in Santa Rosa County.

Location	mi	km	Destinations	Notes
	0.000	0.000	US 98 (SR 30) – Navarre Beach, Fort Walton Beach, Okaloosa Island, Gulf Breeze, Pensacola Beach, Pensacola, Zoo	
	0.887– 4.377	1.427– 7.044	Garcon Point Bridge over East Bay	
	7.090	11.410	CR 191 north (Garcon Point Road)	
	11.03	17.75	I-10 (SR 8) – Pensacola, Tallahassee	I-10 exit 22
	11.729	18.876	CR 281 north (Del Monte Street)	
	13.767	22.156	CR 281B west (Cyanamid Road)	
	14.591	23.482	CR 191A south (Mulat Road)	
	15.934	25.643	CR 191 east (Old Bagdad Highway) – Bagdad	northbound exit only
	15.971	25.703	US 90 (SR 10) – Milton, Pace	
1.000 mi = 1.609 km; 1.000 km = 0.621 mi: Electronic toll collection; Incomplete access
