= Whitfield, Florida =

Whitfield is the name of two places in Florida:

- Whitfield, Manatee County, Florida, an unincorporated community and census-designated place
- Whitfield, Santa Rosa County, Florida, an unincorporated community and census-designated place
