= Milton station (Florida) =

- Louisville and Nashville Depot
- U.S. National Register of Historic Places
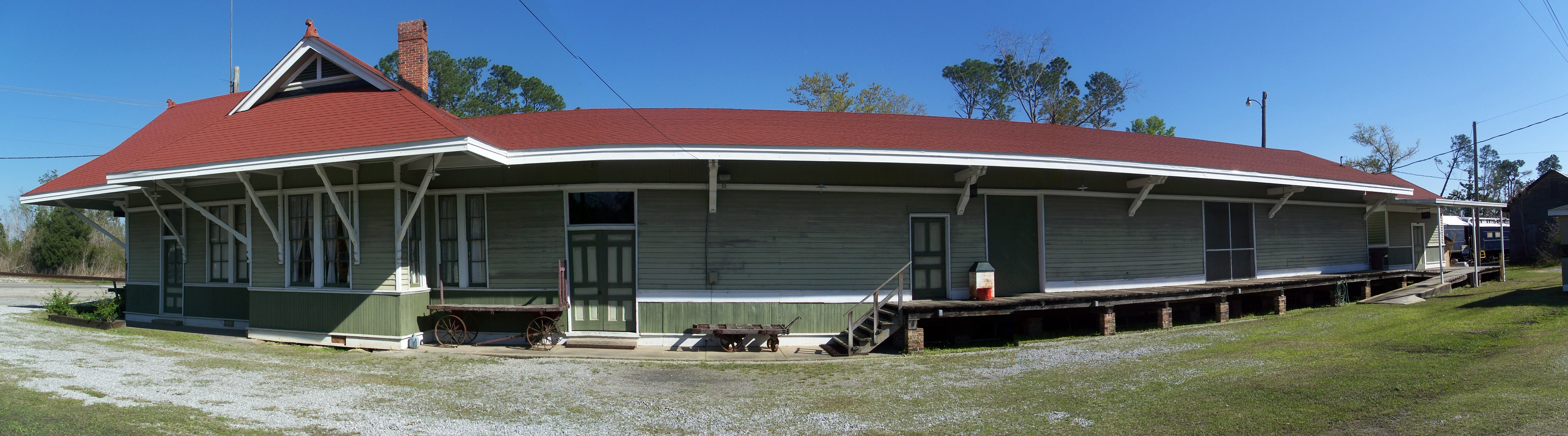

- Location within Florida Location within the United States
- Location: Milton, Florida
- Coordinates: 30°37′14″N 87°2′2″W
- Built: 1909
- Architect: L & N Engineering Department
- NRHP reference No.: 82001041
- Added to NRHP: October 29, 1982

The Louisville and Nashville Depot is an historic Louisville and Nashville Railroad depot located at 5003 Henry Street in Milton, Santa Rosa County, Florida. It was built in 1909 on the site of the former Pensacola and Atlantic depot built in 1882 which burned down in 1907. In 1973, the station was closed, but partially restored with a 1976 Bicentennial grant.

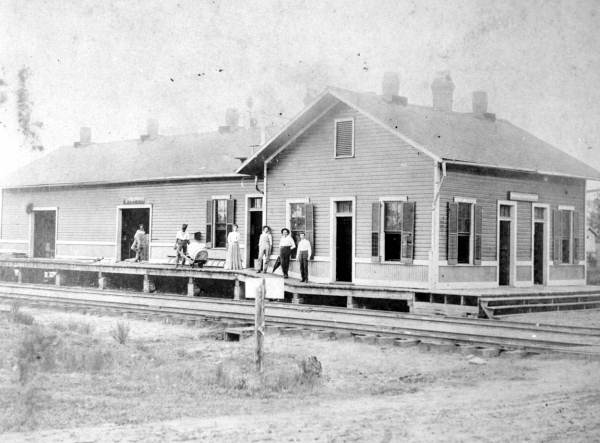
The old P&A Depot, circa 1905.

On October 29, 1982, it was added to the U.S. National Register of Historic Places. In 1989, the depot was listed in A Guide to Florida's Historic Architecture.

Today the building is owned by the Santa Rosa Historical Society.

== West Florida Railroad Museum ==
The West Florida Railroad Museum opened in the depot in 1989, and contains a collection of preserved railroad cars and railroad memorabilia from the L & N Railroad, Frisco Railroad and other railroads. The type of railroad car displays include two dining cars, two former Pullman Company sleeper cars that were renovated into L&N baggage-dormitory cars, two caboose cars, a boxcar and a flatcar. The museum also features a bridge tender's house from the Escambia Bay trestle bridge, and a section shed with motor car.

The museum sponsors two model railroad clubs: the West Florida Model Railroad Club and the Emerald Coast Garden Railway Club.

Preceding station	Louisville and Nashville Railroad	Following station
Galt City toward Myrtlewood	Myrtlewood – Chattahoochee	Holts toward Chattahoochee

== Gallery ==
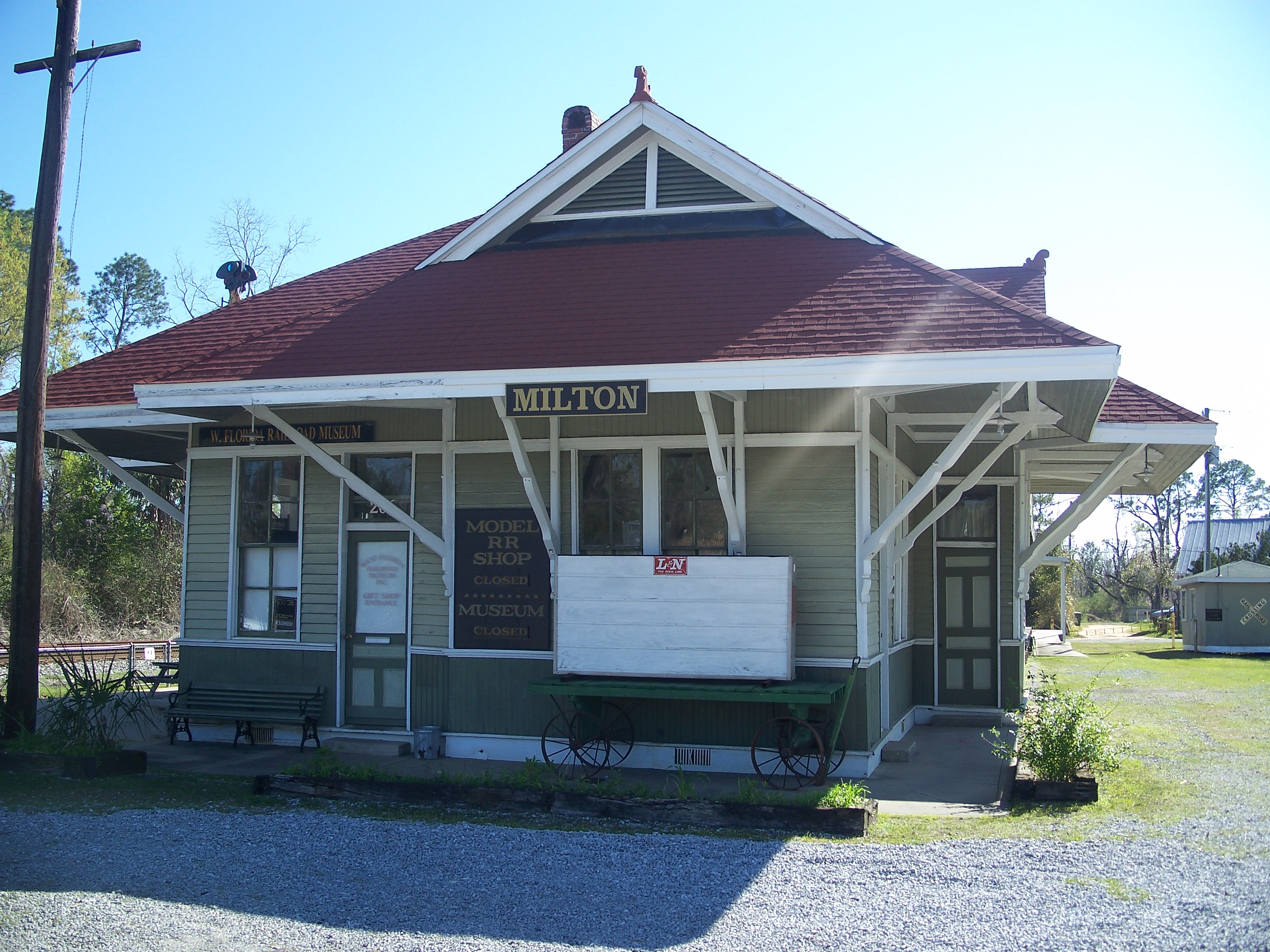

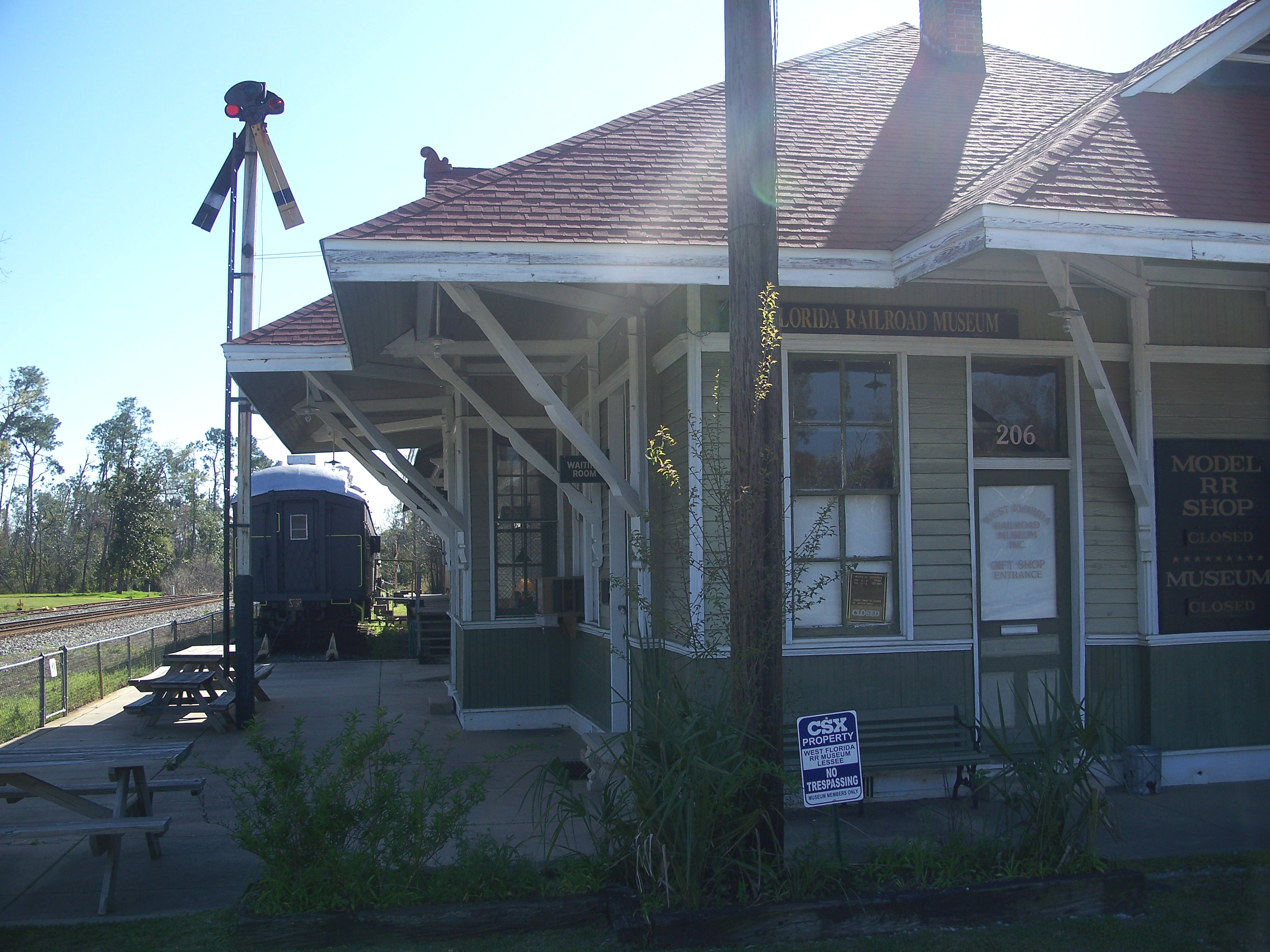

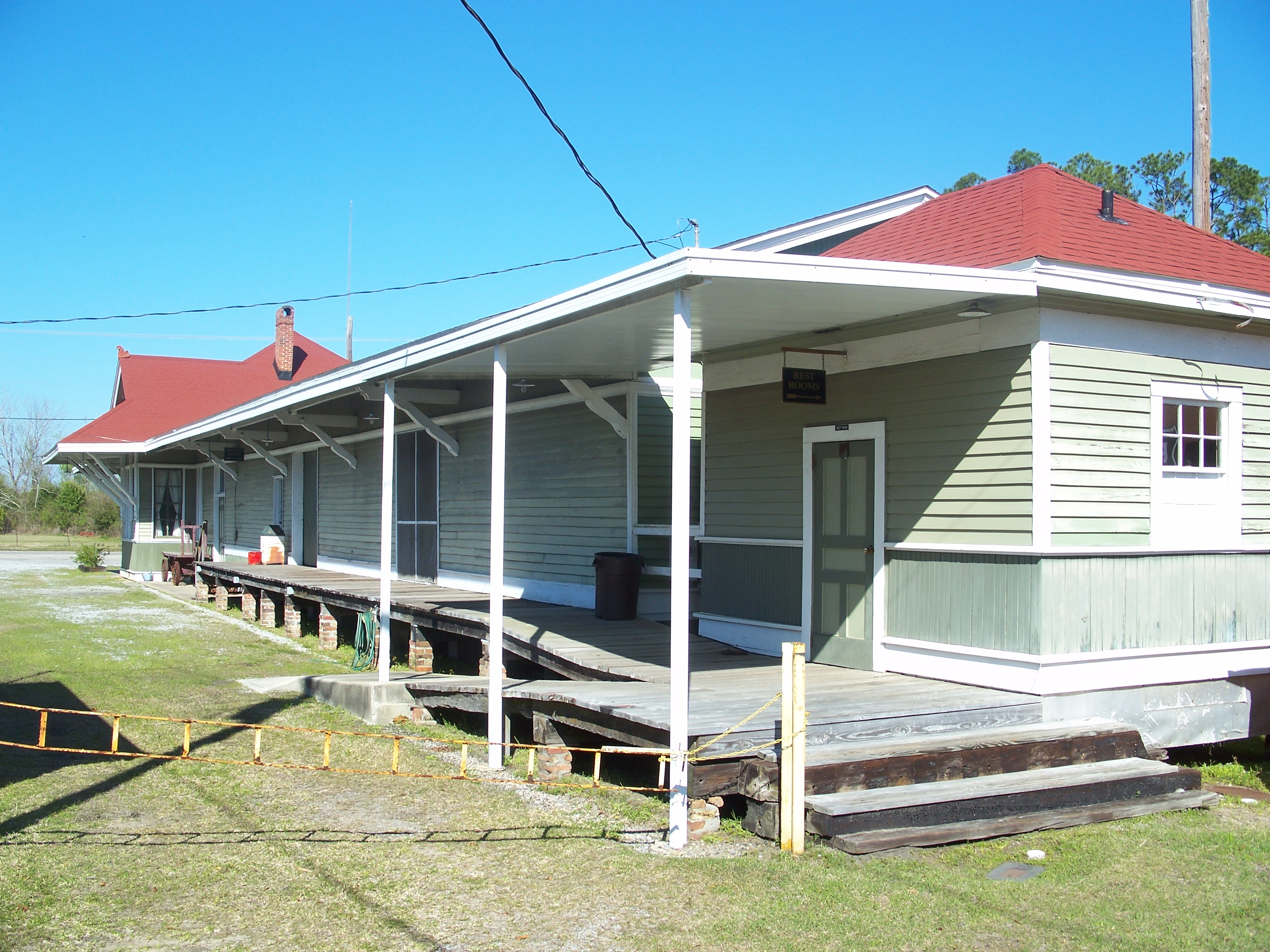
