= Florida State Road 4 =

State highway in Florida, United States

State Road 4
- SR 4 highlighted in red

Route information
- Maintained by FDOT
- Length: 43.705 mi (70.336 km)
- Existed: 1945–present

Major junctions
- West end: US 29 in Century
- SR 89 in Jay; SR 87 near Berrydale; SR 189 in Baker
- East end: US 90 in Milligan

Location
- Country: United States
- State: Florida
- Counties: Escambia, Santa Rosa, Okaloosa

Highway system
- Florida State Highway System; Interstate; US; State; Former; Pre‑1945; Toll; Scenic
← I-4	→ SR 5

State Road 4 (SR 4) is a 43.705-mile-long (70.336 km) two-lane state highway in Escambia, Santa Rosa, and Okaloosa counties in the western corner of the Florida Panhandle. It is signed east–west, but the road is slightly diagonal. The road runs from Century near the Alabama state line at an intersection with U.S. Highway 29 (US 29), to the farming community of Milligan at an intersection with US 90.

The road cuts through the Blackwater River State Forest. It crosses the Escambia River, West Fork Big Coldwater Creek, Juniper Creek, Manning Creek, East Fork Big Coldwater Creek, Cedar Creek, Beaver Creek, the Blackwater River, and Penny Creek, all part of the Blackwater River basin (except for the Escambia River).

== Route description ==
SR 4 heads slightly southeast from its western terminus at US 29 and SR 95 in Century in Escambia County, just south of the border with Alabama, and crosses the Escambia River into Santa Rosa County less than 2 miles (3.2 km) into its journey. The road then turns and runs east into Jay, where it intersects with SR 89. SR 4 continues east, then gradually turns southeast to its intersection with SR 87, before turning mostly east again and running through Blackwater River State Park.

Shortly before reaching the eastern edge of the state park, formed by the Blackwater River, the road crosses into Okaloosa County and turns southeast again to its intersection with SR 189 in Baker, where it briefly turns sharply south. Curving back to the southeast, the road finds its eastern terminus at US 90/SR 10 in Milligan, just southwest of Crestview.

The Florida Department of Transportation annual average daily traffic (AADT) numbers for 2012 show an average of 4,300 vehicles on the Escambia County portion of the road and into Santa Rosa County to Jay, decreasing sharply to 2,600 and then 1,300 vehicles as the road approached its intersection with SR 87. From SR 87 into Okaloosa County the averages increase slightly again to 1,600 per day, and then rise sharply to a high of 7,900 vehicles as SR 4 approaches its eastern terminus from SR 189 to US 90/SR 10.

== History ==
A 1922 map of Florida auto trails shows an auto trail running from McDavid, south of Century, through Munson, a few miles west of the Okaloosa County line, and then to Baker and Milligan. It appears that the portion of today's SR 4 from Munson (starting at mile 25.932) to its eastern terminus corresponds to this 1922 auto trail.

In 1935, the current routing of SR 4, from Century in Escambia County into Santa Rosa County, then from Jay through Berrydale to Munson, and east into Okaloosa County, was signed as SR 62, and labeled as a third-class road, which indicates a pavement type of just above a trail, but below bituminous surface conditions. In Okaloosa County, SR 62 runs into Baker as third-class road, but the final stretch from Barker To Milligan had already been improved to a second-class surface.

By 1955, SR 4 is being shown as a bituminous road with its start at the intersection with SR 97 west of Century, traveling east, then sharing a concurrency with US 29 heading north through Century, and then heading southeast on today's routing into and through Santa Rosa County. This path west of Century corresponds to today's County Road 4. By 1960, the Okaloosa portion of SR 4 was also bituminous, and the routing of SR 4 extended on what is today known as County Road 4, or Antioch Road, south from Milligan to its terminus on SR 85 south of Crestview. Only about half of this extension was bituminous, to just north of what became I-10, while the southeastern portion of the road was graded and drained, but not surfaced.

This road was the State of Governevver Lawton Chiles 1000 miles walking tour On maps from 1977 and 1978, the routing of SR 4 west of Century had been re-signed as County Road 4, while the current routing of SR 4 from its western terminus into and through Santa Rosa County had been paved in hard surface. By 1985, the extension of SR 4 south of Milligan had also been re-signed as County Road 4.

== Major intersections ==
County	Location	mi	km	Destinations	Notes
Escambia	Century	0.000	0.000	US 29 (SR 95) – Pensacola, Flomaton	Western terminus
Santa Rosa	Jay	7.340	11.813	SR 89 south / CR 197 north (Alabama Street) – Milton	west end of SR 89 overlap
Santa Rosa	Jay	7.527	12.114	SR 89 north – Brewton	east end of SR 89 overlap
Santa Rosa		9.029	14.531	CR 399 north (Tractor Trail)	west end of CR 399 overlap
Santa Rosa		9.522	15.324	CR 399 south (Country Mill Road)	east end of CR 399 overlap
Santa Rosa		11.485	18.483	CR 87A north (Market Road)	
Santa Rosa		12.896	20.754	CR 164 south (Greenwood Road)	
Santa Rosa		15.634	25.160	SR 87 – Brewton, Milton	
Santa Rosa	Munson	25.981	41.812	CR 191 (Munson Highway) – Milton	
Okaloosa		36.131	58.147	CR 4A east (Market Road)	
Okaloosa	Baker	39.113	62.946	SR 189 north – Andalusia	
Okaloosa	Baker	39.994	64.364	CR 189 south (Galliver Cutoff)	
Okaloosa	Milligan	43.705	70.336	US 90 (SR 10) – Crestview, Holt	Eastern terminus
1.000 mi = 1.609 km; 1.000 km = 0.621 mi: Concurrency terminus

== Related routes ==
=== Escambia County ===
County Road 4
- Location: Walnut Hill-Century
- Length: 13.350 mi (21.485 km)

County Road 4 is a county extension of SR 4 in Escambia County that runs from SR 97 east of Walnut Hill to US 29 in Century. North of the eastern terminus, it runs along a hidden concurrency with US 29 to the western terminus of State Road 4.

==== County Road 4A ====
County Road 4A
- Location: Century and vicinity
- Length: 6.005 mi (9.664 km)

County Road 4A is a suffixed alternate county road that begins west of Century in northeastern Escambia County. The road begins as an extension of Byrneville Road north of CR 4, and curves to the right where it replaces County Road 168 as the route for State Line Road, as it enters Century. A spur of the road runs southeast towards US 29/SR 4 at the intersection of Front Street.

=== Okaloosa County ===
County Road 4
- Location: Milligan-Crestview
- Length: 3.022 mi (4.863 km)

County Road 4 is an extension of SR 4 in Okaloosa County known as Antioch Road. It spans from a secret overlap with US 90/SR 4 east of Milligan southeast toward State Road 85 in southern Crestview, Florida.

==== County Road 4A ====
County Road 4A
- Location: Baker
- Length: 2.519 mi (4.054 km)

County Road 4A is a suffixed alternate county road north of Baker in northwestern Okaloosa County of the U.S. state of Florida. It spans east from SR 4 to SR 189, where it then becomes a local street name Holloway Road.

==== County Road 4B ====
County Road 4B
- Location: Baker
- Length: 1.207 mi (1.942 km)

County Road 4B or Charlie Day Road is another suffixed alternate county road, except this one is south of Baker. The road runs from CR 189 east to SR 4.
