= Jay, Florida =

- Town
- Location in Santa Rosa County and the state of Florida
- Coordinates: 30°57′01″N 87°09′08″W
- Country: United States
- State: Florida
- County: Santa Rosa
- Settled (Cobb Old Field): c. 1822-1890s
- Settled (Pine Level): c. 1890s-1902
- Unincorporated (Jay): 1902-1951
- Incorporated (Town of Jay): 1951

Government
  - Type: Mayor-Council
  - Mayor: Shon Owens
  - Councilors: Brent Freeman, Cade Diamond, Nina Hendricks, and Michael Hutto
  - Town Manager: Eric Seib
  - Town Clerk: Donna Bullock
  - Town Attorney: Stephen M. Cozart

Area
  - Total: 1.66 sq mi (4.30 km^{2})
  - Land: 1.66 sq mi (4.30 km^{2})
  - Water: 0 sq mi (0.00 km^{2})
- Elevation: 262 ft (80 m)

Population (2020)
  - Total: 524
  - Density: 315.6/sq mi (121.87/km^{2})
- Time zone: UTC-6 (Central (CST))
  - Summer (DST): UTC-5 (CDT)
- ZIP code: 32565
- Area code(s): 850, 448
- FIPS code: 12-35425
- GNIS feature ID: 2405907
- Website: www.townofjayfl.com

Jay is a town in Santa Rosa County, Florida, United States. Located in the Florida Panhandle in North Florida, it is part of the Pensacola–Ferry Pass–Brent, Florida Metropolitan Statistical Area. The population was 524 at the 2020 census, down from 533 at the 2010 census.

== History ==
=== 19th century ===
In 1821, Spain formally yielded possession of Spanish Florida to the United States and it became the Florida Territory in 1822. Santa Rosa County was created in 1842, three years before Florida became a state in 1845. The Town of Jay was known in the early 1800s as "Cobb Old Field", but was later known as "Pine Level". It is located about 38 miles north of Pensacola and 27 miles north of Milton, Florida, and about 3 miles from the Escambia County, Alabama, state line.

The Jernigan family were among some of the earliest pioneers in the "Pine Level" area of Santa Rosa County. Among them were such settlers as Van Jernigan, who arrived when Florida was still a territory. His homestead near the headbank at the southern bend of Cobb Creek was located on the eastern side of Milton-Pollard Road. As with many residents of the area, Jernigan's occupation was in the timber and logging industry. He also owned one of the area's largest range cattle herds, descendants of which continued to roam on the open range even many years after his death. Jerningan's estate sold them sometime in the 1890s.

Eldridge Jernigan was another member of the Jernigan family who was an early settler in the area. He later moved to the nearby community of Mount Carmel.

=== 20th century ===
In 1902, a committee was formed to select a name for the thriving farming community. James "Jay" Thomas Nowling submitted the name "Pine Level" but it was declined due to another Florida post office already using that same name. Nowling was asked to submit a second name and was turned down again due to the name being too long. He was asked to submit yet another name but the United States Postal Service decided to name the new post office after his nickname ("Jay") before he was able to submit another name, and then Nowling became the first postmaster for the community that now had his namesake.

In 1922, at least 175 African-American residents of Jay left in a mass exodus after a fight between a black and a white farmer, leaving a legacy of Jay being known as a sundown town. In a 1974 Tampa Bay Times article, the then-mayor of Jay, J.D. Bray said: "The sun doesn't set on a colored man in Jay, ... Come 4 o'clock, they're gone. They were run out of here back in the days of the turpentine still. And they know better than to come in here." According to the US Census in 2010 and in 2020, the town still had only four African-American residents, but that was up from just two Black citizens on the 2000 US Census.

The Town of Jay was officially incorporated as a municipality in 1951.

== Geography ==
The town of Jay is located in northwest Santa Rosa County.

According to the United States Census Bureau, the town has a total area of 1.6 square miles (4.1 km^{2}), all land. The town lies on high ground on the east bank of the Escambia River.

There are two river access points/boat ramps, both outside the city limits.

=== Climate ===
The climate in this area is characterized by hot, humid summers and generally mild winters. According to the Köppen climate classification, the Town of Jay has a humid subtropical climate zone (Cfa).

Climate data for Jay, Florida
Month	Jan	Feb	Mar	Apr	May	Jun	Jul	Aug	Sep	Oct	Nov	Dec	Year
Mean daily maximum °C (°F)	17 (62)	18 (65)	22 (72)	26 (78)	30 (86)	32 (90)	33 (91)	33 (91)	31 (88)	27 (80)	22 (71)	18 (64)	26 (78)
Mean daily minimum °C (°F)	4 (39)	6 (42)	9 (48)	12 (54)	17 (62)	20 (68)	21 (70)	21 (70)	19 (66)	13 (55)	8 (46)	5 (41)	13 (55)
Average precipitation mm (inches)	130 (5.3)	76 (3)	160 (6.2)	120 (4.8)	110 (4.2)	190 (7.3)	200 (7.8)	170 (6.5)	150 (6)	97 (3.8)	120 (4.6)	120 (4.9)	1,690 (66.5)
Average precipitation days	11	9	10	7	8	11	15	13	10	6	8	9	117
Source: Weatherbase

== Demographics ==
Historical population
Census	Pop.	Note	%±
1950	547		—
1960	672		22.9%
1970	646		−3.9%
1980	633		−2.0%
1990	666		5.2%
2000	579		−13.1%
2010	533		−7.9%
2020	524		−1.7%
U.S. Decennial Census

=== 2010 and 2020 census ===
Jay racial composition (Hispanics excluded from racial categories) (NH = Non-Hispanic)
Race	Pop 2010	Pop 2020	% 2010	% 2020
White (NH)	504	454	94.56%	86.64%
Black or African American (NH)	4	4	0.75%	0.76%
Native American or Alaska Native (NH)	5	12	0.94%	2.29%
Asian (NH)	5	10	0.94%	1.91%
Pacific Islander or Native Hawaiian (NH)	0	2	0.00%	0.38%
Some other race (NH)	0	1	0.00%	0.19%
Two or more races/Multiracial (NH)	4	34	0.75%	6.49%
Hispanic or Latino (any race)	11	7	2.06%	1.34%
Total	533	524	100.00%	100.00%

As of the 2020 United States census, there were 524 people, 217 households, and 142 families residing in the town.

As of the 2010 United States census, there were 533 people, 289 households, and 203 families residing in the town.

=== 2000 census ===
As of the census of 2000, there were 579 people, 230 households, and 147 families residing in the town. The population density was 365.8 inhabitants per square mile (141.2/km^{2}). There were 278 housing units at an average density of 175.6 per square mile (67.8/km^{2}). The racial makeup of the town was 97.58% White, 0.35% African American, 1.21% Native American, 0.17% Asian, and 0.69% from two or more races. Hispanic or Latino of any race were 1.90% of the population.

In 2000, there were 230 households, out of which 31.3% had children under the age of 18 living with them, 45.7% were married couples living together, 12.6% had a female householder with no husband present, and 35.7% were non-families. 31.7% of all households were made up of individuals, and 13.0% had someone living alone who was 65 years of age or older. The average household size was 2.43 and the average family size was 3.07.

In 2000, in the town, the population was spread out, with 24.5% under the age of 18, 7.3% from 18 to 24, 25.2% from 25 to 44, 26.8% from 45 to 64, and 16.2% who were 65 years of age or older. The median age was 40 years. For every 100 females, there were 91.7 males. For every 100 females age 18 and over, there were 86.8 males.

In 2000, the median income for a household in the town was $23,500, and the median income for a family was $40,250. Males had a median income of $26,719 versus $21,500 for females. The per capita income for the town was $13,949. About 13.8% of families and 16.5% of the population were below the poverty line, including 23.9% of those under age 18 and 12.9% of those age 65 or over.

== Industry ==
Jay is a farming community, with cotton, soybeans, peanuts and hay being major crops. A small group of farmers began a livestock market there in 1940, with sales reaching $1 million within 10 years, but the market closed near the turn of the century.

Oil was discovered in Jay in 1970. The Jay oilfield has approximately 67 oil wells - eleven within the town limits. Royalties from the oil have exceeded $400 million that funded a new city hall, fire department and recreation complex. Jay is also the site of the Jay oil field, which has produced over 330 million barrels since its discovery in 1970, but is now toward the end of its producing life. A small refinery is located off State Road 4. The refinery has had several owners since the 1970s—ExxonMobil sold the refinery to Quantum Resources Management LLC Quantum Energy Partners : Quantum Resources, LP March 2004. In January 2009, Quantum announced that they were ceasing production at the facility due to poor economics, and has terminated roughly half of the plant employees. Quantum resumed production shortly thereafter when oil prices increased.

== Services ==
Jay has a combined elementary and middle school (grades K–6), and a combined middle-high school (grades 7–12). There are several banks and credit unions. There is one grocery store and one traffic light. The nearest Walmart stores are in Brewton, Alabama or Pace, Florida. There are several private airstrips, and the nearest commercial-service passenger airport is the Pensacola International Airport (approximately 40 miles SSW).

Jay Hospital is a 55-bed general hospital located in northern Santa Rosa County serving the residents of Jay and the surrounding areas of Century, Flomaton, and other communities in the northwest Florida-south Alabama region.

The Santa Rosa County Library System operates a branch in Jay.

== Infrastructure ==
Jay is served by two main state highways: State Road 4, running east and west, and State Road 89, running north and south. The town and immediate surrounding communities are about two hundred seventy-five feet above sea level.

There is no railroad or bus service available in Jay, Florida.

== Notable people ==
- Brian Girard James, professional wrestler also known as "The Road Dogg" Jesse James
- Jackie Moore, Major League Baseball Manager, coach and player. Managed the Oakland Athletics 1984–1986
- Thomas Brent "Boo" Weekley, golfer
- John Robert "Bob" Zellner, American civil rights activist, subject of the 2020 biographical drama Son of the South.

== See also ==
- List of sundown towns in the United States
