= New York, Florida =

- Unincorporated community
- Location within Florida
- Coordinates: 30°50′19″N 87°12′03″W
- Country: United States
- State: Florida
- County: Santa Rosa
- Elevation: 230 ft (70 m)
- Time zone: UTC-6 (Central (CST))
  - Summer (DST): UTC-5 (CDT)
- Area code: 850
- GNIS feature ID: 294865

New York is an unincorporated community in Santa Rosa County, Florida, United States. The community is 17 miles (27 km) north-northwest of Milton.

New York got its name from a small store run by Willy Penton (1893–1928). The only known crime in the community's history was the theft of a garden plow in 1976.
