= Allentown, Florida =

- Unincorporated community
- Location of Allentown in Santa Rosa County, Florida.
- Coordinates: 30°45′46″N 87°04′56″W
- Country: United States
- State: Florida
- County: Santa Rosa
- First settled: c. 1842

Area
  - Total: 30.459 sq mi (78.89 km^{2})
  - Land: 30.233 sq mi (78.30 km^{2})
  - Water: 0.226 sq mi (0.59 km^{2})
- Elevation: 197 ft (60 m)

Population (2020)
  - Total: 1,023
  - Density: 33.84/sq mi (13.06/km^{2})
- Time zone: UTC-6 (Central (CST))
  - Summer (DST): UTC-5 (CDT)
- Area code: 850
- GNIS feature ID: 2583322

Allentown is an unincorporated community and census-designated place in Santa Rosa County, Florida, United States. Its population was 1,023 at the 2020 census, up from 894 as of the 2010 census. It is part of the Pensacola—Ferry Pass—Brent, Florida Metropolitan Statistical Area.

State Road 87 (SR 87), SR 89, and County Road 182 (CR 182) pass through the community. The intersection of CR 182 and SR 89 is typically referred by locals as "downtown Allentown" or simply "the caution light."

Central School and the local volunteer fire department are located in Allentown. There are two small churches within the community. Navy T-6 Training planes are frequently heard overhead due to the close proximity of NAS Whiting Field to the east.

== History ==
Allentown was founded in around 1842 by Floridatown resident, former Sheriff of Escambia County, and first Sheriff of Santa Rosa County Jesse Carter Allen (1811-1892). Allen homesteaded in the region after a Yellow Fever outbreak. Another pioneer of the area was Ben Jernigan, a sawmill operator. John Botts and W.W. Harrison (second Sheriff of Santa Rosa County) were also among the earliest settlers in the area.

Allentown largest industry early on was lumber. Robinson Point and Bay Point Lumber Companies owned large land areas. Sheep and cattle are also large industries in the area.

== Geography ==
According to the U.S. Census Bureau, the community has an area of 30.459 square miles (78.89 km^{2}); 30.233 square miles (78.30 km^{2}) of its area is land, and 0.226 square miles (0.59 km^{2}) is water.

== Demographics ==
Historical population
Census	Pop.	Note	%±
2010	894		—
2020	1,023		14.4%
U.S. Decennial Census

Allentown first appeared as a census designated place in the 2010 U.S. census.

=== Racial and ethnic composition ===
Allentown CDP, Florida – Racial and ethnic composition Note: the US Census treats Hispanic/Latino as an ethnic category. This table excludes Latinos from the racial categories and assigns them to a separate category. Hispanics/Latinos may be of any race.
Race / Ethnicity (NH = Non-Hispanic)	Pop 2010	Pop 2020	% 2010	% 2020
White alone (NH)	825	858	92.28%	83.87%
Black or African American alone (NH)	16	7	1.79%	0.68%
Native American or Alaska Native alone (NH)	15	17	1.68%	1.66%
Asian alone (NH)	3	6	0.34%	0.59%
Native Hawaiian or Pacific Islander alone (NH)	0	7	0.00%	0.68%
Other race alone (NH)	0	2	0.00%	0.20%
Mixed race or Multiracial (NH)	18	97	2.01%	9.48%
Hispanic or Latino (any race)	17	29	1.90%	2.83%
Total	894	1,023	100.00%	100.00%

=== 2020 census ===
As of the 2020 census, Allentown had a population of 1,023. The median age was 47.1 years. 21.4% of residents were under the age of 18 and 19.9% of residents were 65 years of age or older. For every 100 females there were 94.5 males, and for every 100 females age 18 and over there were 91.9 males age 18 and over.

0.0% of residents lived in urban areas, while 100.0% lived in rural areas.

There were 403 households in Allentown, of which 28.5% had children under the age of 18 living in them. Of all households, 51.9% were married-couple households, 18.9% were households with a male householder and no spouse or partner present, and 25.1% were households with a female householder and no spouse or partner present. About 28.8% of all households were made up of individuals and 15.6% had someone living alone who was 65 years of age or older.

There were 438 housing units, of which 8.0% were vacant. The homeowner vacancy rate was 1.1% and the rental vacancy rate was 13.9%.

Racial composition as of the 2020 census
Race	Number	Percent
White	871	85.1%
Black or African American	8	0.8%
American Indian and Alaska Native	21	2.1%
Asian	6	0.6%
Native Hawaiian and Other Pacific Islander	7	0.7%
Some other race	10	1.0%
Two or more races	100	9.8%
