= Santa Rosa Medical Center =

Hospital in Milton, Florida, US

Coordinates: 30.6342°N 87.06708°W

- Community Health Systems

Geography
- Location: Milton, Florida, United States

Organization
- Care system: Community Health Systems

Services
- Beds: 129

Links
- Website: www.srmcfl.com
- Lists: Hospitals in Florida

Santa Rosa Medical Center (SRMC) is an American 129-bed general hospital located in the small Florida city of Milton. SRMC is the primary provider of hospital-based healthcare services and emergency medicine in Santa Rosa County, Florida. The main hospital campus is located at 6002 Berryhill Road, Milton, FL 32570. The facility is leased and managed by Community Health Systems (CHS), a large U.S. healthcare company based in Franklin, Tennessee.

SRMC, along with its affiliated health services facilities and clinics, is one of the largest employers in Santa Rosa County, employing nearly 700 staff and volunteers, over 200 physicians.

== History ==
A group of Santa Rosa County citizens formed a County Hospital Board in 1951 which filed a Certificate of Organization for what would eventually become the Santa Rosa Medical Center. The initial hospital, known as Santa Rosa Hospital, was chartered as a non-profit hospital, to be operated and managed by the county. Construction began in mid-1951, and on December 2, 1952, the first patients were admitted. The hospital was located on Stewart Street in Milton. It was expanded in 1963 and again in 1966. According to the hospital's website, local growth and population needs were exceeding the capabilities of the 100-bed facility by 1970. The Santa Rosa Hospital Board of Directors and the Santa Rosa County Commissioners began drafting proposals for a new hospital on a new site.

The proposed 4-floor facility included over 100,000 square feet (9,300 m^{2}) of diagnostic and treatment space. Funding was acquired and construction began at the hospital's current Berryhill Road location in Milton. The new $4.5 million, 153-bed county-owned facility opened in December 1972 with approximately 300 employees. In 1985, the county leased the management of the hospital to the for-profit corporation, Hospital Corporation of America, Inc. and the name was changed to the Santa Rosa Medical Center. Since then, the several firms have leased and managed the facility. The facility has been managed by CHS, since the company purchased Health Management Associates, Inc. in 2013.

According to the hospital's website, the facility holds several accreditations and its employed physicians group, Santa Rosa Medical Group, offers multiple specialty care service lines, including: cardiology, urology, family medicine, obstetrics & gynecology, neurology, pulmonology, orthopedics, general surgery, allergy and ENT services.
