= Milligan, Florida =

- Unincorporated community
- Location within Florida
- Coordinates: 30°45′09″N 86°38′27″W
- Country: United States
- State: Florida
- County: Okaloosa
- Elevation: 108 ft (33 m)
- Time zone: UTC-6 (Central (CST))
  - Summer (DST): UTC-5 (CDT)
- ZIP code: 32531
- Area code: 850
- GNIS feature ID: 286927

Milligan is an unincorporated community in Okaloosa County, Florida, United States. Milligan is located at the junction of U.S. Route 90, (State Road 10) and State Road 4, 4 miles (6.4 km) west-southwest of Crestview.

From June 3, 1915 (when Okaloosa County was formed) until the Yellow River flooded in 1917, Milligan was the county seat.

== Notable people ==
- Joe Fuller - NFL player
- Houston McTear - World record holder, 100-yard dash
- Maulty Moore - NFL player
