= Whitfield, Santa Rosa County, Florida =

Whitfield, Florida
- Unincorporated community
- Location within Florida Location within the United States
- Coordinates: 30°52′55″N 87°03′09″W
- Country: United States
- State: Florida
- County: Santa Rosa

Area
  - Total: 4.190 sq mi (10.85 km^{2})
  - Land: 4.152 sq mi (10.75 km^{2})
  - Water: 0.038 sq mi (0.098 km^{2})
- Elevation: 223 ft (68 m)

Population (2020)
  - Total: 312
  - Density: 75.1/sq mi (29.0/km^{2})
- Time zone: UTC-6 (Central (CST))
  - Summer (DST): UTC-5 (CDT)
- Area code: 850
- GNIS feature ID: 301643

Whitfield is an unincorporated community and census-designated place in Santa Rosa County, Florida, United States. Its population was 312 at the 2020 census, up from 295 in the 2010 census. It is part of the Pensacola—Ferry Pass—Brent, Florida Metropolitan Statistical Area. Florida State Road 87 passes through the community.

== Geography ==
According to the U.S. Census Bureau, the community has an area of 4.190 square miles (10.85 km^{2}); 4.152 square miles (10.75 km^{2}) of its area is land, and 0.038 square miles (0.098 km^{2}) is water.

== Demographics ==
Whitfield first appeared as a census designated place in the 2010 U.S. census.
