= Mount Carmel, Florida =

- Unincorporated community
- Location within Florida Location within the United States
- Coordinates: 30°59′14″N 87°07′35″W
- Country: United States
- State: Florida
- County: Santa Rosa

Area
  - Total: 5.301 sq mi (13.73 km^{2})
  - Land: 5.284 sq mi (13.69 km^{2})
  - Water: 0.017 sq mi (0.044 km^{2})
- Elevation: 171 ft (52 m)

Population (2020)
  - Total: 243
  - Density: 46.0/sq mi (17.8/km^{2})
- Time zone: UTC-6 (Central (CST))
  - Summer (DST): UTC-5 (CDT)
- ZIP code: 32565
- Area code: 850
- GNIS feature ID: 2583366

Mount Carmel is an unincorporated community and census-designated place in Santa Rosa County, Florida, United States. Its population was 243 at the 2020 census, up from 227 at the 2010 census. It is part of the Pensacola—Ferry Pass—Brent, Florida Metropolitan Statistical Area. Florida State Road 89 passes through the community.

== Geography ==
According to the U.S. Census Bureau, the community has an area of 5.301 square miles (13.73 km^{2}); 5.284 square miles (13.69 km^{2}) of its area is land, and 0.017 square miles (0.044 km^{2}) is water.

== Demographics ==
Mount Carmel first appeared as a census designated place in the 2010 U.S. census.
