= Point Baker, Florida =

- Unincorporated community
- Location within Florida Location within the United States
- Coordinates: 30°41′25″N 87°03′13″W
- Country: United States
- State: Florida
- County: Santa Rosa

Area
  - Total: 6.443 sq mi (16.69 km^{2})
  - Land: 6.419 sq mi (16.63 km^{2})
  - Water: 0.024 sq mi (0.062 km^{2})
- Elevation: 171 ft (52 m)

Population (2010)
  - Total: 2,991
  - Density: 466.0/sq mi (179.9/km^{2})
- Time zone: UTC-6 (Central (CST))
  - Summer (DST): UTC-5 (CDT)
- ZIP code: 32570
- Area code: 850
- GNIS feature ID: 289116

Point Baker is an unincorporated community and census-designated place in Santa Rosa County, Florida, United States. As of the 2020 census, Point Baker had a population of 3,443. Florida State Road 87 and Florida State Road 89 intersect in Point Baker.

== Geography ==
According to the U.S. Census Bureau, the community has an area of 6.443 square miles (16.69 km^{2}); 6.419 square miles (16.63 km^{2}) of its area is land, and 0.024 square miles (0.062 km^{2}) is water.

== Demographics ==
Point Baker first appeared as a census designated place in the 2010 U.S. census.

=== 2020 census ===
As of the 2020 census, Point Baker had a population of 3,443. The median age was 40.7 years. 22.3% of residents were under the age of 18 and 15.2% of residents were 65 years of age or older. For every 100 females there were 93.5 males, and for every 100 females age 18 and over there were 89.8 males age 18 and over.

68.6% of residents lived in urban areas, while 31.4% lived in rural areas.

There were 1,360 households in Point Baker, of which 29.6% had children under the age of 18 living in them. Of all households, 47.5% were married-couple households, 17.4% were households with a male householder and no spouse or partner present, and 26.9% were households with a female householder and no spouse or partner present. About 23.4% of all households were made up of individuals and 9.7% had someone living alone who was 65 years of age or older.

There were 1,468 housing units, of which 7.4% were vacant. The homeowner vacancy rate was 1.3% and the rental vacancy rate was 8.8%.

Racial composition as of the 2020 census
Race	Number	Percent
White	2,789	81.0%
Black or African American	228	6.6%
American Indian and Alaska Native	32	0.9%
Asian	42	1.2%
Native Hawaiian and Other Pacific Islander	6	0.2%
Some other race	58	1.7%
Two or more races	288	8.4%
Hispanic or Latino (of any race)	170	4.9%
