= List of county roads in Santa Rosa County, Florida =

- County road shields used in Florida

Highway names
- Interstates: Interstate X (I-X)
- US Highways: U.S. Highway X (US X)
- State: State Road X (SR X)
- County: County Road X (CR-X)

System links
- County roads in Florida; County roads in Santa Rosa County

The following is a list of county roads in Santa Rosa County, Florida. All county roads are maintained by the county in which they reside.

== County roads in Santa Rosa County, Florida ==
Route	Road Name(s)	From	To	Notes
CR 30A	Fairpoint Drive; Shoreline Drive; Daniel Street	US 98 (SR 30)	US 98 (SR 30)	former SR 30A
CR 87A	Alabama Street; North Avenue	US 90/SR 87 & CR 191 (South)	SR 87	former SR 87A
CR 87A	Langley Street; East Gate Road	SR 87	CR 191	former SR 87A; Runs through Whiting Field, and is bisected by it
CR 87A	Market Road	SR 4	SR 87	former SR 87A
CR 89	Ward Basin Road	Yellow River in Pine Bluff	US 90	former SR 89
CR 164	Harvest Road; Greenwood Road	CR 197	SR 4	former SR 164; Brief gap at SR 89
CR 178	Spanish Trail	CR 197	SR 87	former SR 178
CR 182	Central School Road; Allentown School Road	Escambia River WMA	SR 87	former SR 182
CR 184	Quinnette Road	Escambia-Santa Rosa County Line	CRs 197 & 197A	former SR 184
CR 184	Hickory Hammock Road; Nichols Lake Road	CR 89	East of Nichols Creek Road	former SR 184
CR 184A	Berryhill Road	CR 197	SR 89	former SR 184A
CR 191	Garcon Point Road; Forsyth Street; Henry Street	SR 281	US 90/SR 87	former SR 191
CR 191	Willard Norris Road/Magnolia Street	CR 197	SR 87	former SR 191
CR 191	Munson Highway	SR 87	Florida-Alabama State Line	former SR 191
CR 191	Willing Street; Broad Street	US 90/SR 87	CR 191 (Munson Highway)	former SR 191
CR 191A	Bay Street; Oriole Beach Road	Dead End west of Coronado Drive	US 98	former SR 191
CR 191A	Old Bagdad Highway	SR 281 @ US 90	CR 191	former SR 191A
CR 191A		Pace	Mulat	former SR 191A
CR 191B	Soundside Drive	US 98	Dead End east of Land's End Road	former SR 191
CR 191B	Sterling Way	Escambia Bay	CRs 281 & 281B	former SR 191B
CR 191C	Nantahala Beach Road	CR 191B	US 98	
CR 191C	Robinson Point Road	CR 191	CR 191	former SR 191C
CR 191D		Woodlawn Beach Boat Ramp	US 98	
CR 191E	Honey Lake Road	US 90	US 221	
CR 197	Chumuckla Highway; North Alabama Street	Bass Hole Cove, on Escambia Bay	SR 87	former SR 197; Gap between Chumuckla Highway and SR 4
CR 197A	Spring Street; Commerce Street; First Street West	CR 197	SR 87	former SR 197
CR 197A	Woodbine Lane; Bell Lane	US 90	CR 191B	former SR 197A
CR 197A		US 90	CR 184 / CR 197	former SR 197A
CR 197B	Norris Road; West Spencer Field Road	CR 197	US 90	former SR 197B
CR 281	Del Monte Street; Montecito Boulevard; Mullat Road	SR 281	SR 281	former SR 281
CR 281B	American Cyanamid Road	CRs 191B & 281	SR 281	former SR 281B
CR 399	Country Mill Road; Highway 4 Tractor Trail	SR 87	SR 89	former SR 399; Brief gap at SR 4
CR 399	College Parkway; Quiet Water lane	US 98	Dead End at a canal near Redfish Point	former SR 399
CR 399	East Bay Boulevard	US 98	SR 87	former SR 399
