= Berrydale, Florida =

- Unincorporated community
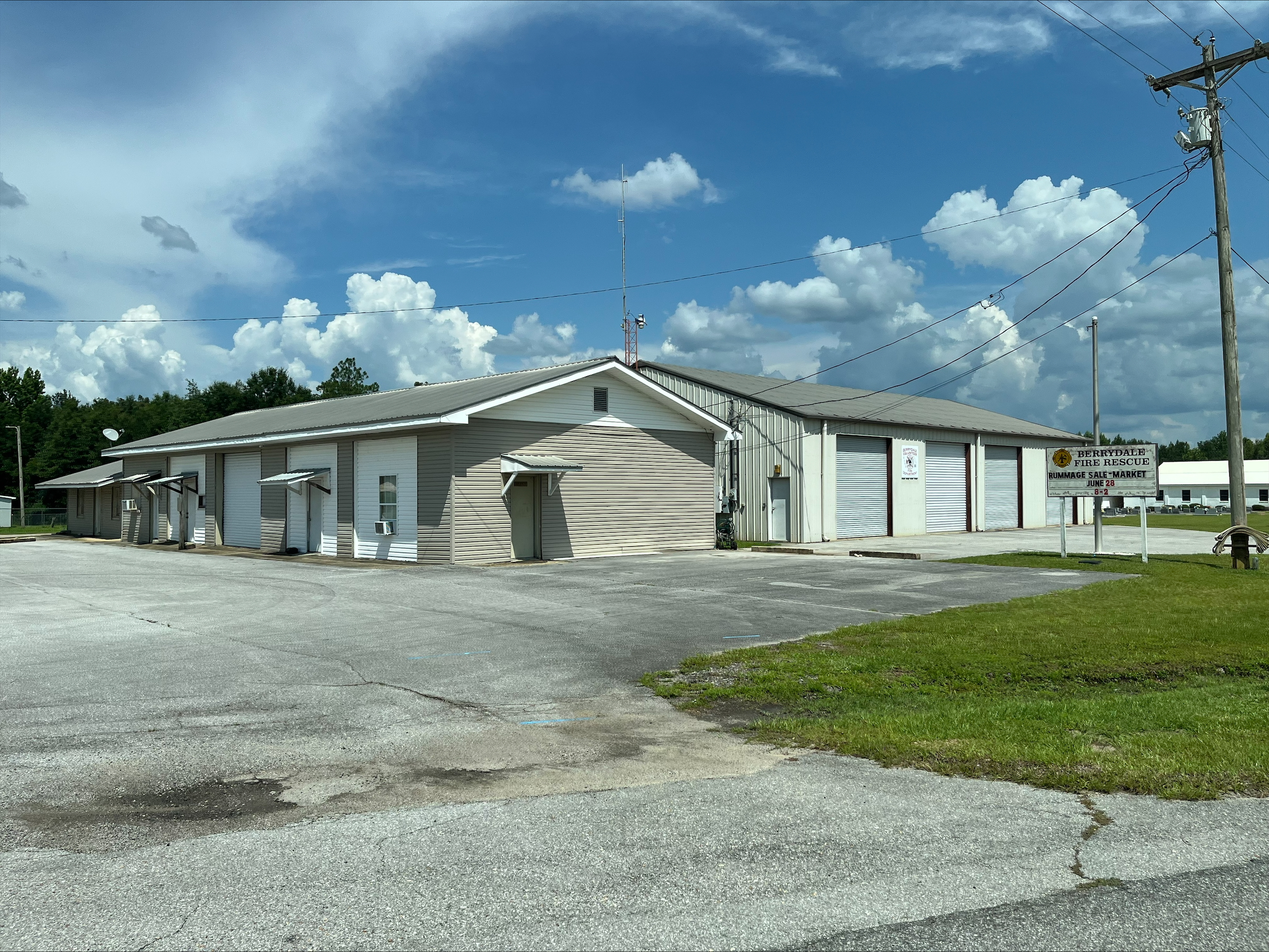
- Berrydale Fire Rescue

- Location within Florida Location within the United States
- Coordinates: 30°52′58″N 87°01′45″W
- Country: United States
- State: Florida
- County: Santa Rosa

Area
  - Total: 8.650 sq mi (22.40 km^{2})
  - Land: 8.629 sq mi (22.35 km^{2})
  - Water: 0.021 sq mi (0.054 km^{2})
- Elevation: 233 ft (71 m)

Population (2020)
  - Total: 348
  - Density: 40.3/sq mi (15.6/km^{2})
- Time zone: UTC-6 (Central (CST))
  - Summer (DST): UTC-5 (CDT)
- Area code: 850
- GNIS feature ID: 2583329

Berrydale is an unincorporated community and census-designated place in Santa Rosa County, Florida, United States. Its population was 348 at the 2020 census, down from 441 at the 2010 census. It is part of the Pensacola—Ferry Pass—Brent, Florida Metropolitan Statistical Area. Florida State Road 4 passes through the community.

== Geography ==
According to the U.S. Census Bureau, the community has an area of 8.650 square miles (22.40 km^{2}); 8.629 square miles (22.35 km^{2}) of its area is land, and 0.021 square miles (0.054 km^{2}) is water.

== Demographics ==
Historical population
Census	Pop.	Note	%±
2010	441		—
2020	348		−21.1%
U.S. Decennial Census

Berrydale first appeared as a census designated place in the 2010 U.S. census.

=== Racial and ethnic composition ===
Berrydale CDP, Florida – Racial and ethnic composition Note: the US Census treats Hispanic/Latino as an ethnic category. This table excludes Latinos from the racial categories and assigns them to a separate category. Hispanics/Latinos may be of any race.
Race / Ethnicity (NH = Non-Hispanic)	Pop 2010	Pop 2020	% 2010	% 2020
White alone (NH)	354	313	80.27%	89.94%
Black or African American alone (NH)	66	0	14.97%	0.00%
Native American or Alaska Native alone (NH)	5	8	1.13%	2.30%
Asian alone (NH)	0	0	0.00%	0.00%
Native Hawaiian or Pacific Islander alone (NH)	0	0	0.00%	0.00%
Other race alone (NH)	0	0	0.00%	0.00%
Mixed race or Multiracial (NH)	6	19	1.36%	5.46%
Hispanic or Latino (any race)	10	8	2.27%	2.30%
Total	441	348	100.00%	100.00%
