= Munson, Florida =

- Unincorporated community
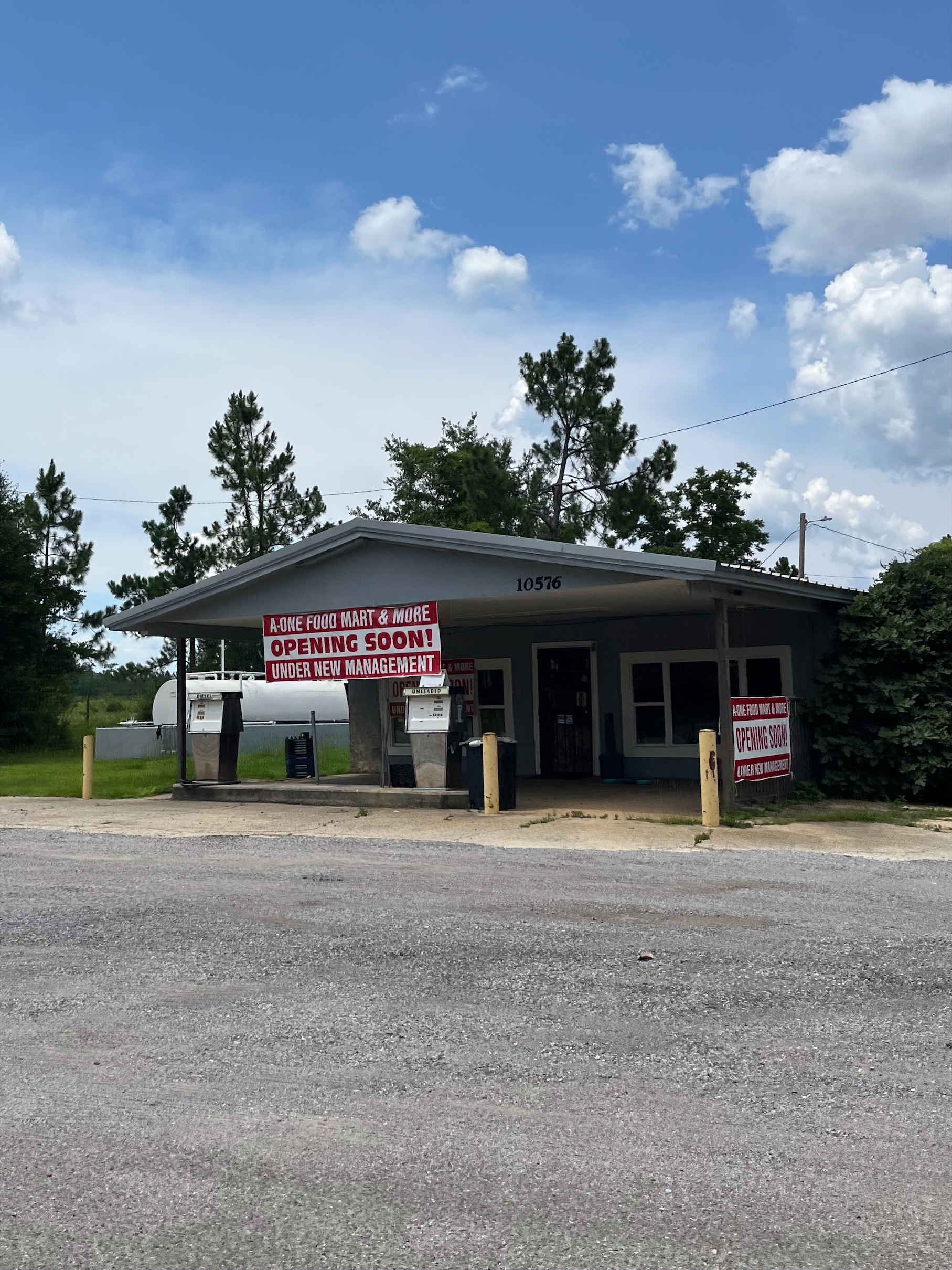
- Store in Munson

- Location within Florida Location within the United States
- Coordinates: 30°52′15″N 86°51′43″W
- Country: United States
- State: Florida
- County: Santa Rosa

Area
  - Total: 25.355 sq mi (65.67 km^{2})
  - Land: 25.264 sq mi (65.43 km^{2})
  - Water: 0.091 sq mi (0.24 km^{2})
- Elevation: 125 ft (38 m)

Population (2020)
  - Total: 326
  - Density: 12.9/sq mi (4.98/km^{2})
- Time zone: UTC-6 (Central (CST))
  - Summer (DST): UTC-5 (CDT)
- Area code: 850
- GNIS feature ID: 2583367

Munson is an unincorporated community and census-designated place in Santa Rosa County, Florida, United States. Its population was 326 at the 2020 census, down from 372 as of the 2010 census. It is part of the Pensacola—Ferry Pass—Brent, Florida Metropolitan Statistical Area. Florida State Road 4 passes through the community.

== Geography ==
According to the U.S. Census Bureau, the community has an area of 25.355 square miles (65.67 km^{2}); 25.264 square miles (65.43 km^{2}) of its area is land, and 0.091 square miles (0.24 km^{2}) is water.

== Demographics ==
Munson first appeared as a census designated place in the 2010 U.S. census.
