= East Milton, Florida =

- Unincorporated community
- Location within Florida Location within the United States
- Coordinates: 30°36′55″N 87°01′18″W
- Country: United States
- State: Florida
- County: Santa Rosa

Area
  - Total: 30.157 sq mi (78.11 km^{2})
  - Land: 28.811 sq mi (74.62 km^{2})
  - Water: 1.346 sq mi (3.49 km^{2})
- Elevation: 13 ft (4.0 m)

Population (2020)
  - Total: 14,309
  - Density: 496.65/sq mi (191.76/km^{2})
- Time zone: UTC-6 (Central (CST))
  - Summer (DST): UTC-5 (CDT)
- Area code: 850
- GNIS feature ID: 282001

East Milton is an unincorporated community in Santa Rosa County, Florida. It is part of the Pensacola Metropolitan Statistical Area. The community is located on the east bank of the Blackwater River opposite of Milton, and is located approximately 25 miles northeast of Pensacola. The population was 14,309 at the 2020 census, up from 11,074 at the 2010 census.

== Geography ==
According to the U.S. Census Bureau, the community has an area of 30.157 square miles (78.11 km^{2}); 28.811 square miles (74.62 km^{2}) of its area is land, and 1.346 square miles (3.49 km^{2}) is water.

== Demographics ==
East Milton first appeared as a census designated place in the 2010 U.S. census.

=== 2020 census ===
As of the 2020 census, East Milton had a population of 14,309. The median age was 39.0 years. 13.2% of residents were under the age of 18 and 12.8% of residents were 65 years of age or older. For every 100 females there were 227.8 males, and for every 100 females age 18 and over there were 261.7 males age 18 and over.

46.4% of residents lived in urban areas, while 53.6% lived in rural areas.

There were 3,398 households in East Milton, of which 25.8% had children under the age of 18 living in them. Of all households, 49.6% were married-couple households, 19.7% were households with a male householder and no spouse or partner present, and 23.3% were households with a female householder and no spouse or partner present. About 25.4% of all households were made up of individuals and 10.7% had someone living alone who was 65 years of age or older.

There were 3,772 housing units, of which 9.9% were vacant. The homeowner vacancy rate was 1.4% and the rental vacancy rate was 6.5%.

Racial composition as of the 2020 census
Race	Number	Percent
White	9,676	67.6%
Black or African American	3,228	22.6%
American Indian and Alaska Native	97	0.7%
Asian	81	0.6%
Native Hawaiian and Other Pacific Islander	21	0.1%
Some other race	450	3.1%
Two or more races	756	5.3%
Hispanic or Latino (of any race)	1,128	7.9%
