= Santa Rosa County, Florida =

County in Florida, United States

- County
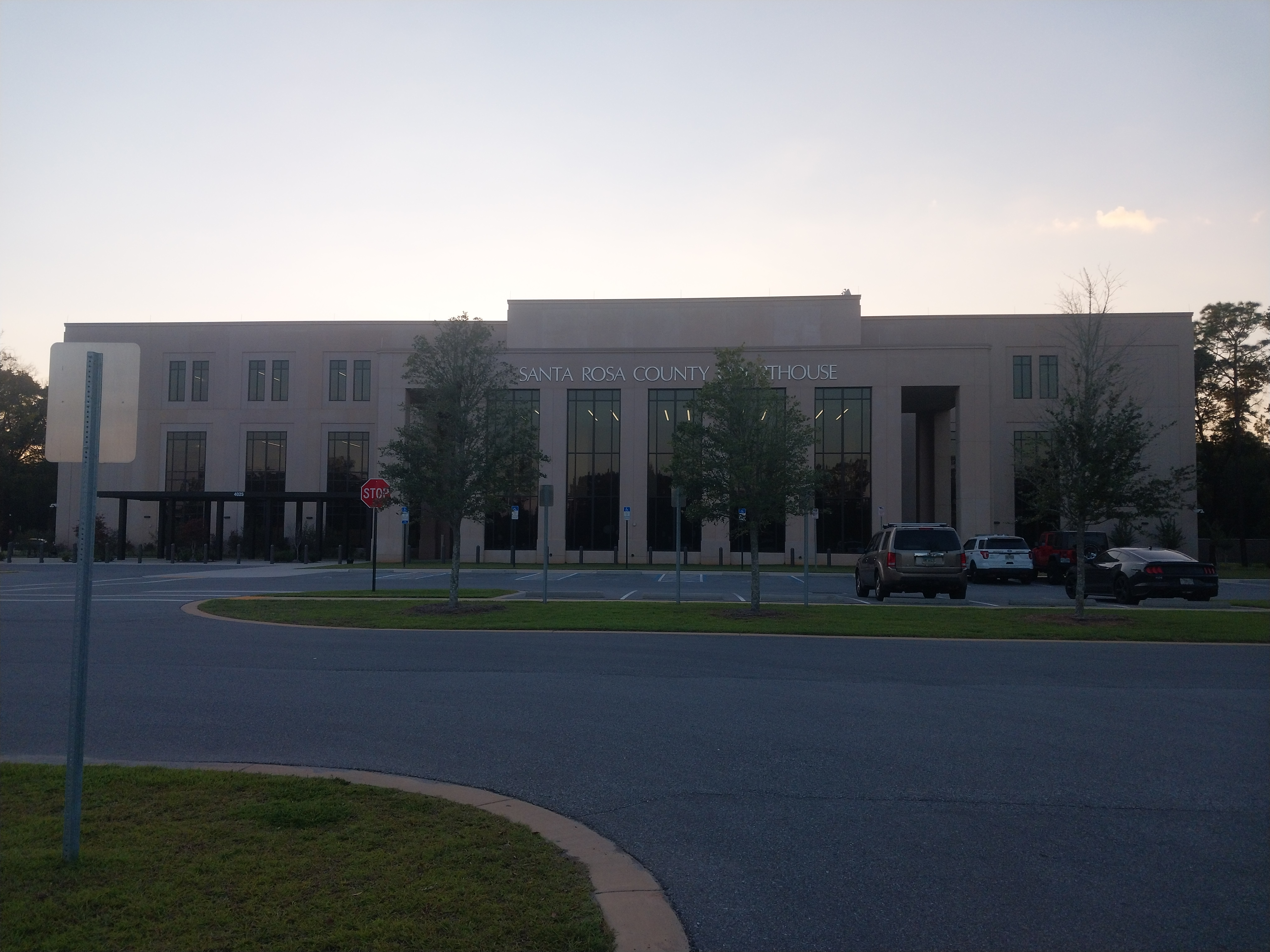
- Santa Rosa County Courthouse

- Seal

- Location within the U.S. state of Florida
- Coordinates: 30°42′N 87°01′W
- Country: United States
- State: Florida
- Founded: February 18, 1842
- Named for: Saint Rose of Viterbo
- Seat: Milton
- Largest community: Navarre

Area
  - Total: 1,174 sq mi (3,040 km^{2})
  - Land: 1,012 sq mi (2,620 km^{2})
  - Water: 162 sq mi (420 km^{2}) 13.8%

Population (2020)
  - Total: 188,000
  - Estimate (2025): 211,115 ▲
  - Density: 186/sq mi (71.7/km^{2})
- Time zone: UTC−6 (Central)
  - Summer (DST): UTC−5 (CDT)
- Congressional district: 1st
- Website: www.santarosa.fl.gov

Santa Rosa County is a county in the northwestern portion of the U.S. state of Florida. As of 2020, its population was 188,000. The county seat is Milton, which lies in the geographic center of the county. Other major communities within Santa Rosa County are Navarre, Pace, and Gulf Breeze. Navarre is the most populated community, with a population of approximately 45,000 residents. Santa Rosa County is included in the Pensacola metropolitan area, which also includes Escambia County.

== History ==
The first European in Santa Rosa County may have been Diego Maldonado, a member of Tristan de Luna's failed expedition. Natives dominated the area until the late 1700s. A Spanish mission serving Apalachees, Nuestra Señora de la Soledad y San Luís, may have been located in Floridatown from 1718 until 1740.

Santa Rosa County was created in 1842, when it was divided from Escambia County. It was named after the barrier island along its southern coast, which, in turn, had been named for the Roman Catholic saint Rosa de Viterbo.

Santa Rosa County repealed its prohibition on alcohol in 2005.

Santa Rosa County has seen unprecedented growth in population, specifically in Navarre, Pace, and Gulf Breeze. The county is a quickly growing tourist destination because of its access to beaches and protected wilderness areas for kayaking, hiking, and camping.

== Geography ==
According to the U.S. Census Bureau, the county has a total area of 1,174 square miles (3,040 km^{2}), of which 162 sq mi (420 km^{2}) (13.8%) are covered by water.

=== National protected area ===
- Choctawhatchee National Forest (part)

=== Regions ===
Santa Rosa County can be divided into three distinct sections: South Santa Rosa, Central Santa Rosa, and North Santa Rosa. The sections are centered on the main east–west roads that pass through the county.

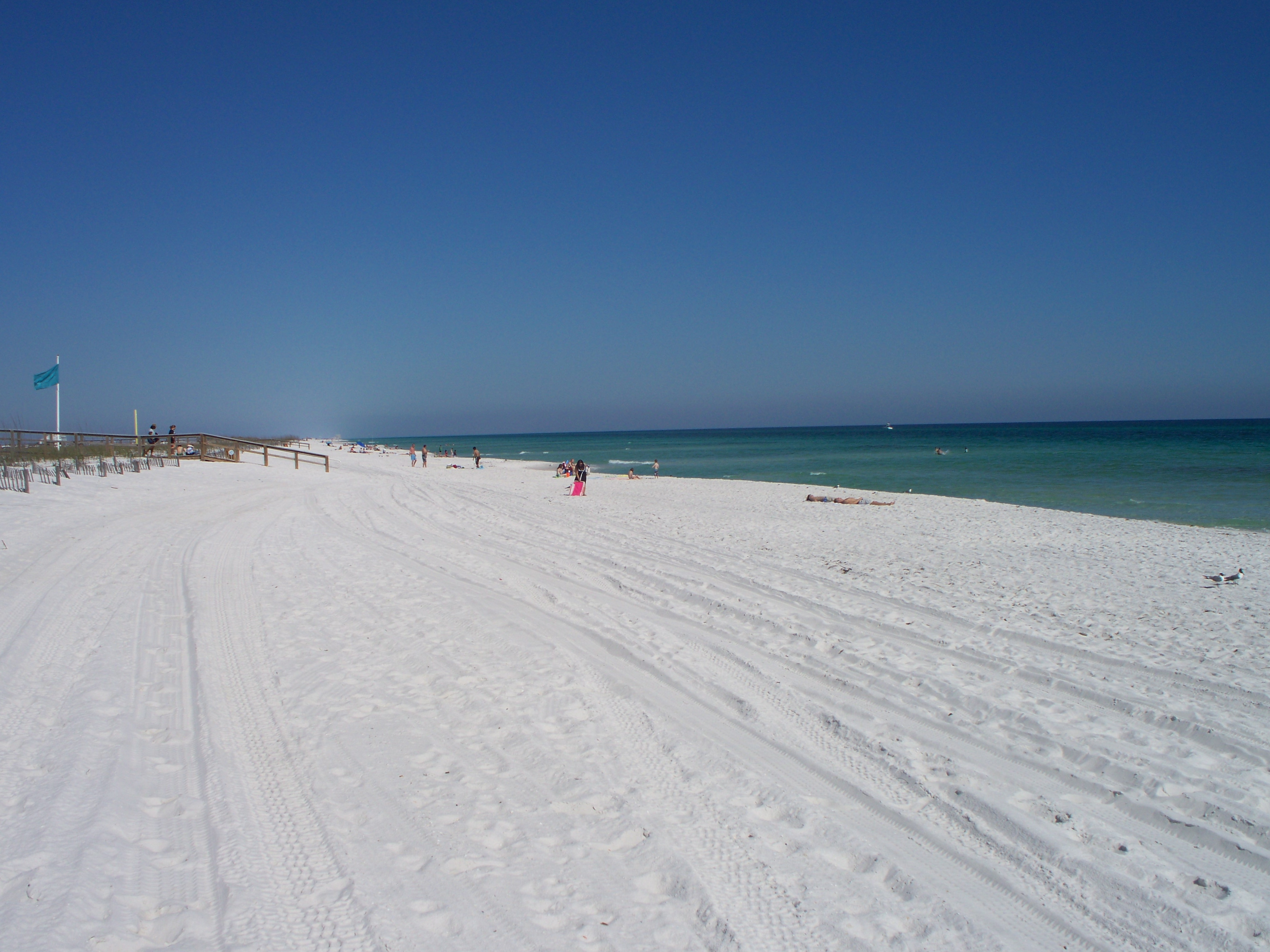
Navarre Beach

South Santa Rosa County comprises the area from Holley and Navarre in the east to Gulf Breeze]at the western end of the Fairpoint Peninsula, and along U.S. Highway 98. A section of Santa Rosa Island, containing the unincorporated community of Navarre Beach, is also part of South Santa Rosa County. Major bodies of water including Santa Rosa Sound, Pensacola Bay, and East Bay strongly influence the housing and lifestyle of citizens in the southern part of the county. This fast-growing region serves primarily as "bedroom communities" for Pensacola to the west and Hurlburt Field, Fort Walton Beach, and Eglin Air Force Base to the east.

Central Santa Rosa County is the area north of the bays and south of the extensive forests separating it from North Santa Rosa. The central section developed along the so-called Old Spanish Trail that ran from St. Augustine to New Orleans, and further points west. Today, U.S. Highway 90 closely parallels the old trail, and is the main highway that connects the region. Despite recent growth, the Central Region is best identified by its rural roots, and can be best characterized by traditional Southern culture. The Pace and Milton communities compose the Central Region, with both having populations roughly around 30,000. The county seat, Milton is located where the trail crossed the Blackwater River. To the west of Milton bordering the Escambia River, Pace has experienced exponential growth, both residential and commercial. Interstate 10 also passes through this section of the county. The U.S. Navy presence is marked by Whiting Field and NOLF Spencer Field.

Northern Santa Rosa County is forest and farming country. The only town in the north is Jay. Most development has been along State Road 4, which runs through the northern sections of Escambia, Santa Rosa, and Okaloosa Counties. A large oil and natural gas field around Jay produced a great deal of oil, and made many farmers millionaires in the 1970s and 1980s, but the field has been depleted and is producing little oil today. The citizens have, for the most part, returned to farming and forestry for their livelihoods.

State Road 87 traverses the county from north to south, between U.S. Highway 98 and the border with Escambia County, Alabama, near Brewton, where it connects with State Route 41. This road is a primary emergency evacuation route for the county during hurricanes.

=== Adjacent counties ===
- Escambia County, Alabama - north
- Okaloosa County, Florida - east
- Escambia County, Florida - west

== Government ==
=== Board of county commissioners ===
The Santa Rosa County Board of County Commissioners serves as the legislative and policy-setting body of the county as established under Chapter 125 of the Florida Statutes. As such, the board enacts all legislation and authorizes programs and expenditures within the county. The board appoints a professionally trained county administrator, who is responsible for policy and budget development and implementation.

The board comprises five members, elected countywide. Members must reside within the particular districts for which they seek election. Each year, the board organizes itself, selecting a chair and vice chair from among its members to preside at commission meetings.

Current Santa Rosa County commissioners
District	Commissioner
1 (Pace/Central to western region)	Bobby Burkett
2 (Milton/central to northeastern region)	Kerry Smith
3 (Jay/central to northwestern region)	Rhett Rowell
4 (Navarre/southeastern region)	Ray Eddington
5 (Gulf Breeze/southwestern region)	Colton Wright

The commission meets in regular session beginning at 9:00 am the second and fourth Thursday of the month in the Commissioner's Board Room in the Administrative Center, 6495 Caroline Street, in Milton. Called meetings and workshops are scheduled periodically and are advertised and open to the public.

=== County officials ===
Office	Officeholder
Supervisor of elections	Tappie A Villane
Property appraiser	Greg Brown II
Sheriff	Bob Johnson
Tax collector	Stan Colie Nichols
Clerk of courts	Jason English

== Demographics ==
Historical population
Census	Pop.	Note	%±
1850	2,883		—
1860	5,480		90.1%
1870	3,312		−39.6%
1880	6,645		100.6%
1890	7,961		19.8%
1900	10,293		29.3%
1910	14,897		44.7%
1920	13,670		−8.2%
1930	14,083		3.0%
1940	16,085		14.2%
1950	18,554		15.3%
1960	29,547		59.2%
1970	37,741		27.7%
1980	55,988		48.3%
1990	81,608		45.8%
2000	117,743		44.3%
2010	151,372		28.6%
2020	188,000		24.2%
2025 (est.)	211,115	▲	12.3%
U.S. Decennial Census; 1790-1960 1900-1990; 1990-2000 2010-2019

=== Racial and ethnic composition ===
Santa Rosa County, Florida – Racial and ethnic composition Note: the US Census treats Hispanic/Latino as an ethnic category. This table excludes Latinos from the racial categories and assigns them to a separate category. Hispanics/Latinos may be of any race.
Race / Ethnicity (NH = Non-Hispanic)	Pop 1980	Pop 1990	Pop 2000	Pop 2010	Pop 2020	% 1980	% 1990	% 2000	% 2010	% 2020
White alone (NH)	51,963	75,519	104,919	128,726	147,518	92.81%	92.54%	89.11%	85.04%	78.47%
Black or African American alone (NH)	2,479	3,231	4,899	7,940	10,690	4.43%	3.96%	4.16%	5.25%	5.69%
Native American or Alaska Native alone (NH)	276	702	1,125	1,194	1,112	0.49%	0.86%	0.96%	0.79%	0.59%
Asian alone (NH)	518	909	1,498	2,690	3,818	0.93%	1.11%	1.27%	1.78%	2.03%
Native Hawaiian or Pacific Islander alone (NH)	x	x	85	200	362	x	x	0.07%	0.13%	0.19%
Other race alone (NH)	0	24	171	218	847	0.00%	0.03%	0.15%	0.14%	0.45%
Mixed race or Multiracial (NH)	x	x	2,078	3,897	11,763	x	x	1.76%	2.57%	6.26%
Hispanic or Latino (any race)	752	1,223	2,968	6,507	11,890	1.34%	1.50%	2.52%	4.30%	6.32%
Total	55,988	81,608	117,743	151,372	188,000	100.00%	100.00%	100.00%	100.00%	100.00%

=== 2020 census ===
As of the 2020 census, 188,000 people, 69,454 households, and 47,876 families resided in the county.

The median age was 40.3 years; 22.8% of residents were under the age of 18 and 16.7% of residents were 65 years of age or older. For every 100 females there were 103.1 males, and for every 100 females age 18 and over there were 102.1 males age 18 and over.

The racial makeup of the county was 80.4% White, 5.9% Black or African American, 0.7% American Indian and Alaska Native, 2.1% Asian, 0.2% Native Hawaiian and Pacific Islander, 1.9% from some other race, and 8.8% from two or more races. Hispanic or Latino residents of any race comprised 6.3% of the population.

80.1% of residents lived in urban areas, while 19.9% lived in rural areas.

Of the 69,454 households, 32.8% had children under the age of 18 living in them; 56.6% were married-couple households, 15.2% were households with a male householder and no spouse or partner present, and 22.1% were households with a female householder and no spouse or partner present. About 21.5% of all households were made up of individuals and 9.6% had someone living alone who was 65 years of age or older.

There were 75,854 housing units, of which 8.4% were vacant. Among occupied housing units, 77.3% were owner-occupied and 22.7% were renter-occupied. The homeowner vacancy rate was 1.4% and the rental vacancy rate was 8.5%.

=== 2000 census ===
As of the 2000 census, 117,743 people, 43,793 households, and 33,326 families resided in the county. The population density was 116 inhabitants per square mile (45/km^{2}). The 49,119 housing units had an average density of 48 per square mile (19/km^{2}). The racial makeup of the county was 90.72% White, 4.25% African American, 1.01% Native American, 1.30% Asian, 0.08% Pacific Islander, 0.67% from other races, and 1.98% from two or more races. About 2.52% of the population were Hispanics or Latinos of any race.

Of the 43,793 households, 36.5% had children under 18 living with them, 62.2% were married couples living together, 10.2% had a female householder with no husband present, and 23.9% were not families. About 19.3% of all households were made up of individuals, and 6.6% had someone living alone who was 65 or older. The average household size was 2.63 and the average family size was 3.00.

In the county, the age distribution was 26.6% under 18, 7.2% from 18 to 24, 31.1% from 25 to 44, 24.1% from 45 to 64, and 11.0% who were 65 or older. The median age was 37 years. For every 100 females, there were 100.6 males. For every 100 females 18 and over, there were 97.9 males.

The median income for a household in the county was $41,881 and for a family was $46,929. Males had a median income of $34,878 versus $22,304 for females. The per capita income for the county was $20,089. About 7.9% of families and 9.8% of the population were below the poverty line, including 12.6% of those under 18 and 7.5% of those 65 or over.

== Libraries ==
The Santa Rosa County Library System has five branches located in: Navarre, Gulf Breeze, Jay, Milton, and Pace.

== Communities ==
The largest communities are Navarre and Pace.

=== Cities ===
- Gulf Breeze
- Milton

=== Town ===
- Jay

=== Census-designated places ===
- Allentown
- Avalon
- Bagdad
- Berrydale
- Brownsdale
- Chumuckla
- Cobbtown
- Dickerson City
- Dixonville
- East Milton
- Fidelis
- Floridatown
- Garcon Point
- Harold
- Holley
- Midway
- Mount Carmel
- Mulat
- Munson
- Navarre
- Navarre Beach
- Oriole Beach
- Pace
- Pea Ridge
- Pine Level
- Point Baker
- Roeville
- Springhill
- Tiger Point
- Wallace
- Whitfield
- Woodlawn Beach

=== Ghost towns ===
- Belandville
- Coon Hill
- Floridale

== Politics ==
Santa Rosa County is a stronghold of the Republican Party. It has supported the Republican candidate in each presidential election since 1972, consistently by overwhelming margins.

United States presidential election results for Santa Rosa County, Florida
Year	Republican		Democratic		Third party(ies)	
Year	No.	%	No.	%	No.	%
1892	0	0.00%	452	83.86%	87	16.14%
1896	431	36.68%	694	59.06%	50	4.26%
1900	38	6.47%	519	88.42%	30	5.11%
1904	73	13.30%	403	73.41%	73	13.30%
1908	212	26.40%	535	66.63%	56	6.97%
1912	70	7.84%	592	66.29%	231	25.87%
1916	111	10.23%	896	82.58%	78	7.19%
1920	333	28.88%	813	70.51%	7	0.61%
1924	229	23.34%	693	70.64%	59	6.01%
1928	1,628	73.97%	541	24.58%	32	1.45%
1932	315	10.09%	2,806	89.91%	0	0.00%
1936	744	20.23%	2,934	79.77%	0	0.00%
1940	656	18.40%	2,910	81.60%	0	0.00%
1944	862	24.85%	2,607	75.15%	0	0.00%
1948	549	15.58%	2,316	65.72%	659	18.70%
1952	1,744	28.50%	4,375	71.50%	0	0.00%
1956	1,909	31.54%	4,144	68.46%	0	0.00%
1960	2,777	35.89%	4,960	64.11%	0	0.00%
1964	5,983	62.63%	3,570	37.37%	0	0.00%
1968	2,567	20.19%	1,600	12.58%	8,549	67.23%
1972	12,669	88.94%	1,491	10.47%	85	0.60%
1976	9,122	52.39%	8,020	46.06%	270	1.55%
1980	13,802	63.93%	6,964	32.26%	824	3.82%
1984	21,265	82.04%	4,649	17.94%	6	0.02%
1988	18,973	77.85%	5,254	21.56%	143	0.59%
1992	17,339	52.90%	6,556	20.00%	8,882	27.10%
1996	26,301	62.02%	10,936	25.79%	5,173	12.20%
2000	36,339	72.10%	12,818	25.43%	1,245	2.47%
2004	52,059	77.35%	14,659	21.78%	589	0.88%
2008	55,972	73.28%	19,470	25.49%	935	1.22%
2012	58,186	75.51%	17,768	23.06%	1,106	1.44%
2016	65,339	73.68%	18,464	20.82%	4,881	5.50%
2020	77,385	72.19%	27,612	25.76%	2,201	2.05%
2024	84,314	74.67%	27,035	23.94%	1,561	1.38%

== Transportation ==
=== Airports ===
- Fort Walton Beach Airport
- Peter Prince Field

=== Highways ===
- I-10
- US 90
- US 98
- SR 4
- SR 87
- SR 89
- SR 281
- SR 399

== See also ==
- Santa Rosa County District Schools
- National Register of Historic Places listings in Santa Rosa County, Florida
