= Milton, Florida =

- City
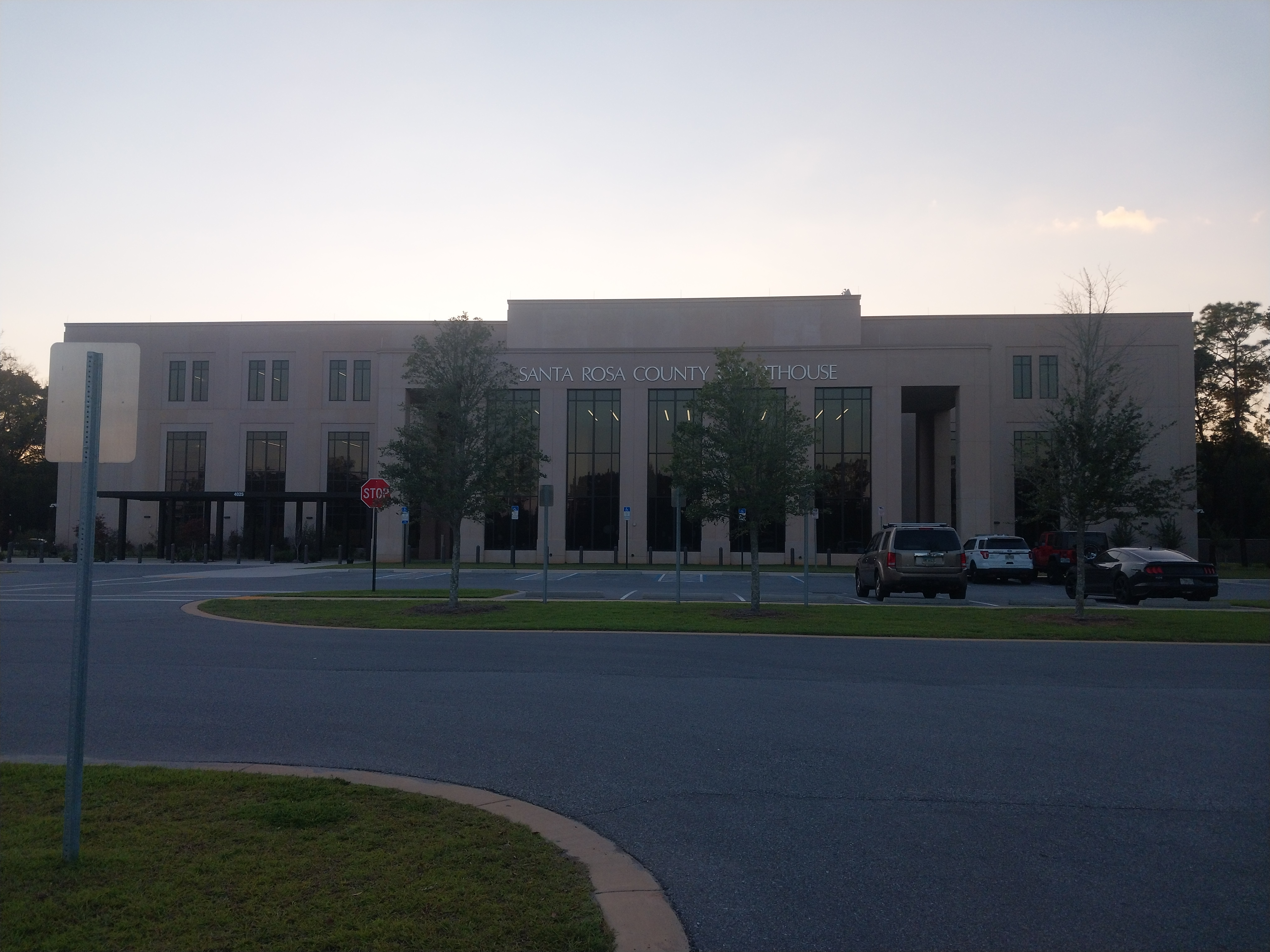
- Santa Rosa County Courthouse

- Seal

- Location of Milton, Florida
- Coordinates: 30°37′32″N 87°03′14″W
- Country: United States
- State: Florida
- County: Santa Rosa
- Incorporated: 1844

Government
  - Type: Council–Manager

Area
  - Total: 5.960 sq mi (15.436 km^{2})
  - Land: 5.732 sq mi (14.845 km^{2})
  - Water: 0.229 sq mi (0.592 km^{2}) 4.59%
- Elevation: 62 ft (19 m)

Population (2020)
  - Total: 10,197
  - Estimate (2023): 10,957
  - Density: 1,945.9/sq mi (751.31/km^{2})
- Time zone: UTC−6 (Central (CST))
  - Summer (DST): UTC−5 (CDT)
- ZIP Codes: 32570, 32571, 32572, 32583
- Area codes: 850 and 448
- FIPS code: 12-45750
- GNIS feature ID: 2404270
- Website: www.miltonfl.org

Milton is a city in and the county seat of Santa Rosa County, Florida, United States. It is located within the Pensacola metropolitan area. The city was first Incorporated in 1844, however certain areas such as East Milton, Point Baker, and Bagdad remain unincorporated. Milton is located in the geographic center of Santa Rosa County, and it is bordered by Pace to the west, and Navarre to the south. The population was 10,197 at the 2020 census.

== Etymology ==
Milton was known by various names during its development. Most notable were "Hell-Town" (muggy, inhospitable land covered with briars, mosquitoes, thorns, snakes), "Jernigan's Landing", "Scratch Ankle" (due to the briars that grew along the riverbank), and "Hard Scrabble".

According to Florida historian Allen Morris, "Just which Milton was honored by the final name is a dispute. Some say it is a contraction of an earlier Milltown; others that it was Milton Amos, pioneer and ancestor of the present Amos family; still others that it was John Milton—not the English poet, but the Civil War governor of Florida."

== History ==
Milton was settled in the early 1800s as a small village centered on the lumber industry. The settlement originally was known as Scratch Ankle because of the briars and bramble that grew in the area. Another name was Jernigan's Landing after Benjamin Jernigan (died April 1847), who built a water-powered saw mill at what is now Locklin Lake between 1828 and 1830. Other names were Lumberton, Black Water, and Hard Scrabble, but by 1839, it was being referred to as Milltown. Milton was incorporated as a town in 1844, one year before the Territory of Florida joined the United States as the 27th state.

During the Civil War, much of Milton was burned by Confederate forces retreating from the Union capture of Pensacola on May 2–4, 1862. The Confederates intended to prevent the town's industries from falling into Union hands. After the Southern forces evacuated, the Union troops had a small garrison in nearby Bagdad, where they had a base for expeditions in the surrounding area. Many Milton residents fled to Alabama.

In the early days of Milton, it was known as an extremely rough town. Judges from Escambia County sentenced criminals to be confined to Milton, which was nicknamed "Hell Town" by its residents. An old story from the area tells of the Rough Riders passing through Milton on their "best behavior".

Naval Air Station Whiting Field was constructed during World War II with the help of many German prisoners of war who were housed in a camp on the site. The station was commissioned on July 16, 1943, by Rear Admiral George D. Murray and the widow of Captain Kenneth Whiting, after whom the station was named.

The first hospital care in Milton began in 1951, when a group of locals formed the Santa Rosa County Hospital Board. The first hospital in Milton, Santa Rosa Hospital, was located on Stewart Street and opened on December 2, 1952. Santa Rosa Hospital had multiple expansions in the 1960s, and by 1970, the hospital was far too small for Milton's growing population. Construction for a new hospital began that year, and in December 1972, the Santa Rosa Medical Center was opened.

On March 31, 1962, an F3 tornado hit the northwest side of Milton, causing 17 deaths and 100 injuries. It was the deadliest tornado in 1962, as well as was Florida's deadliest tornado until February 22, 1998, when 25 people were killed in Kissimmee by another F3 tornado.

On January 21, 2025, Milton received 10 inches (25 cm) of snow during the Gulf Coast blizzard, more than double the previous state record of 4 inches (10 cm) that was also set in Milton in 1954.

== Geography ==
Milton is located near the mouth of the Blackwater River.

According to the United States Census Bureau, the city has a total area of 5.960 square miles (15.44 km^{2}), of which, 5.732 square miles (14.85 km^{2}) is land and 0.228 square miles (0.59 km^{2}) (4.59%) is water.

=== Climate ===
Climate data for Milton, Florida (Milton Experimental Station), 1991–2020 normals, extremes 1948–2008
Month	Jan	Feb	Mar	Apr	May	Jun	Jul	Aug	Sep	Oct	Nov	Dec	Year
Record high °F (°C)	84 (29)	84 (29)	88 (31)	94 (34)	99 (37)	103 (39)	104 (40)	102 (39)	102 (39)	98 (37)	88 (31)	82 (28)	104 (40)
Mean maximum °F (°C)	75.2 (24.0)	77.6 (25.3)	83.6 (28.7)	87.3 (30.7)	92.5 (33.6)	96.6 (35.9)	97.9 (36.6)	96.8 (36.0)	95.0 (35.0)	89.7 (32.1)	83.5 (28.6)	78.0 (25.6)	99.1 (37.3)
Mean daily maximum °F (°C)	59.9 (15.5)	64.4 (18.0)	71.2 (21.8)	77.0 (25.0)	84.9 (29.4)	89.8 (32.1)	91.0 (32.8)	90.8 (32.7)	87.4 (30.8)	79.6 (26.4)	69.8 (21.0)	62.7 (17.1)	77.4 (25.2)
Daily mean °F (°C)	48.1 (8.9)	52.0 (11.1)	58.2 (14.6)	64.3 (17.9)	72.3 (22.4)	78.4 (25.8)	80.1 (26.7)	79.7 (26.5)	76.1 (24.5)	66.9 (19.4)	56.4 (13.6)	50.7 (10.4)	65.3 (18.5)
Mean daily minimum °F (°C)	36.0 (2.2)	39.6 (4.2)	45.3 (7.4)	51.7 (10.9)	59.6 (15.3)	66.9 (19.4)	69.1 (20.6)	68.6 (20.3)	64.7 (18.2)	54.1 (12.3)	43.0 (6.1)	38.7 (3.7)	53.1 (11.7)
Mean minimum °F (°C)	21.3 (−5.9)	24.0 (−4.4)	30.3 (−0.9)	37.6 (3.1)	49.6 (9.8)	59.7 (15.4)	66.3 (19.1)	64.9 (18.3)	54.6 (12.6)	38.3 (3.5)	30.8 (−0.7)	23.2 (−4.9)	17.3 (−8.2)
Record low °F (°C)	3 (−16)	11 (−12)	20 (−7)	30 (−1)	39 (4)	50 (10)	55 (13)	57 (14)	37 (3)	28 (−2)	19 (−7)	8 (−13)	3 (−16)
Average precipitation inches (mm)	5.89 (150)	4.66 (118)	5.39 (137)	5.55 (141)	3.78 (96)	7.48 (190)	7.68 (195)	6.89 (175)	6.50 (165)	4.40 (112)	4.81 (122)	4.61 (117)	67.64 (1,718)
Average snowfall inches (cm)	0.0 (0.0)	0.0 (0.0)	0.1 (0.25)	0.0 (0.0)	0.0 (0.0)	0.0 (0.0)	0.0 (0.0)	0.0 (0.0)	0.0 (0.0)	0.0 (0.0)	0.0 (0.0)	0.0 (0.0)	0.1 (0.25)
Average precipitation days (≥ 0.01 in)	9.6	7.7	8.2	6.4	6.9	11.0	14.6	13.2	8.1	6.9	7.3	7.8	107.7
Average snowy days (≥ 0.1 in)	0.0	0.0	0.1	0.0	0.0	0.0	0.0	0.0	0.0	0.0	0.0	0.0	0.1
Source 1: NOAA
Source 2: XMACIS2 (mean maxima/minima 1971–2000)

== Demographics ==
Historical population
Census	Pop.	Note	%±
1860	1,815		—
1870	1,014		−44.1%
1880	1,058		4.3%
1890	1,455		37.5%
1900	1,204		−17.3%
1910	831		−31.0%
1920	1,594		91.8%
1930	1,466		−8.0%
1940	1,851		26.3%
1950	2,040		10.2%
1960	4,108		101.4%
1970	5,360		30.5%
1980	7,206		34.4%
1990	7,216		0.1%
2000	7,045		−2.4%
2010	8,826		25.3%
2020	10,197		15.5%
2023 (est.)	10,957	▲	7.5%
U.S. Decennial Census; 2020 Census

=== Racial and ethnic composition ===
Milton, Florida – racial and ethnic composition Note: the US Census treats Hispanic/Latino as an ethnic category. This table excludes Latinos from the racial categories and assigns them to a separate category. Hispanics/Latinos may be of any race.
Race / ethnicity (NH = non-Hispanic)	Pop. 2000	Pop. 2010	Pop. 2020	% 2000	% 2010	% 2020
White alone (NH)	5,362	6,594	7,410	76.11%	74.71%	72.67%
Black or African American alone (NH)	1,096	1,200	1,120	15.56%	13.60%	10.98%
Native American or Alaska Native alone (NH)	50	62	53	0.71%	0.70%	0.52%
Asian alone (NH)	121	188	172	1.72%	2.13%	1.69%
Pacific Islander alone (NH)	9	19	51	0.13%	0.22%	0.50%
Other race alone (NH)	7	23	47	0.10%	0.26%	0.46%
Mixed race or multiracial (NH)	157	314	725	2.23%	3.56%	7.11%
Hispanic or Latino (any race)	243	426	619	3.45%	4.83%	6.07%
Total	7,045	8,826	10,197	100.00%	100.00%	100.00%

=== 2020 census ===
As of the 2020 census, Milton had a population of 10,197, with 4,026 households and 2,463 families. The median age was 37.1 years. 22.3% of residents were under the age of 18 and 18.4% of residents were 65 years of age or older. For every 100 females, there were 91.2 males, and for every 100 females age 18 and over, there were 88.4 males age 18 and over.

As of the 2020 census, 99.0% of residents lived in urban areas, while 1.0% lived in rural areas. Of households in Milton, 30.4% had children under the age of 18 living in them. Of all households, 39.9% were married-couple households, 20.1% were households with a male householder and no spouse or partner present, and 32.9% were households with a female householder and no spouse or partner present. About 30.4% of all households were made up of individuals and 13.4% had someone living alone who was 65 years of age or older.

As of the 2020 census, there were 4,443 housing units, of which 9.4% were vacant. The homeowner vacancy rate was 2.2% and the rental vacancy rate was 7.8%. The population density was 1,832.3 inhabitants per square mile (707.5/km^{2}). Housing unit density was 798.4 per square mile (308.3/km^{2}).

=== 2023 ACS estimates ===
As of the 2023 American Community Survey, there are 4,533 estimated households in Milton with an average of 2.24 persons per household. The city has a median household income of $72,676. Approximately 10.8% of the city's population lives at or below the poverty line. Milton has an estimated 53.9% employment rate, with 21.9% of the population holding a bachelor's degree or higher and 88.5% holding a high school diploma.

The top five reported ancestries (people were allowed to report up to two ancestries, thus the figures will generally add to more than 100%) were English (92.8%), Spanish (5.6%), Indo-European (1.0%), Asian and Pacific Islander (0.6%), and Other (0.0%).

The median age in the city was 38.0 years.

=== 2010 census ===
As of the 2010 census, there were 8,826 people, 3,516 households, and _ families residing in the city. The population density was 1,616.4 inhabitants per square mile (624.1/km^{2}). There were 4,021 housing units at an average density of 736.0 per square mile (284.2/km^{2}). The racial makeup of the city was 77.36% White, 13.90% African American, 0.73% Native American, 2.23% Asian, 0.26% Pacific Islander, 1.50% from some other races and 4.02% from two or more races. Hispanic or Latino people of any race were 4.83% of the population.

=== 2000 census ===
As of the 2000 census, there were 7,045 people, 2,674 households and 1,831 families residing in the city. The population density was 1,611.1 inhabitants per square mile (622.0/km^{2}). There were 3,151 housing units at an average density of 720.6 per square mile (278.2/km^{2}). The racial makeup of the town was 67.84% White, 25.95% African American, 0.71% Native American, 1.73% Asian, 0.17% Pacific Islander, 1.04% from some other races, and 2.56% from two or more races. Hispanic or Latino people of any race were 3.45% of the population.

There were 2,674 households, of which 33.9% had children under the age of 18 living with them, 49.7% were married couples living together, 15.6% had a female homeowner, and 31.5% were non-families. 27.2% of all households were made up of individuals, and 12.0% had someone living alone who was 65 years of age or older. The average household size was 2.51 and the average family size was 3.04.

27.3% of the population were under the age of 18, 8.9% from 18 to 24, 28.2% from 25 to 44, 18.8% from 45 to 64, and 16.8% who were 65 years of age or older. The median age was 34 years. For every 100 females, there were 86.2 males. For every 100 females age 18 and over, there were 81.1 males.

The median household income was $37,629, and the median family income was $44,261. Males had a median income of $35,000 versus $28,337 for females. The per capita income for the city was $19,367. About 11% of families and 16.7% of the population were below the poverty line, including 20.2% of those under age 18 and 11.7% of those age 65 or over.

== City information ==
Santa Rosa Medical Center (SRMC) is a 129-bed general hospital in Milton. SRMC is the primary provider of hospital-based healthcare services and emergency medicine in Santa Rosa County.

Milton is the home of the West Florida Railroad Museum, Blackwater-Heritage-State-Trail, and the historic Imogene Theater, owned and operated by the Santa Rosa Historical Society.

== Notable people ==
- Randy Allen, professional basketball player, shooting guard for Sacramento Kings
- Dan Amos, cofounder of Aflac
- Martha Beck, serial killer
- Mark Everett, professional sprinter, 1997 world indoor champion
- Greg Evers, Florida legislator and farmer
- Daniel Ewing, professional basketball player, NBA and Israeli Premier League
- Cortland Finnegan, NFL cornerback
- Dayton Hobbs, founder and pastor of independent Bible church in Milton, putative creator of tee-ball
- Bolley Johnson, member of Florida House of Representatives 1978–1994, speaker 1992–1994
- Chase Powers, comedy musician
- Reggie Slack, quarterback of NFL and Canadian Football League
- Heath Slocum, professional golfer on PGA Tour
- Kevin Stitt, governor of Oklahoma, businessman
- Lawrence Tynes, NFL placekicker
- Casper Van Dien, actor
- Rod Walker, NFL defensive tackle
- Bubba Watson, professional golfer on PGA Tour, two-time Masters champion
- Boo Weekley, professional golfer on PGA Tour
- Thomas F. West, Chief Justice of the Florida Supreme Court
- Elijah Williams, NFL cornerback
