= List of waterways forming and crossings of the Gulf Intracoastal Waterway =

This is a list of waterways that form the Gulf Intracoastal Waterway and crossings (bridges, tunnels and ferries) across it. The list runs from west to east (Brownsville, Texas to Carrabelle, Florida), in order of decreasing mile markers to Harvey, Louisiana and increasing after Harvey.

== Texas ==
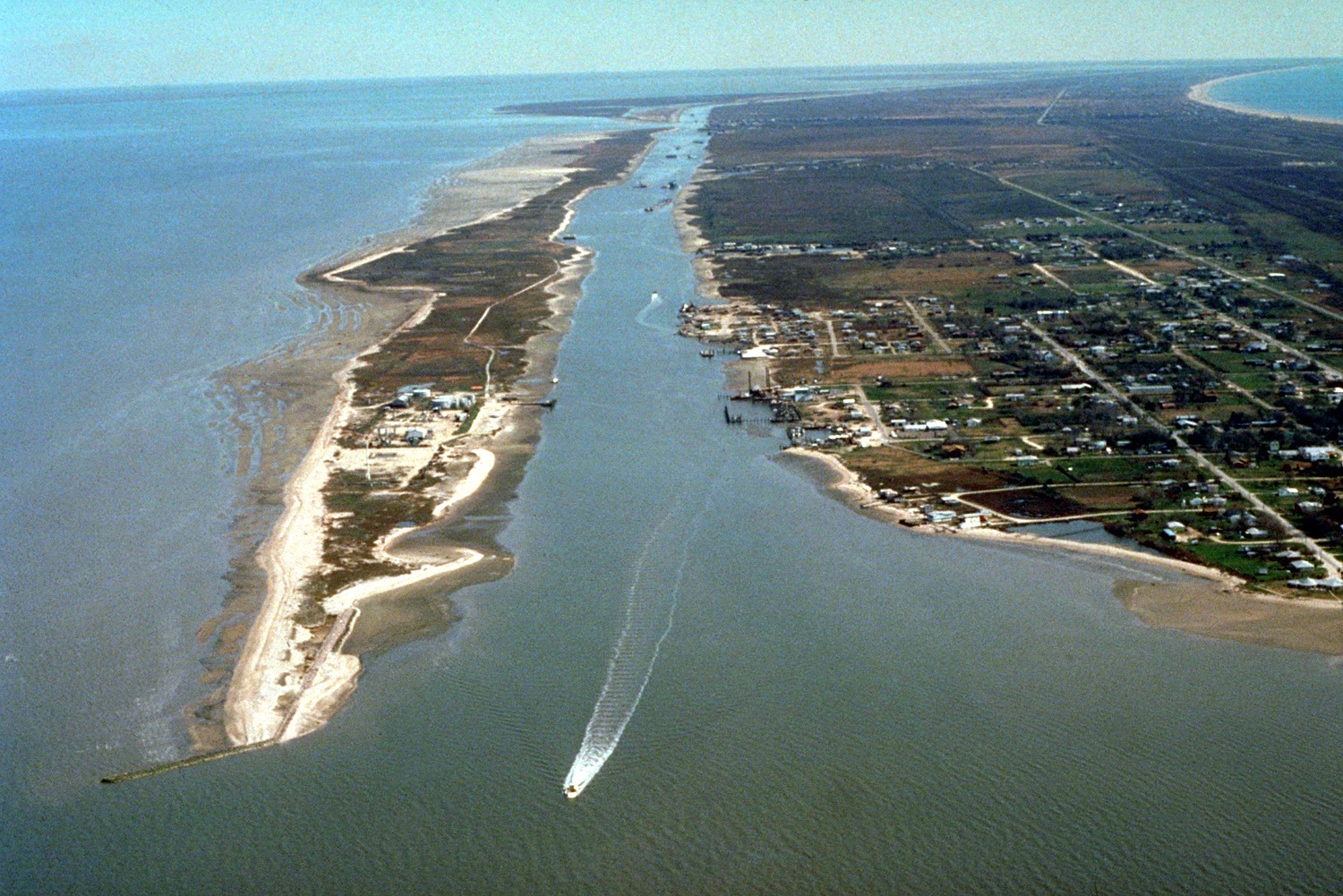
Gulf Intracoastal Waterway Galveston Bay

- Brownsville Ship Channel
- Port Isabel Ship Channel
  - South Garcia Street Drawbridge
- Laguna Madre
  - Queen Isabella Causeway (PR 100)
- Manmade canal
- Laguna Madre
- Manmade canal
- Baffin Bay
- Manmade canal
  - John F. Kennedy Memorial Causeway (PR 22)
- Corpus Christi Bay
- Manmade canal
- Redfish Bay
  - Redfish Bay Causeway (SH 361)
- Manmade canal
- Aransas Bay
- Manmade canal
- San Antonio Bay
- Manmade canal
- Matagorda Bay
- Manmade canal
- Oyster Lake
- Manmade canal
  - Colorado River Locks (West side)
- Colorado River
- Manmade canal
  - Colorado River Locks (East side)
  - FM 2031 Bridge (FM 2031)
- Manmade canal
- East Matagorda Bay
- Manmade canal
  - Sergeant Joe Parks, Jr. Memorial Bridge (FM 457)
- Manmade canal
- San Bernard River
- Manmade canal
- Brazos River
  - West Gate of the Brazos River
  - East Gate of the Brazos River
- Manmade canal
  - Quintana Swing Bridge (FM 1495)
  - Surfside Bridge (SH 332)
- Manmade canal
- Galveston Bay
- West Bay
  - Galveston Causeway (I-45/BNSF Railway/Union Pacific Railroad)
- Galveston Bay
  - Bolivar Ferry (SH 87)
- Manmade canal
- Sievers Cove
- Manmade canal
- East Bay
- Manmade canal
- Trinity River
- Manmade canal
  - Texas 124 Bridge (SH 124)
- Sabine–Neches Waterway
  - South Gulfway Drive Bridge (SH 87)
  - Taylor Bayou
  - Manmade canal
    - Martin Luther King Bridge (SH 82)
  - Neches River
  - Sabine Lake
  - Sabine River

== Louisiana ==
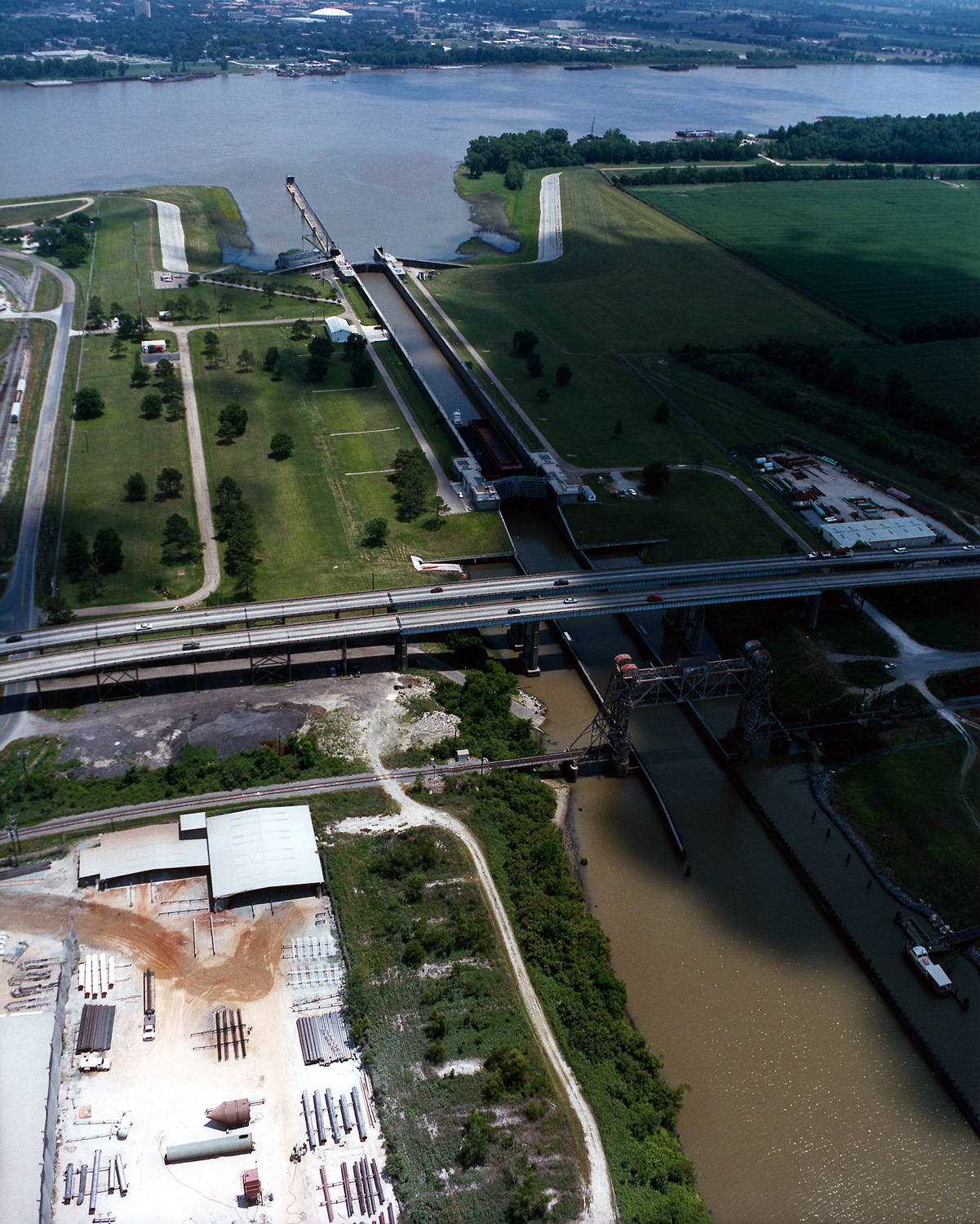
Port Allen Lock Louisiana aerial view

- Sabine River
- Manmade canal
  - Gum Cove Ferry
  - Ellender Bridge (LA 27)
- Calcasieu River
- Manmade canal
  - Black Bayou Pontoon Bridge (LA 384)
  - Grand Lake Pontoon Bridge (LA 384)
  - Gibbstown Bridge (LA 27)
  - Forked Island Bridge (LA 82)
  - Louisa Bridge (LA 319)
  - Ferry to Cote Blanche Island
  - LA 317 bridge at North Bend
- Atchafalaya River
- Bayou Boeuf
- Bayou Chene
- Bayou Black
- Bayou Cocodrie
- Lake Cocodrie
- Manmade canal
- Bayou Dularge
  - Bayou Dularge Bridge (LA 315)
- Houma Navigational Canal
  - Houma Tunnel (LA 3040)
  - East Main Street Bridge (LA 24 eastbound)
  - East Park Avenue Bridge (LA 24 westbound)
  - LA 3087 bridge
  - LA 316 bridge
- Larose-Bourg Cutoff (manmade)
  - West Larose Bridge (LA 1)
- Manmade canal
  - LA 308 bridge
- Bayou Barataria
  - LA 3134 bridge
- Harvey Canal (manmade)
  - Lapalco Boulevard Bridge
  - Harvey Tunnel and bridge (U.S. Highway 90 Business/Future I-49)
  - Harvey Canal Bridge (LA 18)
- Mississippi River
  - Jackson Avenue-Gretna Ferry
  - Crescent City Connection (U.S. Highway 90 Business/Future I-49)
  - Canal Street Ferry
- Industrial Canal (manmade)
  - St. Claude Avenue Bridge (LA 46)
  - Claiborne Avenue Bridge (LA 39)
  - Florida Avenue Bridge (road and railroad)
- Mississippi River-Gulf Outlet Canal (manmade)
  - Paris Road Bridge (LA 47)
- Manmade canal
- Lake Borgne

== Mississippi ==
- Mississippi Sound
  - Ship Island Ferry

== Alabama ==
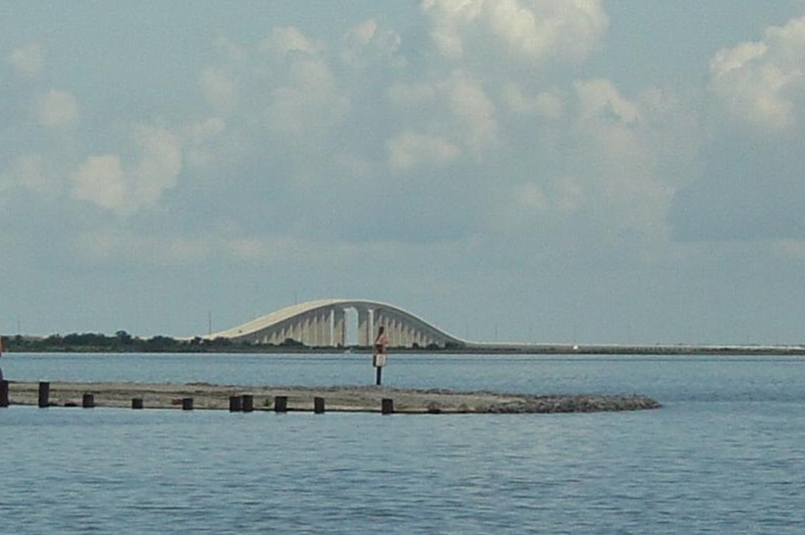
Gordon Persons Bridge to Dauphin Island

- Mississippi Sound
  - Dauphin Island Bridge (SR 193)
- Mobile Bay
- Bon Secour Bay
- Manmade canal
  - SR 59
  - Foley Beach Express
- Perdido Bay
  - Perdido Pass

== Florida ==
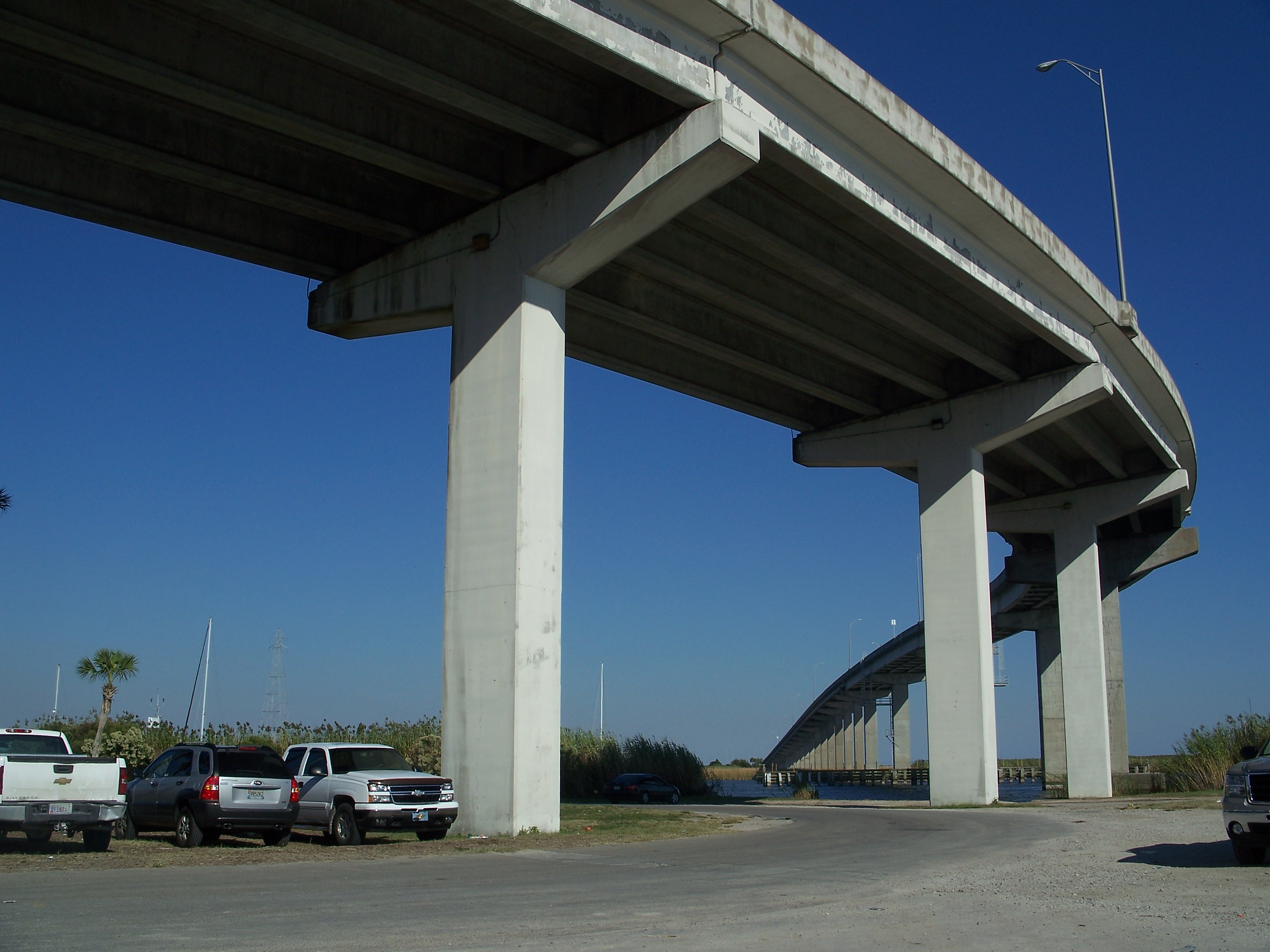
Apalachicola FL Gorrie Bridge US 98 US 319 east under01

- Big Lagoon
- Pensacola Bay
  - Pensacola Pass
- Santa Rosa Sound
  - Bob Sikes Bridge (CR 399)
  - Navarre Beach Causeway (CR 399)
  - Brooks Bridge (US 98)
- Choctawhatchee Bay
  - Mid-Bay Bridge (SR 293)
  - US 331
- West Bay
  - SR 79
  - US 98
- St. Andrews Bay
- East Bay
  - US 98
  - CR 386
  - SR 71
  - Manmade canal
- Apalachicola Bay
  - John Gorrie Bridge (US 98/US 319)
  - SR 300
- St. George Sound

== See also ==
- Waterways forming and crossings of the Atlantic Intracoastal Waterway
