= Santa Rosa Island, Florida =

Coordinates: 30°22′57″N 86°51′23″W

Santa Rosa Island The Island of Santa Rosa
- Island of Pensacola
- Nickname: SRI
- Interactive map of Santa Rosa Island
- Country: United States
- State: Florida
- Counties: Escambia, Santa Rosa, Okaloosa County, Florida
- Time zone: UTC-6 (CST)
- Area code: 850

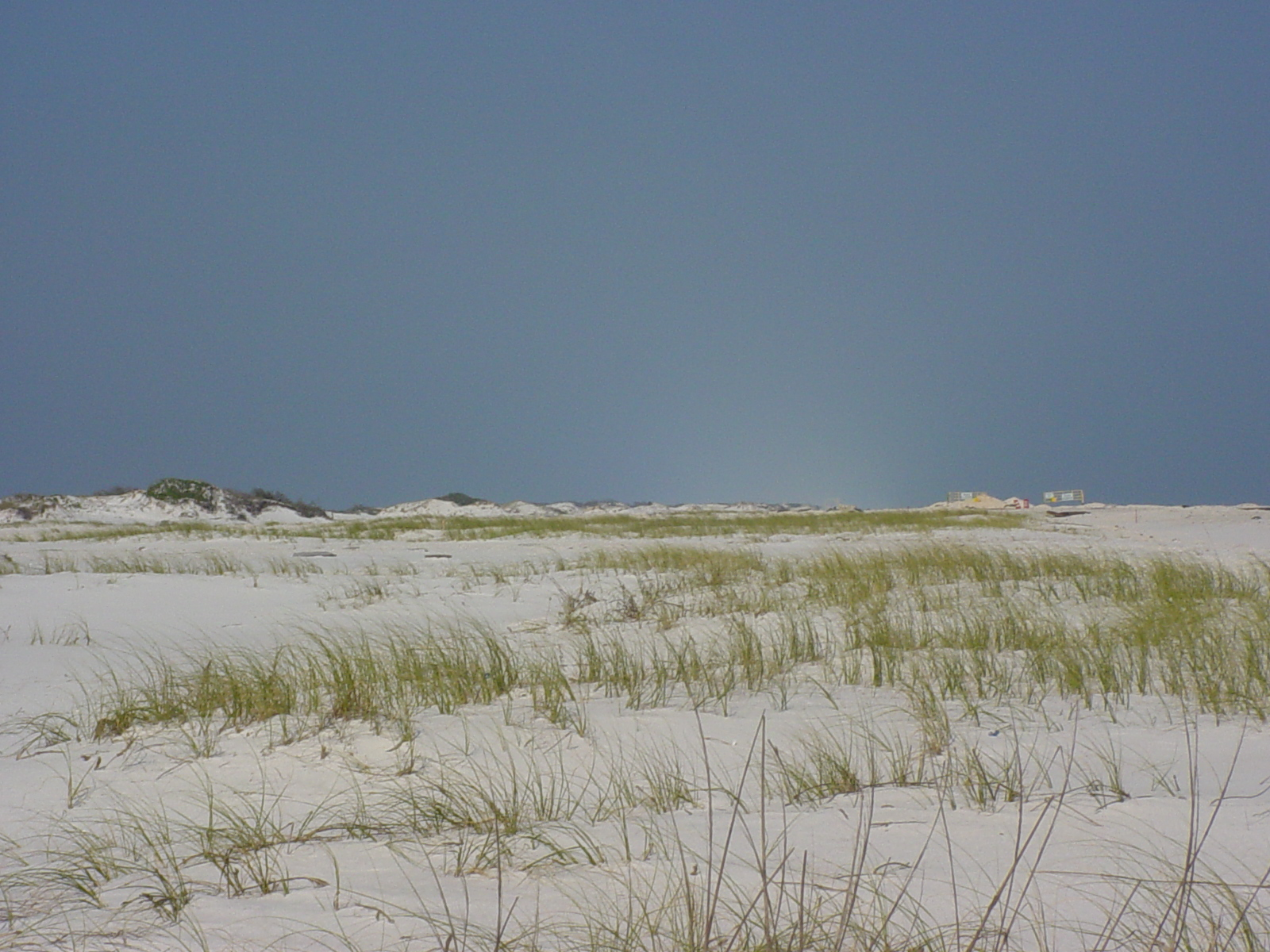
Santa Rosa Island, looking east, with characteristic sea oats.

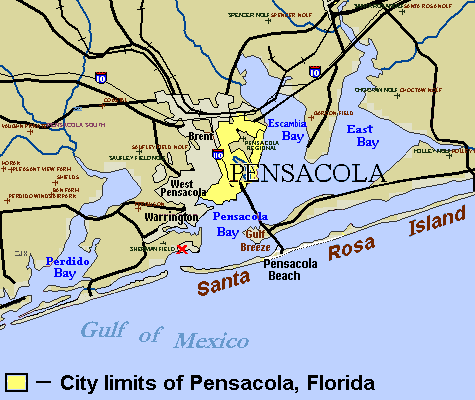
Map showing Santa Rosa Island south/east of Pensacola, Florida (right-click map to enlarge).

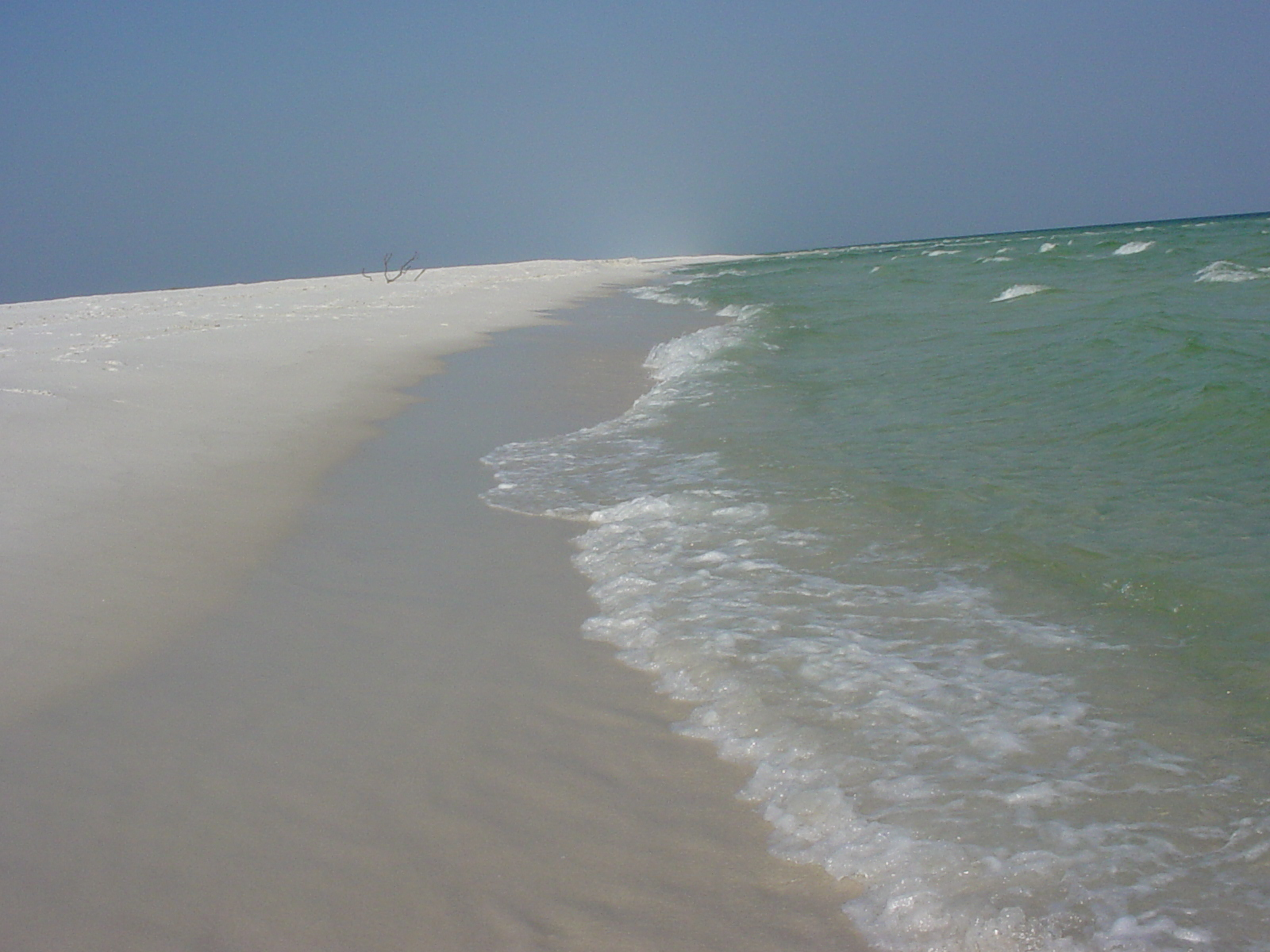
The Gulf of Mexico: the shining light in the back is from the sun's light being reflected off windblown particles of white sand from the beach.

Santa Rosa Island is a 40-mile (64 km) barrier island located in the U.S. state of Florida, thirty miles (48 km) east of the Alabama state border. The communities of Pensacola Beach, Navarre Beach, and Okaloosa Island are located on the island. On the northern side of the island, are Pensacola Bay on the west (see map) and Choctawhatchee Bay on the east, joined through Santa Rosa Sound.

Santa Rosa Island has weathered numerous hurricanes and other tropical cyclones, including the hurricane of September 1559, Hurricane Erin and Hurricane Opal (both in 1995), Hurricane Ivan (2004), Hurricane Dennis (2005), Tropical Storm Claudette (2009), and the remnants of Hurricane Ida (2009).

Parts of the island are protected from development within the Gulf Islands National Seashore.

== History ==
=== Pre-statehood ===
Santa Rosa Island was explored by Spanish conquistadors circa 1519. Years later, an expedition led by Tristan de Luna arrived from Vera Cruz (of New Spain) in August 1559 to found a settlement. Spanish settlements in the area were abandoned in 1561, following damage from storms, lack of supplies resulting in famine, and conflicts with the Pensacola natives.

After a treaty in 1722 returned Pensacola from French hands back to Spanish, the island was settled by Spain on November 25, 1722. The colony, Presidio Isla de Santa Rosa, was hit by hurricanes in 1741 and 1752 forcing the settlers to relocate across the bay to what is now Pensacola. The remaining remnants on the island were wiped out by a 1762 hurricane.

Following the Treaty of Moultrie Creek, Santa Rosa Island was inhabited by Creeks. During a visit in 1835, the famous painter George Catlin painted a Creek family catching and drying redfish on the island.

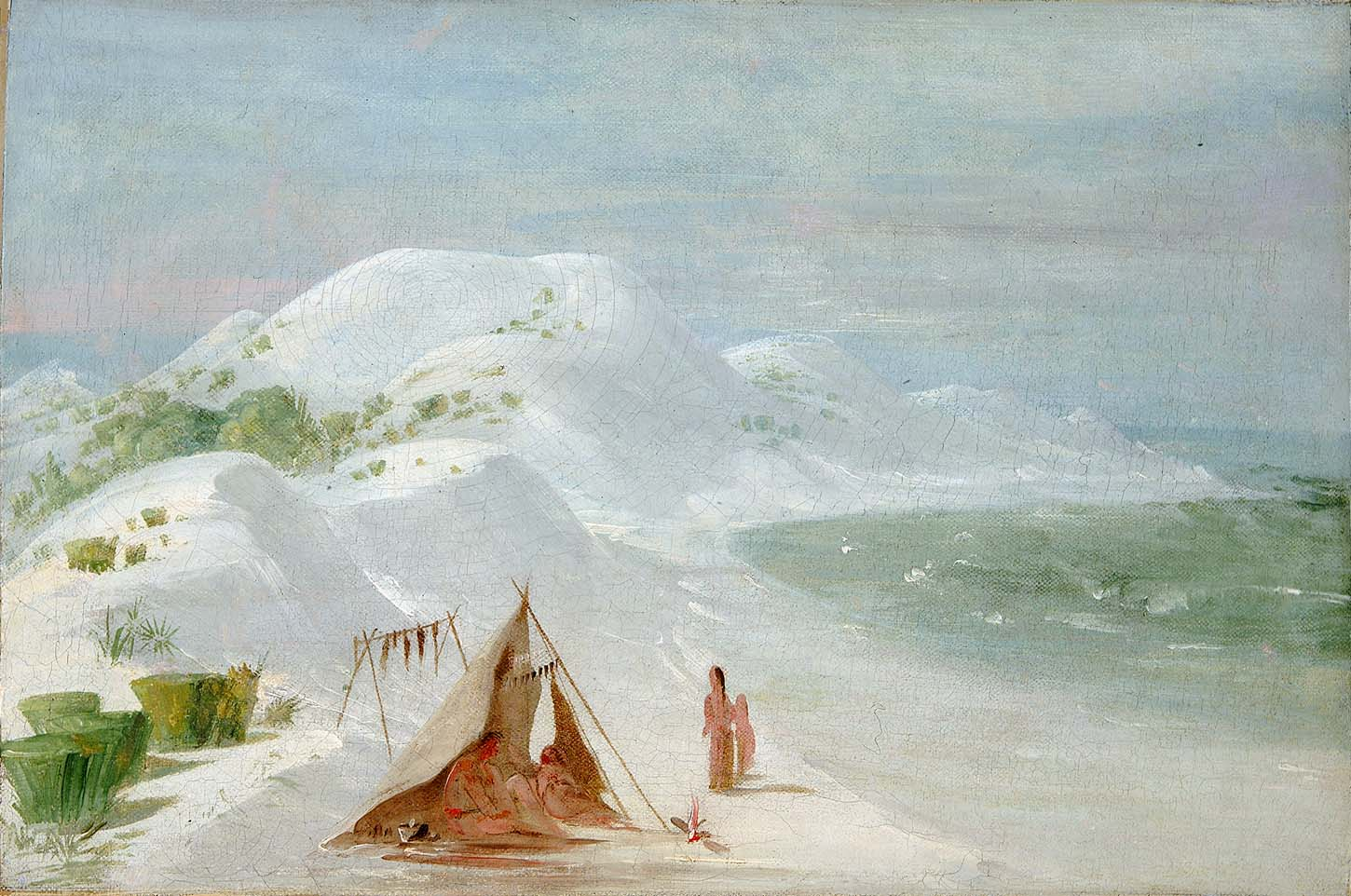
George Catlin - White Sand Bluffs, on Santa Rosa Island, Near Pensacola - 1985.66.354 - Smithsonian American Art Museum

=== American Civil War ===
After the outbreak of the American Civil War, some of the Union troops located within Confederate Florida retreated to Fort Pickens on the island.

The Battle of Santa Rosa Island took place here on October 9, 1861. Confederate Richard Anderson crossed from the Florida mainland onto Santa Rosa Island with 1200 men, in two small steamers, in a failed attempt to capture Fort Pickens (located on the west end of the island). In late 1863, the Union formed a recruiting post at the far east end of the island. By 1864, the garrison was reinforced by a large number of deserters and others who were pro-Union. The sheriff and some of the prominent citizens of the town served as guides and supplied the Union force with horses for raiding. The fort remained in Federal hands throughout the war.

=== 20th century ===
Considering Fort Pickens to be outdated, the U.S. War Department sold Santa Rosa Island in 1929 to Escambia County, Florida, for US$10,000. Ten years later, the county returned the island to the federal government in the expectation that it would be developed as a U.S. national monument preserving the remnants of Fort Pickens; President Roosevelt created Santa Rosa Island National Monument in 1939 but it was abolished seven years later. The fort and other areas are now preserved within the Gulf Islands National Seashore, created in 1971.

On July 8, 1950, the federal government conveyed an 875-acre (3.54 km^{2}) parcel of Santa Rosa Island with 3 miles (4.8 km) of Gulf frontage to Okaloosa County. The county paid the federal government $4,000 to complete the transaction, which was supported by Congressman Bob Sikes. The portion of Santa Rosa Island transferred is now known as Okaloosa Island. The twelve-mile (19 km) long beach road onto U.S. Air Force property, west of the Okaloosa Island portion of Santa Rosa Boulevard, was unguarded and accessible into the 1990s, but heightened security concerns have since led to it being guarded or blocked at all times. Various military missile launch and test facilities exist on Santa Rosa Island south and southwest of Hurlburt Field.

The island has been hit by many tropical cyclones; in 1995 it was the landfall point of hurricanes Erin and Opal. Hurricane Dennis hit the island in July 2005, and with 120 mph (190 km/h) winds, was the strongest storm to do so. Tropical Storm Claudette hit in 2009.

In 2008–2009, a sunken Spanish ship was located and excavated offshore.

The final mission in the Florida Phase of the US Army's Ranger School is conducted on Santa Rosa Island.

== See also ==
- Bob Sikes Bridge, a bridge to the island from Gulf Breeze, Florida
- Navarre Beach Causeway, a bridge to the island from Navarre, Florida
- Brooks Bridge, a bridge to the island from Fort Walton Beach, Florida
- Dome of a Home, a dome-shaped house on the island built to withstand 133 m/s (300 mph) winds
- Fort Pickens, a historic fort on the island
