= Hurricane Erin (1995) =

Category 2 Atlantic hurricane

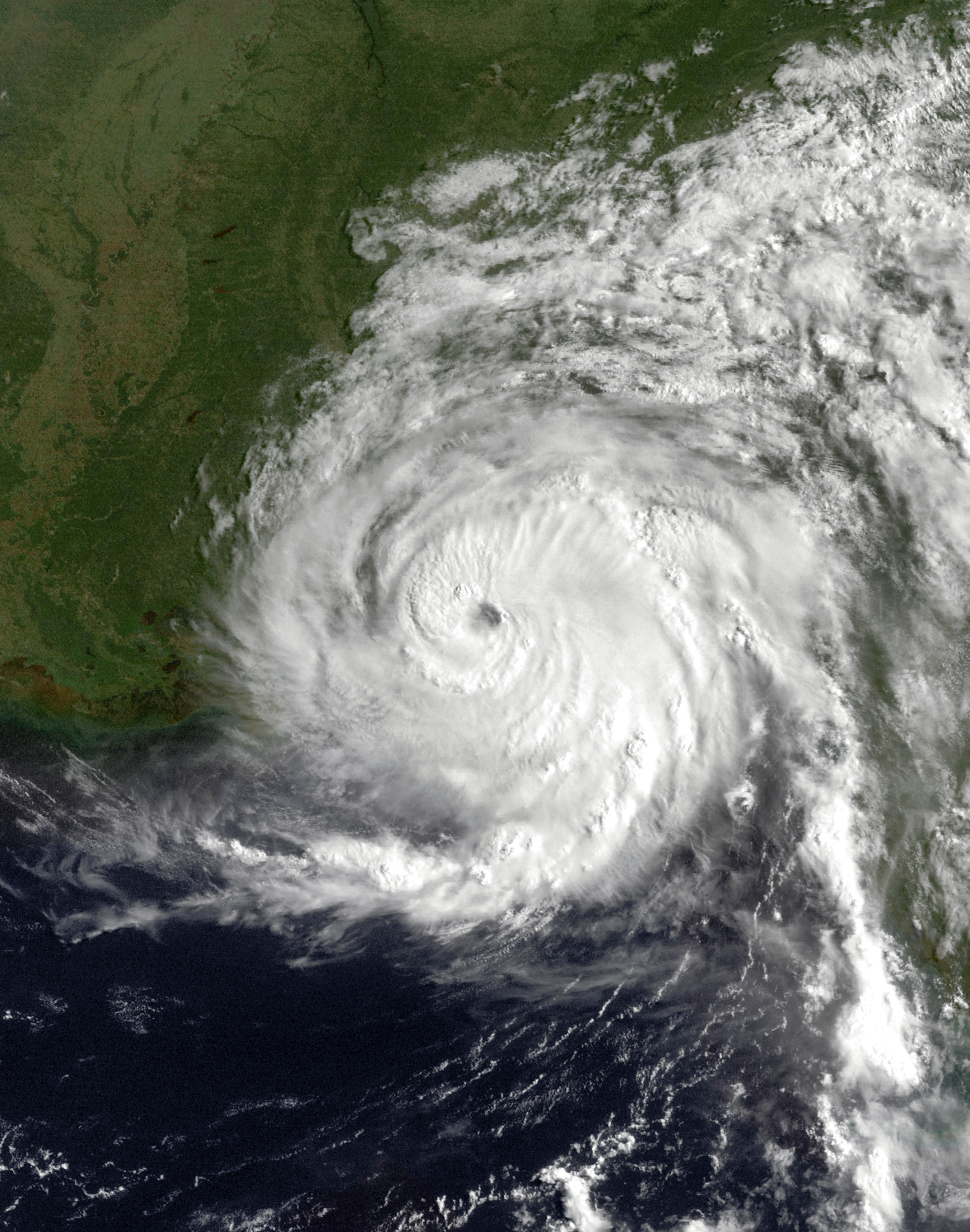
- Erin at peak intensity shortly before landfall in Pensacola on August 3

Meteorological history
- Formed: July 31, 1995
- Dissipated: August 6, 1995

Category 2 hurricane
- 1-minute sustained (SSHWS/NWS)
- Highest winds: 100 mph (155 km/h)
- Lowest pressure: 973 mbar (hPa); 28.73 inHg

Overall effects
- Fatalities: 16 (6 direct, 10 indirect)
- Damage: $700 million (1995 USD)
- Areas affected: Bahamas, Jamaica, Eastern United States, Louisiana, Arkansas, Missouri, Florida, Alabama, Mississippi
- IBTrACS
- Part of the 1995 Atlantic hurricane season

Hurricane Erin was the first hurricane to strike the contiguous United States since Hurricane Andrew in 1992. The fifth tropical cyclone, fifth named storm, and second hurricane of the unusually active 1995 Atlantic hurricane season, Erin developed from a tropical wave near the southeastern Bahamas on July 31. Moving northwestward, the cyclone intensified into a Category 1 hurricane on the Saffir–Simpson scale near Rum Cay about 24 hours later. After a brief jog to the north-northwest on August 1, Erin began moving to the west-northwest. The cyclone then moved over the northwestern Bahamas, including the Abaco Islands and Grand Bahama. Early on August 2, Erin made landfall near Vero Beach, Florida, with winds of 85 mph (137 km/h). The hurricane weakened while crossing the Florida peninsula and fell to tropical storm intensity before emerging into the Gulf of Mexico later that day.

Early on August 3, Erin re-intensified into a Category 1 hurricane. Strengthening further, the cyclone very briefly strengthened into a Category 2 hurricane, peaking with maximum sustained winds of 100 mph (160 km/h) as the eyewall moved ashore at Fort Walton Beach, Florida. Erin then weakened slightly to a Category 1 hurricane while brushing the coast of the Florida Panhandle, before making landfall at Pensacola Beach later on August 3 with winds 85 mph (137 km/h). After moving inland, the system quickly weakened to a tropical storm over Mississippi early on August 4 and then to a tropical depression several hours later. Erin proceeded to move northeastward and then eastward across the interior of the Eastern United States, prior to merging with a frontal system in West Virginia on August 6.

The outer bands of Erin caused seven deaths in Jamaica, with five due to a plane crash and the other two after lightning struck two teenage boys. Much of the Bahamas experienced impact from the storm, including all islands between Mayaguana and Grand Bahama. However, damage was generally minor, totaling about $400,000 (1995 USD). (Note: All damage figures are in 1995 USD, unless otherwise noted) In Florida, observation stations recorded sustained winds up to 86 mph (138 km/h) at the Sebastian Inlet and gusts up to 101 mph (163 km/h) at the Pensacola Naval Air Station. Over 1 million people throughout Florida lost electricity during the storm. More than 5,000 homes and buildings suffered some degree of damage, with most in Brevard County and the western Florida Panhandle. Nine deaths occurred in Florida, with six by drowning and three by indirect causes. In Alabama, the storm damaged more than 100 homes throughout the state, as well as 17 schools and 50 to 75 percent of the pecan crops in Baldwin County alone. Several other states reported minor flooding and wind damage. Throughout the United States, Erin caused around $700 million in damage, with much of that incurred in Florida.

== Meteorological history ==
Map plotting the storm's track and intensity, according to the Saffir–Simpson scale Map key Saffir–Simpson scale Tropical depression (≤38 mph, ≤62 km/h) Tropical storm (39–73 mph, 63–118 km/h) Category 1 (74–95 mph, 119–153 km/h) Category 2 (96–110 mph, 154–177 km/h) Category 3 (111–129 mph, 178–208 km/h) Category 4 (130–156 mph, 209–251 km/h) Category 5 (≥157 mph, ≥252 km/h) Unknown Storm type Tropical cyclone Subtropical cyclone Extratropical cyclone, remnant low, tropical disturbance, or monsoon depression

A tropical wave emerged into the Atlantic Ocean from the west coast of Africa on July 22. The system, accompanied by two distinct low-level circulation centers and a large area of convection, moved westward or west-northwestward throughout much of its duration due to the influence of the Bermuda high-pressure area and a second high-pressure area over the Mid-Atlantic region of the United States. Both circulations generated deep convection by July 27 while situated a few hundred miles northeast of the Leeward Islands. Near midday on July 30, T-number estimates reached 2.5, indicative of tropical storm strength. As a result of the system's organization and its proximity to the Bahamas and Florida, reconnaissance aircraft flights flew into the system between July 28 and July 30, but did not locate a closed circulation. Southwesterly vertical wind shear generated by an upper-level low-pressure area initially prevented further tropical cyclogenesis. A special overnight flight into the system located a closed circulation. As a result, Tropical Storm Erin developed just west of the Turks and Caicos Islands around 00:00 UTC on July 31.

Hurricane Erin at first landfall in Central Florida

Erin continued to develop slowly, persistently hindered by wind shear. In their first advisory on the storm, the National Hurricane Center (NHC) predicted very slow strengthening due to the center of circulation being located outside of the deep convection. The storm steadily intensified while moving slowly west-northwestward and became a Category 1 hurricane near Rum Cay around 00:00 UTC on August 1, after a reconnaissance aircraft flight observed flight-level winds of 99 mph (159 km/h) and satellite imagery noted a more well-defined system and hints of an eye developing. Thereafter, Erin accelerated somewhat from a forward speed of 6 to 17 mph (9.7 to 27.4 km/h) and then briefly jogged northwestward due to an upper-level low pressure area near Florida. On August 1, the hurricane passed over or very close to several islands in the Bahamas, including Cat Island, Eleuthera, the Abaco Islands, and Grand Bahama. Around 06:15 UTC on August 2, Erin made landfall near Vero Beach, Florida, with winds of 85 mph (137 km/h), based on a similar wind speed observed at the Florida Institute of Technology anemometer at the Sebastian Inlet. The cyclone became the first hurricane to strike the United States since Hurricane Andrew in 1992. Although the storm remained well-organized while crossing the Florida peninsula – except for losing its eye feature – it quickly weakened to a tropical storm by about six hours later, with winds falling to 60 mph (97 km/h).

After emerging into the eastern Gulf of Mexico later on August 2, Erin quickly re-intensified into a Category 1 by 00:00 UTC on August 3 while curving back to the northwest. A portion of the eyewall moved ashore at Fort Walton Beach, Florida, around 13:30 UTC on August 3. At the time, Doppler wind data from the local National Weather Service office noted wind speeds in excess of 115 mph (185 km/h) at 9,800 ft (3,000 m) above ground, which translates to approximately 100 mph (160 km/h) sustained winds on the ground. As a result, Erin was upgraded to a Category 2 hurricane in post-analysis and peaked with maximum sustained winds of 100 mph (160 km/h) and a minimum barometric pressure of 973 mbar (28.7 inHg). The storm remained near the coast and weakened slightly before making landfall in Pensacola Beach, Florida, around 16:00 UTC on August 3 with winds of 85 mph (137 km/h). With the landfall, Erin became the first hurricane to strike the Pensacola area since a storm in 1926. Erin initially weakened quickly after moving inland, falling to tropical storm intensity over southern Mississippi around 00:00 UTC on the following day, before deteriorating to a tropical depression over central Mississippi roughly 12 hours later. The cyclone then turned northward close to the Mississippi River along the Arkansas–Tennessee state line early on August 5, before curving northeastward shortly thereafter and then eastward over southern Indiana and Ohio. The storm merged with a frontal system over West Virginia around 12:00 UTC on August 6.

== Preparations ==
=== Cuba and the Bahamas ===
In Cuba, emergency teams in Ciego de Ávila Province went on alert on August 1. Civil defense officials also began mitigating for potential impacts.

The Government of the Bahamas issued several tropical cyclone warnings and watches for the archipelago. Beginning at 03:30 UTC on July 31, a tropical storm warning went into effect for the central and southeastern Bahamas and a tropical storm watch for the northwestern Bahamas, before the government upgraded the watch to a warning at 09:00 UTC. The tropical storm warning was then increased to a hurricane warning for the entire country at 15:00 UTC. The Bahamian government gradually canceled the warning for sections of the nation as Erin moved toward Florida, with the no portion of the warning remaining after 01:00 UTC on August 2. The government of the Bahamas also assisted with evacuating coastal residents and opening shelters staffed by the Red Cross and government agencies. On July 31, the Freeport Airport closed.

=== Florida ===
In Florida, watches and warnings issued in anticipation began at 03:30 UTC on July 31, with a tropical storm watch from the Sebastian Inlet southward on the east coast and from Venice southward on the west coast, including Florida Bay and all of the Florida Keys. Eleven and a half hours later, the NHC upgraded the east coast, Florida Bay, and Florida Keys portion of the watch to a hurricane warning, while raising the existing tropical storm watch from Venice to Everglades City to a hurricane watch and also placing Lake Okeechobee under a hurricane watch. The NHC shifted warnings northward as Erin appeared to be a more imminent threat to the east coast of Central Florida, rather than the Gold Coast or Florida Keys. At 15:00 UTC on August 1, the hurricane warning stretched from New Smyrna Beach southward to the Florida Keys. Also on August 1, the NHC posted additional watches and warnings along the west coast and Florida Panhandle. After the storm moved inland over Central Florida on the following day, the NHC discontinued watches and warnings on the east coast, but issued a hurricane warning from the Suwannee River westward at 19:00 UTC. The NHC removed this warning and all others on August 3 after Erin made landfall in the Florida Panhandle.

Florida governor Lawton Chiles declared a state of emergency on July 31 for Central and South Florida, allowing for the activation of the Florida National Guard and for county officials to issue evacuation orders. That same day, the NHC website experienced a significant spike in traffic, with approximately 100,000 views on the home page between noon and midnight. Computer servers became unable to handle the additional web traffic and data phone lines became tied up, causing the NHC to shut down the website on August 1. Mandatory evacuations were initially posted for 800,000 people in Florida in preparation. As the storm shifted farther north, the evacuation order was reduced to roughly 400,000 people. Many banks, universities, and shopping malls across Florida closed their doors. State officials suspended tolls on Florida's Turnpike, while local officials temporarily removed tolls from Central Florida toll roads. A high demand for bottled water resulted in Publix producing one truckload of water bottles, equivalent to about 9,000 US gal (34,000 L; 7,500 imp gal) of water, roughly every 90 minutes at their facility in Lakeland. As Erin approached Central Florida, approximately 14,000 people stayed overnight at the 200 shelters opened throughout the state.

Many people on the east coast were wary of Erin due to recollections of the devastation wrought by Hurricane Andrew just three years earlier. Officials in the Florida Keys ordered the evacuation of residents living in mobile homes, with the Red Cross opening 17 shelters that could collectively house 15,285 people. Additionally, tens of thousands of vacationers left the Florida Keys. Officials in Miami-Dade, Broward, and Palm Beach counties combined ordered the evacuation of close to 650,000 people. St. Lucie County officials issued a mandatory evacuation for coastal residents, an order followed by around 30,000 people. Around 600 people stayed at a shelter in the county. In Brevard County, approximately 100,000 people living on barrier islands received orders to evacuate. NASA rolled back Space Shuttle Endeavour from the launchpad to the Vehicle Assembly Building at Kennedy Space Center due to Erin. A flood watch and high wind watch were issued for all of eastern Central Florida. Tornado watches and warnings were also issued for eastern Central Florida. Central Florida theme parks including Cypress Gardens and Splendid China closed for one day. Although other attractions such as Disney World, SeaWorld, and Universal Studios did not close for the storm, they opened a few hours later than normal on August 2.

Residents and some officials in the western Florida Panhandle may have been inadvertently lulled into a false perception of security due to the NHC projections showing the storm striking near Apalachee Bay, while advisories later on August 2 indicated a landfall in Mississippi. As a result, evacuation orders were issued with short notice. Approximately 10,000 coastal residents in the Florida Panhandle evacuated, though only about 600 people stayed at a local shelter. However, of the others who evacuated, approximately 1,300 people stayed at a shelter in Escambia County and 500 people at shelters in Santa Rosa County. Emergency workers sent evacuation notices to 2,003 residences of Pensacola Beach by pre-recorded phone messages just hours before Erin made landfall. A total of 812 people evacuated from the community as a result. Overall, only about 30–40 percent of those ordered to evacuate chose to do so. In Escambia County, the police department dispatched 50–60 vehicles to patrol against looting. Roughly 300 military aircraft in the Florida Panhandle were evacuated to bases in Georgia, Kentucky, Mississippi, North Carolina, Ohio, South Carolina, Texas, and Virginia.

=== Elsewhere ===
The NHC also issued tropical cyclone warnings and watches in Alabama, Louisiana, and Mississippi. At 15:00 UTC on August 2, the NHC posted a tropical storm watch from Pensacola, Florida, westward to the mouth of the Pearl River. The NHC upgraded the watch to a hurricane warning four hours later. By 05:00 UTC on August 3, the hurricane warning stretched from the Suwannee River in Florida to Morgan City, Louisiana. However, as the storm turned inland over the Florida Panhandle on August 3, all hurricane warnings were discontinued by that afternoon. On August 2, Alabama governor Fob James declared a state of emergency. In Baldwin County, officials recommended evacuation of Dauphin Island, as well as for those living in low-lying areas and mobile homes. Two shelters opened in the county. Mississippi governor Kirk Fordice declared a state of emergency. At least 20 shelters opened in the state, all of them in the coastal counties of Hancock, Harrison, and Jackson. A total of 12 casinos in the three counties closed on August 3. Some 180 state prisoners in Harrison and Jackson counties were moved farther inland. In Louisiana, governor Edwin Edwards declared a state of emergency. Approximately 9,400 people received mandatory evacuation orders, with 8,000 from outlying areas of Plaquemines Parish and 1,400 from Grand Isle. Roughly 95% of the latter evacuated, with those remaining mostly being emergency workers and volunteers.

== Impact ==
Wettest tropical cyclones and their remnants in the Bahamas Highest-known totals
Precipitation			Storm	Location	Ref.
Rank	mm	in	Storm	Location	Ref.
1	747.5	29.43	Noel 2007	Long Island	
2	580.1	22.84	Dorian 2019	Hope Town	
3	500.3	19.70	Matthew 2016	Matthew Town, Inagua	
4	436.6	17.19	Flora 1963	Duncan Town	
5	390.1	15.36	Inez 1966	Nassau Airport	
6	337.1	13.27	Fox 1952	New Providence	
7	321.1	12.64	Michelle 2001	Nassau	
8	309.4	12.18	Erin 1995	Church Grove	
9	260.0	9.88	Fay 2008	Freeport	
10	236.7	9.32	Floyd 1999	Little Harbor Abacos	

Hurricane Erin resulted in a total of 16 fatalities, with 9 in the United States (all in Florida) and 7 in Jamaica. The storm caused approximately $700 million in damage, almost entirely in the United States.

=== Jamaica and the Bahamas ===
In Jamaica, heavy rains generated by the far outer bands of Erin caused a plane crash that killed five people. The plane, a Cessna 310 twin-engine aircraft owned by RegionAir, carried four employees of Brinks Jamaica, who were due to testify in a court hearing, and a pilot. The plane departed from the Tinson Pen Aerodrome in Kingston, and was bound for Montego Bay, Saint James Parish. Two teenagers were also killed on a football field in Braeton, Saint Catherine Parish, when lightning associated with Erin struck them.

A tornado spawned by the storm on Providenciales in the Turks and Caicos Islands produced a wind gust up to 147 mph (237 km/h). In the Bahamas, sustained wind speeds peaked at 81 mph (130 km/h) on Cat Island, while wind gusts topped out at 102 mph (164 km/h) on Grand Bahama. Erin also dropped heavy rainfall in some areas, including a total of 12.18 in (309 mm) at Church Grove on Crooked Island. All islands of the Bahamas between Mayaguana and Grand Bahama sustained damage, though the Bahamas Department of Meteorology described the impact as mostly minor. Much of the damage came from sunken boats. Some of the other damage resulted from structural damage and crop losses, especially to avocados, bananas, mangoes, and watermelon. Damage totaled at least $400,000.

=== Florida ===
In Florida, the Sebastian Inlet recorded the highest observed sustained wind speed in the state, at 86 mph (138 km/h). Wind gusts topped out at 101 mph (163 km/h) at the Pensacola Naval Air Station. Many other locations in and central and north Florida, as well as in the Florida Panhandle, measured tropical storm-force or hurricane-force wind gusts. The hurricane generally dropped light rainfall, mainly except in areas close to the path. Melbourne International Airport observed 10.84 in (275 mm) of precipitation, the highest total in the state. Much of the Atlantic and Gulf coasts of Florida experienced abnormally high tides and storm surge, including 2 to 4 ft (0.61 to 1.22 m) surge on the east coast and 1 to 2 ft (0.30 to 0.61 m) on much of the west coast. In the panhandle, Navarre Beach likely experienced 6 to 7 ft (1.8 to 2.1 m) storm surge, while Pensacola Beach recorded 3 to 4 ft (0.91 to 1.22 m) storm surge. Minor to moderate beach erosion occurred along Florida's Atlantic and Gulf coasts.

More than one million people throughout the state lost power due to Erin. The hurricane damaged thousands of homes, particularly in Brevard County and the western panhandle. Erin caused approximately $700 million in damage in the United States, with much of that occurring in Florida. The cyclone resulted in nine deaths in the state, six directly and three indirectly. A surfer drowned offshore Palm Beach County, while waves at Cape San Blas washed a father and daughter out to sea, where they presumably drowned. The Club Royale, a 234 ft (71 m) gambling and cruise ship, sank roughly 90 mi (140 km) east of Cape Canaveral. Three people went missing and likely drowned after the ship sank, though seven other people were rescued by the United States Coast Guard and another person by a passing ship. There were also two storm-related heart attacks, one in Fort Pierce and the other in Tampa. A ninth fatality occurred in Palm City when a stack of plywood in a garage fell over, crushing a man.

The storm left mostly minimal impact in South Florida, with wind gusts just barely reaching tropical storm-force. Much of the Miami metropolitan area observed 2 to 6 in (51 to 152 mm) of rainfall, causing only minor flooding. Along the coast of Palm Beach County, minor to moderate beach erosion occurred. Rough seas caused a 55 ft (17 m) ketch to run aground near Riviera Beach, necessitating the rescue of six people. In the Treasure Coast – Indian River, Martin, and St. Lucie counties – the storm produced sustained winds up to 86 mph (138 km/h) at the Sebastian Inlet. Although no wind gust was reported from the inlet, Vero Beach recorded a wind gust of 70 mph (110 km/h). Despite being directly struck by the hurricane, the three-county region and the adjacent inland counties of Okeechobee and southern Osceola did not experience significant impact, with effects mainly limited to downed trees and signs and minor flooding. The storm damaged two homes in Indian River County. Only 17,000 businesses and homes in Indian River, Martin, and St. Lucie counties combined lost electricity.

The worst impacts along the east coast of Florida occurred in Brevard County, where anemometers measured surface wind gusts up to 76 mph (122 km/h) at the Melbourne International Airport. NASA noted a maximum wind gust of 82 mph (132 km/h) atop a wind tower at the Kennedy Space Center. However, no records were taken at several sites in the county due to the evacuation of the observers. Based on wind damage, it was estimated that wind gusts remained under 90 mph (140 km/h) in most areas, though some isolated locations may have experienced wind gusts around 100 mph (160 km/h). Winds left approximately 151,000 homes and businesses in the county without electricity. Downed power lines ignited a few house fires, which burned down two homes. In coastal towns such as Indian Harbour Beach, Melbourne Beach, and Satellite Beach, winds caused major damage to the roofs and walls of dozens of condominiums and high-rise hotels. A number of smaller buildings and homes sustained substantial damage or suffered complete destruction. Strong winds at the Melbourne International Airport damaged five airplanes. Heavy rainfall left several major and secondary roads impassable in Melbourne and Palm Bay, including some lanes of Interstate 95. Rainwater caused the roof of a large department store to collapse, while heavy precipitation flooded more than 100 businesses and homes. Erin spawned three tornadoes in Brevard County, two F0s and one F1. Both F0s caused minimal damage. The F1 tornado, spawned in Titusville damaged power lines, signs, and the roofs of a Sears store and a McDonald's restaurant. One person suffered injuries after the tornado shattered a large window. In all, Erin completely destroyed 37 structures, severely damaged 81 structures, and slightly damaged 443 other structures throughout Brevard County.

While southern Osceola County suffered relatively little damage, the storm caused more impact in northern portions of the county, which experienced sustained tropical storm-force winds. In the northern Osceola County, particularly in the cities of Buenaventura Lakes, Kissimmee, and St. Cloud, winds toppled trees onto about two dozen homes and removed roofs or siding from several mobile homes. In Kissimmee, the fire department lost portions of its roof and then rain entered the building, causing $25,000–$50,000 in damage. At the Osceola County Stadium, winds downed outfield fences and damaged a dugout roof and press box windows. The Arcade Theatre in downtown Kissimmee lost its sign after being shattered in the wind. Approximately 22,000 businesses and homes lost electricity throughout the county, but most outages were restored within hours. Additionally, Erin spawned an F1 tornado near Lake Lizzie, located about 3 mi (4.8 km) east of St. Cloud. Although the twister mostly moved through a wooded area, the tornado also downed a tree onto a home, which destroyed it, and killed two horses. In Orange County, Erin produced wind gusts up to 62 mph (100 km/h) at the Orlando International Airport. Winds downed many trees and power lines, leaving approximately one-third of households in the county without power. A pump system failed after the electricity went out, causing raw sewage to flood a home beyond repairs in southwestern Orange County. The storm destroyed 65 homes and damaged 18 businesses. Roughly $1 million in property damage occurred across the county.

In Volusia County, roughly 26,000 households lost electricity. Ten cars suffered damage after winds tore off a section of the roof of a condominium of New Smyrna Beach. Winds also toppled a church steeple and damaged two homes. Moderate beach erosion occurred along the coast, including a 15 by 4 ft (4.6 by 1.2 m) section of sand washing away at Ponce Inlet Park. Damage in Seminole County was light. The storm left widespread power outages. Among the buildings losing electricity included a sewage treatment plant in Winter Springs, which caused approximately 40,000 gallons of raw sewage to spill into wetlands close by. In Lake County, winds caused the loss of electricity at thousands of businesses and homes. Several mobile homes at a community in Clermont were deroofed, causing police to evacuate the trailer park. A tornado touched down near Mascotte, but only damaged some trees. Farther north, wind gusts in the First Coast region peaked at 60 mph (97 km/h) at the marina in Fernandina Beach. The storm downed many trees and power lines and damaged a number of roofs in the region, but mostly minor damage occurred otherwise. About 10,000 customers lost electricity in St. Johns County. Two tornadoes touched down in the region. The first tornado toppled many trees on State Road A1A on southern Amelia Island, while the second twister partially deroofed a mall in Jacksonville Beach.

A storm spotter in Polk County observed a wind gust of 70 mph (110 km/h) in Lake Wales. The storm left thousands of people without electricity in the county, including 3,000 customers in Lakeland. Downed trees and power lines were reported throughout the county, but little other damage occurred. Charlotte, DeSoto, Lee, and Manatee counties experienced little impact other than some residences losing power, falling trees, and minor street flooding. The Tampa Bay area experienced wind gusts reaching 49 mph (79 km/h) at the Sunshine Skyway Bridge. A total of 31,789 customers lost electricity in the region, many in the vicinity of Town 'n' Country. With tides ranging from 1 to 2 ft (0.30 to 0.61 m) above mean sea level in Hillsborough, southwestward Pasco, and Pinellas counties, minor erosion occurred from Clearwater Beach to Cedar Key, while immediate beachfront roads from Pinellas County to Hernando County reported coastal flooding. The storm caused one injury in Hillsborough County after winds toppled a tree onto a home in Lutz. Erin severely damaged the roofs of two apartment complexes in Pasco County, leaving a total of 75 people homeless. In Hernando County, about 6,000 people lost electricity, many for at least 24 hours. A mobile home just north of Brooksville was destroyed after a tree fell on it. Winds in Citrus County downed a number of power lines, leaving close to 5,000 residents without electricity. The Inverness city hall suffered minor roof damage, while a mobile home in Floral City was deroofed.

Storm surge and abnormally high tides in Bay and Franklin counties caused some erosion and damage to coastal roads. Inland, winds caused minor damage to roofs and signs, with four homes impacted in Bay County. The hurricane caused minor to moderate damage to approximately 500 structures, including 22 homes, in southern Walton County, with lesser impact farther inland. Hurricane force-winds lashed the Florida Panhandle's westernmost counties – Escambia, Okaloosa, and Santa Rosa – including sustained winds up to 81 mph (130 km/h) at Hurlburt Field near Mary Esther and a wind gust up to 101 mph (163 km/h) at Naval Air Station Pensacola. The tower of Pensacola International Airport was evacuated due to high winds, and the data at that location is therefore unavailable. Erin damaged more than 2,000 homes in the three counties. There was a large amount of crop losses in Northwest Florida resulting from Erin. This included close to half of the cotton crop of the region and around 20 to 25 percent of the pecan crop. An estimated amount of 63 percent of power customers in Northwest Florida lost electricity during the hurricane. Erin spawned two tornadoes in Okaloosa County, both rated F0. The first tornado touched down at Hurlburt Field, downing several trees. The tornado, along with other wind impacts during the storm, inflicted approximately $3 million to $5 million to the facility. Less than an hour after the previous tornado lifted, the next twister touched down in Mary Esther, toppling many trees. Nearby, Eglin Air Force Base suffered roughly $2.5 million in damage, mostly to roofs and trees. At Okaloosa Island, storm tides washed away 50 ft (15 m) of the fishing pier, while winds severely damaged the roof of a hotel and shattered 18 glass wall panes at its dining area. A total of 594 residences in Okaloosa County suffered damage as a result of the cyclone.

In Santa Rosa County, the storm left Navarre Beach particularly hard hit, where nearly one-third of the buildings suffered major damage, including the destruction of four condominiums under construction. The volunteer firefighter building also lost a portion of its roof and suffered water damage. A tornado, rated F0, damaged one home in the community. Winds toppled roughly 40% of trees at the Gulf Breeze Zoo, though no animals suffered injuries. Many trees also fell onto U.S. Route 98 at the Naval Live Oaks Reservation near Gulf Breeze. Farther inland, heavy damage and extensive power outages occurred in Bagdad and Milton after falling trees struck buildings and power lines. Hundreds of trees fell onto power lines at Milton High School. Two planes overturned at Peter Prince Field, but neither suffered extensive damage. In Pace, more than 15 homes in one neighborhood sustained damage due to falling pine trees. Winds destroyed a restaurant after toppling its entire western wall. The gymnasium at Pace High School lost a large section of its roof and suffered water damage after rain entered the building. Throughout the county, the storm inflicted some degree of damage upon 448 homes.

Escambia County experienced the worst impacts from Erin. The storm spawned one tornado in the county, an F0 twister that damaged a home in Pensacola Beach. Additionally, a waterspout inflicted between $25,000 and $30,000 in damage to boats at a marina along Pensacola Bay. Impacts of Erin severely damaged 38 dwellings and destroyed 9 others in Pensacola Beach. Some buildings at the Fort Pickens area of the Gulf Islands National Seashore suffered minor roof damage. Several piers along the bayside of Pensacola Beach sustained partial destruction. At the Port of Pensacola, peeled back the roof from a loading dock warehouse and mangled a sprinkler system, leaving more than $200,000 in damage at the deep-water port. The three campuses of Pensacola State College (then Pensacola Junior College) collectively experienced about $100,000 in damage. The University of West Florida reported damage to windows and roofs, which caused water damage after rains entered the building. Additionally, winds downed over 300 trees. Extensive roof and water damage occurred inside the Pensacola Civic Center. Out of 68 traffic lights in the city, 60 suffered damage. Sections of the Naval Air Station Pensacola lost electricity, but little impact occurred otherwise except at the Naval Air Technical Training Command (NATTC). The NATTC buildings suffered at least hundreds of thousands in damage, primarily due to water intrusion and broken windows. At the Ferguson Airport, winds destroyed a hangar, damaging several airplanes. Preliminary damage estimates at the airport approached $400,000. Erin destroyed 40 homes in Pensacola and damaged 93 others. The hurricane also damaged 416 homes in unincorporated areas of Escambia County and the town of Century. Damage to Escambia County schools totaled approximately $13 million, with $8.5 million to Workman Middle School alone. A total of 2,268 homes were damaged to some extent in Escambia County, with 547 suffering major impact and 49 other experiencing destruction.

=== Elsewhere ===
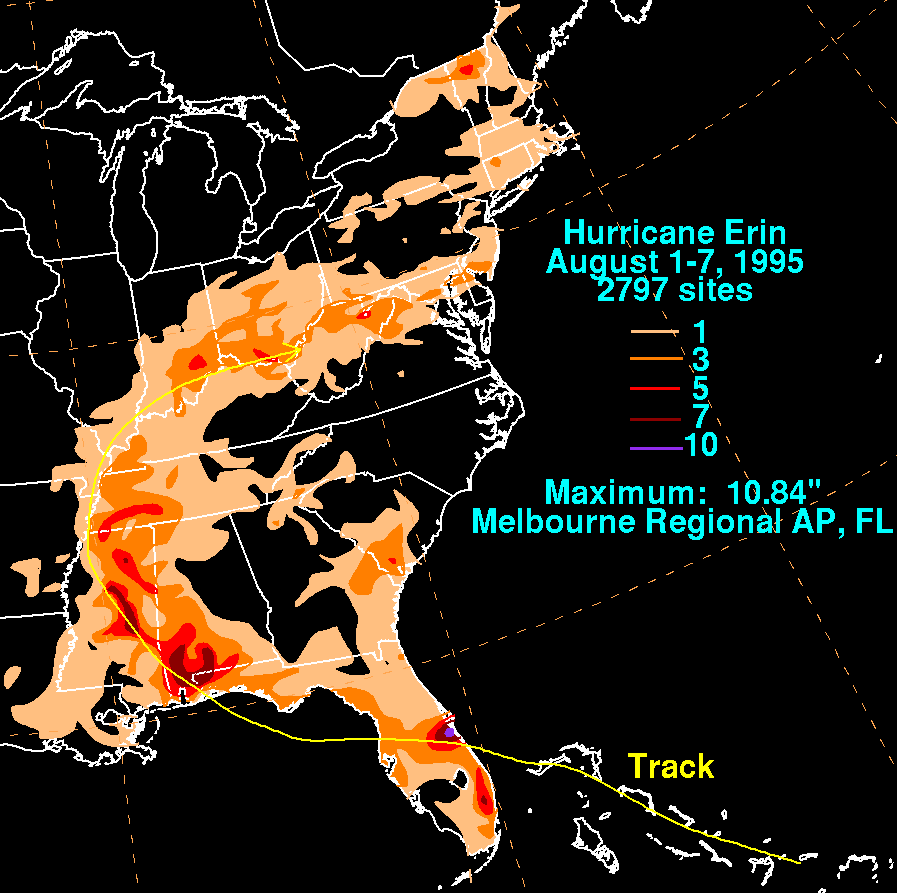
Total rainfall from Erin

After making landfall in the Florida Panhandle, the storm soon entered Alabama, bringing sustained wind speeds up to 37 mph (60 km/h) and gusts as high as 50 mph (80 km/h), both recorded in Fairhope. However, winds gusts were estimated to have reached as strong as 100 mph (160 km/h) at the Atmore Municipal Airport. Tropical storm force winds in the southwestern Alabama, including the Mobile metropolitan area, downed trees and power lines. Pecan crops in Baldwin County experienced a loss of 50 to 75 percent of the total crop. Seventeen schools in the county suffered damage, including one in which 10 classrooms flooded after the building was partially deroofed. In Central Alabama, rains from Erin doused some wildfires, but provided little additional relief for the drought-stricken region. Strong winds downed several trees in Barbour County, one of which fell onto a home. The storm left approximately 37,400 customers of Alabama Power without electricity. Erin caused approximately $40 million in damage in Alabama.

In Mississippi, the storm may have produced wind gusts as high as 60 mph (97 km/h) in Waynesboro. Wind downed numerous trees and power lines in Greene, Perry, and Wayne counties. Some homes along U.S. Route 45 and in Buckatunna and Waynesboro suffered damage, primarily by falling trees on them or shingles being stripped from the roofs. Approximately one-third of Clarke County experienced power outages. In the same county, winds ripped a porch of a home, toppled a tree onto another home, and deroofed another home. Erin caused approximately $10 million in damage in Mississippi.

The cyclone caused minimal damage in Georgia. Some beach erosion was reported near the Georgia–Florida state line. In Kentucky, the remnants of Erin provided mostly beneficial rainfall to the drought-stricken state, with the northeastern portions of the state generally recording 2.5 to 4 in (64 to 102 mm) of precipitation. Approximately 2 to 4 in (51 to 102 mm) of precipitation fell in portions of West Virginia, causing the Middle Island Creek to overflow, but little damage occurred as rainfall was beneficial otherwise. Farther north, ex-Erin caused flash flooding in southern Indiana, especially in Fayette and Ripley counties. The latter observed 4 in (100 mm) of precipitation in about eight hours, causing the Laughery Creek to overflow and flooding roads and low-lying areas. In Indianapolis, remnants of Erin caused a lengthy rain delay at the Brickyard 400. In Ohio, the remnants of Erin caused flash flooding after bringing additional rainfall to areas already saturated due to heavy precipitation thunderstorms in the previous few days. The flash flooding hit Holmes County particularly hard, inundating basements, low-lying areas, streets, and small streams. Among the roads included County Roads 179, 186, and 245. Flooding also resulted in the closure of State Route 97 in Morrow County. Farther south, similar flooding occurred in Franklink County, where State Route 104 closed due to inundation.

== Aftermath ==
Florida governor Lawton Chiles, along with Federal Emergency Management Agency (FEMA) director James Lee Witt, Congressman Joe Scarborough, and State Representative W. D. Childers, toured damage in the western Florida Panhandle on August 4. Governor Chiles then requested a disaster declaration, approved by President Bill Clinton for Bay, Brevard, Escambia, Okaloosa, Santa Rosa, and Walton counties. However, as more damage assessments became available, a total of 24 counties eventually became eligible for some form of assistance from the federal government. The Small Business Administration (SBA) also made loans available to those who owned homes and businesses or rent properties in those six counties. By August 24, exactly three weeks after the storm made landfall in the Pensacola area, the Federal Emergency Management Agency (FEMA) had approved over 5,000 applications for aid, including 2,429 from Escambia County and 1,367 from Santa Rosa County. The agency also paid out $623,618 for temporary housing and $257,000 for personal property losses and repairs to homes by that date. An aid package created by the Florida Legislature and approved by Governor Chiles on August 25 expended $8.8 million to the 20 hardest-hit counties to supplement federal disaster assistance. Overall, FEMA provided over $40 million in aid, including $23.1 million for repairing or replacing public properties and infrastructure, $12.7 million to SBA loans, $4.8 million for hazard mitigation programs, $2.7 million for temporary housing, and $1.4 million in family grants.

Many of the hardest-hit areas of the Florida Panhandle also experienced some of the worst impacts from Hurricane Opal about two months later. Likely as a result of Erin, a majority of coastal residents evacuated as Opal approached landfall. However, Opal caused much more damage, totaling approximately $5.1 billion.

Alabama governor Fob James personally assessed damage in Baldwin and Escambia counties. Describing the damage, James noted, "for a hurricane it was minimal" and also remarked that impact was far less than that of Hurricane Frederic in 1979. Four teams from the Federal Emergency Management Agency surveyed damage in Baldwin, Escambia, and Washington counties. They also failed to find any major damage from Erin. Ultimately, no disaster declaration would be approved for Alabama.

== See also ==
- Other storms of the same name
- Timeline of the 1995 Atlantic hurricane season
- List of Category 2 Atlantic hurricanes
- List of Florida hurricanes (1975–1999)
- List of North Carolina hurricanes (1980–1999)
- Hurricane Sally (2020)
- Hurricane Nicole (2022)
