= Pensacola Beach Water Tower =

Water tower in Pensacola Beach, Florida

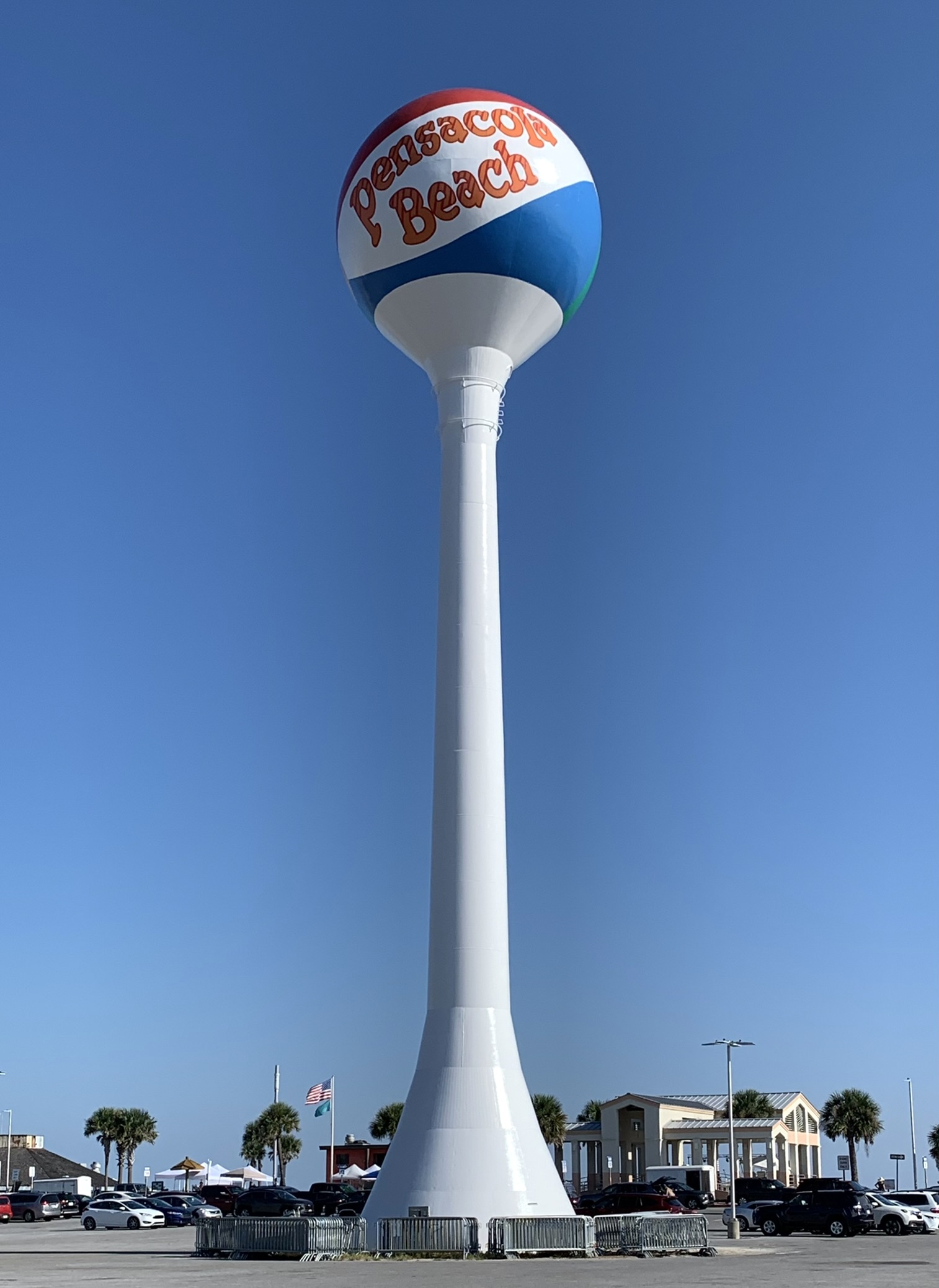
- Pensacola Beach Water Tower in 2022
- Interactive map of the Pensacola Beach Water Tower area

General information
- Location: Pensacola Beach, Florida
- Coordinates: 30°19′56″N 87°8′28″W
- Completed: 2005

The Pensacola Beach Water Tower is a domestic water tower located in Pensacola Beach, Florida, United States. The water tower is an iconic symbol of Pensacola. It was run by Emerald Coast Utilities Authority (ECUA) from 2005 to 2007 until it was sold to The Island Authority. Today the water tower is not in use but still is a city treasure.

== History ==
There were two of the same water towers at one point but were located at the different ends of the beach. The water towers were owned by ECUA at one point. In 2006 the second water tower was demolished because of the fee for maintenance. Along with the second water tower the first water tower was also supposed to be demolished but it was voted to stay. So today there is only one of the water towers standing still. In 2007 the tower was sold to The Island Authority from ECUA. In 2012 the water tower was repainted.

== See also ==
- Pensacola
- Pensacola Beach, Florida
