= Florida State Road 399 =

Highway in Florida, United States

State Road 399 and County Road 399
- SR 399 in red, CR 399 in blue

Route information
- Maintained by FDOT, Escambia County, and Santa Rosa County
- Length: 22.7 mi (36.5 km)

Major junctions
- South end: US 98 in Navarre
- North end: US 98 in Gulf Breeze

Location
- Country: United States
- State: Florida
- County: Escambia

Highway system
- Florida State Highway System; Interstate; US; State; Former; Pre‑1945; Toll; Scenic
← SR 397	→ SR 400

State Road 399 (SR 399) is a state road in Santa Rosa County, Florida. The road was originally constructed as a 22.7-mile (36.5 km) road, largely located in the median of Santa Rosa Island. The designation also included the Bob Sikes Bridge on the western end and the Navarre Beach Causeway on the eastern end, which made the road a loop of US 98 on the Fairpoint Peninsula.

Only a small 0.32-mile (0.51 km) portion of the road, which connects US 98 to the Bob Sikes Bridge, remains under state control; the remaining portion is now administered by Escambia and Santa Rosa Counties, both under the designation County Road 399 (CR 399). Santa Rosa County also uses the CR 399 designation for two other unrelated roads: East Bay Boulevard in Navarre and Country Mill Road near Jay.

== Route description ==
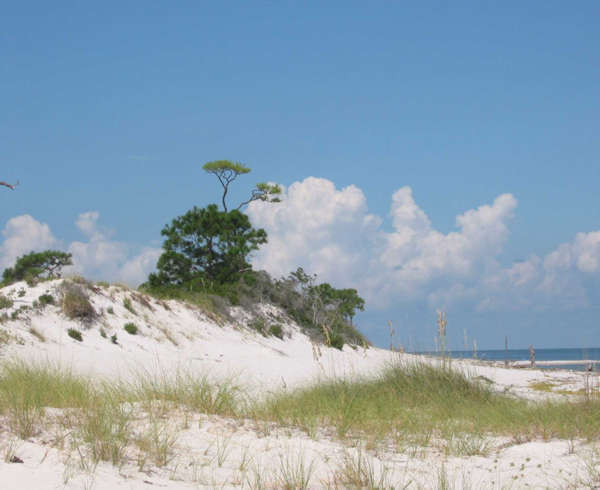
A photograph of Gulf Islands National Seashore off CR 399; notice the longleaf pines on the left side of the picture touch the sand dunes

Beginning at a trumpet interchange with US 98–SR 30 in Gulf Breeze, SR 399 heads south to the end of state maintenance at the gore of the interchange. CR 399 continues south over the Bob Sikes Bridge, which crosses Santa Rosa Sound from the mainland to Santa Rosa Island. It then curves east at Pensacola Beach and heads east along the barrier island through the Gulf Islands National Seashore to Navarre Beach, where CR 399 turns north and crosses the Navarre Bridge back to the mainland. The Navarre Bridge was a toll bridge with one cash and one SunPass lane for southbound traffic until 2005 but it is now toll-free.

== Major intersections ==
County	Location	mi	km	Destinations	Notes
Santa Rosa	Gulf Breeze	0.000	0.000	US 98 (SR 30) to I-10 / SR 281 (Garcon Point Bridge) – Gulf Islands National Seashore	interchange
Santa Rosa	Gulf Breeze	0.319	0.513	south end of state maintenance	
Santa Rosa Sound		0.6– 1.3	0.97– 2.1	Bob Sikes Bridge	
Escambia	Pensacola Beach	1.5	2.4	toll plaza (southbound only)	
Escambia	Pensacola Beach	2.2	3.5	Fort Pickens Road	to Fort Pickens
Santa Rosa	Navarre Beach	19.3	31.1	Navarre Beach Park	
Santa Rosa		20.1– 20.6	32.3– 33.2	Navarre Bridge over Santa Rosa Sound	
Santa Rosa	Navarre	20.7	33.3	US 98 (SR 30) to I-10 / SR 281 (Garcon Point Bridge) / SR 87 – Gulf Breeze, Fort Walton Beach	
1.000 mi = 1.609 km; 1.000 km = 0.621 mi
