= Santa Rosa Sound =

Body of water in Florida, United States

Coordinates: 30.4019171°N 86.7768273°W

Santa Rosa Sound is a sound connecting Pensacola Bay and Choctawhatchee Bay in Florida. The northern shore consists of the Fairpoint Peninsula and portions of the mainland in Santa Rosa County and Okaloosa County. It is bounded to the south by Santa Rosa Island (also known as Okaloosa Island in the easternmost region of the sound), separating it from the Gulf of Mexico.

The Gulf Intracoastal Waterway between Pensacola Beach and Fort Walton Beach is routed through the sound.

== Communities located along Santa Rosa Sound ==
- Gulf Breeze, Florida
- Pensacola Beach, Florida
- Navarre, Florida
- Navarre Beach, Florida
- Mary Esther, Florida
- Fort Walton Beach, Florida

== Bridges crossing Santa Rosa Sound ==
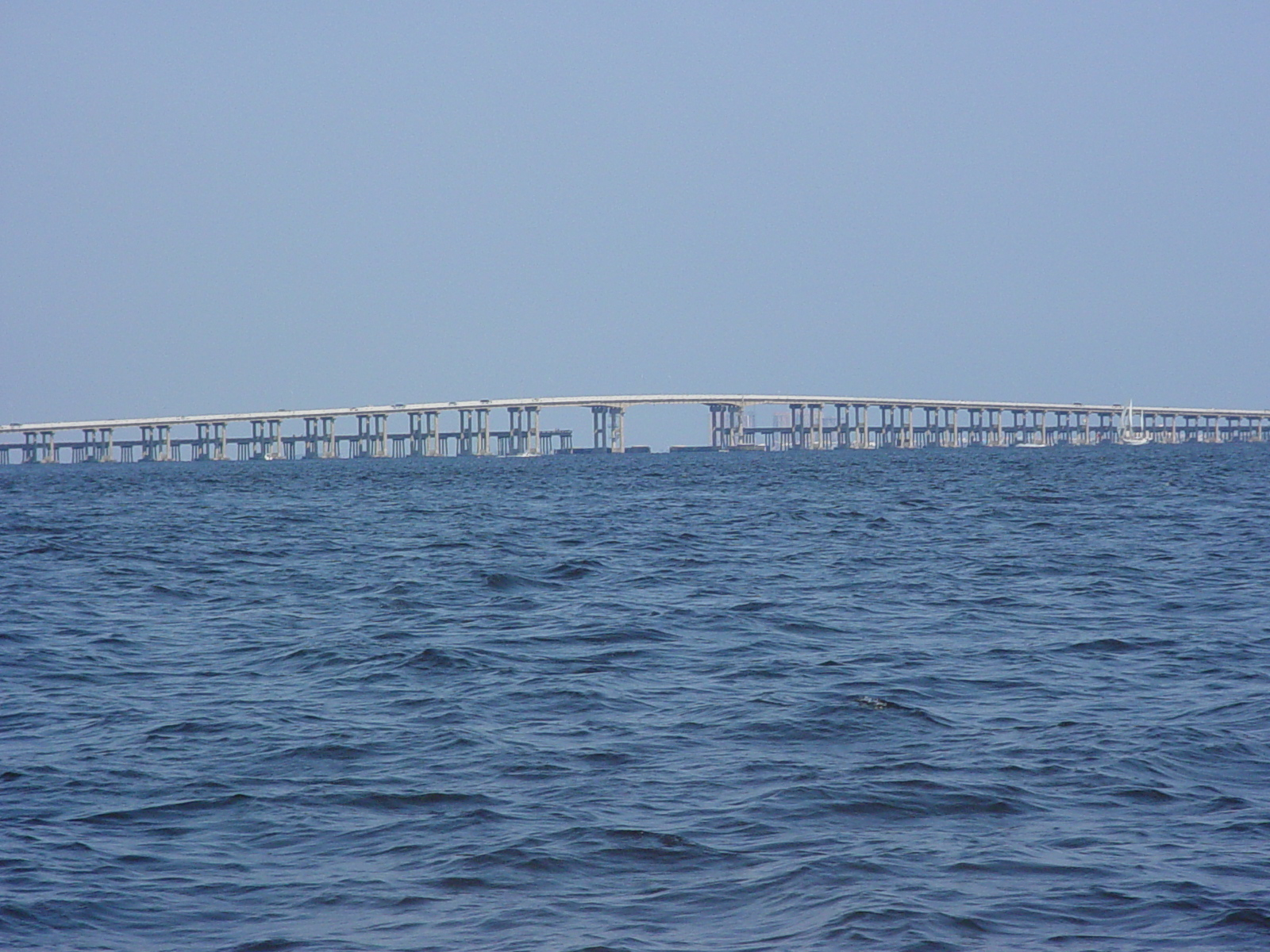
Pensacola Beach Bridge.

Three bridges carry pedestrian and automobile traffic to the barrier islands on the south side of the sound. The first two bridges have the lowest clearance of any span over the Gulf Intracoastal Waterway. For this reason, many sailboats with masts taller than 50 feet must "go outside" and bypass the protected sound using the unprotected waters of the Gulf of Mexico.

From west to east, the bridges crossing Santa Rosa Sound, including the names of communities on both sides of the bridge (mainland side, followed by island side) and center span clearances above mean sea level, are:

- Bob Sikes Bridge (CR 399, commonly the "Pensacola Beach Bridge"): Gulf Breeze to Pensacola Beach (65 feet clearance)
- Navarre Beach Causeway (CR 399): Navarre to Navarre Beach (55 feet clearance)
- Brooks Bridge (US 98): Fort Walton Beach to Okaloosa Island (50 feet clearance)

== See also ==
- Pensacola Bay
- Choctawhatchee Bay
- Sound (geography)
