= Operation Sandshaker =

Operation Sandshaker was a three-year investigation, between 2000 and 2003 in Pensacola, Florida that resulted in the arrest of more than thirty residents, many of them respected individuals within the community. The individuals were suspected in trafficking cocaine from Miami into the Pensacola area. The cocaine ring was centered on a small bar, the Sandshaker, on the island town of Pensacola Beach.

The arrested included a millionaire, a middle school teacher, and a substance abuse counselor.

== Location ==
The Sandshaker Lounge, Package Store and Sandwich Shop, located in Pensacola Beach, Florida, consisted of two small bars and lounge area totaling approximately 1,978 square feet (183.8 m^{2}). The total lot size is .54 acres (2,200 m^{2}). The bar opened in 1977.

== Auction and reopening ==
The business operation was closed on September 16, 2004, due to Hurricane Ivan. Bidding for the Sandshaker Lounge, Package Store and Sandwich Shop was conducted on an online auction site.
