= RegionAir =

Gabonese airline

- Founded: 2007
- Hubs: Port-Gentil International Airport
- Fleet size: 1
- Destinations: 3
- Headquarters: Libreville, Gabon
- Website: regionair.aero

RegionAir is an airline headquartered in port-Gentil, Gabon. It focus on regional flights in Central and West Africa. RegionAir works strictly as a charter airline to companies in the oil & gas industry and does not sell tickets to the general public.
