= Bob Sikes Bridge =

Toll bridge in Escambia County, Florida

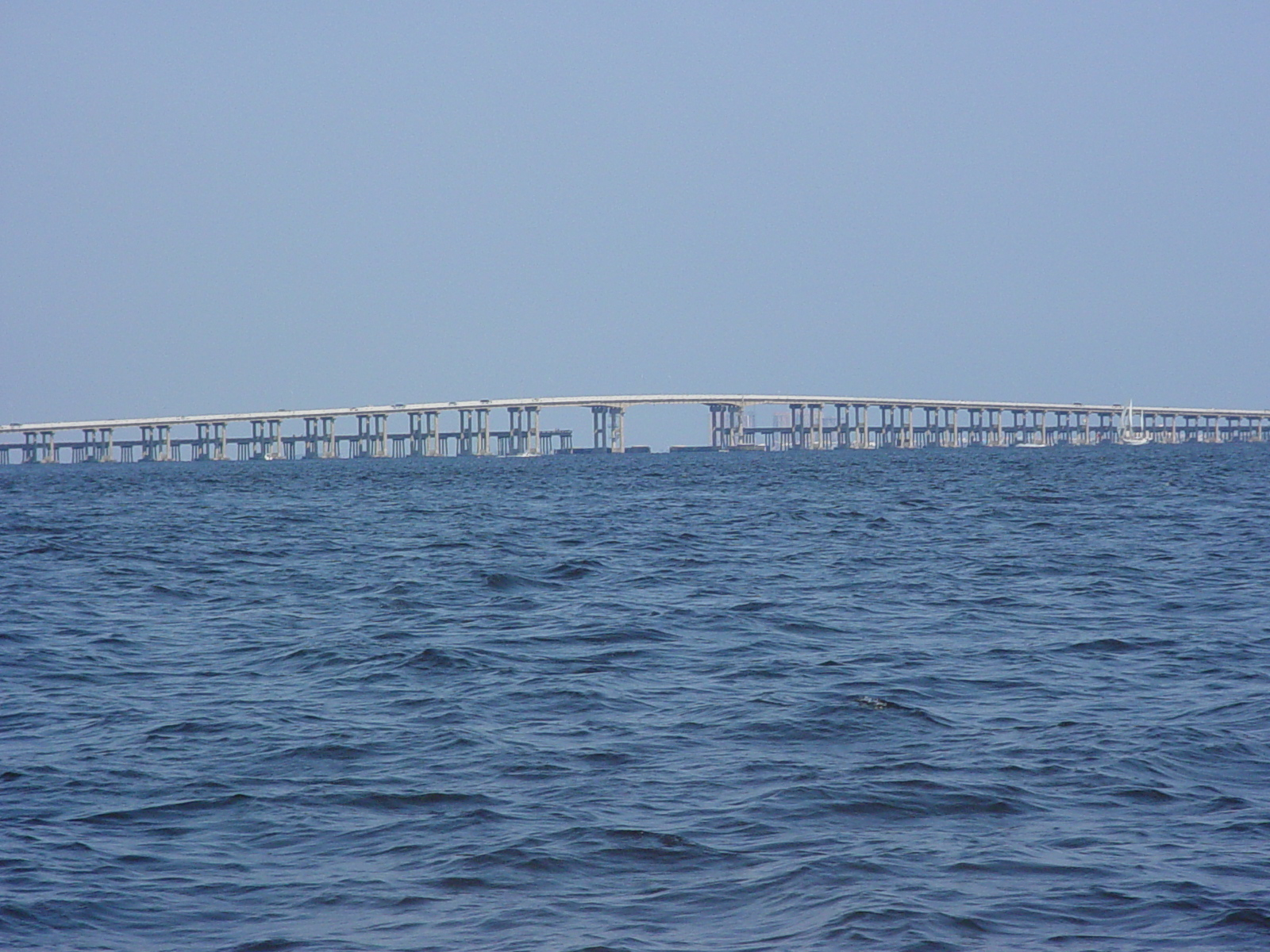
- Bob Sikes Bridge viewed from Naval Live Oaks Reservation
- Coordinates: 30.34815°N 87.15357°W
- Carries: 4 lanes of CR 399 (Pensacola Beach Boulevard)
- Crosses: Santa Rosa Sound
- Locale: Escambia County, Florida
- ID number: 480123
- Website: myescambia.com/pensacola-beach/waystothebeach

Characteristics
- Design: Girder
- Material: Prestressed concrete
- Total length: 3,645 feet (1,111 meters)
- Width: 33 feet (10 meters)
- No. of spans: 47
- Clearance below: 64.9 feet (19.8 meters)

History
- Opened: 1974; 52 years ago

Statistics
- Daily traffic: 27,500 (2022)
- Toll: $1.00

Location
- Interactive map of Bob Sikes Bridge

Bob Sikes Bridge (formally Robert L. F. Sikes Bridge and also known as Pensacola Beach Bridge) is a four-lane bridge in Escambia County, Florida. The bridge carries Pensacola Beach Boulevard (County Road 399) north–south across the Santa Rosa Sound, connecting Gulf Breeze on the Fairpoint Peninsula to Pensacola Beach on Santa Rosa Island. The bridge is named for former U.S. Representative Bob Sikes.

As of 2019, the bridge carries around 26,000 cars per day, for a total of around 9.4 million per year.

== Tolls ==
Southbound traffic on the bridge is tolled at a toll plaza south of the bridge. Northbound traffic is not tolled. As of May 2026, the bridge toll is $1 and is payable via toll-by-plate or a SunPass-compatible transponder. Annual passes are available at a cost of $5 for Pensacola Beach residents, $20 for the general public, or $70 for commercial vehicles.

Toll revenue is used to pay for repairs to the bridge and improvements to Pensacola Beach infrastructure. Revenue from the tolls generates around $3.1 million a year, making up roughly 1% of Escambia County's annual revenue.

== History ==
Bob Sikes Bridge was constructed in 1974 as a replacement for an older two-lane bridge. The original bridge was closed to through traffic and repurposed into a fishing pier.

In 2002, the Escambia County Commission earmarked toll revenue from the bridge to pay for a widening of Via de Luna Drive, Pensacola Beach's main thoroughfare, through 2031.

In 2017, Escambia County approved a $4 million project to extend the bridge's lifespan, originally set to end in 2024, by twelve years to 2036. The extension would allow a planned replacement bridge to be built using toll revenue, which cannot be done until bonds for the Via de Luna project are paid off in 2031. Construction for the project began in 2020.

In Spring 2020, cash payments at the bridge were discontinued in favor of toll-by-plate.

In September 2020, Hurricane Sally caused erosion damage to the bridge's southbound span. The span was closed to non-residents for three weeks.

In 2025, Escambia County announced plans to demolish and replace the bridge's toll plaza. Construction began in January 2026 and is scheduled to be completed in the summer.
