= Okaloosa Island, Florida =

Coordinates: 30.3971°N 86.6002°W

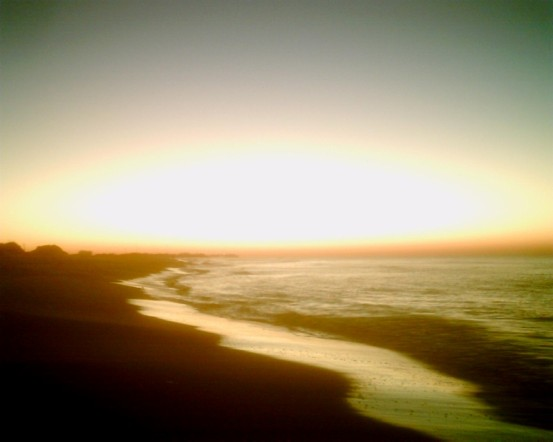
- Interactive map of Okaloosa Island, Florida

Okaloosa Island is an area on Santa Rosa Island, Florida, United States.

An 875-acre (354 ha) parcel of Santa Rosa Island with 3 miles (4.8 km) of Gulf frontage was conveyed to Okaloosa County on July 8, 1950, in an informal ceremony at the county courthouse in Crestview. The county paid the federal government $4,000 to complete the transaction, which was the result of the efforts of Congressman Bob Sikes. This area had been known as Tower Beach with the establishment of an amusement park, boardwalk and hotel from the mid-1930s. Tower Beach, with a board walk, casino, restaurant and concession stands, and operated by Thomas E. Brooks, of the same family for whom the Brooks Bridge is named, was largely destroyed by fire on Saturday, March 7, 1942. Wartime priorities precluded its reconstruction.

The last of three county-owned buildings on Okaloosa Island was torn down on May 31, 1995. The buildings had originally housed the Okaloosa Island Authority and more recently the Okaloosa County Council on Aging. The 1.3-acre (0.53 ha) tract on the north side of Santa Rosa Boulevard was sold.
