= Pensacola Beach, Florida =

Unincorporated community in Florida, United States

- Unincorporated Community
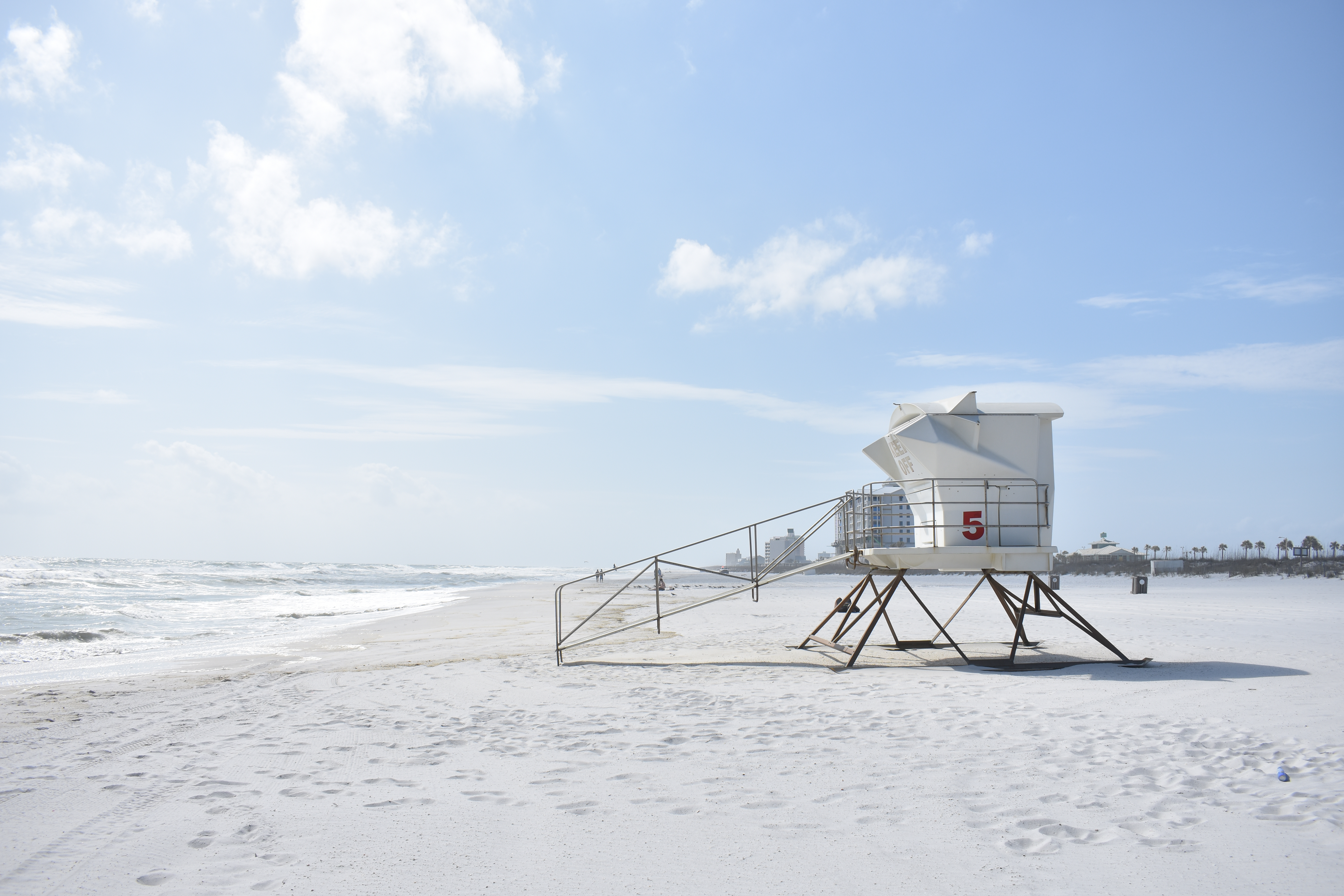
- A lifeguard stand on Pensacola Beach

- Location within Florida
- Coordinates: 30°19′56″N 87°8′30″W
- Country: United States
- States: Florida
- County: Escambia
- Founder: Tristan de Luna

Area
  - Total: 29.943 km^{2} (11.561 sq mi)
  - Land: 29.660 km^{2} (11.452 sq mi)
  - Water: 0.283 km^{2} (0.109 sq mi)
- Time zone: UTC-6 (CST)
  - Summer (DST): UTC-5 (CDT)
- ZIP code: 32561
- Area code: 850

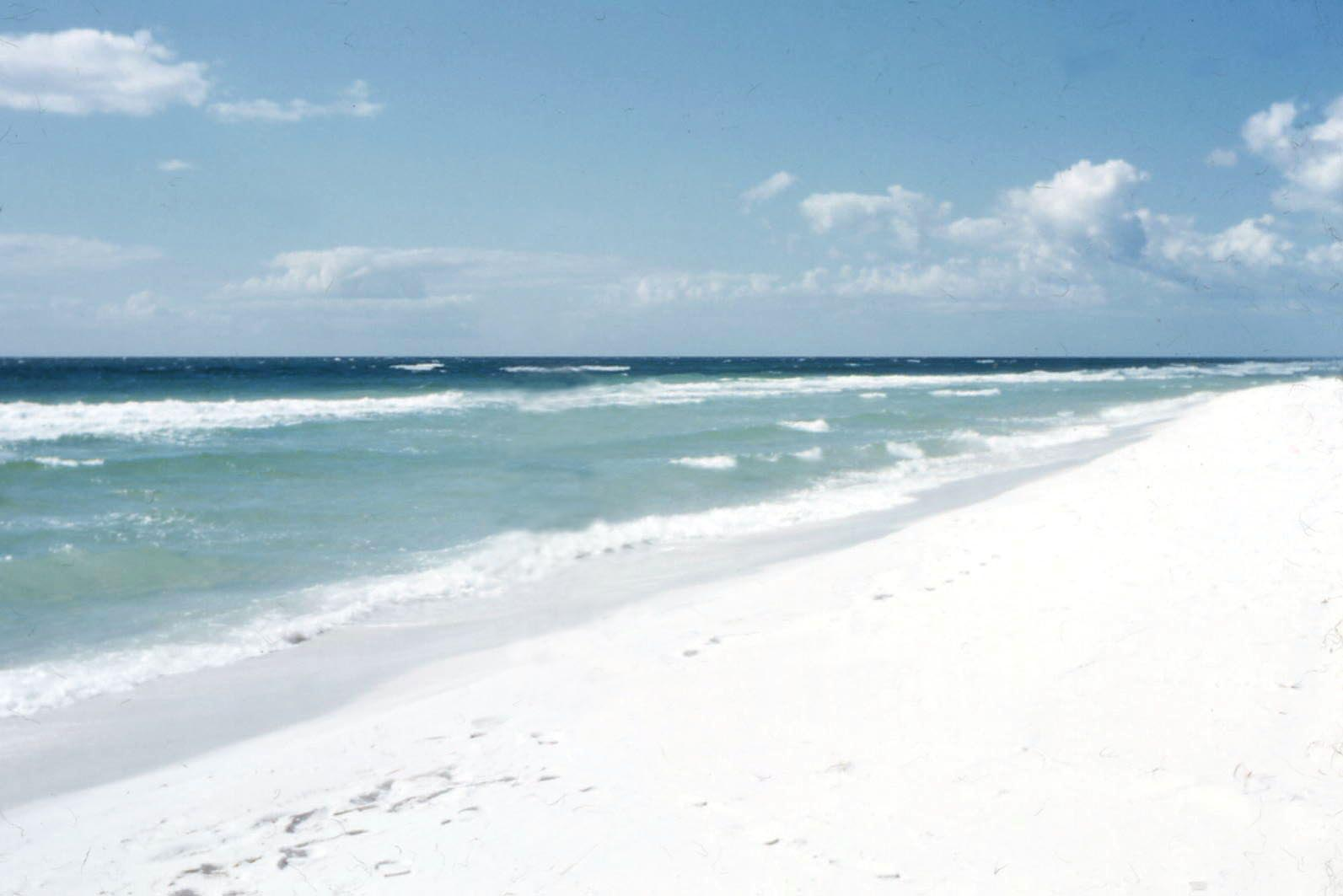
The sand color is exceptionally white as seen in this 1957 photo

Pensacola Beach is an unincorporated community located on Santa Rosa Island, a barrier island, in Escambia County, Florida, United States. It is situated south of Pensacola (and Gulf Breeze connected via bridges spanning to the Fairpoint Peninsula and then to the island) in the Gulf of Mexico. As of the 2000 census, the community had a total population of 2,738. It has been described as "famous" for its ultra-white sand beaches.

Pensacola Beach occupies land bound by a 1947 deed from the United States Department of Interior that it be administered in the public interest by the county or leased, but never "disposed"; its businesses and residents are thus long-term leaseholders and not property owners.

Pensacola Beach is part of the Pensacola–Ferry Pass–Brent Metropolitan Statistical Area, which includes all of Escambia and Santa Rosa counties.

== History ==
Francisco Maldonado, a lieutenant under Conquistador Hernando de Soto, visited the area during the early Spanish exploration of North America. He anchored in Pensacola Bay for the winter of 1539–1540.

In 1559, Don Tristan de Luna y Arellano led the first settlement of the region. His 11 ships, with 1500 settlers, anchored in the bay and established a colony on the site of today's Naval Air Station Pensacola. Shortly after their arrival, on August 15, 1559, Friar Dominic de la Anunciacion conducted what is believed to be the first Christian religious service in the present-day United States. This event is commemorated by a marker near the possible site of the service, indicating the historical significance of the location as a place of early religious and cultural exchange.

A hurricane decimated the colony a few weeks later, killing hundreds and sinking five of the 11 ships. Suffering long-term famine and fighting, this first settlement was finally abandoned in 1561. A presidio was constructed on Santa Rosa Island in 1722 near the location of the more recent Fort Pickens. Hurricanes in 1741 and 1752 forced its relocation to the mainland.

Pensacola Beach remained largely undeveloped for many years. The Casino Resort was the first tourist destination constructed on the island (at the present day location of Casino Beach) where a variety of special events including beauty pageants, fishing tournaments, and boxing matches were held from the 1930s through 1950s. With a bar, tennis courts, bath houses, and a restaurant, it was a popular resort until it eventually closed in the 1960s.

The entire island was initially owned by the federal government. In order to promote infrastructure and growth on the island, the federal government leased the lands now encompassing Pensacola Beach to the Santa Rosa Island Authority (SRIA), which in turn has leased the property to homeowners. As a result, all structures on the island have 99-year renewable leases with the SRIA rather than ownership of the land itself.

== Geography ==
Pensacola Beach is located at 30°20′00″N 87°08′15″W, on the barrier island of Santa Rosa. It is bordered to the south by the Gulf of Mexico, to the north by Santa Rosa Sound and Pensacola Bay, and to the east and west by the Gulf Islands National Seashore.

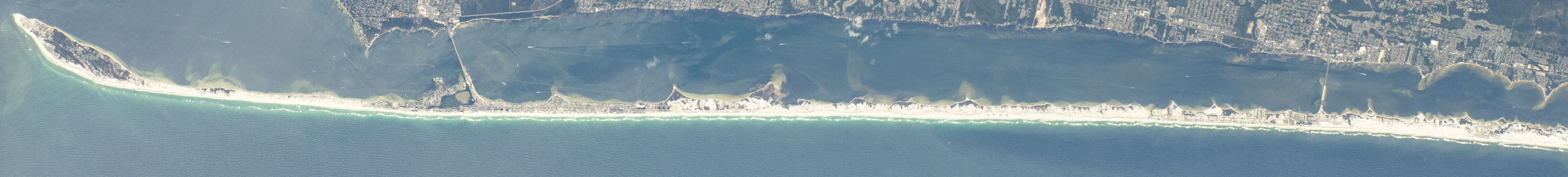
View from ISS Expedition 72, November 2024

== Climate ==
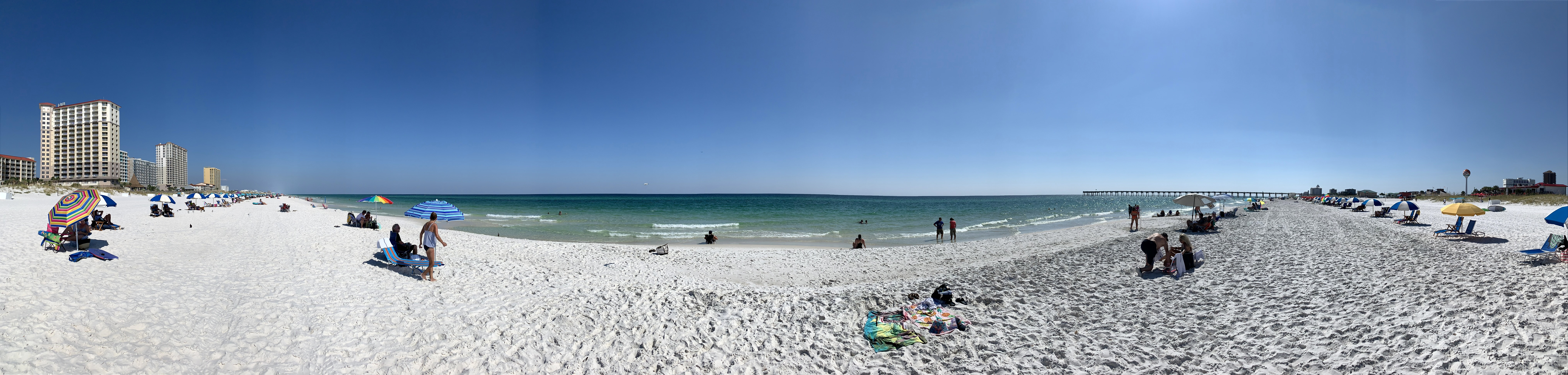
Pensacola Beach in 2022

While generally cooler than most of peninsular Florida, Pensacola Beach maintains a more stable temperature year round than inland areas of Pensacola and Escambia County. As such, winter lows are several degrees warmer than Pensacola proper and summer highs are generally cooler as a result of the surrounding waters.

As with many islands, Pensacola Beach enjoys sea breezes which begin around noon and end around sunset in the summer, and there are often afternoon thunderstorms. The average temperature ranges from 44 °F (7 °C) in January to 89 °F (32 °C) in July.

=== Hurricanes ===
As a community located on a low-lying barrier island, Pensacola Beach is vulnerable to hurricanes. Landfalling storms have been known to drive storm surge over the island, damaging or destroying man-made structures and causing beach erosion. In 1995, two hurricanes made landfall on the island. Hurricane Erin made landfall in August, and Hurricane Opal blasted the island just two months later, leveling some dunes and destroying a number of homes.

On September 16, 2004, Hurricane Ivan devastated the Pensacola Beach area, destroying more than 650 homes and damaging many others. Ivan was the last hurricane to make Florida landfall in 2004, one of the most destructive hurricane seasons in decades.

On July 10, 2005, Hurricane Dennis made landfall between Pensacola Beach and eastern Navarre Beach. However, as with Erin almost a decade earlier, the damage on Pensacola Beach was not nearly as extensive as predicted.

In 2020, Pensacola Beach took the brunt of the storm from Hurricane Sally, seeing widespread wind damage, storm surge flooding, and over 20 inches (510 mm) of rainfall. A section of the Pensacola Bay Bridge (known to locals as the Three Mile Bridge) was destroyed during Hurricane Sally.

The island has been subject to mandatory evacuation orders during some of these hurricanes.

== Oil spill ==
The Deepwater Horizon, a BP-operated oil-drilling rig in the Gulf of Mexico off the Louisiana coast, exploded April 20, 2010, eventually releasing almost 5 million barrels of oil into the Gulf before being capped on August 4, 2010. Oil from the explosion did not reach Pensacola beaches until June 4, 2010. Crews posted along Escambia County's coastline quickly cleaned much of the oil that was evident along the beaches. Tourism in the Pensacola Beach area was adversely affected during the summer of 2010. BBC News reported that swimmers at Pensacola Beach "encountered an oil sheen and children picked up tar blobs as big as tennis balls."

== Public transportation ==
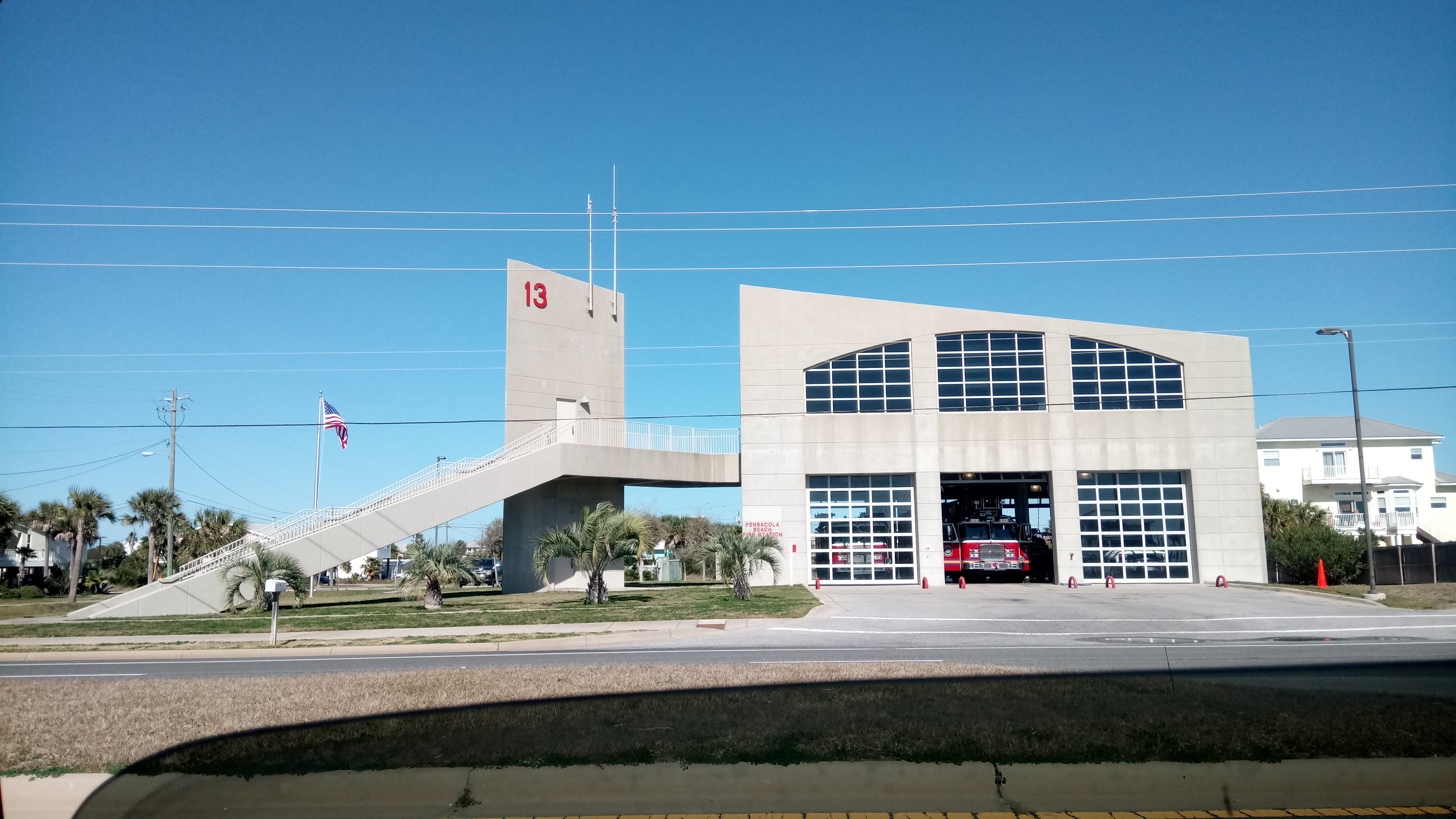
Fire Station #13

Escambia County Area Transit (ECAT) provides bus transportation seven days per week.

== Government and infrastructure ==
Escambia County Fire Rescue operates Fire Station #13 in Pensacola Beach. The Escambia County Sheriff's Office has Precinct 1 covering Pensacola Beach, operated out of the Pensacola Beach Sheriff's Substation.

The primary road entrance to Pensacola Beach is the Bob Sikes Bridge, a 0.7-mile (1.1 km) toll bridge that connects to the city of Gulf Breeze. The bridge is owned by the government of Escambia County, and collected tolls are used to fund improvements to Pensacola Beach infrastructure. As of 2019, the bridge carries around 26,000 cars per day.

== Attractions ==
=== Casino Beach ===
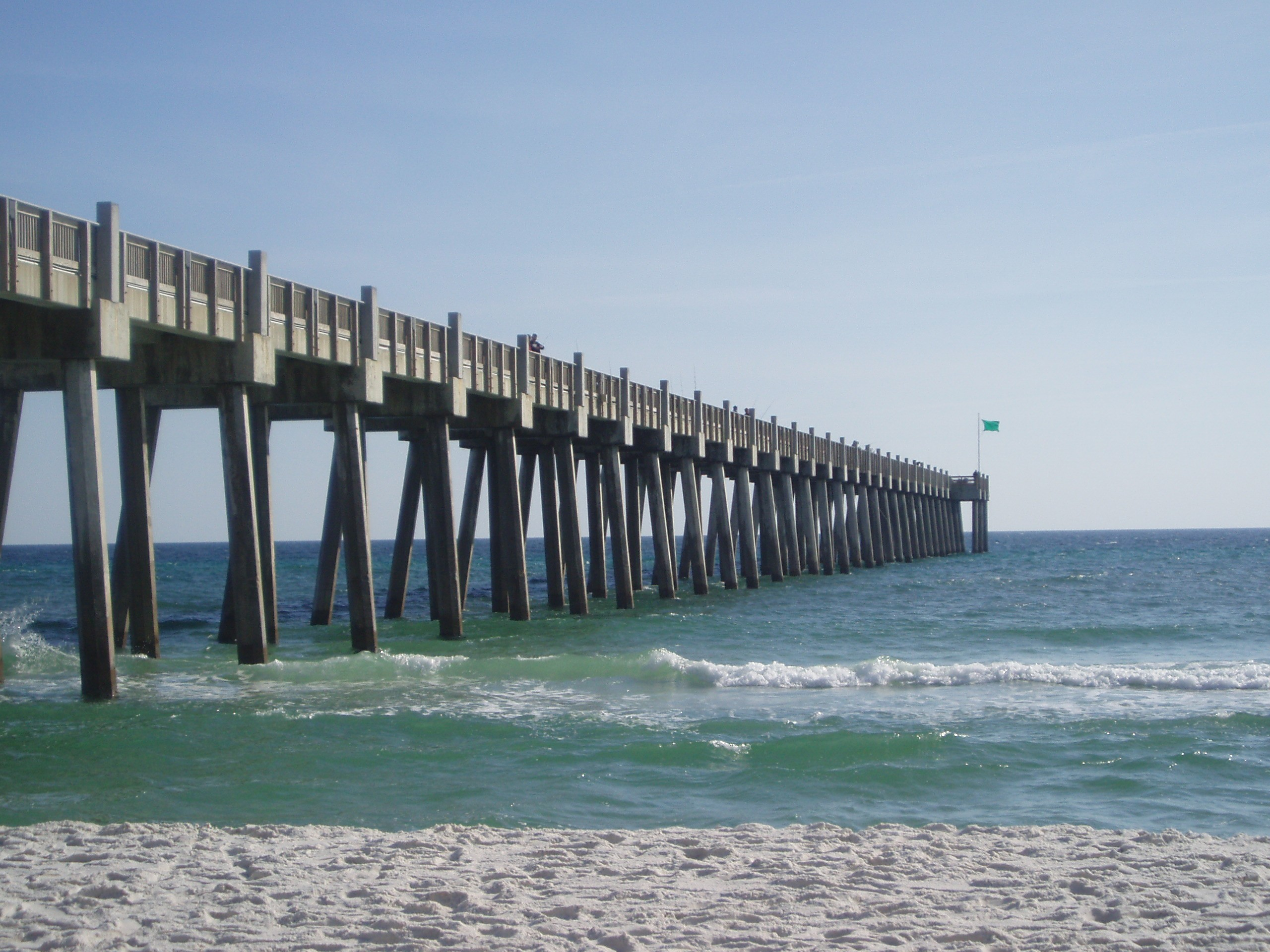
Gulf Pier, located on Pensacola Beach, is 1,471 feet long

The hub of beach activity, Casino Beach, on Pensacola Beach, is named after the original casino that stood in this location and is a popular beach access. The location is dotted with restaurants and family entertainment areas. It is situated next to the Pensacola Beach Gulf Pier, which at 1,471 feet is described as the longest pier on the Gulf of Mexico. The beach is equipped with lifeguard stands and station, volleyball courts, snack bar and large parking lot. The Gulfside Pavilion hosts a "Bands on the Beach" concert series during the summer tourist season.

=== Gulf Pier ===
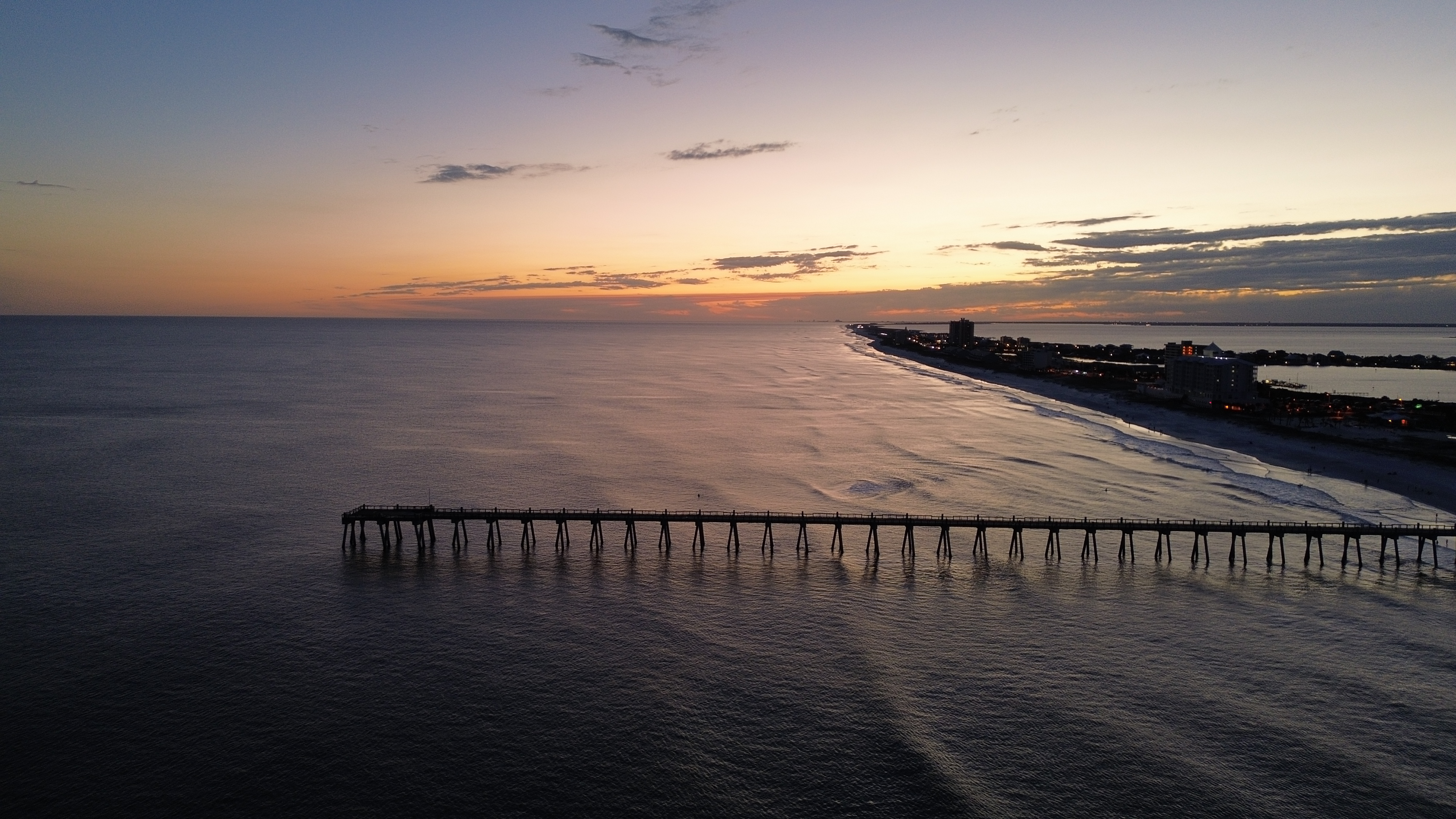
An aerial view of the Gulf Pier, showing how far the pier extends out into the gulf

The Gulf Pier has been called an iconic part of Pensacola Beach by residents. It is maintained by Escambia County Public Works and the Santa Rosa Island Authority. In addition to fishing, the pier offers sightseeing marine wildlife such as dolphins and stingrays. It has been closed and renovated a number of times due to storm and hurricane damage.

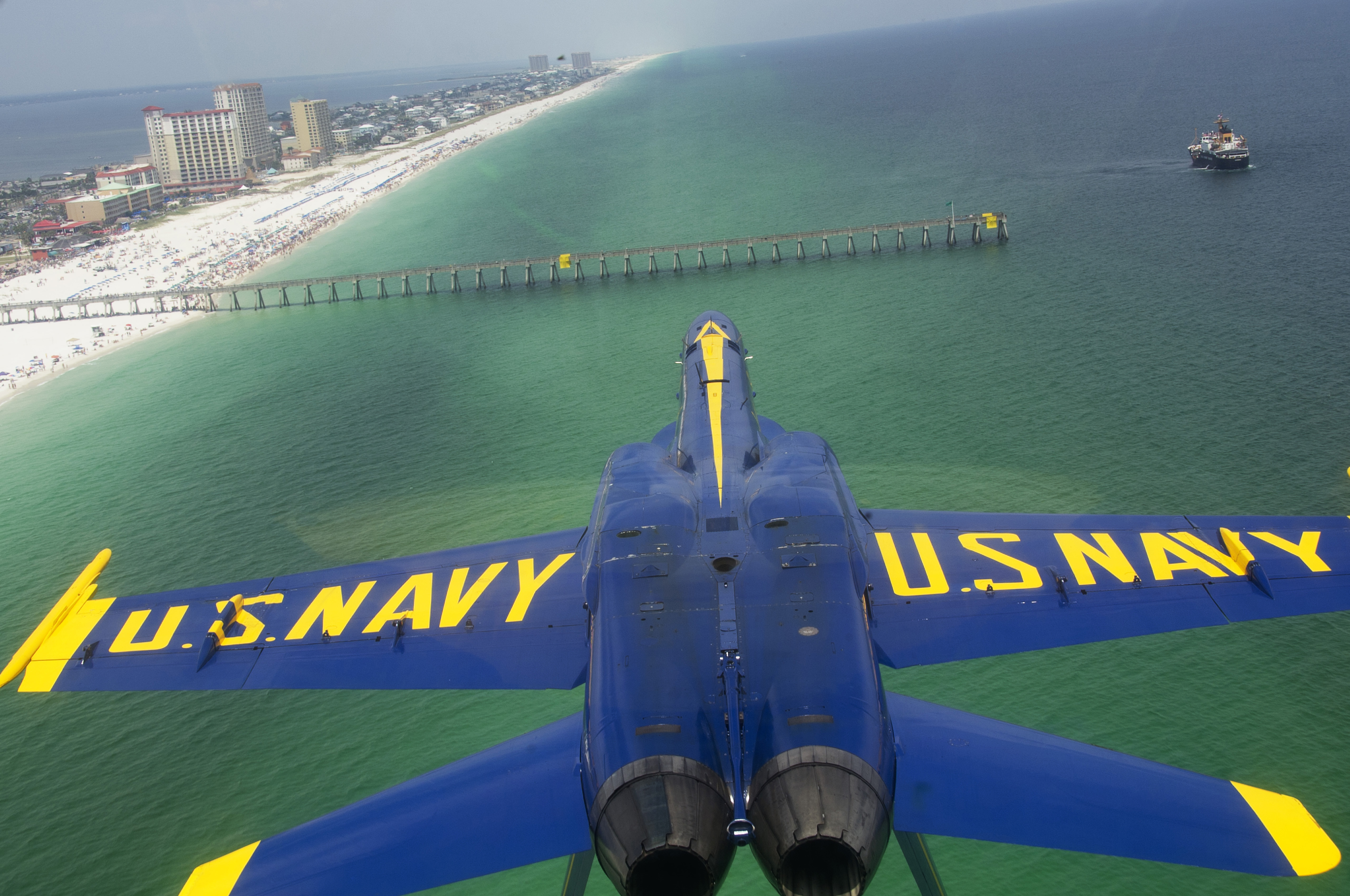
A United States Navy Blue Angels F/A-18 Hornet Fighter Jet flying over Pensacola Beach

=== Blue Angels ===
Pensacola beach is known for flyovers by the Blue Angels demonstration team from the nearby Pensacola Naval Air Station base. An annual air show is held each summer.

=== Quietwater Beach Boardwalk ===
The boardwalk is on the Santa Rosa Sound side of the island, directly across from Casino Beach. Retail shops, restaurants, nightclubs, street musicians and sidewalk artists line it. The boardwalk has a large sea shell stage where concerts are held several times a year.

=== Fort Pickens ===
Located at the western end of Santa Rosa Island, Fort Pickens was completed in 1834 and used until World War II, when modern weapons made traditional coastal defenses obsolete. It is open to the public as part of the Gulf Islands National Seashore, with a fee required for entry; campsites are also available for a fee. it is also one of the endpoints of the Florida Trail.

== Architecture ==
=== Commercial buildings ===
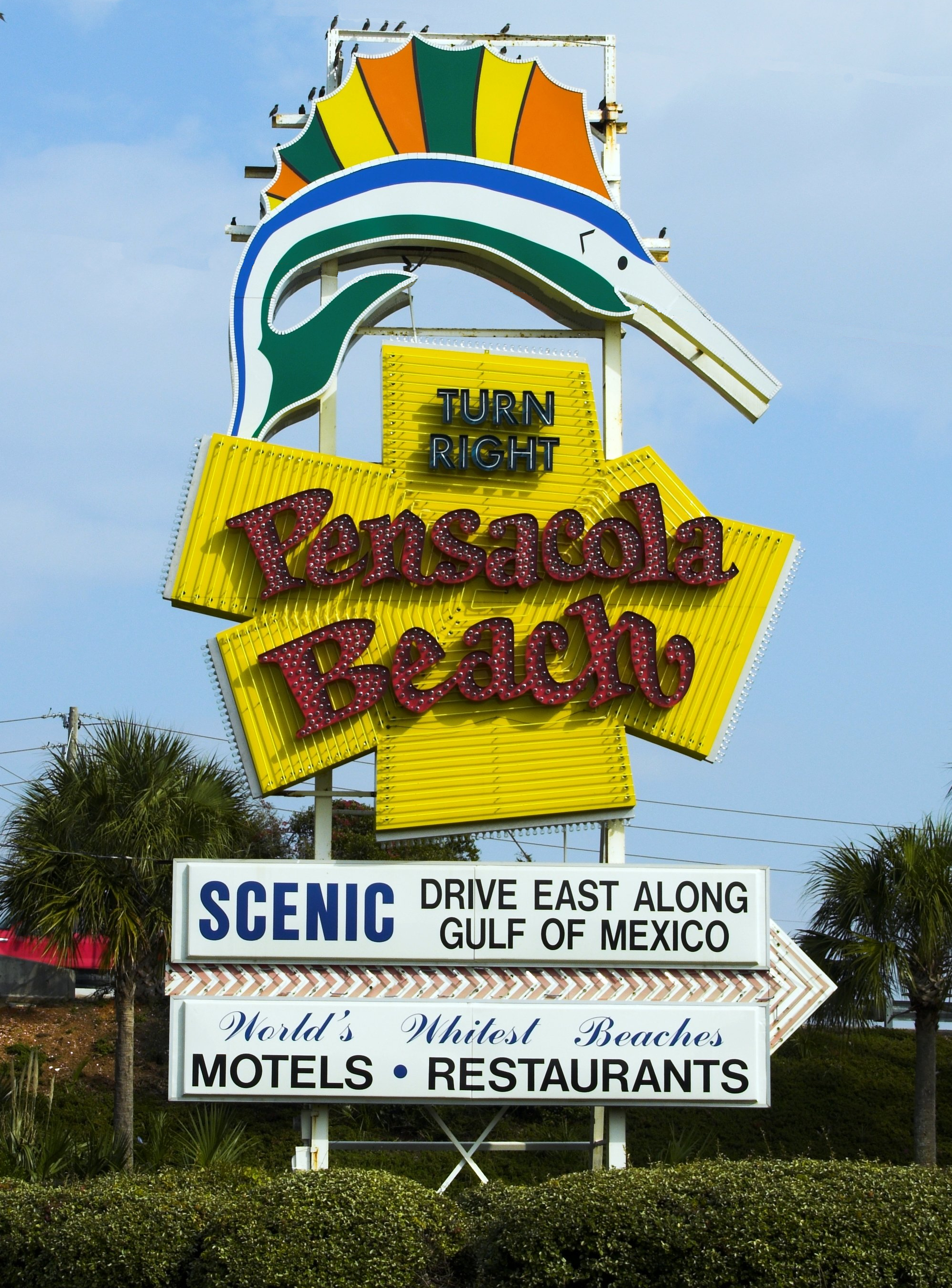
A Pensacola Beach sign welcomes drivers from Gulf Breeze Parkway to Pensacola Beach Road

Pensacola Beach is home to some of the tallest buildings between Tallahassee and Mobile, Alabama. The list below ranks the buildings in height.

1. Portofino Towers (255 feet, 78 m).
2. Verandas Tower (255 feet, 78 m).
3. Beach Club (243 feet, 74 m).
4. Hilton Pensacola Beach Resort (206 feet, 63 m).
5. Santa Rosa Towers (206 feet, 63 m).
6. Emerald Isle Condominium (206 feet, 63 m).
7. Santa Rosa Towers (206 feet, 63 m).
8. Tristan Towers (194 feet, 59 m).

=== Landmarks ===
==== Pensacola Beach welcome sign ====
Another historical landmark is the vintage Pensacola Beach sign just outside Pensacola Beach in Gulf Breeze. It was a 60s-era neon sign that directs drivers towards Pensacola Beach's "scenic" views of the coast of the Gulf of Mexico, as well as towards its white sand beaches, motels, and restaurants. The sign was renovated in 2019 to look exactly like the old sign but feature LED lights instead of neon.

==== Beach ball water tower ====
The beach ball painted water tower is an iconic symbol of Pensacola Beach. Today the water tower is no longer in use, but has been preserved by the city as a historical landmark.

=== Novelty houses ===
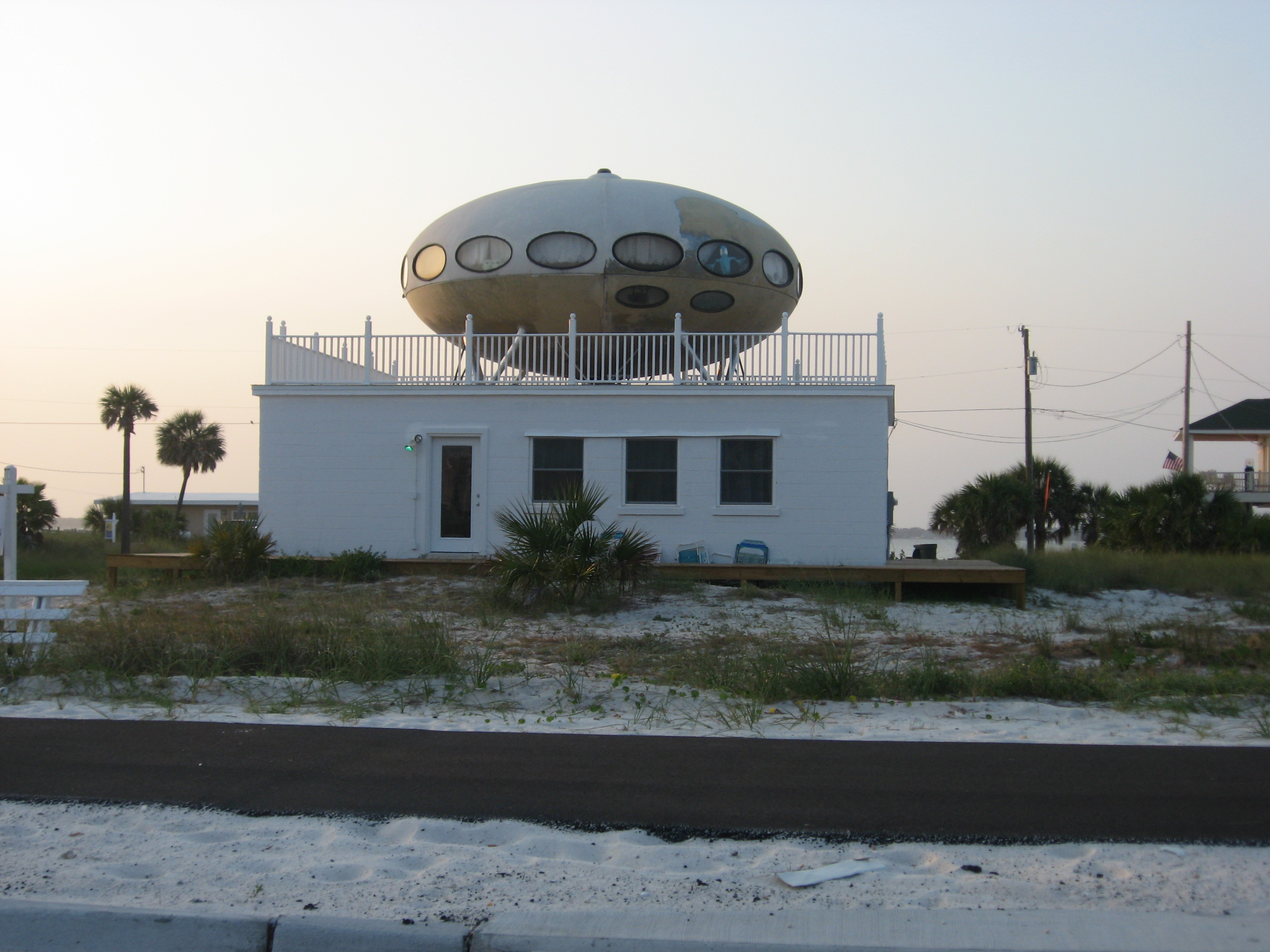
Pensacola's Futuro house

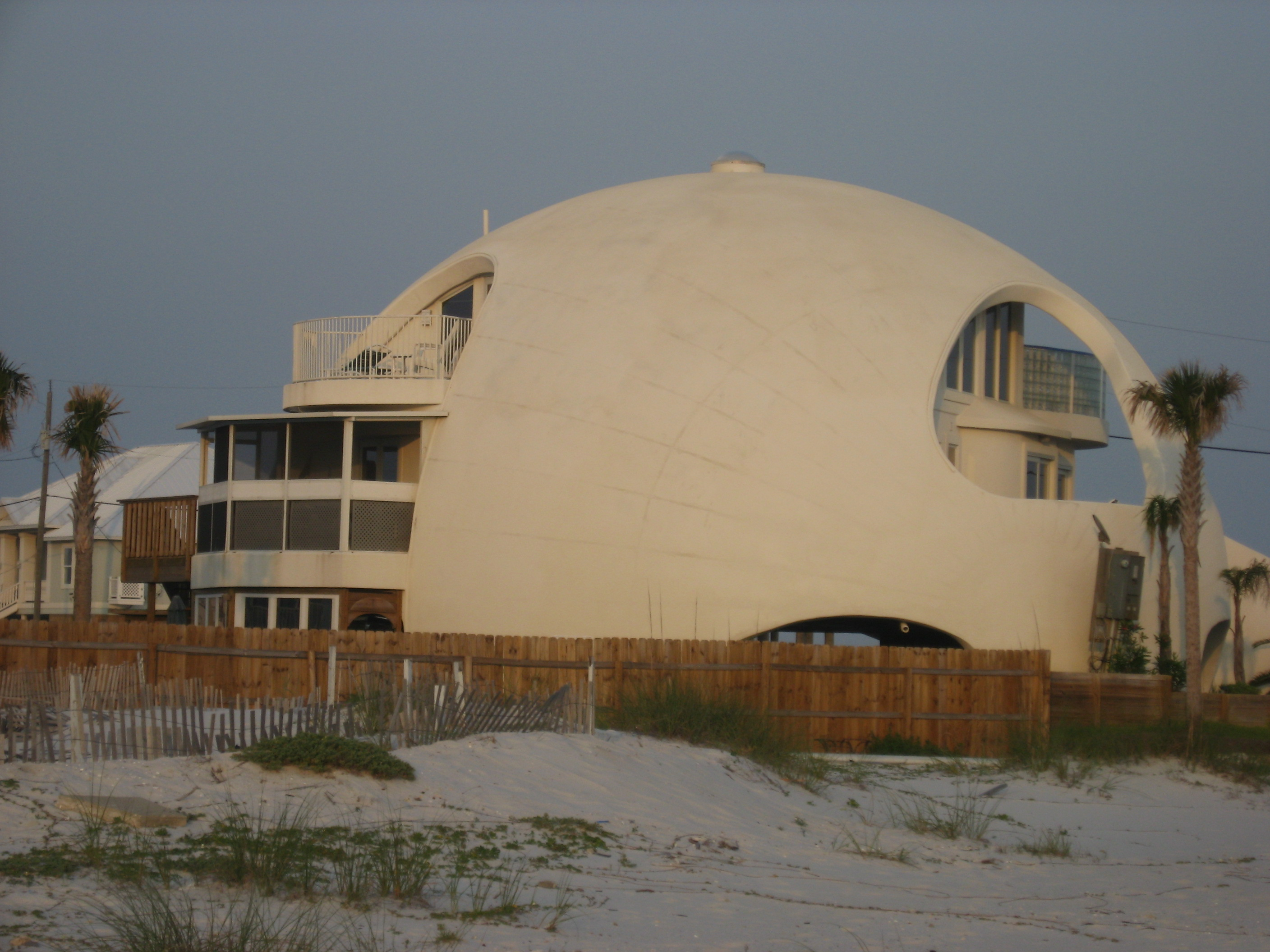
"Dome of a Home" in Pensacola Beach, FL

Pensacola Beach is home to several novelty houses, which are homes built with unusual shapes for purposes such as publicity or to copy other famous buildings in parody.

One of the novelty houses in Pensacola is the house "Dome of a Home", built in 2002 using a monolithic dome in the form of a large concrete dome, designed to structurally withstand storm surge and hurricane-force winds of 133 metres per second (300 mph). It withstood hurricanes Ivan and Dennis. It is also known as the "Flintstone Home" due to the fact it resembles a rock home.

Another novelty house is the house with a UFO-shaped Futuro attached as a second story. This Futuro house is sometimes known as the "Spaceship House". It was designed in the 1960s by Finnish architect Matti Suuronen. About a hundred of them were constructed.

== Education ==
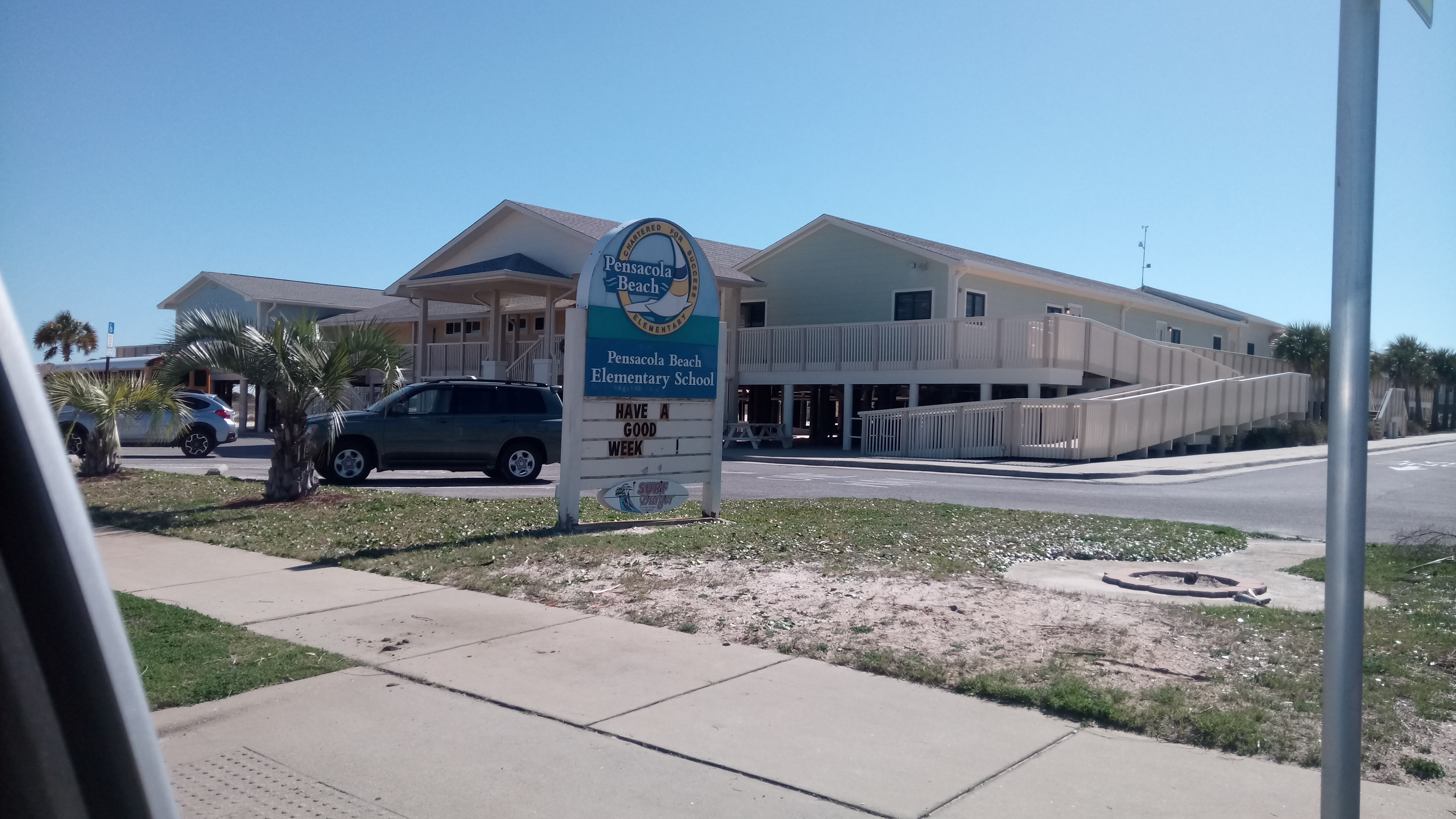
Pensacola Beach Elementary School

There is one school on Pensacola Beach. The Pensacola Beach Elementary School, within the Escambia County School District (ECSD), is for children from kindergarten through fifth grade. This school has an enrollment ranging from 120 to 140 students. All elementary-school age children on Pensacola Beach are eligible to attend the school. The first year the school was open, for the school year 1977–1978, classes were held in an empty A-frame house. The Pensacola Beach Volunteer Fire Department building was also used in aiding the teachers and administrators. In November 1977, four portable buildings were moved to the present site. They school has received the 5 Star School award since 1998. In 2001 the Pensacola Beach Elementary lost its direct district operational control and became a charter school. In September 2004 Hurricane Ivan destroyed an office and four classrooms. Jeff Castleberry, the principal, argued that ECSD would have closed the school if it had direct operational control. The costs to fix the damage at Pensacola Beach Elementary was $1.5 million. The campus is adjacent to the Gulf of Mexico and is built on stilt. The school has been described as one of several Escambia County charter schools that "exemplify charter schools at their finest".

Pensacola Beach is zoned for (assigned to) a different ECSD elementary school, Suter Elementary School, as well as Workman Middle School, and Pensacola High School. However, most middle- and high-school students in Pensacola Beach attend Gulf Breeze Middle School and Gulf Breeze High School, operated by Santa Rosa County School District. In addition, some attend Pensacola-area magnet schools.

== Religion ==
There are only two traditional churches on the island of Pensacola Beach. It is under the laws and guidelines of the Santa Rosa Island Authority that these be the only churches on the island. However, since around 2011, at least two other area churches have held satellite church meetings and openly worshipped on the water's edge on Sunday mornings.

== See also ==
- Operation Sandshaker
