= Navarre Beach Causeway =

- Coordinates: 30°23′49″N 86°51′47″W
- Carries: 2 general purpose lanes of CR 399 and 2 sidewalks
- Crosses: Santa Rosa Sound
- Locale: Navarre, Florida
- Other name: Navarre Beach Bridge
- Owner: Santa Rosa County

Characteristics
- Material: Concrete
- Total length: 576.1 feet (175.6 m)
- Clearance below: 48 feet (15 m)

History
- Opened: 1960

Statistics
- Toll: None; toll was removed in 2004

Location
- Interactive map of Navarre Beach Causeway

The Navarre Beach Causeway, also called the Navarre Beach Bridge, is a concrete bridge in Navarre, Florida, connecting the beach and mainland sides of the community. The bridge travels over the Santa Rosa Sound, which in turn, is part of the Intracoastal Waterway. The bridge is currently owned and managed by Santa Rosa County, as part of the roads and bridges department.

The bridge is a center point of the community and is included in the logos and symbols of many local businesses. The locally famous Navarre Beach sign is located on the mainland base of the bridge. The mainland side also used to contain a toll booth building but tolls were eliminated in 2004.

The Florida Department of Transportation rates the bridge as "functionally obsolete" due to it not meeting modern and current Coast Guard requirements regarding bridge height on the Intracoastal Waterway. In 2021, Santa Rosa County commissioners began the planning process for a replacement bridge, which is estimated to cost $80-120 million. The county also commissioned a study for a potential reintroduction of tolls, which would have an estimated revenue of $2.7-4.2 million per year if implemented.
