= National Register of Historic Places listings in Santa Rosa County, Florida =

Location of Santa Rosa County in Florida

This is a list of the National Register of Historic Places listings in Santa Rosa County, Florida.

This is intended to be a complete list of the properties and districts on the National Register of Historic Places in Santa Rosa County, Florida, United States. The locations of National Register properties and districts for which the latitude and longitude coordinates are included below, may be seen in a map.

There are 17 properties and districts listed on the National Register in the county.

This National Park Service list is complete through NPS recent listings posted June 13, 2025.

Contents: Counties in Florida (non-linked contain no National Register listings)
Alachua - Baker - Bay - Bradford - Brevard - Broward - Calhoun - Charlotte - Citrus - Clay - Collier - Columbia - DeSoto - Dixie - Duval - Escambia - Flagler - Franklin - Gadsden - Gilchrist - Glades - Gulf - Hamilton - Hardee - Hendry - Hernando - Highlands - Hillsborough (Tampa) - Holmes - Indian River - Jackson - Jefferson - Lafayette - Lake - Lee - Leon - Levy - Liberty - Madison - Manatee - Marion - Martin - Miami-Dade (Miami) - Monroe - Nassau - Okaloosa - Okeechobee - Orange - Osceola - Palm Beach - Pasco - Pinellas - Polk - Putnam - St. Johns - St. Lucie - Santa Rosa - Sarasota - Seminole - Sumter - Suwannee - Taylor - Union - Volusia - Wakulla - Walton - Washington

== Current listings ==
	Name on the Register	Image	Date listed	Location	City or town	Description
1	Arcadia Sawmill and Arcadia Cotton Mill	Arcadia Sawmill and Arcadia Cotton Mill	August 3, 1987 (#87001300)	Address Restricted; 30°36′35″N 87°05′03″W	Milton	
2	Bagdad Village Historic District	Bagdad Village Historic District	December 8, 1987 (#87001991)	Roughly bounded by Main, Water, and Oak Streets, Cobb and Woodville Roads, and Cemetery, Pooley, and School Streets; 30°36′01″N 87°02′04″W	Bagdad	
3	Bethune Blackwater Schooner		August 8, 1991 (#91000948)	Address Restricted	Milton	
4	Big Heart West		September 28, 1998 (#98001167)	Address Restricted	Gulf Breeze	Part of the Archeological Properties of the Naval Live Oaks Reservation MPS
5	Butcherpen Mound		September 28, 1998 (#98001165)	Address Restricted	Gulf Breeze	Part of the Archeological Properties of the Naval Live Oaks Reservation MPS
6	Fidelis School	Fidelis School	December 8, 2021 (#100007241)	13786 FL 87; 30°56′05″N 87°01′24″W	Jay vicinity (Fidelis)	
7	First American Road in Florida	First American Road in Florida	September 28, 1998 (#98001168)	Gulf Islands National Seashore-Naval Live Oaks Area; 30°22′09″N 87°08′21″W	Gulf Breeze	Part of the Archeological Properties of the Naval Live Oaks Reservation MPS
8	Florida State Road No. 1	Florida State Road No. 1	June 23, 1994 (#94000626)	Roughly, three sections east of Milton, parallel to U.S. Route 90, between Marquis Bayou and Harold; 30°37′54″N 86°59′28″W	Milton	
9	Louisville and Nashville Depot	Louisville and Nashville Depot	October 29, 1982 (#82001041)	206 Henry Street; 30°37′14″N 87°02′02″W	Milton	
10	Milton Historic District	Milton Historic District	November 12, 1987 (#87001944)	U.S. Route 90 at the Blackwater River, bounded by Berryhill, Willing, Hill, Canal, Margaret, and Susan Streets; 30°37′16″N 87°02′20″W	Milton	
11	Mt. Pilgrim African Baptist Church	Mt. Pilgrim African Baptist Church	May 29, 1992 (#92000634)	Junction of Alice and Clara Streets; 30°37′11″N 87°02′26″W	Milton	
12	Naval Live Oaks Cemetery		September 28, 1998 (#98001166)	Address Restricted	Gulf Breeze	Part of the Archeological Properties of the Naval Live Oaks Reservation MPS
13	Naval Live Oaks Reservation	Naval Live Oaks Reservation	September 28, 1998 (#98001169)	Gulf Islands National Seashore-Naval Live Oaks Area; 30°22′04″N 87°08′24″W	Gulf Breeze	Part of the Archeological Properties of the Naval Live Oaks Reservation MPS
14	Ollinger-Cobb House	Ollinger-Cobb House	January 11, 1983 (#83001440)	302 Pine Street; 30°37′09″N 87°02′16″W	Milton	
15	St. Mary's Episcopal Church and Rectory	St. Mary's Episcopal Church and Rectory	May 6, 1982 (#82002380)	300-301 Oak Street; 30°37′16″N 87°02′10″W	Milton	
16	Third Gulf Breeze		September 28, 1998 (#98001164)	Address Restricted	Gulf Breeze	Part of the Archeological Properties of the Naval Live Oaks Reservation MPS
17	Thomas Creek Archeological District		November 4, 1985 (#85003482)	Address Restricted	Chumuckla	

== See also ==
- List of National Historic Landmarks in Florida
- National Register of Historic Places listings in Florida
