= Fairpoint Peninsula =

Peninsula in northwest Florida, U.S.

Fairpoint Peninsula Navarre Peninsula, Gulf Breeze Peninsula, or Santa Rosa Peninsula
- Peninsula
- Location within Florida
- Coordinates: 30°23′33″N 87°1′33″W
- Water bodies: Pensacola Bay, East Bay, East Lagoon, and the East Bay River (North); Santa Rosa Sound (South)
- Operator: Various municipalities, county-governed unincorporated areas, and census designated places

The Fairpoint Peninsula, also referred to as the Gulf Breeze Peninsula or the Navarre Peninsula or historically the Santa Rosa Peninsula, is located in northwest Florida between Santa Rosa Sound (the location of the Gulf Intracoastal Waterway's route through the region) and Pensacola Bay.

== History ==
In 1559, Tristan de Luna arrived in Pensacola Bay with 500 Spanish soldiers. The first settlement was abandoned due to diseases, disasters and hostile natives, but other Europeans followed. In the late 1700s, the British occupied the peninsula and named it Town Point.

In the 1910s, before widespread development, turpentine production was widely present on the peninsula.

By the early 1930s, bridges between Pensacola and Gulf Breeze and Gulf Breeze and Pensacola Beach were completed. The current route of U.S. Highway 98 was also completed, operated as a toll road between 1939 and 1946. Gulf Breeze's namesake was established in 1936 when the Gulf Breeze Cottages and Store opened a post office branch where Live Oaks Plaza now stands.

The Naval Live Oaks Reservation was the home of America's first experimental tree farm, established by President John Quincy Adams in 1828. It was established to provide raw material to support shipbuilding for the Navy in the area. Today, Naval Live Oaks is part of the Gulf Islands National Seashore, a unit of the National Park Service.

== Communities ==
Based on the most recent censuses, and estimates, these are the communities located on the Fairport Peninsula, with their populations (if known):

- Navarre, Florida - Population: 44,876
- Midway, Florida - Population: 16,115
- Gulf Breeze, Florida - Population: 6,466
- Tiger Point, Florida - Population: 3,096
- Woodlawn Beach, Florida - Population: 1,785
- Oriole Beach, Florida - Population: 1,420

The following communities are adjacent to the peninsula, and are sometimes considered part of the Fairpoint Peninsula region, or are considered to be a part of one of the larger communities on the peninsula:

- Holley, Florida - Population: 1,630 (Often considered to be a neighborhood of Navarre)
- Pensacola Beach, Florida - Population: Not Recorded (Often considered to be a neighborhood of Gulf Breeze or Pensacola)
- Navarre Beach, part of Navarre, is on Santa Rosa Island and not on the peninsula
