= First American Road in Florida =

- U.S. National Register of Historic Places
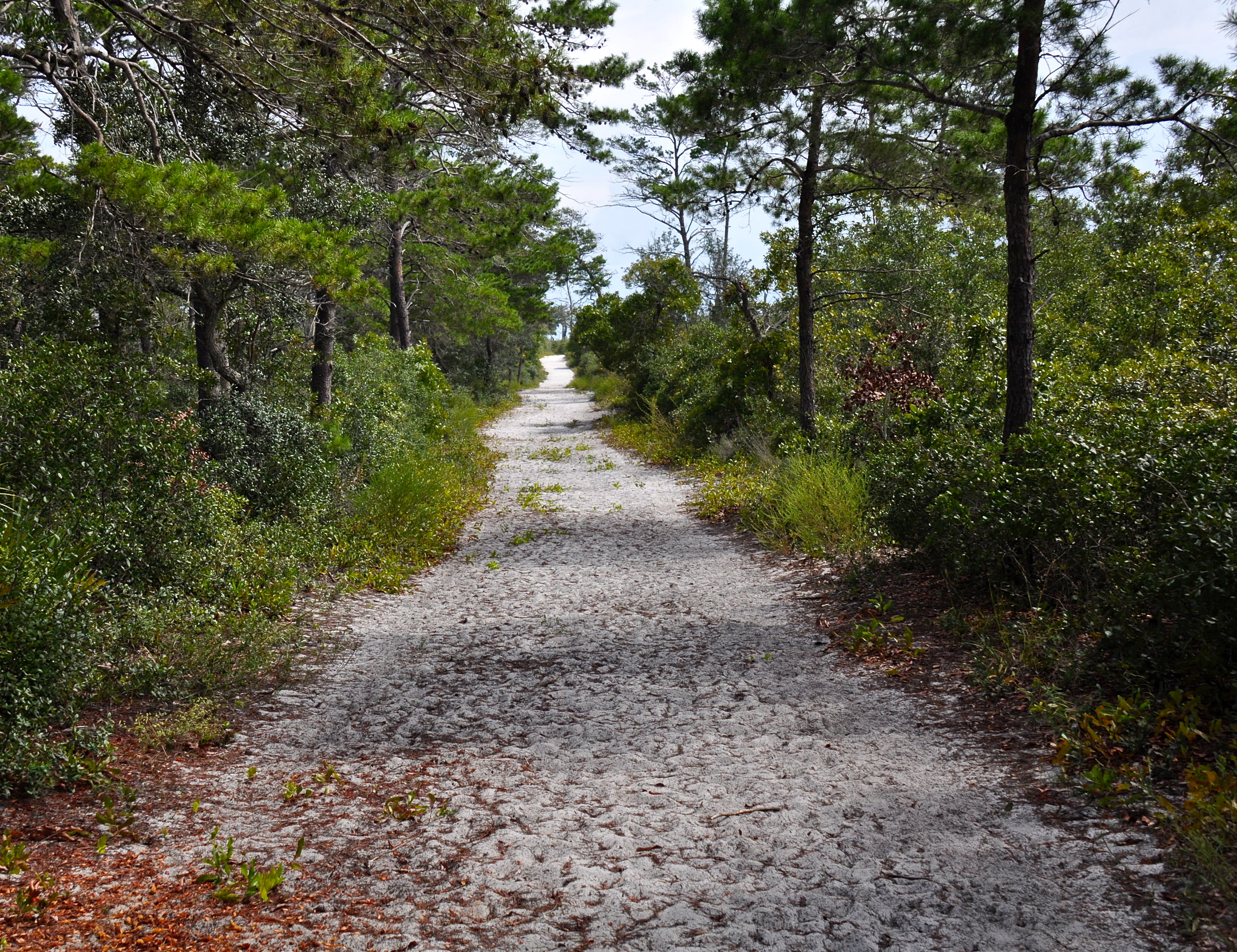
- First American Road in Florida, September 2014.

- Location within Florida
- Location: Santa Rosa County, Florida
- Nearest city: Gulf Breeze
- Coordinates: 30°21′25.7184″N 87°9′49.8846″W
- MPS: Archeological Properties of the Naval Live Oaks Reservation MPS
- NRHP reference No.: 98001168
- Added to NRHP: September 28, 1998

The First American Road in Florida (also known as the Andrew Jackson Trail or Military Road) is a historic road near Gulf Breeze, Florida. It is located in the Naval Live Oaks Area of the Gulf Islands National Seashore.

== History ==
After the Adams–Onís Treaty went into effect in 1821, Pensacola, along with the rest of the Florida Territory was officially transferred from Spain to the United States. In 1824, the US Congress provided funding to build the Pensacola-St. Augustine Road, known as Bellamy Road, in order to connect East Florida with West Florida. On September 28, 1998, the Andrew Jackson Trail was added to the National Register of Historic Places.

== See also ==
- Bellamy Road
