= Gulf Breeze Zoo =

Zoo in Woodlawn Beach, Florida, United States

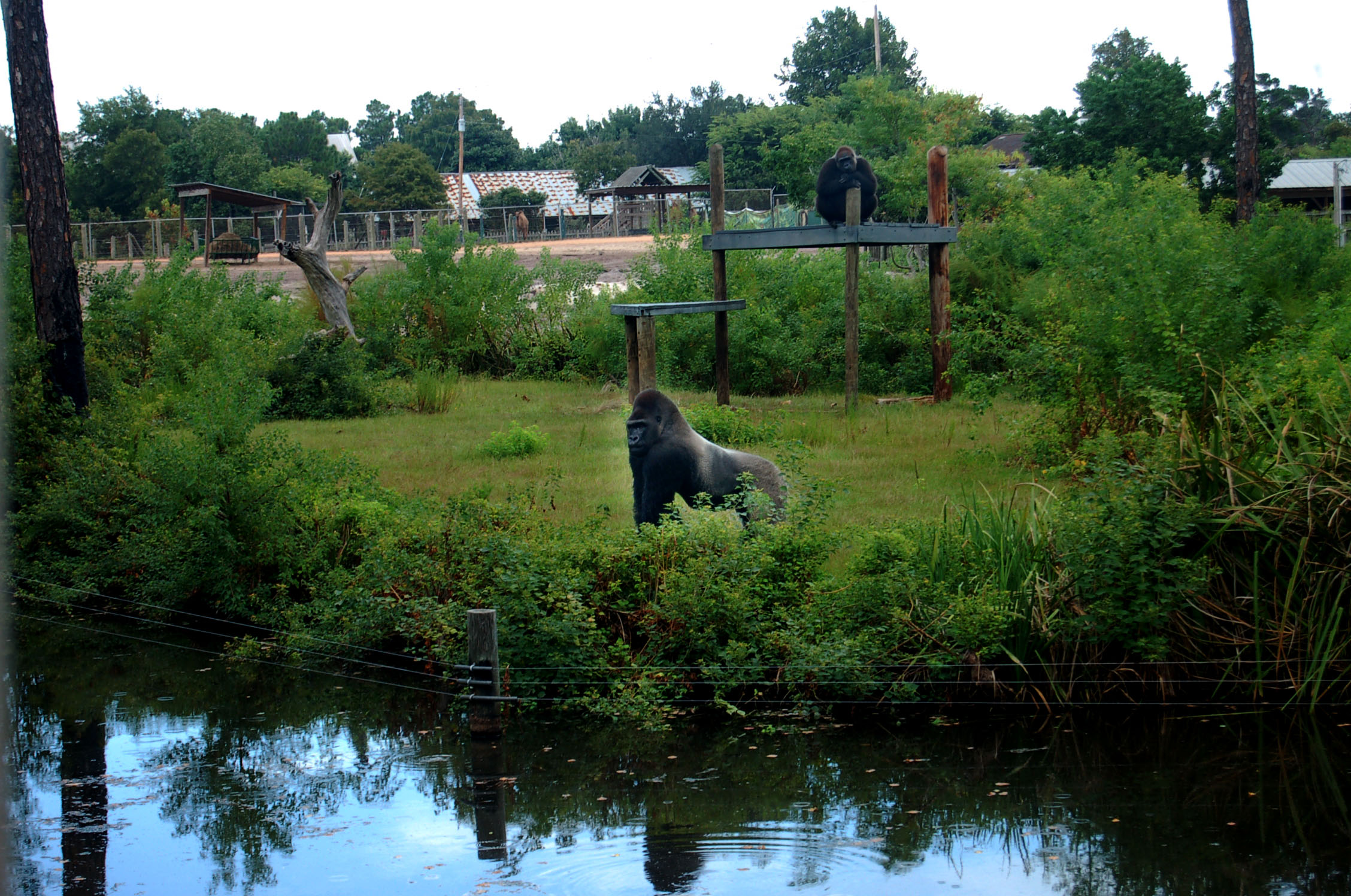
- Gorillas at Gulf Breeze Zoo
- Interactive map of Gulf Breeze Zoo
- 30.401141°N 86.984391°W
- Date opened: 1984 (as The Zoo Northwest Florida), 18 February 2010 (as Gulf Breeze Zoo)
- Location: Woodlawn Beach, Florida, United States
- Land area: 50 acres (20 ha)
- No. of animals: 900
- Major exhibits: train ride, petting area
- Website: gbzoo.com

The Gulf Breeze Zoo (originally The Zoo Northwest Florida) is a 50-acre (20 ha) zoo located in Woodlawn Beach, Florida, neighboring Navarre and Gulf Breeze, Florida. The zoo has over 900 exotic animals including rhinos, hippos, Western lowland gorillas, and orangutans that visitors can view during an African preserve train ride. Activities include hand-feeding of some animals including giraffes. The Gulf Breeze Zoo supports captive breeding, wildlife conservation, and habitat preservation programs.

== History ==
The zoo started on an acre of land on Burgess Road and later on a larger tract in Cantonment, Florida. It was established in its current location in 1984 by four local businessmen. Pat Quinn, one of the founders, became its first director. The zoo began with about 60 animals on 19 acres of land.

In 2004, unable to make a profit, the founders handed over ownership to the nonprofit Gulf Coast Zoological Society. Later in 2004 and then in 2005, hurricanes Ivan and Dennis struck the area with devastating effect to the Zoo. The zoo closed temporarily on August 17, 2009, awaiting the decisions from the governments of Escambia and Santa Rosa counties to provide $125,000 each in funding. On August 20, 2009, county officials announced that the closure of the zoo would be permanent.

In December 2009, the zoo was purchased and rescued by a team of zoological professionals from Virginia Safari Park of Natural Bridge, Virginia. It was renovated and reopened on February 18, 2010, as Gulf Breeze Zoo.

On January 20, 2018, the first baby white rhino was born at Gulf Breeze Zoo. She was the first ever rhino calf to be born in its 34-year history. Also in 2018, the zoo, which at that time was about 50 acres, purchased 35 acres of additional land on the west side of the current site on U.S. 98.

In February 2019, a family of six orangutans arrived at the zoo from a conservation center in Connecticut.

== Exhibits ==
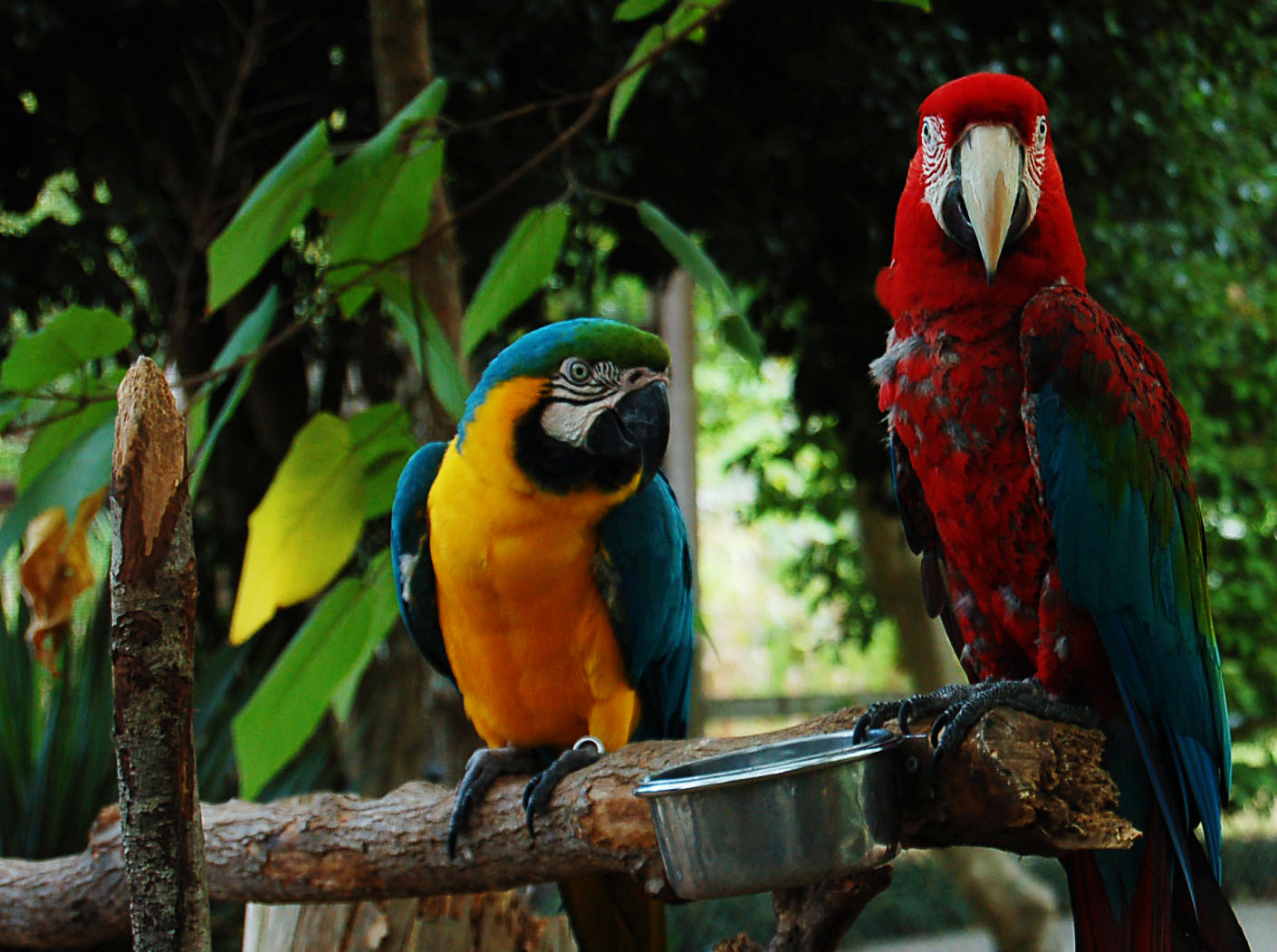
Macaws up close in a section of the walking portion of the preserve.

The Gulf Breeze Zoo is divided into 20 acres of walking exhibits and a 30 acres free roaming preserve area that guests take a guided train ride through. The walking portion includes many animals including American black bears, lions, tigers, clouded leopards, red kangaroo, Galapagos tortoises, and a large variety of exotic birds such as American flamingos, Indian peafowl, owls, macaws, king vultures, laughing kookaburra, ostriches and toucans. The Zoo has several interactive feeding areas including a large petting area, a giraffe feeding area, and a walk-through budgerigar enclosure.

Other highlighted exhibits throughout the park include warthogs, Asian small-clawed otters, American alligators, and dromedary camels. Primate exhibits include ring-tailed lemurs, lar gibbons, siamangs, Schmidt's guenon, golden-headed lion tamarins, black-headed spider monkeys, western lowland gorillas, and Bornean orangutans. Activities include feeding some animals including giraffes, goats, highland cattle and alligators, as well as a free-flight Australian parakeet aviary.

Another unique area of the walking portion of the Zoo includes a large raised boardwalk that allows visitors to see herds of various hoofstock, capybara, pygmy hippos and orangutans.

A C.P. Huntington locomotive train takes visitors on a 20-minute guided tour, where they can see axis deer, blackbuck, blue wildebeest, greater kudu, sable antelope, Thomson's gazelle, an Indian rhino, and white rhinos roaming on 30 acres and get a close view of the gorillas and hippos.
