= Archeological Properties of the Naval Live Oaks Reservation MPS =

- U.S. National Register of Historic Places
- Location within Florida Location within the United States
- Location: Santa Rosa County, Florida
- Coordinates: 30°26′N 87°12′W
- MPS
- NRHP reference No.: 64500092

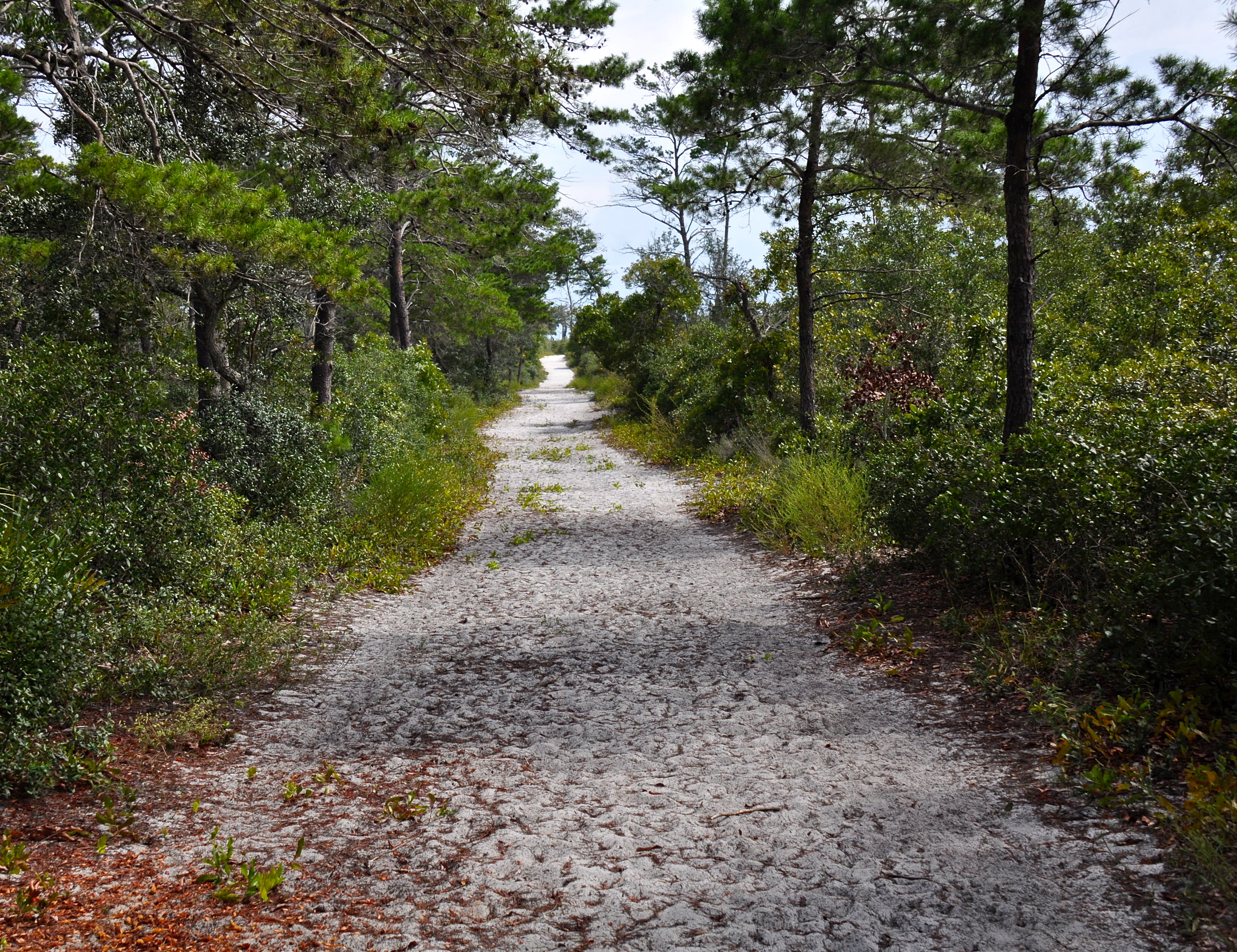

The following buildings were added to the National Register of Historic Places as part of the Archeological Properties of the Naval Live Oaks Reservation Multiple Property Submission (or MPS).

| Resource Name | Also known as | Address | City | County | Added |
|---|---|---|---|---|---|
| Big Heart West | | Address Restricted | Gulf Breeze | Santa Rosa County | September 28, 1998 |
| Butcherpen Mound | | Address Restricted | Gulf Breeze | Santa Rosa County | September 28, 1998 |
| First American Road in Florida | | Gulf Islands National Seashore-Naval Live Oaks Area | Gulf Breeze | Santa Rosa County | September 28, 1998 |
| Naval Live Oaks Cemetery | | Address Restricted | Gulf Breeze | Santa Rosa County | September 28, 1998 |
| Naval Live Oaks Reservation | | Gulf Islands National Seashore-Naval Live Oaks Area | Gulf Breeze | Santa Rosa County | September 28, 1998 |
| Third Gulf Breeze | | Address Restricted | Gulf Breeze | Santa Rosa County | September 28, 1998 |
