= Major (United States) =

Field-grade military officer rank

- U.S. Army, U.S. Air Force, and U.S. Space Force insignia of the rank of major. Style and method of wear vary between the services.

- Shoulder boards

- USMC insignia of the rank of major; also the rank insignia for a lieutenant commander in the sea services.
- Country: United States
- Service branch: U.S. Army; U.S. Marine Corps; U.S. Air Force; U.S. Space Force
- Abbreviation: MAJ (Army); Maj (Marine Corps / Air Force / Space Force)
- Rank group: Field Grade Officer
- NATO rank code: OF-3
- Pay grade: O-4
- Next higher rank: Lieutenant colonel
- Next lower rank: Captain
- Equivalent ranks: Lieutenant commander (U.S. Navy and U.S. Coast Guard)

In the United States Army, Marine Corps, Air Force and Space Force, major is a field officer above the rank of captain and below the rank of lieutenant colonel. It is equivalent to the rank of lieutenant commander in the Navy and Coast Guard. Although lieutenant commanders are considered junior officers by their services, majors are senior officers.

The pay grade for the rank of major is O-4. The insignia for the rank consists of a golden oak leaf, with slight stylized differences between the versions of the different services. Promotion to the rank of major is governed by the Department of Defense policies derived from the Defense Officer Personnel Management Act of 1980.

== Army ==
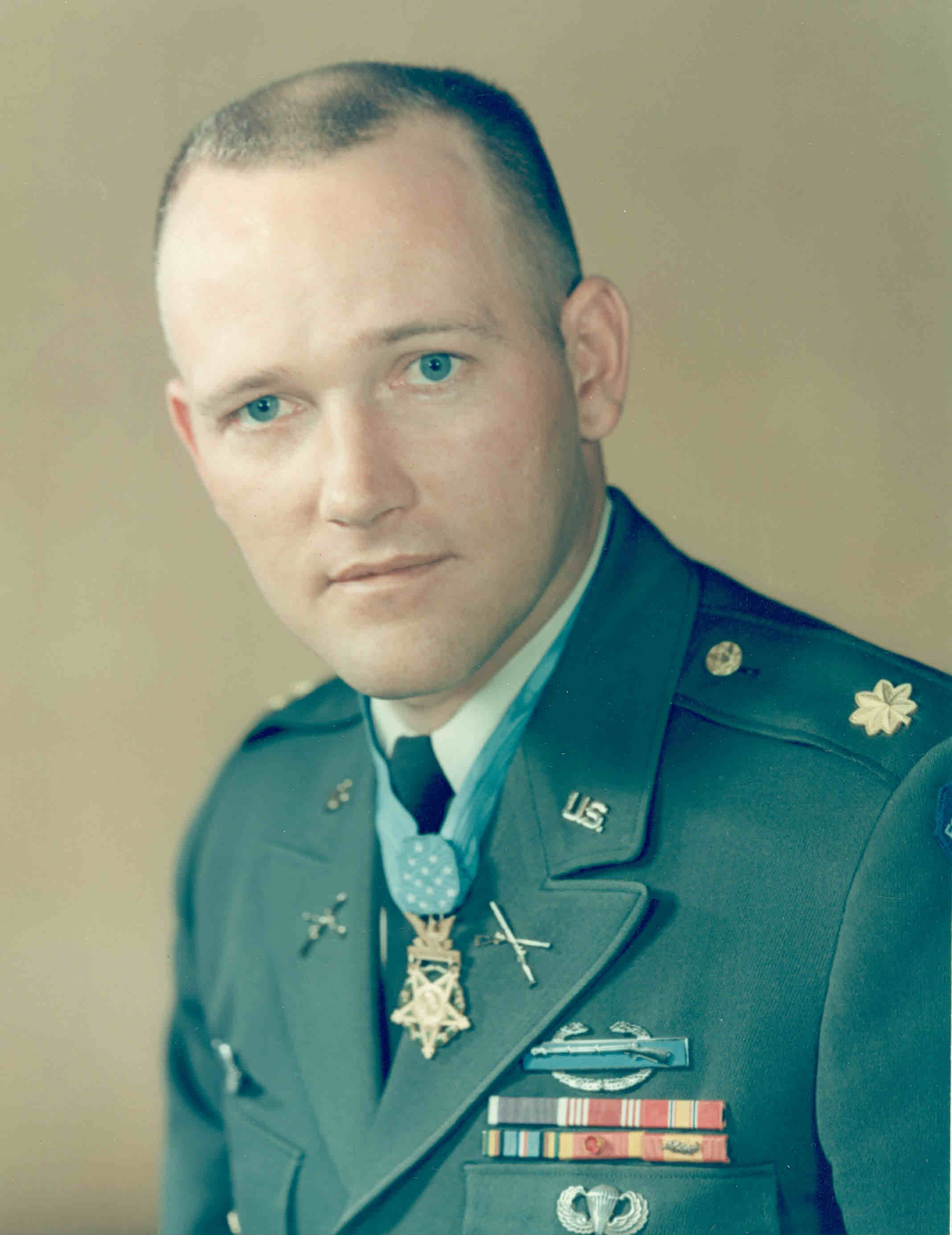
Major Roger Donlon, US Army. Note golden oak leaf insignia on shoulder board.

A major in the U.S. Army typically serves as a battalion executive officer (XO) or as the battalion operations officer (S3). Majors can also serve as company commanding officers, a major can also serve as a primary staff officer for a regiment, brigade or task force in the areas concerning personnel, logistics, intelligence, and operations. A major will also be a staff officer / action officer on higher staffs and headquarters. In addition, majors command augmented companies in Combat Service and Service Support units. U.S. Army majors also command special operations companies, such as U.S. Army Special Forces companies, Civil Affairs companies, Military Information Support Operations companies, and certain types of separate, numbered vice lettered, Military Intelligence companies.

In the 1830s, the Army selected an oak leaf as the rank insignia for a major, though the rationale for the choice remains unclear. Oak leaves and acorns were used in the early American army on high ranking officer's headwear and may have come from the British or Germans as oak leafs and acorns were used in German uniforms in the 18th Century. The Army and US Air Force oak leaf is a stylized gold leaf that does not represent any individual tree.

Selected majors in the United States Army attend the 10-month Command and General Staff School at Fort Leavenworth, with a greater number attending satellite schools administered by Fort Leavenworth at Fort Belvoir, Virginia and Redstone Arsenal, Alabama. 960 graduated from the Leavenworth course in 2009, at the time the largest class in Army history.

=== American Revolution ===
The Continental Army mostly followed the organization and rank structure of the British Army. A regiment consisted of eight companies with three officers (a captain, lieutenant and ensign) and about 60 enlisted men each. The field-grade officers of a regiment were the colonel, the lieutenant colonel and a major. The major was the regiment's third in command and, at least in theory, would command one of the regiment's two battalions if the regiment were divided for tactical purposes. A Revolutionary War major was usually the executive officer - in charge of daily life in camp. He would be in charge of drill, discipline and duties.

=== American Civil War ===
U.S. Army major rank insignia during the 1860s

During the American Civil War the Union Army continued to use the existing titles of rank and rank insignia established for the U.S. Army. After the Southern states seceded and became the Confederacy, the Confederate army retained the same titles of rank as its U.S. counterpart, but developed a new system of rank identification and insignia for its officers.

While U.S. officers continued to wear their rank insignia on their shoulder straps, Confederate officers wore their rank insignia on the collar (one, two, or three horizontal gold bars for lieutenants and captains; one, two, or three gold stars for field grade officers; and three gold stars surrounded by a wreath for all general officers), as well as rows of gold lace forming an Austrian knot pattern on each sleeve. The number of rows of gold lace increased with the rank of the officer.

=== Post–Civil War ===
1957 to 2015 U.S. Army major rank insignia

In the late 1800s the US Army changed from the traditional ten-company regiment to one of twelve companies organized into three four-company battalions, each commanded by a major. After World War I, battalion commanders became lieutenant colonels. The basic regimental organization remained standard until after the Korean War, when regiments with organic battalions were no longer used as tactical units. Battalions attached to brigades replaced the regiment. Battalions commanded by lieutenant colonels became the US Army's basic tactical unit. As a result, there were only a limited number of command positions for majors although Medical, Special Forces and Aviation companies are usually commanded by majors.

== Marine Corps ==
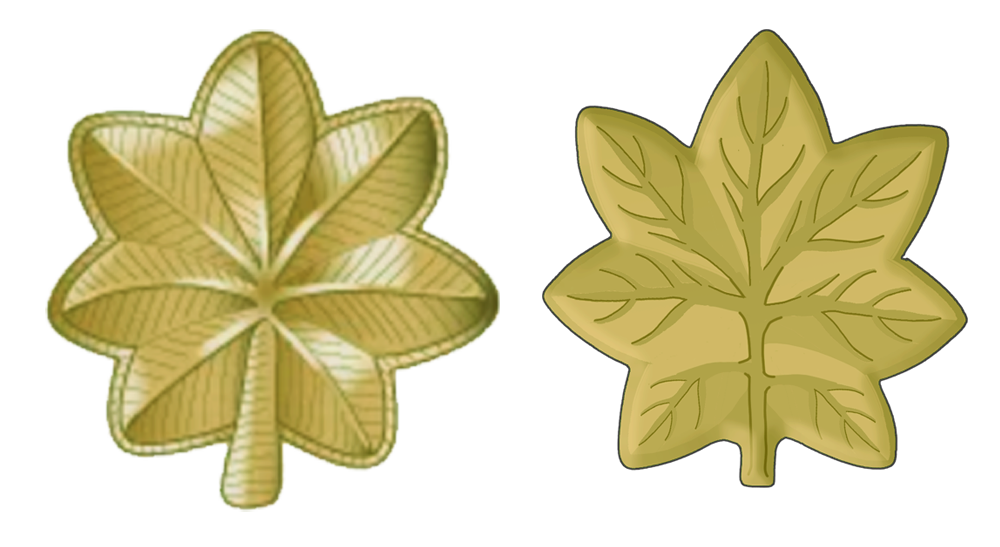
US Army/Air Force style major insignia on the left and US Marine Corps on the right

Within the Marine Corps, a major is a commissioned officer who will usually serve in roles such as battalion executive officer, weapons company commander, or as members of regimental or brigade staff. The USMC majors wear an oak leaf insignia that differs slightly from the US Army/US Air Force. The naval services version is styled similar to a southern live oak leaf grown in the Naval Live Oaks Reservation in the 19th Century.

== Air Force ==
A major in the Air Force typically has duties as a senior staff officer at the squadron and wing level. In flying squadrons majors are generally flight commanders or assistant directors of operations. In the mission support and maintenance groups majors may occasionally be squadron commanders. In the medical corps, a major may be the head of a clinic or flight.

== Space Force ==
A major in the Space Force typically has duties as a senior staff officer at the squadron and delta levels.

== Insignia ==
U.S. Army rank insignia of a major.

U.S. Marine Corps rank insignia of a major.

U.S. Air Force rank insignia of a major.

U.S. Space Force rank insignia of a major.
