= Live Oak Cemetery (disambiguation) =

Live Oak Cemetery is an historic cemetery in Selma, Alabama that was founded in 1829.

Live Oak Cemetery may also refer to:

- Live Oak Cemetery, in Dublin, Texas
- Live Oak Cemetery (Walterboro, South Carolina), in Walterboro, South Carolina where several politicians are buried
- Live Oak Cemetery, in Pass Christian, Mississippi where John Henderson and Doyle Overton Hickey are buried
- Live Oak Cemetery, in Sandusky, Ohio where Joseph Cable is buried
- Live Oak Cemetery, in Concord, California where the founders of Clayton, California are buried
- Live Oak Cemetery, in Paulding, Ohio where Francis B. De Witt and John S. Snook are buried
- Live Oak Memorial Park, in Monrovia, California where William Norton Monroe is buried
- Naval Live Oaks Cemetery, a prehistoric cemetery in Gulf Breeze, Florida
