= Oriole Beach, Florida =

Oriole Beach
- Census Designated Place
- Oriole Beach CDP, Florida
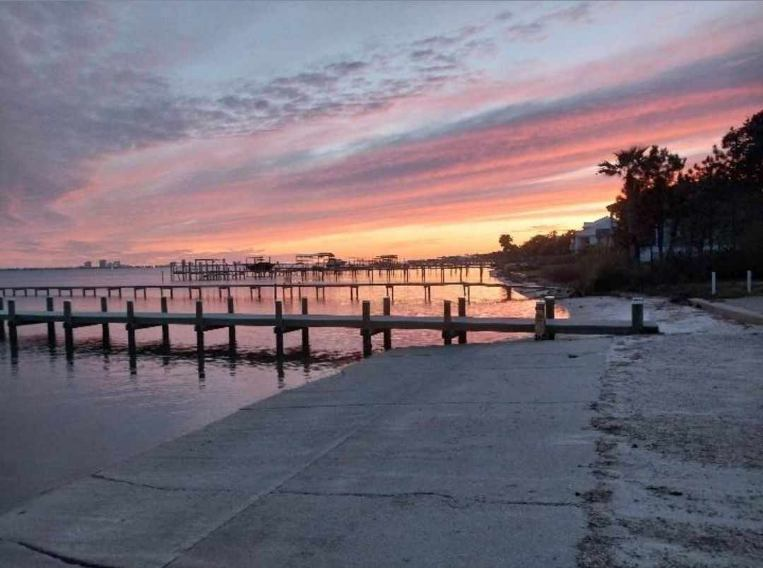
- Oriole Beach Boat Ramp Gulf Breeze, Florida
- Nickname: Home of the Sea Turtles
- Interactive map of Oriole Beach
- Coordinates: 30°22′27″N 87°05′45″W
- Country: United States
- State: Florida
- County: Santa Rosa
- Elevation: 0 ft (0 m)

Population (2020)
  - Total: 1,679
- Time zone: UTC-6 (Central (CST))
  - Summer (DST): UTC-5 (CDT)
- ZIP code: 32563
- Area code: 850
- GNIS feature ID: 2629560

Oriole Beach is an unincorporated community located in Santa Rosa County, Florida, United States on Santa Rosa Sound. It lies east of Gulf Breeze on the Fairpoint Peninsula, and about three miles north of Pensacola Beach. The population was 1,679 at the 2020 census, up from 1,420 at the 2010 census. Oriole Beach is part of the Pensacola–Ferry Pass–Brent, Florida Metropolitan Statistical Area.

== Description ==
The main access road is U.S. Route 98, which runs east to west along the peninsula. The community has its roots as a beach cottage fishing retreat for the residents of Pensacola; some of the original cement block beach cottages are still standing. Permanent homes in Oriole Beach were built along Bay Street which follows an old Indian trail and, subsequently, a logging road that was used to harvest live oak trees for the construction of Civil war sailing ships by the Union Navy in the 1860s. The logging road connected to the Andrew Jackson Trail which linked Pensacola with Jacksonville. The Naval Live Oaks Reservation encompasses a portion of the land where the harvesting took place and where some of the live oak trees continue to grow.

== Demographics ==
Oriole Beach first appeared as a census designated place in the 2010 U.S. census.

=== 2020 census ===
As of the 2020 census, Oriole Beach had a population of 1,679. The median age was 42.9 years. 24.7% of residents were under the age of 18 and 15.7% of residents were 65 years of age or older. For every 100 females there were 87.8 males, and for every 100 females age 18 and over there were 87.3 males age 18 and over.

100.0% of residents lived in urban areas, while 0.0% lived in rural areas.

There were 659 households in Oriole Beach, of which 30.3% had children under the age of 18 living in them. Of all households, 58.4% were married-couple households, 6.5% were households with a male householder and no spouse or partner present, and 28.2% were households with a female householder and no spouse or partner present. About 23.4% of all households were made up of individuals and 13.2% had someone living alone who was 65 years of age or older.

There were 699 housing units, of which 5.7% were vacant. The homeowner vacancy rate was 1.9% and the rental vacancy rate was 4.4%.

Racial composition as of the 2020 census
Race	Number	Percent
White	1,403	83.6%
Black or African American	13	0.8%
American Indian and Alaska Native	14	0.8%
Asian	53	3.2%
Native Hawaiian and Other Pacific Islander	3	0.2%
Some other race	23	1.4%
Two or more races	170	10.1%
Hispanic or Latino (of any race)	112	6.7%

=== 2010 census ===
According to the U.S. Census Bureau, there were 1,420 people living in Oriole Beach in 2010.

== History ==
In 1985, a homeowners' association was founded in Oriole Beach; it facilitated the construction of a new boat ramp and bicycle path. The bicycle path is part of the W.D. Childers trail that loops approximately 28 miles around the Fairpoint Peninsula. The only school in Oriole Beach, Oriole Beach Elementary School, is part of the Santa Rosa County School District.

Hurricane Ivan made landfall about 30 miles east of Oriole Beach in November 2004. The tidal surge was recorded at 12 feet and the sustained winds were in excess of 120 miles per hour. The Bay Street elevation of Oriole Beach is about 7.0 feet above mean sea level, so some homes on grade were destroyed. Most of the hurricane debris was removed by Santa Rosa County with Federal Emergency Management Agency (FEMA) grant money. As of spring 2007, a few structures and pine trees damaged by Ivan remain to be demolished and removed.

In February 2007, the Bay Street roadway was made three feet wider and about six inches higher by the Santa Rosa County Engineering Department.. New home construction is now required by the County Land Development Code to be connected to a sanitary sewer force main rather than septic tanks, the practice before Hurricane Ivan. The city of Gulf Breeze supplies sanitary sewer and natural gas service to the community. Potable water is supplied by a private water system from two elevated tanks connected to local water wells.
