= Lieutenant commander (United States) =

Naval rank of the United States

- Insignia of the rank of lieutenant commander
- Country: United States
- Service branch: United States Navy; United States Coast Guard; United States Public Health Service Commissioned Corps; NOAA Commissioned Officer Corps; US Maritime Service
- Abbreviation: LCDR
- Rank group: Mid-grade Officer
- NATO rank code: OF-3
- Pay grade: O-4
- Next higher rank: Commander
- Next lower rank: Lieutenant
- Equivalent ranks: Major

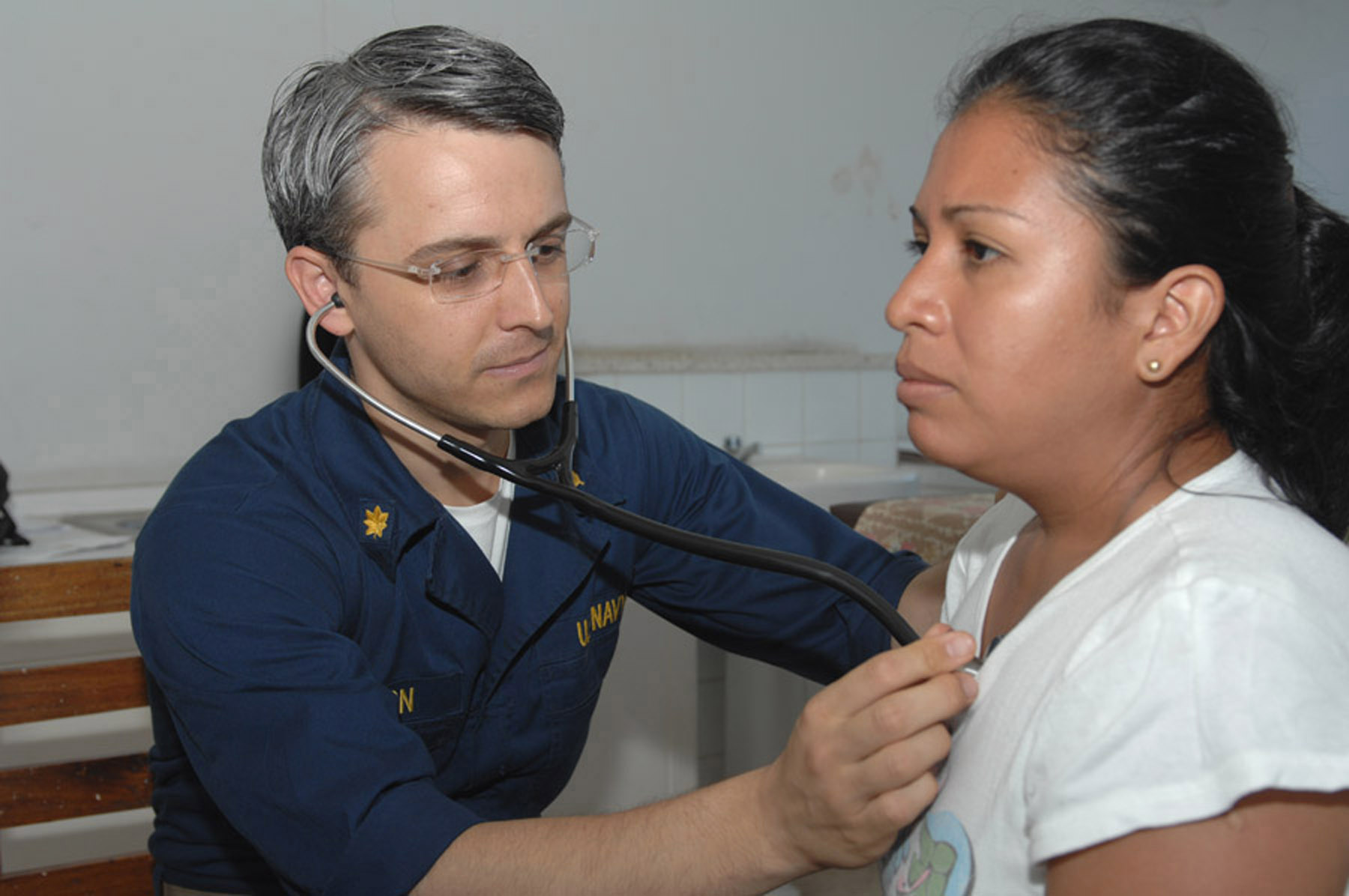
A lieutenant commander providing medical care aboard USNS Comfort (T-AH 20); note golden oak leaf insignia.

Lieutenant commander (LCDR) is considered a mid-grade officer rank in the United States Navy, the United States Coast Guard, the United States Public Health Service Commissioned Corps, and the National Oceanic and Atmospheric Administration Commissioned Officer Corps (NOAA Corps), with the pay grade of O-4 and NATO rank code OF-3. The United States Maritime Services (USMS), a voluntary training organization of the U.S. Department of Transportation, also uses the rank of lieutenant commander.

Lieutenant commander ranks above lieutenant and below commander. The rank is also used in the United States Maritime Service. The rank is equivalent to a major in the United States Army, United States Air Force, United States Marine Corps, and United States Space Force.

When introducing a lieutenant commander, their full rank should always be used; however, in general conversation they are usually called "commander" even though they are not "full" commanders (which is one rank higher). Simply "lieutenant" is never used because it is one rank lower.

Promotion to lieutenant commander in the U.S. Navy is governed by United States Department of Defense policies derived from the Defense Officer Personnel Management Act of 1980. DOPMA guidelines suggest 70-90% of lieutenants should be promoted to lieutenant commander after serving a minimum of three years as lieutenants and after attaining nine to eleven years of cumulative commissioned service.

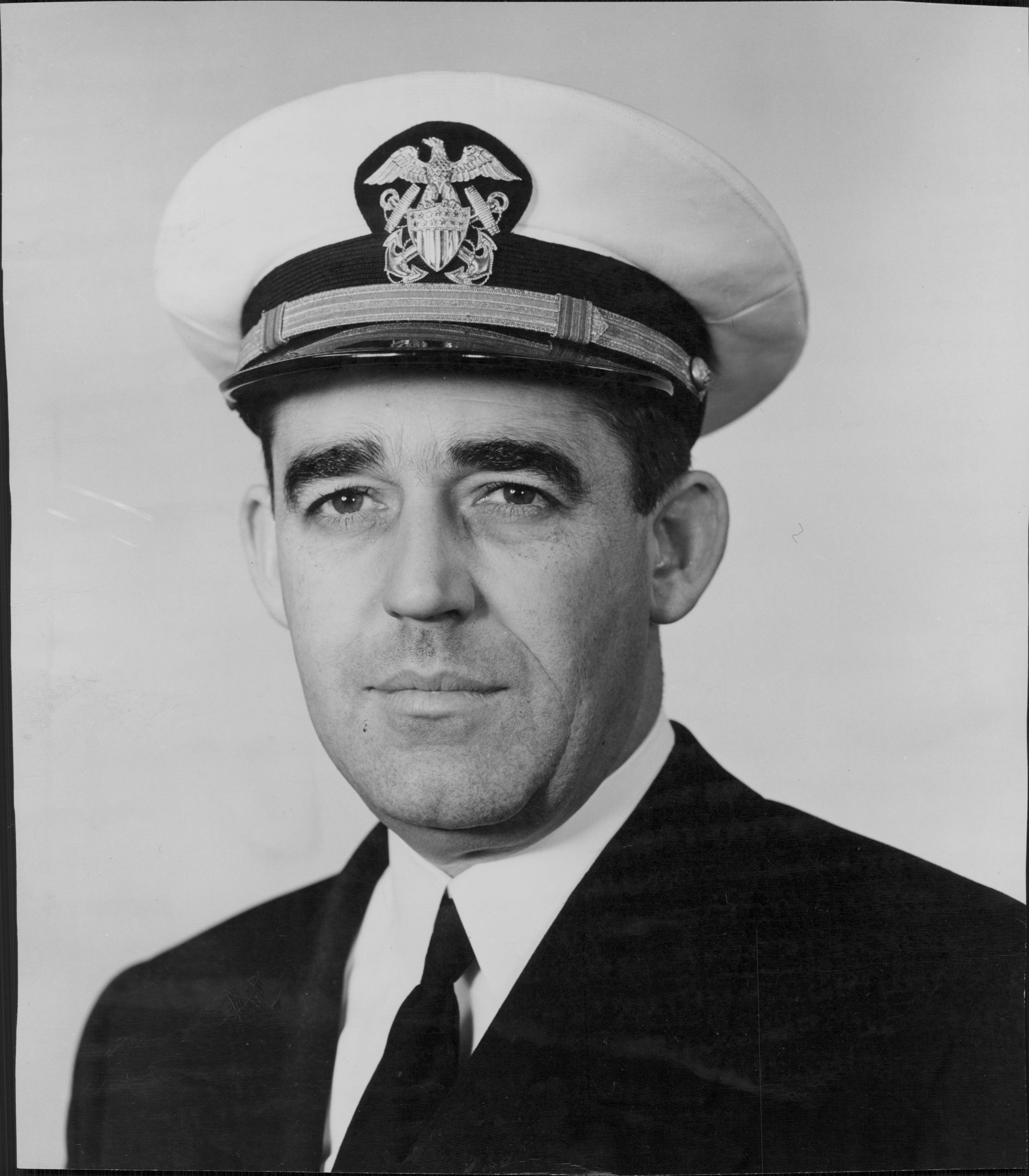
Lieutenant commander James L. Garard wearing the standard combination cover (without embellishments or "scrambled eggs") as per regulations.

While lieutenant commander is the U.S. Navy's first commissioned officer rank to be selected by a board, lieutenant commanders have a long tradition of being considered junior officers due to their origin as "lieutenant, commanding". This can be seen visibly as lieutenant commanders do not wear the headgear embellishment (colloquially known as "scrambled eggs") on their combination covers.

The U.S. Coast Guard used its own rank system until World War I. In 1916, discontent grew among Coast Guard captains: By law, they ranked below a lieutenant commander in the U.S. Navy despite similar roles and duties. Pursuant to the Appropriations Act of 1918, the Coast Guard adopted the U.S. Navy rank structure to prevent disagreements over seniority.

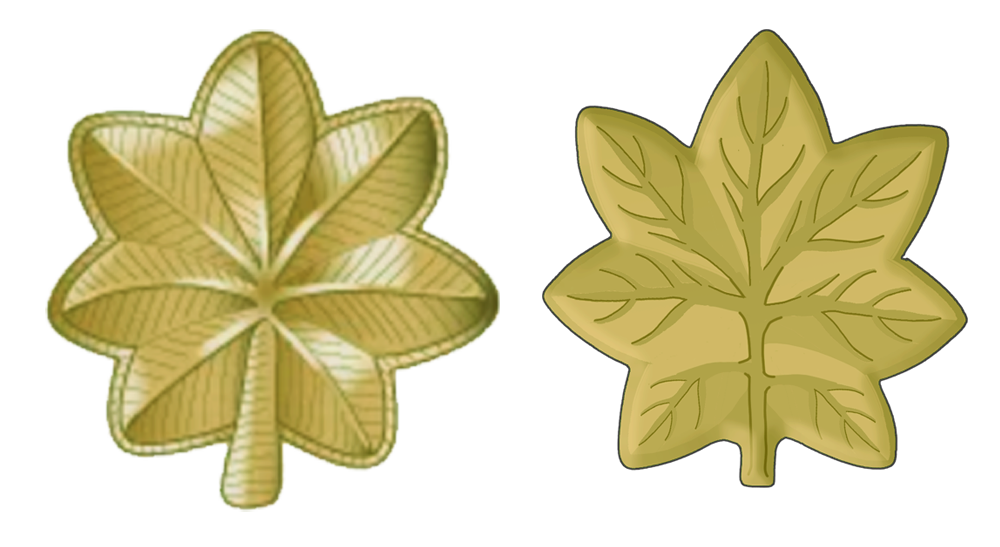
Insignia of an Army Major on left and Navy LCDR on the right

There are two insignia used by lieutenant commanders. On service khakis and all working uniforms, lieutenant commanders wear a gold oak leaf collar device, similar to the ones worn by majors in the United States Air Force/United States Space Force and United States Army, and identical to that worn by majors in the United States Marine Corps. The Army and US Air & Space Forces oak leaf is a stylized rounded gold leaf that does not represent any individual tree. The naval services version is styled similar to a southern live oak leaf grown in the Naval Live Oaks Reservation in the 19th Century.

In all dress uniforms, they wear sleeve braid or shoulder boards bearing a single gold quarter-inch stripe between two gold half-inch strips (nominal size). In the case of officers of the U.S. Navy, above or inboard of the stripes, they wear their specialty insignia, notably a star for officers of the line, crossed oak leaves for Civil Engineer Corps.

Insignia of lieutenant commanders in different uniformed services in the United States

United States Navy

United States Coast Guard

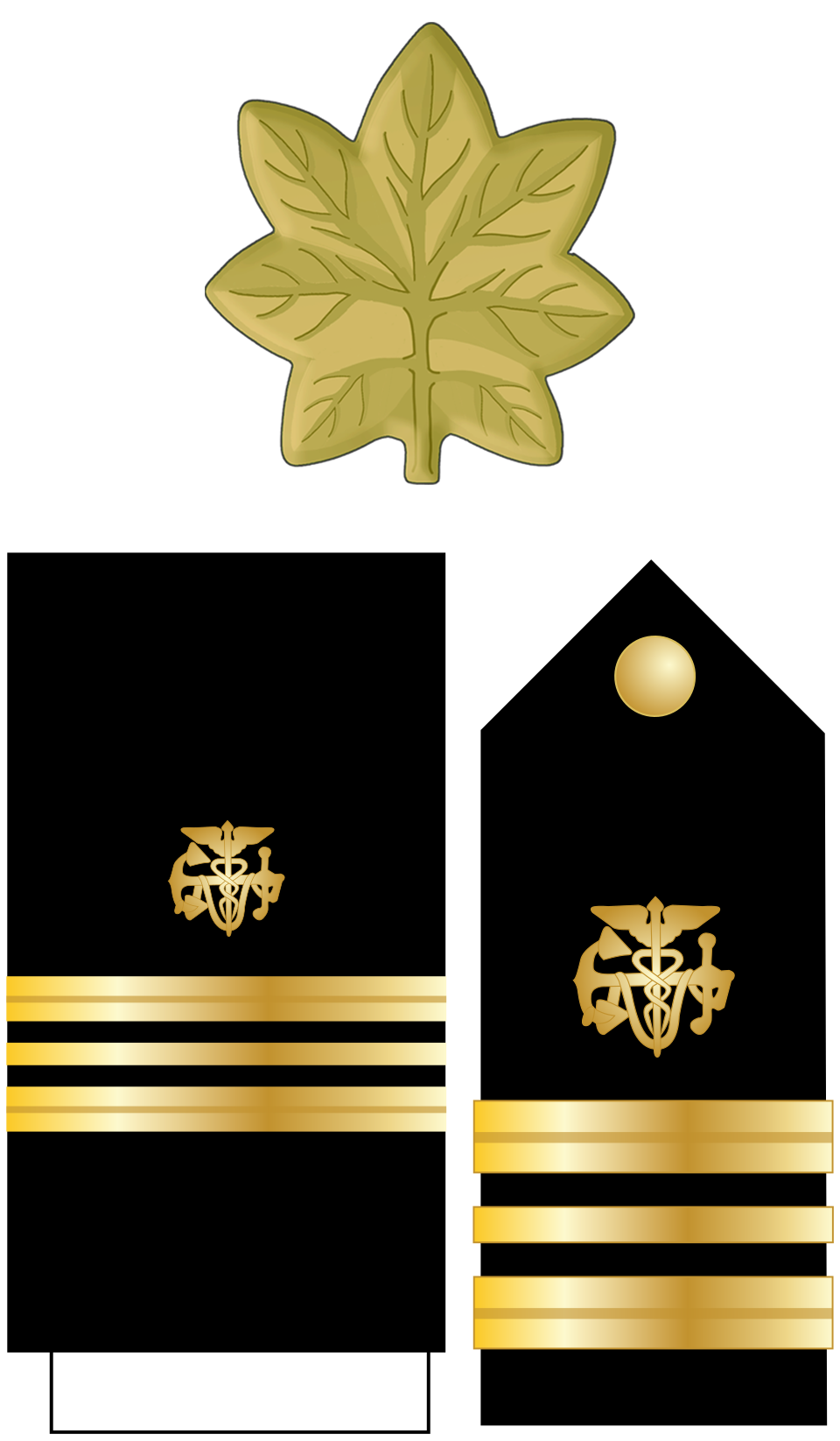
United States Public Health Service Commissioned Corps

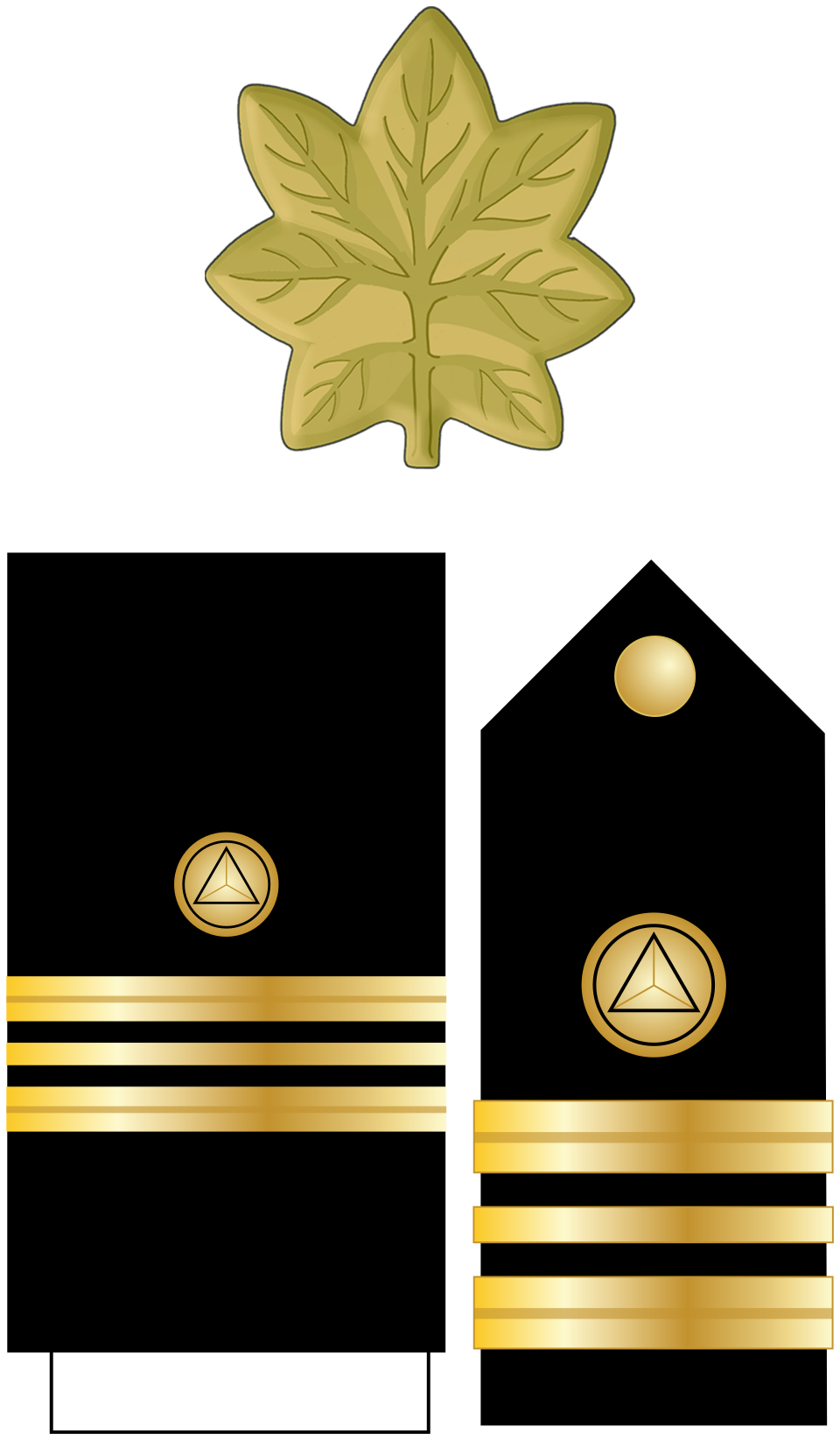
National Oceanic and Atmospheric Administration Commissioned Officer Corps

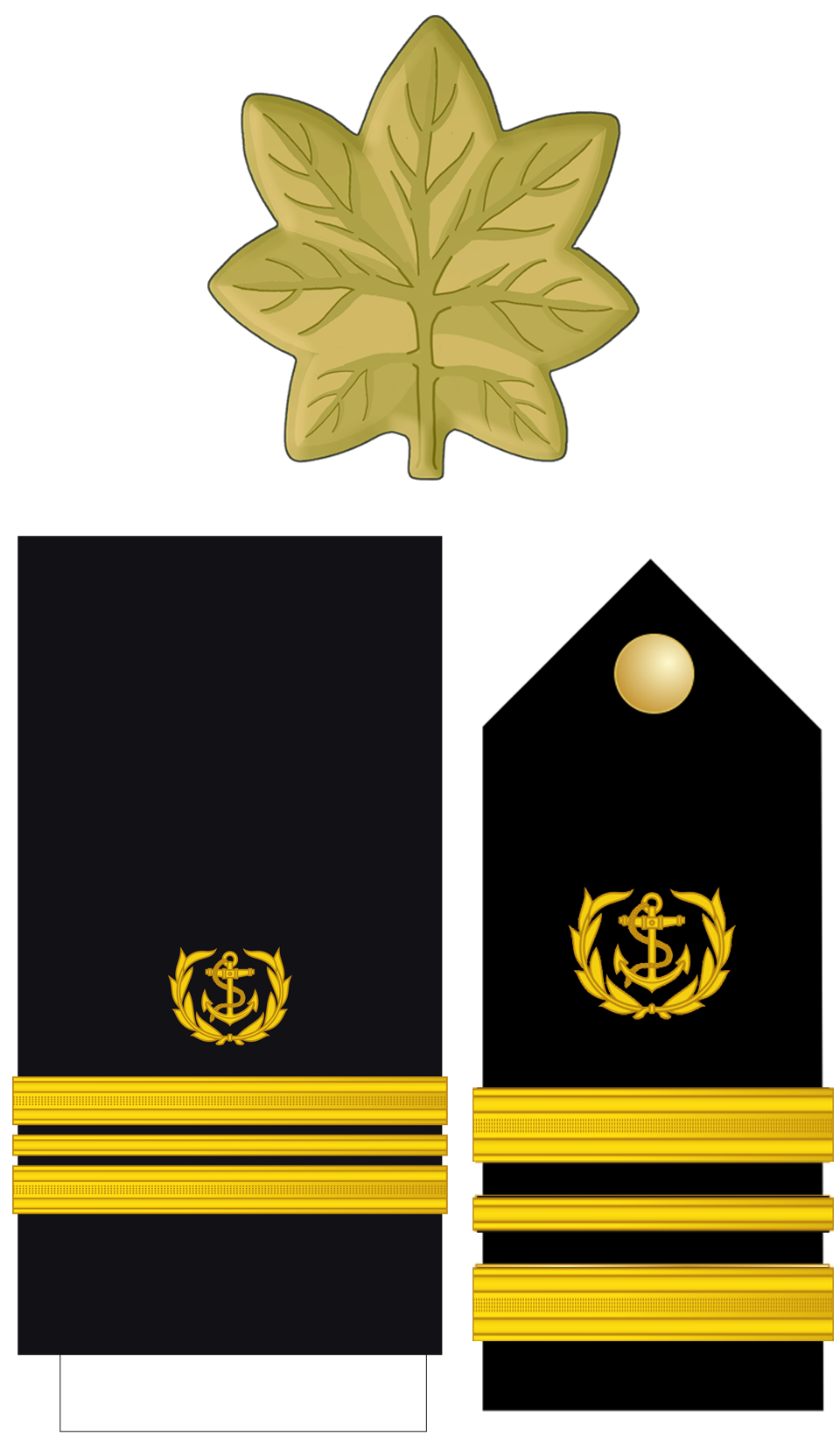
United States Maritime Service a voluntary training organization of the US Transportation Department

== See also ==
- U.S. Navy officer rank insignia
