= Ollinger-Cobb House =

Historic house in Florida, United States

- U.S. National Register of Historic Places
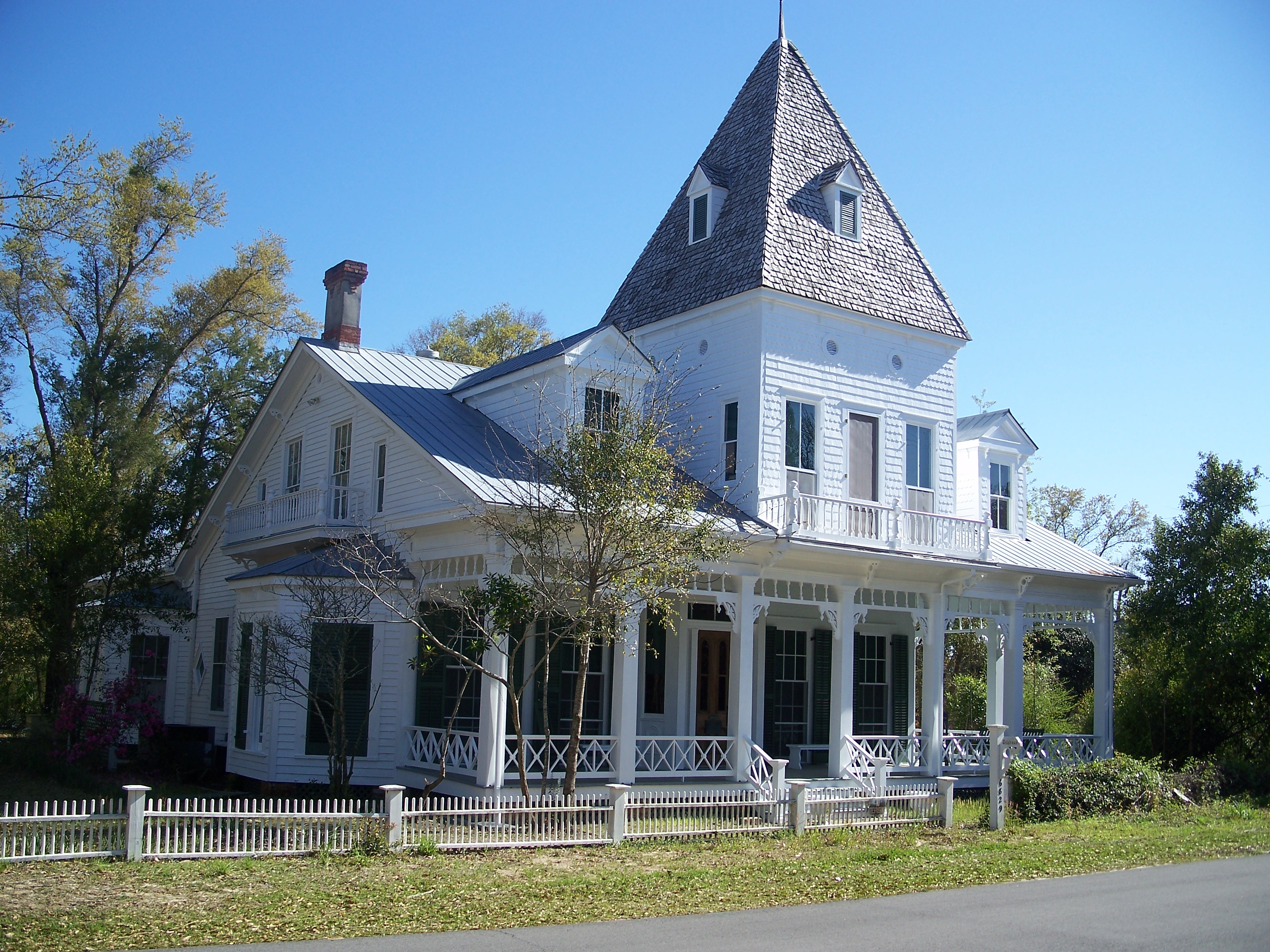

- Location within Florida Location within the United States
- Location: Milton, Florida
- Coordinates: 30°37′9″N 87°2′16″W
- NRHP reference No.: 83001440
- Added to NRHP: January 11, 1983

The Ollinger-Cobb House is a historic residential building located at 302 Pine Street in Milton, Santa Rosa County, Florida. On January 11, 1983, it was added to the U.S. National Register of Historic Places.

In 1989, the house was listed in A Guide to Florida's Historic Architecture, published by the University of Florida Press.

== History ==
The home was built in 1871 by Joseph Ollinger, a Luxembourgish shipbuilder who also owned a grocery store and saloon. The appearance of the original home is unknown, as it underwent large-scale renovations in 1896. It is theorized to have originally resembled the St. Mary's Episcopal Church Rectory.

After Ollinger sold the house in 1907, it passed through three different owners, seemingly of the same family. It was bought by F.H. Cobb, a lumber grader who owned the home for six decades.
