= Butcherpen Mound =

- Location within Florida today
- 30°21′58.21″N 87°9′16.06″W
- Cultures: Weeden Island culture
- Location: Gulf Breeze, Florida, Santa Rosa County, Florida, USA
- Region: Santa Rosa County, Florida
- Butcherpen Mound
- U.S. National Register of Historic Places
- MPS: Archeological Properties of the Naval Live Oaks Reservation MPS
- NRHP reference No.: 98001165
- Added to NRHP: 28 September 1998

The Butcherpen Mound (8SR29) is a prehistoric archaeological site associated with the Weeden Island culture, located near Gulf Breeze, in the U.S. state of Florida. Carbon dating at the site has dated it to roughly 1005 CE. On September 28, 1998, it was added to the U.S. National Register of Historic Places.
