= Big Heart West =

- U.S. National Register of Historic Places
- Location within Florida Location within the United States
- Location: Gulf Breeze, Florida
- Coordinates: 30.36°N 87.16°W
- MPS: Archeological Properties of the Naval Live Oaks Reservation MPS
- NRHP reference No.: 98001167
- Added to NRHP: September 28, 1998

The Big Heart West is an archaeological site near Gulf Breeze, Florida. On September 28, 1998, it was added to the U.S. National Register of Historic Places.
