= Thomas Creek Archeological District =

Historic district in Florida, United States

- U.S. National Register of Historic Places
- U.S. Historic district
- Location within Florida Location within the United States
- Location: Santa Rosa County, Florida
- Nearest city: Chum I cola
- Coordinates: 30°45′55″N 87°12′54″W
- Area: 78,080 acres (316.0 km^{2})
- NRHP reference No.: 85003482
- Added to NRHP: November 4, 1985

The Thomas Creek Archeological District is a U.S. historic district located east of Chumuckla, Florida. On November 4, 1985, it was added to the U.S. National Register of Historic Places.
