= Tiger Point, Florida =

- Unincorporated community
- Location within Florida Location within the United States
- Coordinates: 30°22′43″N 87°03′20″W
- Country: United States
- State: Florida
- County: Santa Rosa

Area
  - Total: 3.663 sq mi (9.49 km^{2})
  - Land: 1.405 sq mi (3.64 km^{2})
  - Water: 2.258 sq mi (5.85 km^{2})
- Elevation: 3 ft (0.91 m)

Population (2020)
  - Total: 3,342
  - Density: 2,379/sq mi (918.4/km^{2})
- Time zone: UTC-6 (Central (CST))
  - Summer (DST): UTC-5 (CDT)
- ZIP code: 32563
- Area code: 850
- GNIS feature ID: 1985711

Tiger Point is a census-designated place in Santa Rosa County, Florida. It is considered to be a part of Gulf Breeze. The population was 3,342 at the 2020 census, up from 3,090 at the 2010 census. It is part of the Pensacola—Ferry Pass—Brent, Florida Metropolitan Statistical Area.

== Geography ==
According to the U.S. Census Bureau, the community has an area of 3.663 square miles (9.49 km^{2}); 1.405 square miles (3.64 km^{2}) of its area is land, and 2.258 square miles (5.85 km^{2}) is water.

== Demographics ==
Tiger Point first appeared as a census designated place in the 2010 U.S. census.

=== 2020 census ===
As of the 2020 census, Tiger Point had a population of 3,342. The median age was 46.3 years. 23.1% of residents were under the age of 18 and 24.7% of residents were 65 years of age or older. For every 100 females there were 93.5 males, and for every 100 females age 18 and over there were 86.5 males age 18 and over.

100.0% of residents lived in urban areas, while 0.0% lived in rural areas.

There were 1,345 households in Tiger Point, of which 32.0% had children under the age of 18 living in them. Of all households, 59.6% were married-couple households, 10.3% were households with a male householder and no spouse or partner present, and 24.8% were households with a female householder and no spouse or partner present. About 23.8% of all households were made up of individuals and 13.8% had someone living alone who was 65 years of age or older.

There were 1,422 housing units, of which 5.4% were vacant. The homeowner vacancy rate was 1.3% and the rental vacancy rate was 8.8%.

Racial composition as of the 2020 census
Race	Number	Percent
White	2,927	87.6%
Black or African American	36	1.1%
American Indian and Alaska Native	9	0.3%
Asian	99	3.0%
Native Hawaiian and Other Pacific Islander	6	0.2%
Some other race	51	1.5%
Two or more races	214	6.4%
Hispanic or Latino (of any race)	186	5.6%
