= St. Mary's Episcopal Church and Rectory (Milton, Florida) =

Historic church in Florida, United States

- St. Mary's Episcopal; Church and Rectory
- U.S. National Register of Historic Places
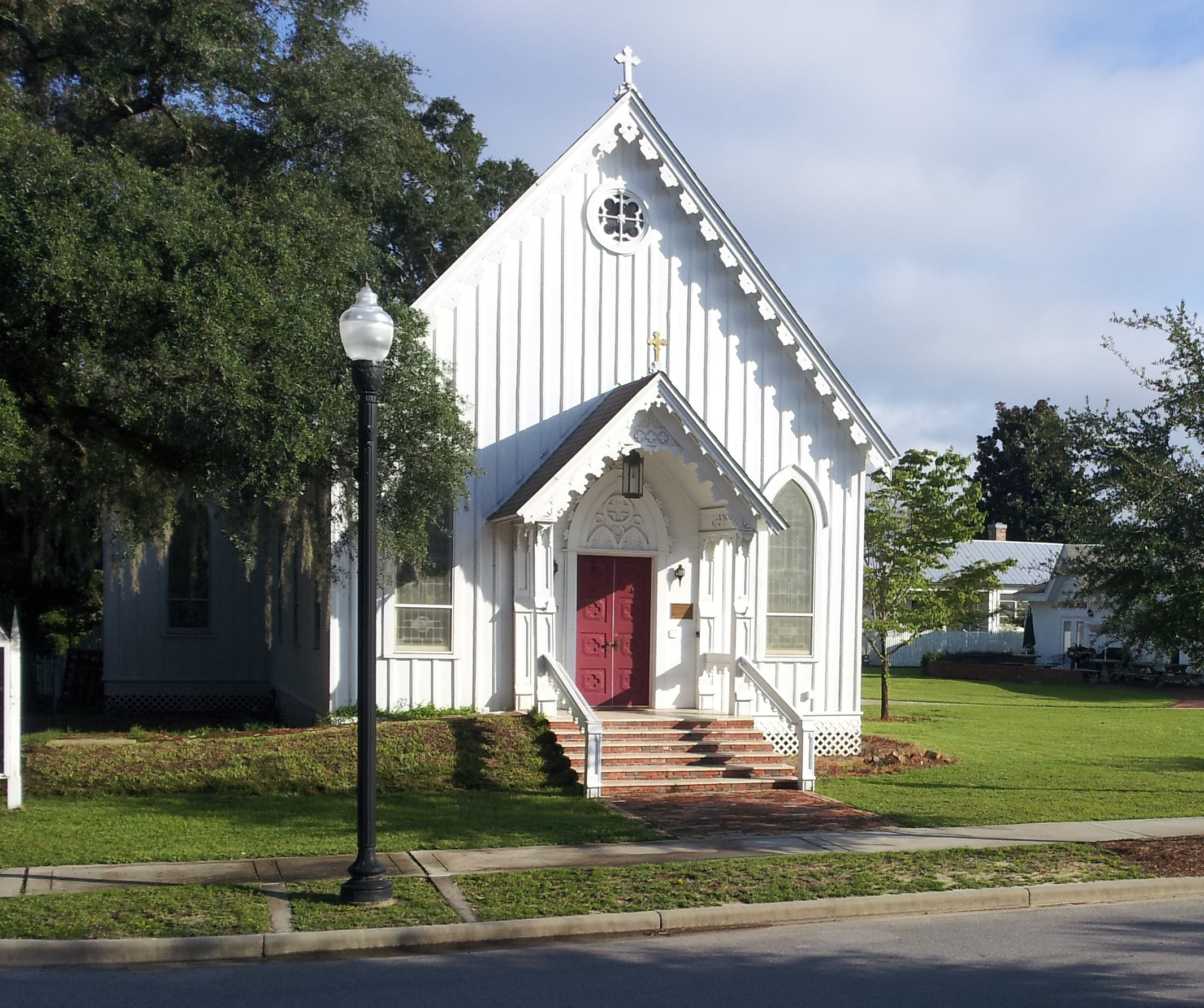

- Location within Florida Location within the United States
- Location: 6849 Oak Street; Milton, Florida
- Coordinates: 30°37′16″N 87°2′10″W
- Built: 1875-1888
- Architectural style: Gothic Revival
- NRHP reference No.: 82002380
- Added to NRHP: May 6, 1982

St. Mary's Church is a parish in the Diocese of the Central Gulf Coast of the Episcopal Church based in Milton, Florida. It is noted for its historic Carpenter Gothic-style church and its adjacent rectory, also known as the McDougall House, located at 300 Oak Street, now 6841 Oak Street. On May 6, 1982, it was added to the U.S. National Register of Historic Places as "St. Mary's Episcopal Church and Rectory."

The congregation first met for worship on August 4, 1867. The current church opened for services in 1878. As with other Carpenter Gothic churches, features of the Gothic Revival style have been executed in wood, such as its lancet windows, decorative bargeboards, and finials.

In 1989, St. Mary's Episcopal Church was listed in A Guide to Florida's Historic Architecture, published by the University of Florida Press. The listing quotes from Frank Lloyd Wright's book, The Aesthetics of American Architecture, in which he wrote: "Saint Mary's is a jewel created in the purest tradition of the Gothic Revival. It survives today with its pure lines intact, its muted colors untouched. Purity, it is without a blemish."

The church celebrated its sesquicentennial anniversary in 2017.

== History ==
St. Mary's Episcopal Church was founded in 1867 by a group led by Dr. Charles McDougall. The first services were held in the Milton Masonic Lodge. James Jarett served briefly as the rector before he was replaced by McDougall, who served for over thirty years until his death in 1916.

The church building was constructed by Alex Zelius, a sailor who fell ill while stationed in Milton. Zelius used hints of shipbuilding in the design for St. Mary's.

== See also ==
- List of Registered Historic Places in Santa Rosa County, Florida https://stmarysmilton.wixsite.com/church

== Gallery ==
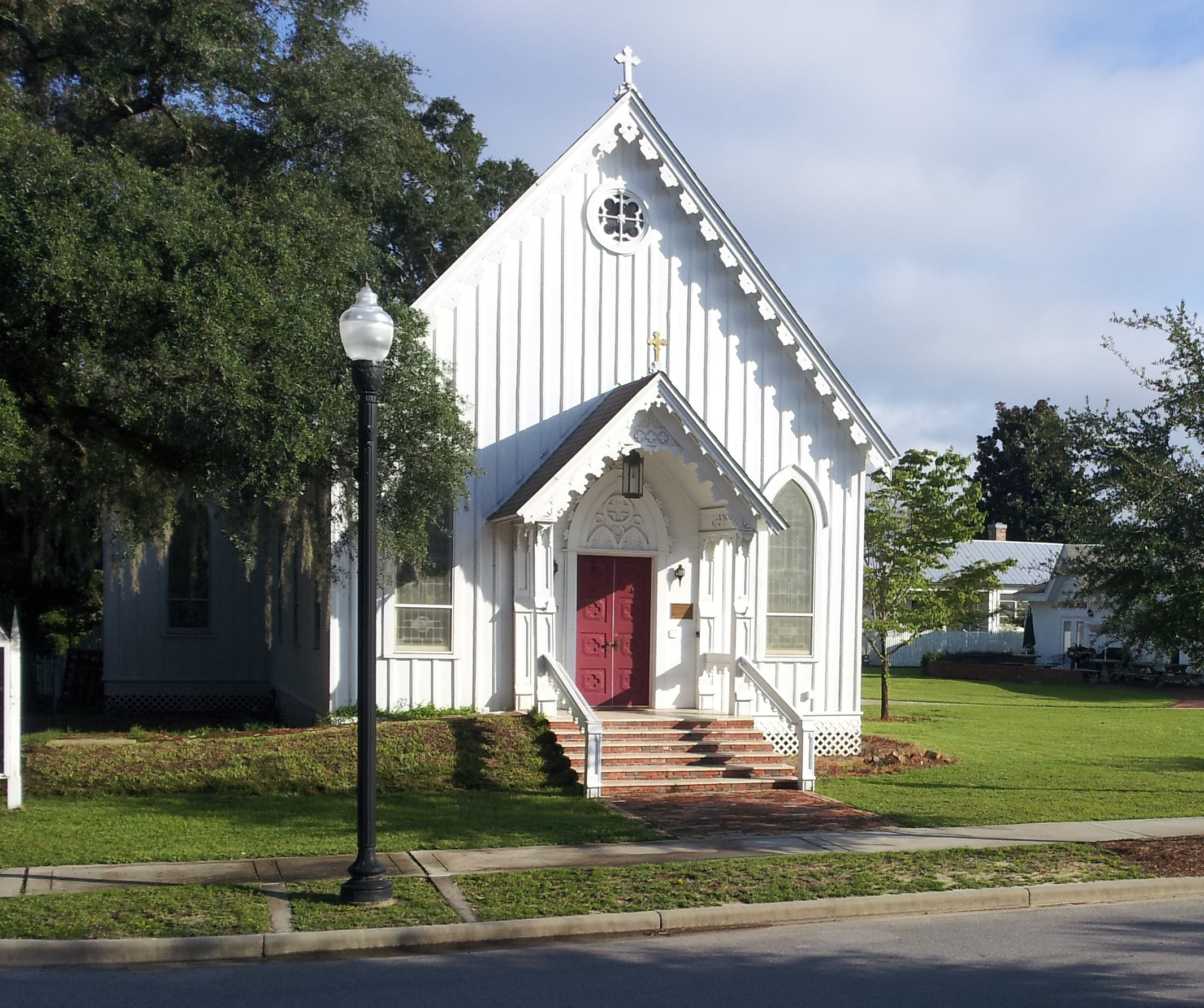

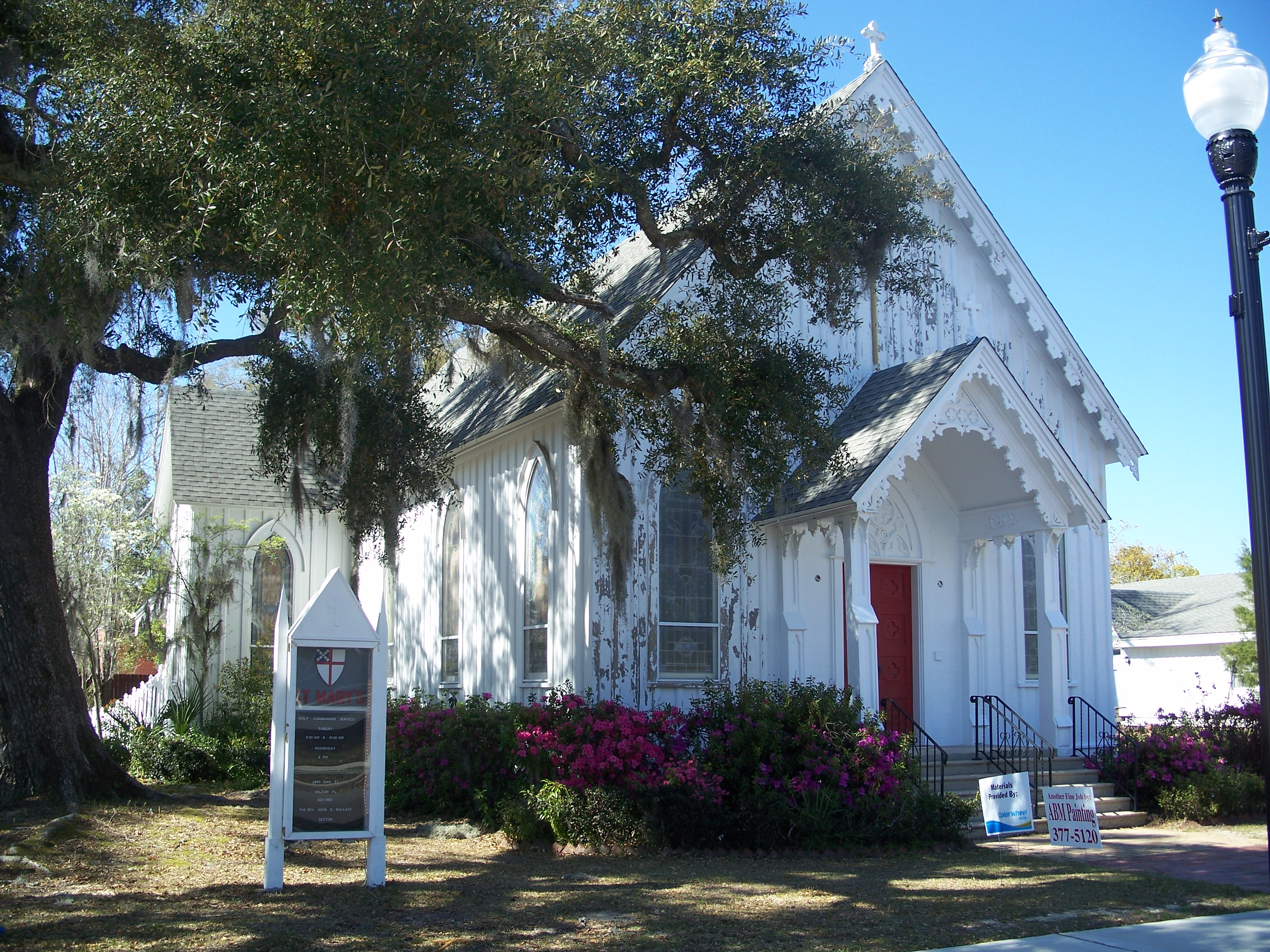

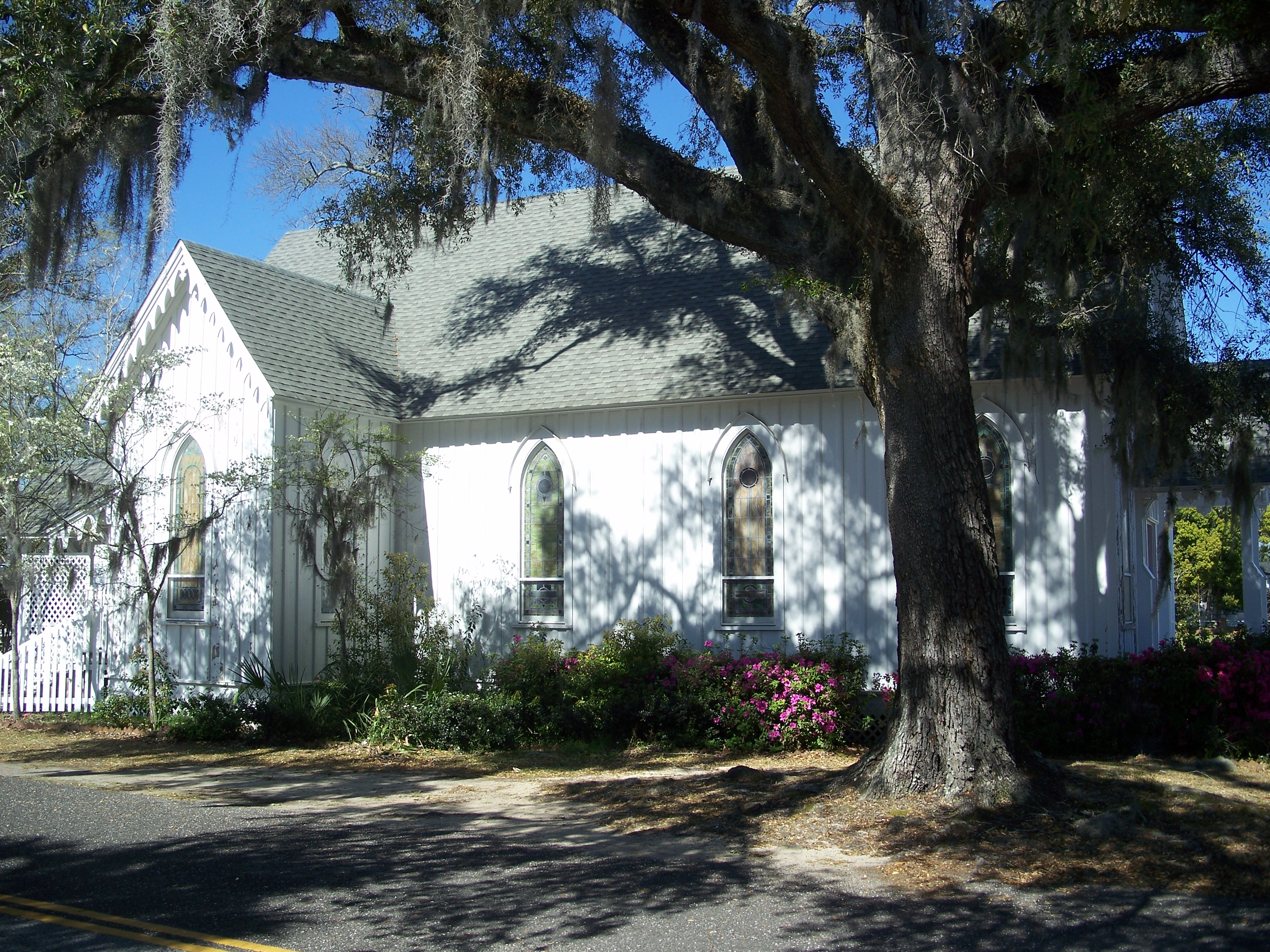

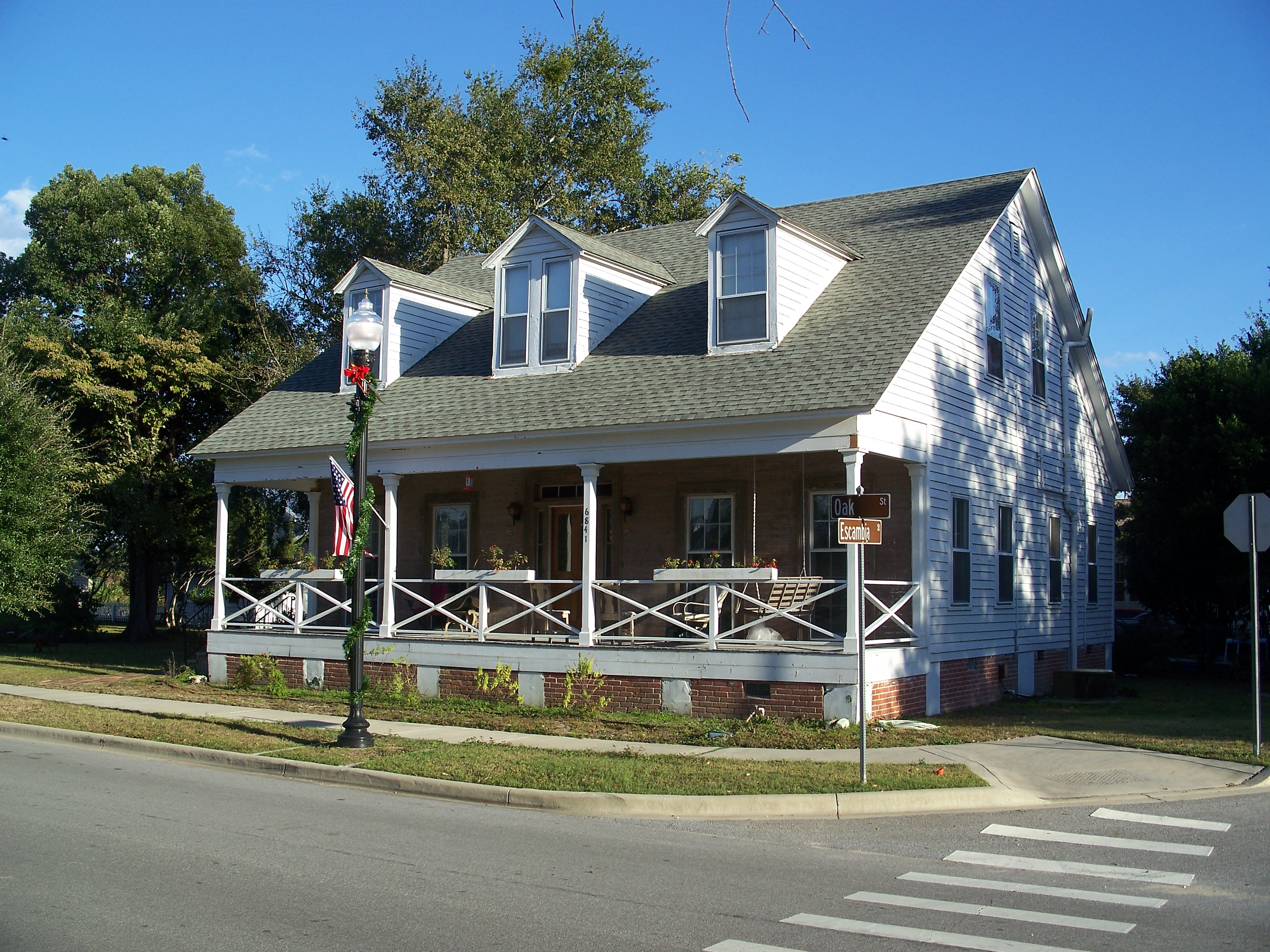
Rectory
