= Bagdad, Florida =

- CDP
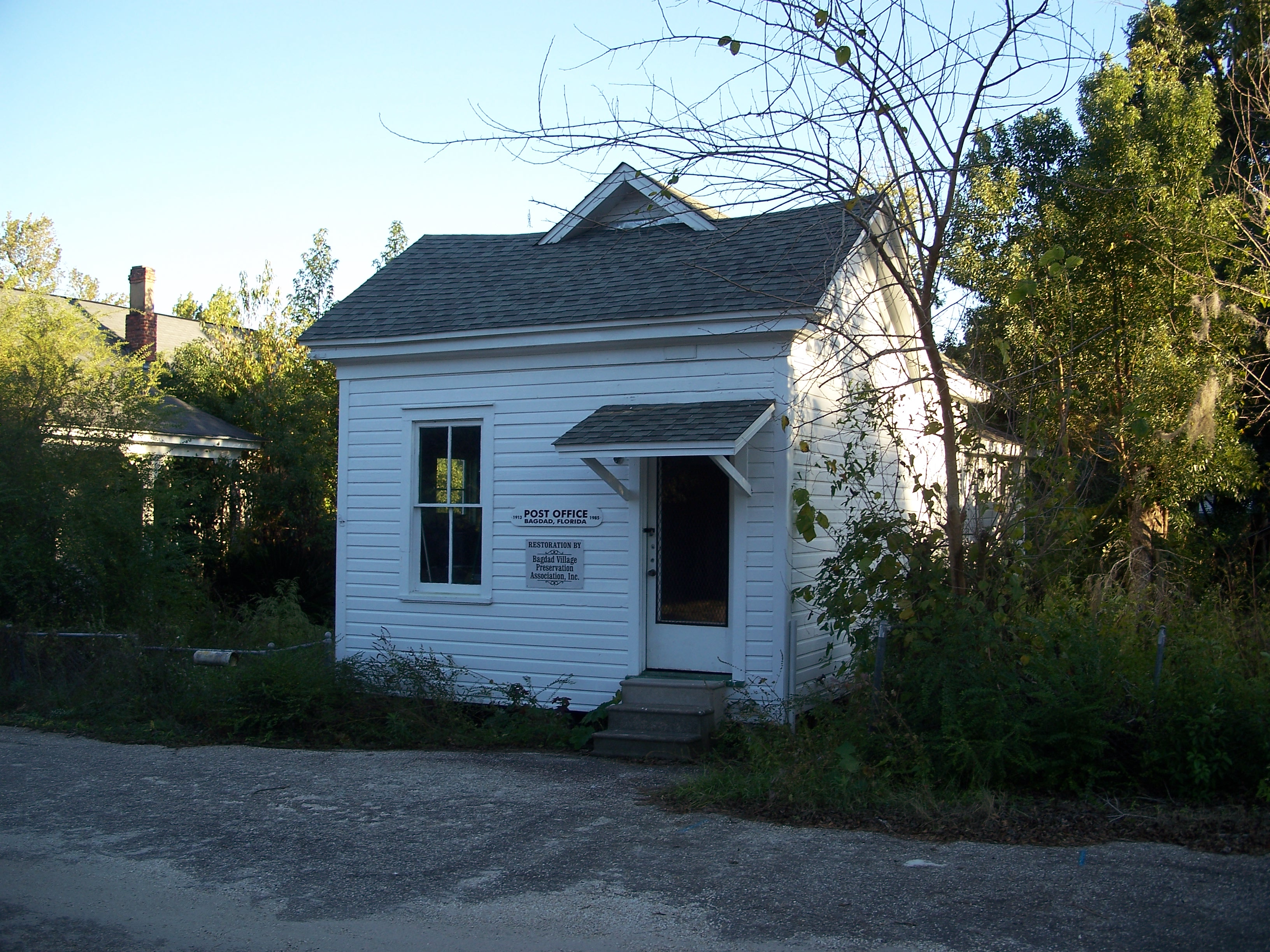
- Old post office in Bagdad Village Historic District

- Location of Bagdad in Santa Rosa County, Florida.
- Coordinates: 30°34′57″N 87°02′41″W
- Country: United States
- State: Florida
- County: Santa Rosa

Area
  - Total: 6.47 sq mi (16.75 km^{2})
  - Land: 6.34 sq mi (16.43 km^{2})
  - Water: 0.12 sq mi (0.32 km^{2})
- Elevation: 66 ft (20 m)

Population (2020)
  - Total: 4,467
  - Density: 704.2/sq mi (271.88/km^{2})
- Time zone: UTC-6 (Central (CST))
  - Summer (DST): UTC-5 (CDT)
- ZIP code: 32530
- Area code: 850
- FIPS code: 12-02925
- GNIS feature ID: 2402659

Bagdad is a census-designated place (CDP) in Santa Rosa County, Florida, United States. The population was 4,467 at the 2020 census, up from 3,761 at the 2010 census. It is part of the Pensacola–Ferry Pass–Brent, Florida Metropolitan Statistical Area.

== History ==
Bagdad had its start in 1840, when a settler established a sawmill there. The town was named after Baghdad, Iraq by lumber businessman Joseph Forsyth, A post office called Bagdad has been in operation since 1887.

== Geography ==
According to the United States Census Bureau, the CDP has a total area of 4.2 square miles (11 km^{2}), of which 3.5 square miles (9.1 km^{2}) is land and 0.7 square miles (1.8 km^{2}) (16.98%) is water.

The area was hit by Hurricane Dennis in 2005.

== Demographics ==
Historical population
| Census | Pop. | Note | %± |
|---|---|---|---|
| 1980 | 1,479 | | — |
| 1990 | 1,457 | | −1.5% |
| 2000 | 1,490 | | 2.3% |
| 2010 | 3,761 | | 152.4% |
| 2020 | 4,467 | | 18.8% |

=== 2020 census ===
As of the 2020 census, Bagdad had a population of 4,467. The median age was 40.4 years. 22.7% of residents were under the age of 18 and 20.6% of residents were 65 years of age or older. For every 100 females there were 93.1 males, and for every 100 females age 18 and over there were 92.2 males age 18 and over.

96.2% of residents lived in urban areas, while 3.8% lived in rural areas.

There were 1,756 households in Bagdad, of which 32.9% had children under the age of 18 living in them. Of all households, 52.6% were married-couple households, 14.9% were households with a male householder and no spouse or partner present, and 24.4% were households with a female householder and no spouse or partner present. About 24.3% of all households were made up of individuals and 12.2% had someone living alone who was 65 years of age or older.

There were 1,885 housing units, of which 6.8% were vacant. The homeowner vacancy rate was 1.6% and the rental vacancy rate was 5.3%.

Racial composition as of the 2020 census
| Race | Number | Percent |
|---|---|---|
| White | 3,583 | 80.2% |
| Black or African American | 312 | 7.0% |
| American Indian and Alaska Native | 43 | 1.0% |
| Asian | 61 | 1.4% |
| Native Hawaiian and Other Pacific Islander | 3 | 0.1% |
| Some other race | 61 | 1.4% |
| Two or more races | 404 | 9.0% |
| Hispanic or Latino (of any race) | 195 | 4.4% |

=== 2000 census ===
As of the 2000 census there were 1,490 people, 587 households, and 406 families residing in the CDP. The population density was 423.3 inhabitants per square mile (163.4/km^{2}). There were 659 housing units at an average density of 187.2 units per square mile (72.3 units/km^{2}). The racial makeup of the CDP was 80.00% White, 13.62% African American, 1.21% Native American, 0.40% Asian, 0.07% Pacific Islander, 0.47% from other races, and 4.23% from two or more races. Hispanic or Latino of any race made up 1.88% of the population.

There were 587 households, out of which 28.6% had children under the age of 18 living with them, 50.3% were married couples living together, 14.5% had a female householder with no husband present, and 30.7% were non-families. 26.1% of all households were made up of individuals, and 11.2% had someone living alone who was 65 years of age or older. The average household size was 2.50, and the average family size was 2.93.

In the CDP, the population was spread out, with 23.8% under the age of 18, 7.7% from 18 to 24, 27.9% from 25 to 44, 24.4% from 45 to 64, and 16.2% who were 65 years of age or older. The median age was 39 years. For every 100 females, there were 94.8 males. For every 100 females age 18 and over, there were 89.8 males.

The median income for a household in the CDP was $32,313, and the median income for a family was $46,786. Males had a median income of $30,104 versus $22,604 for females. The per capita income for the CDP was $15,980. About 13.5% of families and 22.5% of the population were below the poverty line, including 36.7% of those under age 18 and 12.6% of those age 65 or over.

== Notable people ==
- Bubba Watson, professional golfer, winner of the Masters Tournament in 2012 and 2014.
