= Bagdad Village Historic District =

Historic district in Florida, United States

- U.S. National Register of Historic Places
- U.S. Historic district
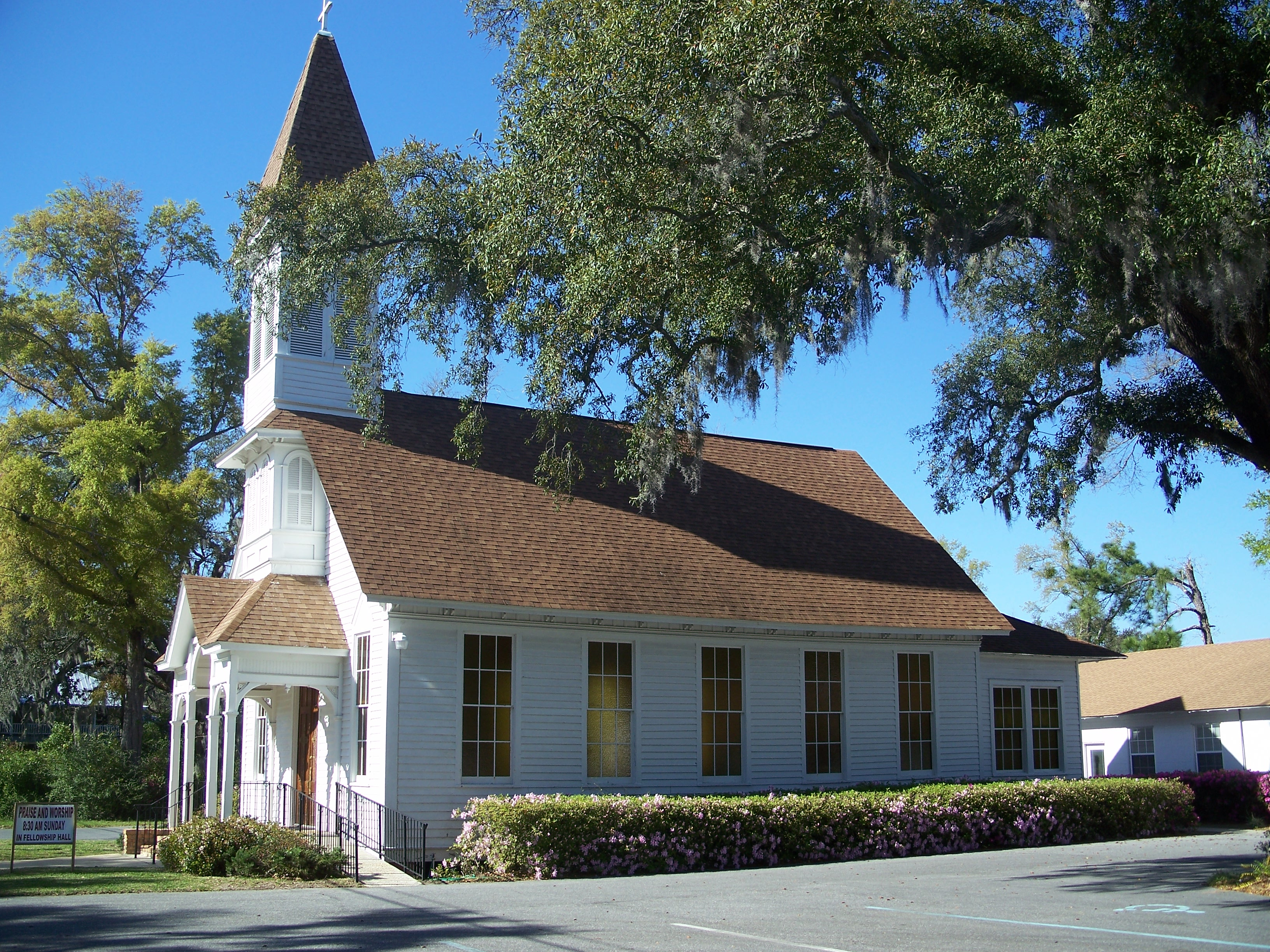
- First United Methodist Church, in the district

- Location within Florida Location within the United States
- Location: Bagdad, Florida
- Coordinates: 30°36′2″N 87°1′56″W
- Area: 1,400 acres (5.7 km^{2})
- NRHP reference No.: 87001991
- Added to NRHP: December 8, 1987

The Bagdad Village Historic District is a U.S. historic district (designated as such on December 8, 1987) located in Bagdad, Florida. The district is bounded by Main, Water, & Oak Streets, Cobb & Woodville Roads, Cemetery, Pooley, & School Streets. It contains 143 historic buildings.
