= Naval Live Oaks Cemetery =

Ancient burial site in Santa Rosa County, Florida

- Location within Florida Location within the United States
- 30°21′37.94″N 87°11′34.76″W
- Cultures: Pensacola culture
- Location: Gulf Breeze, Florida, Santa Rosa County, Florida, United States
- Region: Santa Rosa County, Florida

Site notes
- Architectural style: Number of temples:
- Naval Live Oaks Cemetery
- U.S. National Register of Historic Places
- MPS: Archeological Properties of the Naval Live Oaks Reservation MPS
- NRHP reference No.: 98001166
- Added to NRHP: September 28, 1998

The Naval Live Oaks Cemetery (also known as the Head Site and 8SR36) is a prehistoric cemetery associated with the Pensacola culture, a regional variant of the Mississippian culture. It is located near Gulf Breeze, Florida. On September 28, 1998, it was added to the U.S. National Register of Historic Places.
