= Woodlawn Beach, Florida =

- Unincorporated community Census designated place
- Location of Woodlawn Beach, Santa Rosa County, Florida
- Coordinates: 30°23′18″N 86°59′27″W
- Country: United States
- State: Florida
- County: Santa Rosa County, Florida
- Elevation: 13 ft (4.0 m)

Population (2020)
  - Total: 2,741
- Time zone: UTC-6 (Central (CST))
  - Summer (DST): UTC-5 (CDT)
- Area code: 850
- GNIS feature ID: 2583363

Woodlawn Beach is a census-designated place on the Santa Rosa Sound in Santa Rosa County, Florida, United States surrounded by the older Midway CDP. The population was 2,741 at the 2020 census, and it is part of the Pensacola—Ferry Pass—Brent, Florida Metropolitan Statistical Area.

Woodlawn Beach lies south of U.S. Highway 98 between Nantahala Beach Road (CR 191C) and Conover Cove. The area includes the Woodlawn Beach Middle School, Woodlawn Beach Boat Ramp, and Gulf Breeze Zoo. Citizens of Woodlawn Beach often consider themselves to be part of the larger communities of Navarre or Gulf Breeze. The ZIP Code for Woodlawn Beach is 32563.

== Demographics ==
Woodlawn Beach first appeared as a census designated place in the 2010 U.S. census.

=== 2020 census ===
As of the 2020 census, Woodlawn Beach had a population of 2,741. The median age was 41.3 years. 23.5% of residents were under the age of 18 and 16.3% of residents were 65 years of age or older. For every 100 females there were 101.1 males, and for every 100 females age 18 and over there were 98.7 males age 18 and over.

100.0% of residents lived in urban areas, while 0.0% lived in rural areas.

There were 1,022 households in Woodlawn Beach, of which 35.5% had children under the age of 18 living in them. Of all households, 66.6% were married-couple households, 12.9% were households with a male householder and no spouse or partner present, and 15.1% were households with a female householder and no spouse or partner present. About 17.7% of all households were made up of individuals and 7.8% had someone living alone who was 65 years of age or older.

There were 1,087 housing units, of which 6.0% were vacant. The homeowner vacancy rate was 1.0% and the rental vacancy rate was 4.6%.

Racial composition as of the 2020 census
Race	Number	Percent
White	2,247	82.0%
Black or African American	89	3.2%
American Indian and Alaska Native	9	0.3%
Asian	76	2.8%
Native Hawaiian and Other Pacific Islander	2	0.1%
Some other race	43	1.6%
Two or more races	275	10.0%
Hispanic or Latino (of any race)	197	7.2%

=== 2010 census ===
As of the 2010 census, the population was 1,785.
