= Third Gulf Breeze =

Archaeological site in Florida, U.S.

- Approximate location within Florida today
- 30°21′58.21″N 87°9′16.06″W
- Cultures: Santa Rosa-Swift Creek culture
- Location: Gulf Breeze, Florida, Santa Rosa County, Florida, United States
- Region: Santa Rosa County, Florida

Site notes
- Architectural style: Number of temples:
- Third Gulf Breeze
- U.S. National Register of Historic Places
- MPS: Archeological Properties of the Naval Live Oaks Reservation MPS
- NRHP reference No.: 98001164
- Added to NRHP: September 28, 1998

The Third Gulf Breeze, (8SR8), is a Santa Rosa-Swift Creek culture archaeological site near Gulf Breeze, Florida, United States. On September 28, 1998, it was added to the U.S. National Register of Historic Places.
