= Chumuckla, Florida =

Census-designated place in Florida, US

Chumuckla is a census-designated place in Santa Rosa County, Florida, United States.

The population of Chumuckla was 1,063 at the 2020 census. It is part of the Pensacola—Ferry Pass—Brent, Florida Metropolitan Statistical Area.

== Demographics ==
Chumuckla first appeared as a census designated place in the 2010 U.S. census.

=== 2020 census ===
As of the 2020 census, Chumuckla had a population of 1,063. The median age was 43.0 years. 23.4% of residents were under the age of 18 and 19.3% of residents were 65 years of age or older. For every 100 females there were 106.4 males, and for every 100 females age 18 and over there were 105.0 males age 18 and over.

0.0% of residents lived in urban areas, while 100.0% lived in rural areas.

There were 412 households in Chumuckla, of which 29.1% had children under the age of 18 living in them. Of all households, 63.3% were married-couple households, 17.7% were households with a male householder and no spouse or partner present, and 14.3% were households with a female householder and no spouse or partner present. About 19.9% of all households were made up of individuals and 11.1% had someone living alone who was 65 years of age or older.

There were 436 housing units, of which 5.5% were vacant. The homeowner vacancy rate was 1.6% and the rental vacancy rate was 0.0%.

Racial composition as of the 2020 census
Race	Number	Percent
White	946	89.0%
Black or African American	9	0.8%
American Indian and Alaska Native	24	2.3%
Asian	5	0.5%
Native Hawaiian and Other Pacific Islander	0	0.0%
Some other race	14	1.3%
Two or more races	65	6.1%
Hispanic or Latino (of any race)	31	2.9%

=== 2010 census ===
As of the 2010 census, Chumuckla had a population of 850.
