= Naval Live Oaks Reservation =

- U.S. National Register of Historic Places
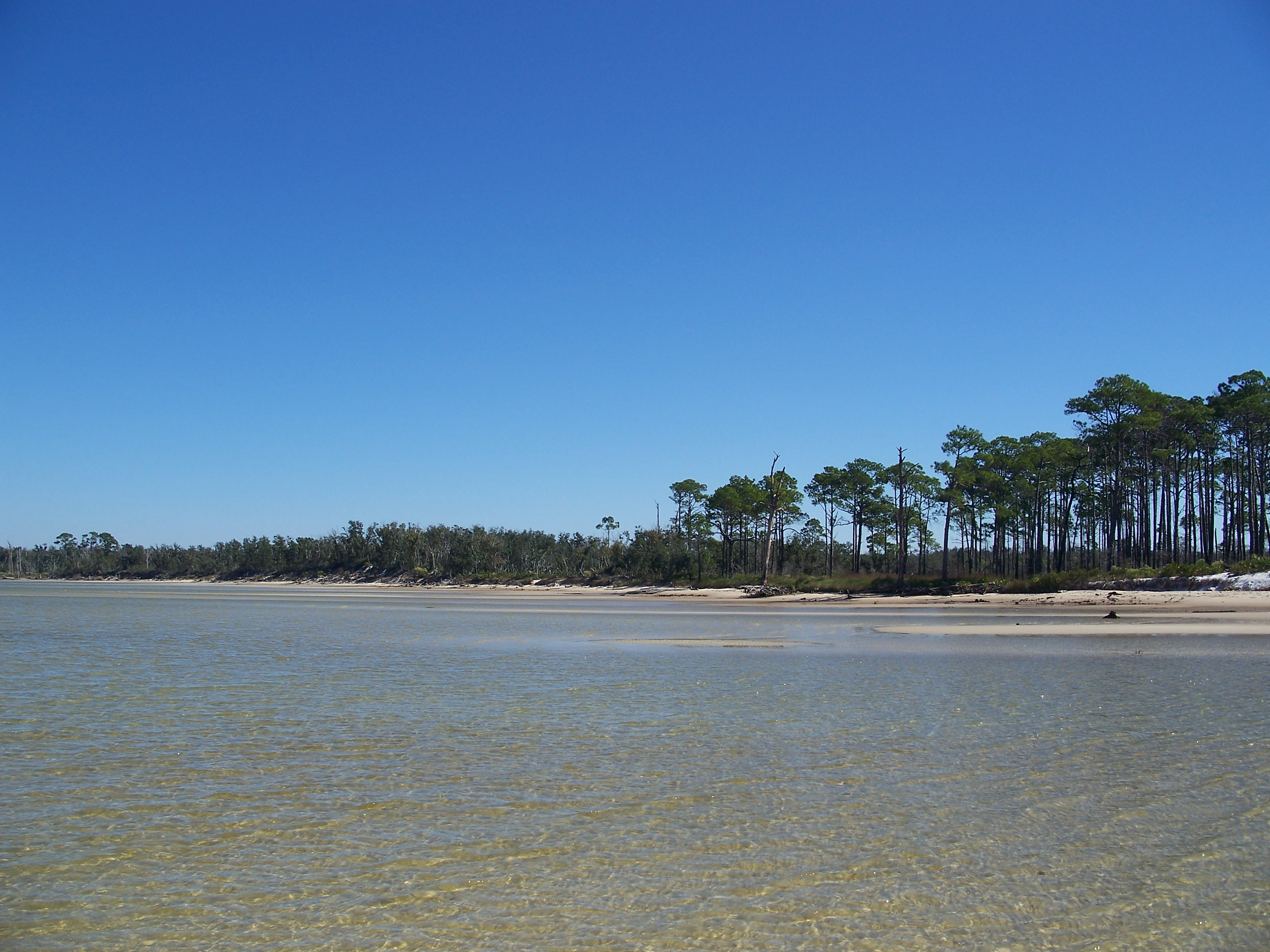

- Location within Florida Location within the United States
- Location: Santa Rosa County, Florida
- Nearest city: Gulf Breeze, Florida
- Coordinates: 30°21′51″N 87°7′51″W
- Area: 1,300 acres (530 ha)
- Visitation: 1,689,400 (2005)
- MPS: Archeological Properties of the Naval Live Oaks Reservation MPS
- NRHP reference No.: 98001169
- Added to NRHP: September 28, 1998

The Naval Live Oaks Reservation (also known as Deer Point Live Oaks Reservation or Deer Point Plantation) is part of the Gulf Islands National Seashore and is near Gulf Breeze, Florida. It was purchased by the U.S. government in 1828 as the first federal tree farm and began operations on January 18, 1829. It serves today as part of the Gulf Islands National Seashore forest community preserved by the National Park Service on January 8, 1971, and added to the U.S. National Register of Historic Places on September 28, 1998.

== History ==
The land which comprises the present Naval Live Oaks Area was purchased with the goal of reserving the valuable live oaks resources for shipbuilders. President John Quincy Adams is credited for the authorization to establish this federal tree farm. Superintendent Henry Marie Brackenridge, who lived on the tree farm, experimented with cultivating the live oak tree. He was perhaps the United States' first federal forester.

The practice of using live oaks in shipbuilding was well-established in America by 1700. Early famous live oak vessels include the USS Hancock (1776), an American revolutionary privateer, the USS Constitution (1797), and the USS Constellation (1797). The USS Constitution saw action against the British during the War of 1812, receiving the nickname "Old Ironsides" due to the strength of its live oak construction. The need for wooden ship timber diminished with the advent of iron and steel warships. However, in 1926 live oak timbers from the Pensacola area were found to be useful in the restoration of the USS Constitution, a National Monument.

Currently, the land comprises over 1,300 acres (5.3 km^{2}) in the Gulf Islands National Seashore and is owned by the Department of the Interior, National Park Service. U.S. Route 98 goes through the southern portion of the land. To the south of Highway 98 is a visitor center for the Gulf Islands National Seashore and some public beach areas. On the north side, there is one picnic area with a trail to a bluff overlooking Pensacola Bay. There are trails throughout the park.

== Gallery ==
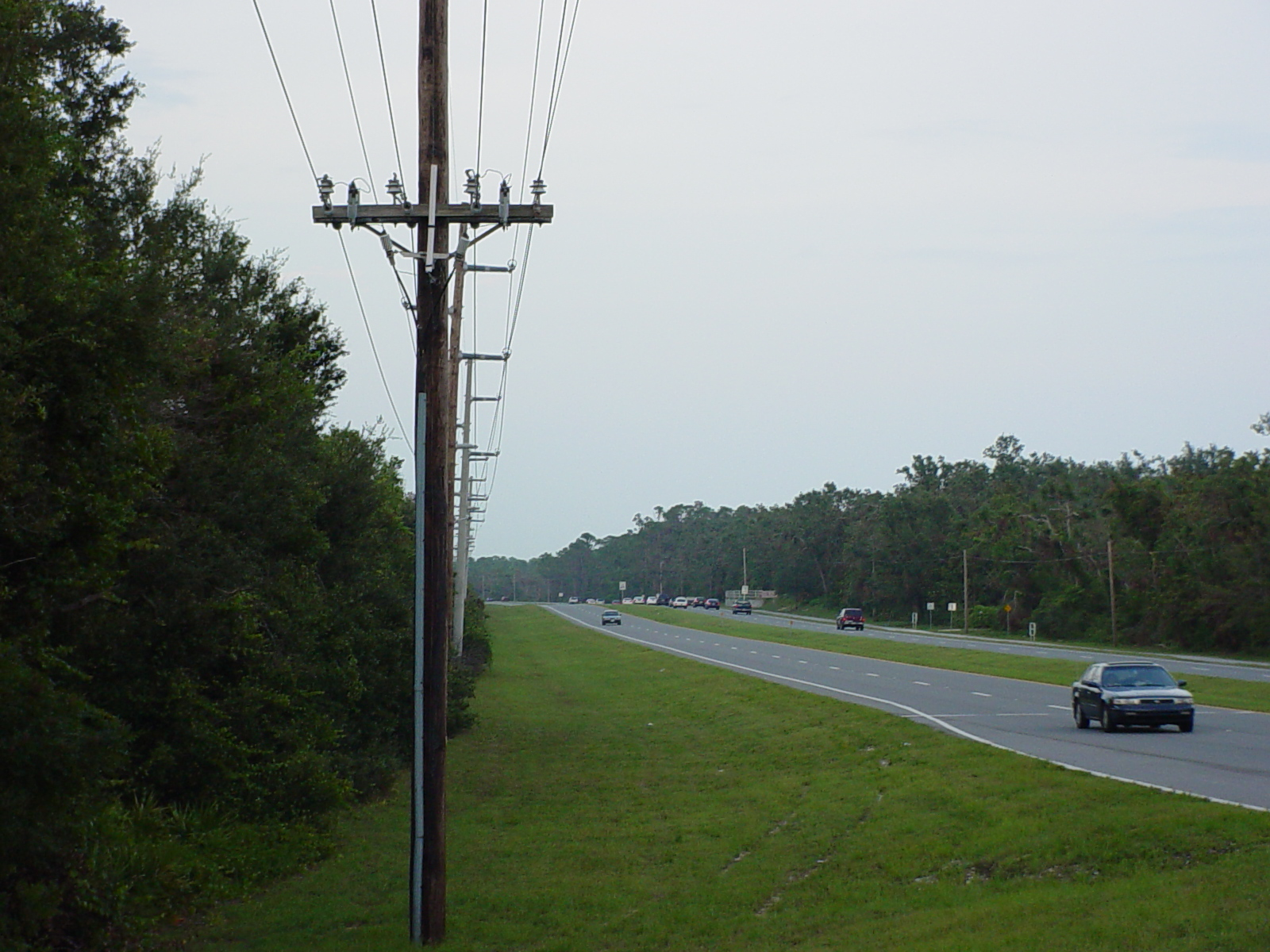
Highway 98 going through the Naval Live Oaks.

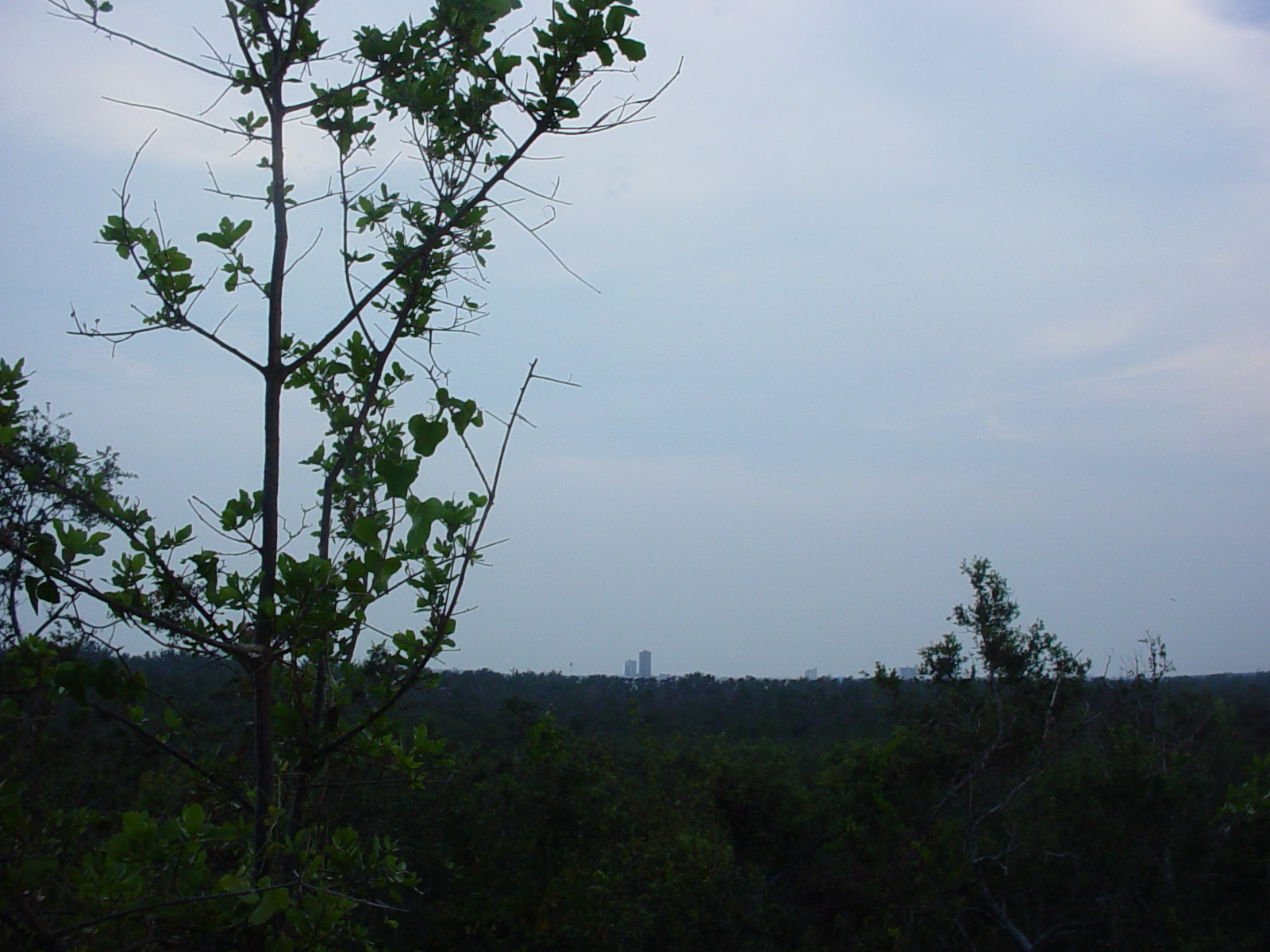
View from the top of the bluff in the Naval Live Oaks, looking south on the rest of the reservation.
