= Gulf Breeze, Florida =

- City
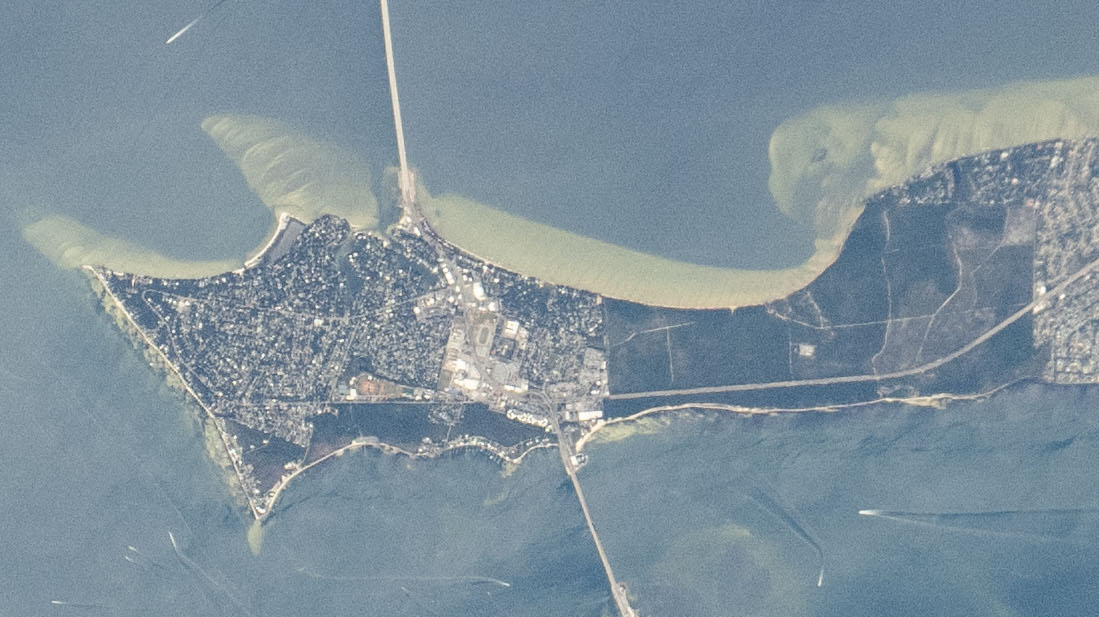
- View from ISS Expedition 72 (2024)

- Logo

- Location in Santa Rosa County and the state of Florida
- Coordinates: 30°22′12″N 87°09′40″W
- Country: United States
- State: Florida
- County: Santa Rosa
- Settled: 1875
- Founded: 1935
- Incorporated: August 10, 1961
- Founder: The Duncan Family

Government
  - Type: Council-Manager

Area
  - City: 22.14 sq mi (57.34 km^{2})
  - Land: 4.68 sq mi (12.12 km^{2})
  - Water: 17.46 sq mi (45.22 km^{2})
- Elevation: 13 ft (4.0 m)

Population (2020)
  - City: 6,302
  - Density: 1,355/sq mi (523.1/km^{2})
  - Metro: 509,905 (Pensacola metropolitan area)
- Time zone: UTC-6 (CST)
  - Summer (DST): UTC-5 (CDT)
- ZIP codes: 32561, 32562, 32563
- Area code: 850
- FIPS code: 12-28000
- GNIS feature ID: 2403769
- Website: cityofgulfbreeze.us

Gulf Breeze is a city in Santa Rosa County, Florida. It is located between Downtown Pensacola and Pensacola Beach, and is part of the Pensacola Metropolitan Area. The population was 6,340 at the 2020 census, up from 5,763 at the 2010 census.

Gulf Breeze is the nearest city to Pensacola Beach, and provides utility services to the island, and most of South Santa Rosa County covering over 33 square miles. The census designated places of Oriole Beach, Tiger Point, and Midway are considered to be a part of unincorporated Gulf Breeze by Santa Rosa County, and carry Gulf Breeze mailing addresses.

== History ==
The area now known as Gulf Breeze was originally settled in the mid-18th Century by the British. Gulf Breeze's original name was Town Point. Live Oaks from the Gulf Breeze area were used for shipbuilding and blacksmiths set up ship repair shops in the town. A Confederate camp and hospital was set up in the Deer Point area of Gulf Breeze during the Civil War.

In the late 1800s, a dry dock for ship repair was built on Deadman's Island (now a nature preserve). The island was originally a major ship quarantine area used by Pensacola. Deadman's Island got its name from Deadman anchors. Deadman's Island later was host to a glue factory and fertilizer plant.

The five year period between 1928 and 1933 saw large road development in Gulf Breeze. The first bridge between Pensacola and Gulf Breeze was built by Johnson, Drake & Piper. Gulf Breeze's first paved road was U.S. Highway 98, completed in 1933. A wooden swing bridge was established between Pensacola Beach and Gulf Breeze in 1931. The swing bridge was replaced by a concrete toll bridge in 1946, which was itself replaced by the Bob Sikes Bridge in 1973.

The name Gulf Breeze comes from the Gulf Breeze Cottages and Store, where the area's first post office was established in 1936. The city was incorporated on August 10, 1961 as a result of the expansion of Pensacola Bay Bridge. Gulf Breeze became famous after the 1987 Gulf Breeze UFO Incident and the Gulf Breeze Six desertions.

== Geography ==
The city has a total area of 23.56 square miles (61.0 km^{2}), of which 4.68 square miles (12.1 km^{2}) is land and 18.88 square miles (48.9 km^{2}) is water.

Growth of the city itself is geographically restricted, surrounded by major water bodies on three sides; the eastern portion of Gulf Breeze is occupied by the Naval Live Oaks Reservation. As a result, new growth takes place east of the city limits along U.S. Highway 98.

=== Climate ===
Gulf Breeze, FL

Climate chart (precipitation, max. and min. temperature)
J	F	M	A	M	J	J	A	S	O	N	D
5.7 61 43	4.9 64 45	6.3 70 52	4 75 57	4.4 83 65	5.2 88 72	7.1 90 74	6.1 92 74	6.7 87 70	4.2 79 59	4.4 71 51	4 64 45
- █ Average max. and min. temperatures in °F
- █ Precipitation totals in inches
- Source: weather.com/NOAA.gov
Metric conversion
J	F	M	A	M	J	J	A	S	O	N	D
145 16 6	124 18 7	160 21 11	102 24 14	112 28 18	132 31 22	180 32 23	155 33 23	170 31 21	107 26 15	112 22 11	102 18 7
- █ Average max. and min. temperatures in °C
- █ Precipitation totals in mm

== Demographics ==
Historical population
Census	Pop.	Note	%±
1970	4,190		—
1980	5,478		30.7%
1990	5,530		0.9%
2000	5,665		2.4%
2010	5,763		1.7%
2020	6,302		9.4%
U.S. Decennial Census

=== Racial and ethnic composition ===
Gulf Breeze racial composition (Hispanics excluded from racial categories) (NH = Non-Hispanic)
Race	Pop 2010	Pop 2020	% 2010	% 2020
White (NH)	5,403	5,573	93.75%	88.43%
Black or African American (NH)	19	19	0.33%	0.30%
Native American or Alaska Native (NH)	27	18	0.47%	0.29%
Asian (NH)	81	98	1.41%	1.56%
Pacific Islander or Native Hawaiian (NH)	1	3	0.02%	0.05%
Some other race (NH)	10	18	0.17%	0.29%
Two or more races/Multiracial (NH)	70	306	1.21%	4.86%
Hispanic or Latino (any race)	152	267	2.64%	4.24%
Total	5,763	6,302		

=== 2020 census ===
As of the 2020 census, Gulf Breeze had a population of 6,302. The median age was 48.3 years. 22.7% of residents were under the age of 18 and 23.9% of residents were 65 years of age or older. For every 100 females, there were 90.3 males, and for every 100 females age 18 and over, there were 85.7 males age 18 and over.

91.9% of residents lived in urban areas, while 8.1% lived in rural areas.

There were 2,587 households in Gulf Breeze, of which 31.0% had children under the age of 18 living in them. Of all households, 55.7% were married-couple households, 13.3% were households with a male householder and no spouse or partner present, and 27.6% were households with a female householder and no spouse or partner present. About 27.4% of all households were made up of individuals and 16.3% had someone living alone who was 65 years of age or older.

There were 2,809 housing units, of which 7.9% were vacant. The homeowner vacancy rate was 1.4% and the rental vacancy rate was 12.2%.

According to 2020 ACS 5-year estimates, there were 1,809 families residing in the city.

=== 2010 census ===
As of the 2010 United States census, there were 5,763 people, 2,185 households, and 1,758 families residing in the city.

=== 2000 census ===
As of the census of 2000, there were 5,665 people, 2,377 households, and 1,678 families living in the city. The population density was 1,192.0 inhabitants per square mile (460.2/km^{2}). There were 2,553 housing units at an average density of 537.2 units per square mile (207.4 units/km^{2}).

In 2000, there were 2,377 households, out of which 28.1% had children under the age of 18 living with them, 57.7% were married couples living together, 10.6% had a female householder with no husband present, and 29.4% were non-families. 25.3% of all households were made up of individuals, and 13.0% had someone living alone who was 65 years of age or older. The average household size was 2.36 and the average family size was 2.83.

In 2000, in the city, the population was spread out, with 22.3% under the age of 18, 4.6% from 18 to 24, 22.5% from 25 to 44, 29.7% from 45 to 64, and 20.8% who were 65 years of age or older. The median age was 45 years. For every 100 females, there were 89.4 males. For every 100 females age 18 and over, there were 83.6 males.

In 2000, the median income for a household in the city was $52,522, and the median income for a family was $61,661. Males had a median income of $44,408 versus $28,159 for females. The per capita income for the city was $34,688. About 3.8% of families and 4.2% of the population were below the poverty line, including 5.5% of those under age 18 and 1.2% of those age 65 or over.

== Arts and culture ==
=== Points of interest ===
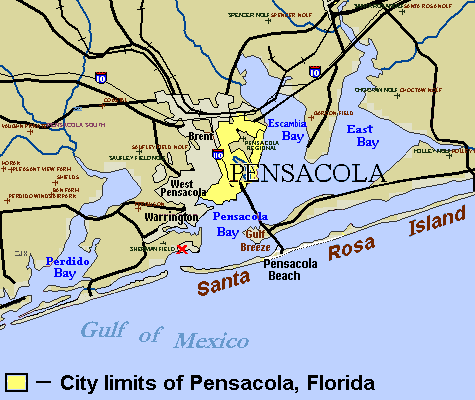
Gulf Breeze (lower center) is north of Pensacola Beach, Florida, south of Pensacola, and surrounded by Pensacola Bay.

In 1828 the U.S. government purchased the land encompassing the Naval Live Oaks Reservation for experimenting with acorns for the cultivation of live oaks to produce wooden ships. Before the Civil War, the wood of the live oak was the primary material of choice for shipbuilders, thus the protection and cultivation of the trees for the United States Navy was considered vital for defense in those turbulent times. Currently, the land comprises over 1,300 acres (530 ha) in Gulf Islands National Seashore and is supervised by the National Park Service. To the south of Highway 98 is a visitor center for the Gulf Islands National Seashore and several public beach areas.

=== Gulf Breeze Library ===
Gulf Breeze Library
- 30.3558°N 87.1717°W
- Location: Gulf Breeze, Florida
- Established: 1971
- Branch of: Santa Rosa County Library System

The Gulf Breeze Library, opened in 1971, is part of the Santa Rosa County Library System.

== Education ==
=== Gulf Breeze Academic Plaza ===
The Gulf Breeze Academic Plaza is a complex of 14 buildings clustered around US Highway 98 in Gulf Breeze, Florida. The GBAP consists of Gulf Breeze Elementary School, Gulf Breeze Middle School, and Gulf Breeze High School. Also included in the complex is Dolphin Field at Gulf Breeze Stadium (football, soccer, lacrosse, track and field), Dolphin Stadium (baseball), and Gulf Breeze Softball Stadium (softball).

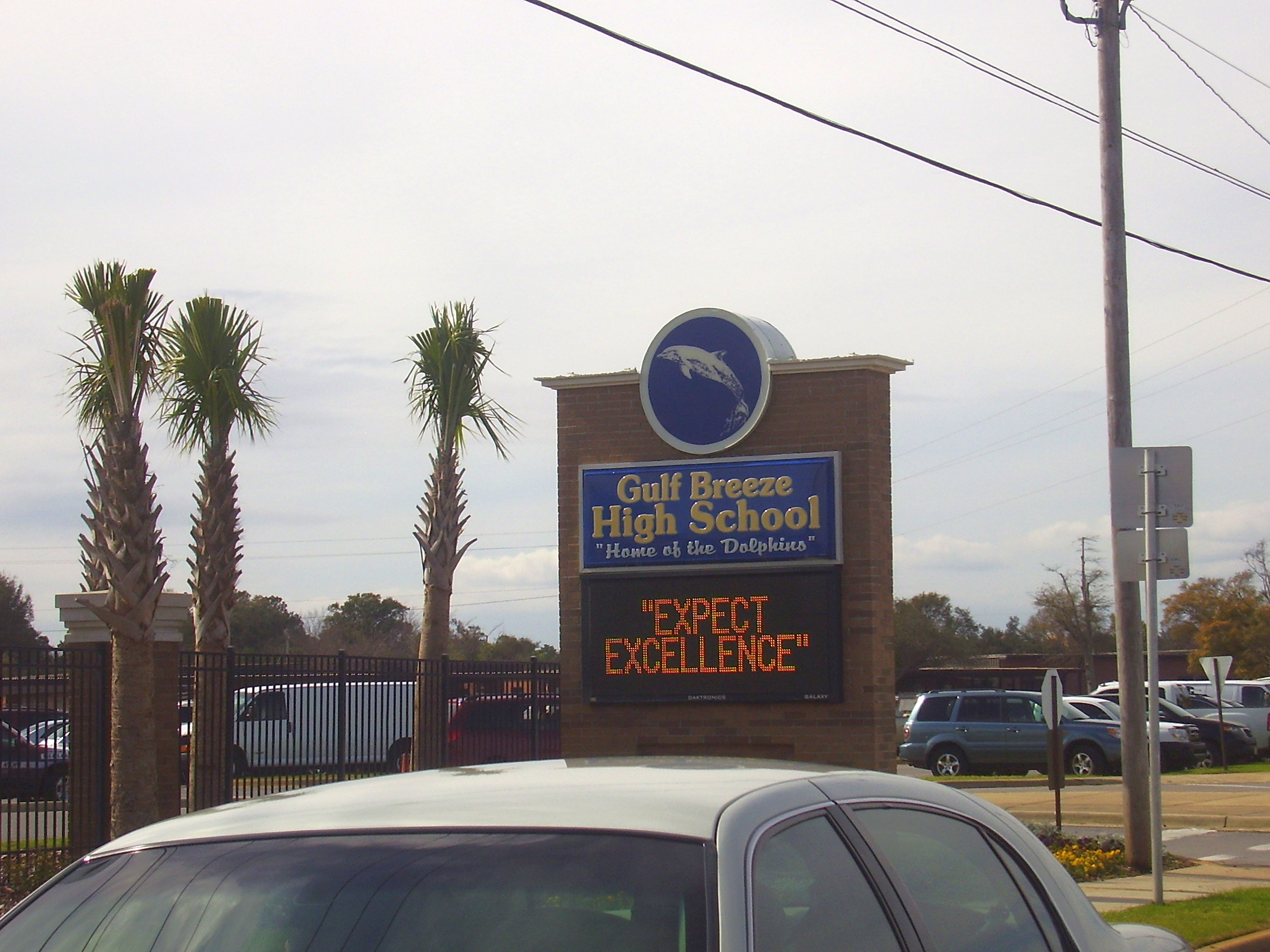
Gulf Breeze High School

- Gulf Breeze High School
- Gulf Breeze Middle School
- Gulf Breeze Elementary School

== Infrastructure ==
Gulf Breeze is served by route 61 of Escambia County Area Transit.

== Notable people ==
- Bob Armstrong (1939–2020), professional wrestler (longtime resident)
- Doug Baldwin (born 1988), American football player
- Ashley Brown (born 1982), singer and actress
- Ben Lively (born 1992), baseball pitcher for the Cleveland Guardians
- Jason McKie (born 1980), American football player
- Frank Spellman (1922–2017), Olympic champion weightlifter
- Abigail Spencer (born 1981), actress; born and raised in Gulf Breeze
- Adrian Street (born 1940), professional wrestler (longtime resident)

== See also ==
- Gulf Breeze UFO incident
- Third Gulf Breeze
