= List of waterways in Navarre, Florida =

This is a list of waterways in Navarre, Florida, including all bodies of water within the Navarre, Navarre Beach, and Holley Census Designated Places.

== By basin ==
=== East Bay ===
- Chimney Cove
- Doghole Basin
- Catfish Basin
  - Catfish Branch
- East Lagoon
  - East Bay River
    - Alligator Creek
    - Panther Creek
    - Parker Lake via an unnamed creek
  - Dean Creek
    - West Head
    - Watering Head
      - Steep Head
    - East Head
  - Gable Lake via an unnamed stream
    - Hidden Pond via an unnamed stream
      - Hidden Creek
  - Poplar Creek
- Fundy Bayou
- Miller Bayou
- Tom King Bayou
- Yellow River
  - Boiling Creek
    - Fishtrap Branch
    - Holley Creek
      - Indigo Creek
    - Little Boiling Creek
    - Poplar Branch
      - Atwell Pond
  - Weaver River
    - Weaver Creek
      - Boggy Branch
      - Double Head Branch
        - Buck Pond
    - Hicks Creek

=== Santa Rosa Sound ===
- William's Creek
  - Several unnamed creeks
- Several unnamed creeks on mainland
- Several unnamed canals on Santa Rosa Island

=== Unconnected to larger bodies ===
- Orion Lake
- Prairie Ponds
- Various unnamed ponds

== See also ==
- Navarre, Florida
