= Buck Pond =

Buck Pond may refer to:

- Buck Pond (Navarre, Florida)
- Buck Pond (Big Moose, New York)
- Buck Pond (McKeever, New York)
- Buck Pond (Nehasane Lake, New York)
- Buck Pond (Stillwater, New York)
