= Gable Lake =

Small lake in Navarre, Florida

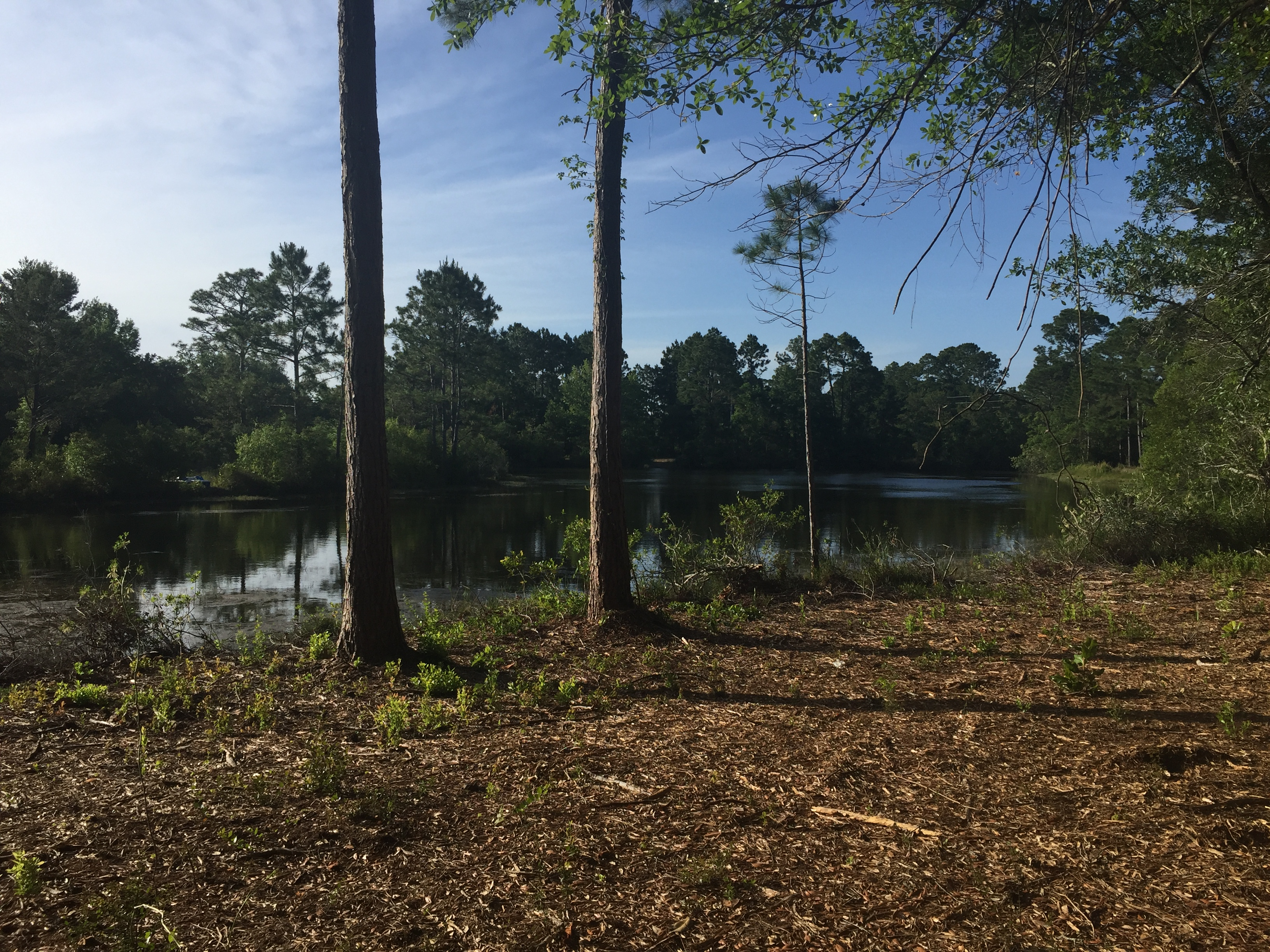

- Location within Florida Location within the United States
- Coordinates: 30°26′09″N 86°55′06″W
- Primary outflows: East Bay River and East Bay via an unnamed creek
- Surface area: 2.8 acres (1.1 ha)
- Shore length^{1}: 1,770 feet (540 m)
- Surface elevation: 13 feet (4.0 m)
- Islands: 0
- Settlements: Navarre, Florida
- ^{1} Shore length is not a well-defined measure.

Gable Lake is a small lake located in Navarre, Florida. The lake is primarily fed by a number of small unnamed creeks on the south shore. Subsequently, the lake outflows into the East Bay River and the East Bay via a small unnamed stream. Due to the former lack of a GNIS entry on the body of water, the name of the lake was not official until a recent ruling by the United States Board on Geographic Names.

Gable Lake is presumed to be named after John Everett Gabel and Katherine Gabel, who lived in the area during the 1980s and 90s.

== See also ==
- East Bay
- East Bay River
- Navarre, Florida
- William's Creek
