= Thomas King =

Thomas King or Tom King may refer to:

== Politicians ==
- Thomas King (died 1688), English merchant and politician
- Thomas King (died 1725), member of parliament for Queenborough, son of the above
- T. Butler King (1800–1864), American politician from Georgia
  - SS Thomas B. King, a Liberty ship
- Thomas King (New Zealand politician) (1821–1893), New Zealand politician
- Thomas King (Australian politician) (1833–1886), South Australian minister of education, 1878–1881
- Thomas King (Canadian politician) (1879–1972), merchant, farmer and politician in British Columbia, Canada
- Thomas R. King (fl. 1943–44), chairman of the Democratic Party of Wisconsin
- Tom King, Baron King of Bridgwater (born 1933), British Conservative politician
- Tom King (Mississippi politician) (born 1947), Mississippi transportation commissioner, former state senator

== Sports ==
- Thomas King (boxer) (1835–1888), English boxer, heavyweight champion of England
- Tom King (basketball) (1924–2015), American professional basketball player
- Tom King (footballer, born 1995), Wales international football goalkeeper
- Tom King (footballer, born 2006), English football forward
- Tom King (sailor) (born 1973), Australian sailing gold medalist at the 2000 Summer Olympics
- Tom King (American football) (1895–1972), American college football and basketball player and coach

== Others ==
- Thomas Joseph King (army officer) (1891–1971), New Zealand army officer
- Tom King (highwayman) (died 1737), English highwayman
- Thomas King (actor) (1730–1805), English actor, theatre manager and dramatist
- Thomas A. King (1921–2012), rear admiral and first graduate of the United States Merchant Marine Academy
- Thomas Starr King (1824–1864), American Unitarian minister, influential in California politics during the American Civil War
- Thomas King (astronomer) (1858–1916), New Zealand astronomer
- Thomas King (botanist) (1834–1896), Scottish botanist
- Thomas C. King (c. 1847–1904), one of the first Black settlers in Oregon
- Thomas Joseph King (1921–2000), American biologist
- Thomas J. King Jr. (1925–1994), American educator and Shakespearean scholar
- Thomas M. King (1929–2009), American Jesuit priest and scholar of theology and philosophy at Georgetown University
- Thomas King (merchant), British merchant and privateer
- Thomas King (novelist) (born 1943), Canadian novelist and broadcaster
- Thomas King (slave trader), British slave-trader
- Thomas Wilkinson King (1809–1847), English pathologist and anatomist
- Tom King (musician) (1942–2011), songwriter, founding member of the 1960s rock band The Outsiders
- Tom King (writer) (born 1978), novelist and comic book writer
- Harry Balk or Tom King (1925–2016), American record producer and songwriter

== Fictional people ==
- Tom King (Emmerdale), a character in the British soap opera Emmerdale
- Thomas King (Emmerdale), a character in the British soap opera Emmerdale

== Locations ==
- Tom King Bayou
- Tom King Bayou Bridge
