= Miller Point (Florida) =

Small cape jutting in Navarre, Florida

- Cape
- Coordinates: 30°27′32″N 086°55′51″W
- Offshore water bodies: East Lagoon (East Bay)
- Topo map: Holley

Miller Point is a small cape jutting out into East Bay on the Holley side of Navarre, Florida. Along with Axelson Point, it makes up part of the mouth of East Bay's narrow east side, called East Lagoon, which flows from the Jordan River (also called the East Bay River).
