= Dean Creek (Florida) =

Creek in Holley-Navarre, Florida, United States

Dean Creek Deer Creek

Physical characteristics
- Mouth: East Lagoon
  - location: 30°26′39″N 086°53′15″W

Basin features
- Cities: Navarre, Florida

Dean Creek is a creek primarily on Eglin Air Force Base, near Holley and Navarre, Florida.
