= Guy Wyman =

Colonel in the US Army during World War I

Guy Herbert Wyman
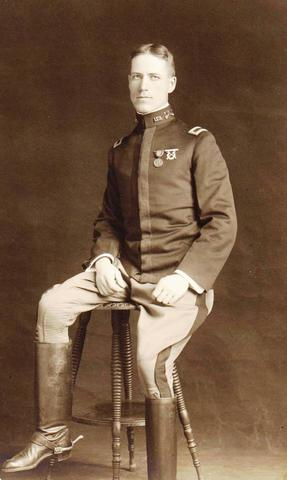
- Born: May 21, 1878; Perry, Ohio, United States
- Died: April 15, 1953 (aged 74); Valparaiso, Florida, United States
- Relatives: Patricia Wyman Michetti (Daughter; 1935-2020)
- Military career
- Allegiance: United States of America
- Branch: United States Army
- Rank: Colonel
- Unit: 11th Cavalry Regiment
- Other work: Founder of Navarre, Florida

Guy Wyman (1878-1953) was a colonel in the US Army during World War I. He previously served as a quartermaster sergeant in K Troop, 11th Cavalry Regiment, and later served as a second lieutenant of the 11th Cavalry Regiment. Though he was not the first settler to the area, he did have relatives in the area who had been present since at least 1827, and he is credited as being the founder of the community of Navarre, Florida. He first surveyed the land in 1905. While serving as a surveyor in the US Army, he then later came back to Navarre, platting and naming the community in 1925. In 1930 and 1931, he served as an engineer in the construction of the original Pensacola Bay Bridge. After later moving to Valparaiso, Florida, he served as an engineer at Eglin Air Force Base. According to Santa Rosa County, he also donated and sold most of the land that is now Navarre Park.

== Navarre ==
Wyman first visited the area that Navarre would eventually be located on in 1905, while surveying the land during his service with the U.S. Army. His parents would move there shortly after. In 1915, six months after the death of his parents, he returned to the area from a deployment to the Philippines. After serving in World War I, he retired with the rank of colonel, and once again returned to the area. In 1925, he would plat and name the town, Navarre, most likely after the province in Spain with the same name.

During the Great Depression, he was forced to sell some of this land to Santa Rosa County. This land eventually became Navarre Park.

== See also ==
- Navarre, Florida
- Pensacola Bay Bridge
- Eglin Air Force Base
