= Poplar Creek (Florida) =

- Location in Florida

Physical characteristics
- Mouth: East Bay
  - location: Holley, Florida
  - coordinates: 30°27′35″N 86°55′36″W

Poplar Creek is a creek tributary of the narrowed river-like side of East Bay, in the Holley neighborhood of Navarre, Florida.
