= Tom King Bayou =

Bayou in Navarre, Florida

- Etymology: Origin unclear, though name dates back to prior to 1915

Physical characteristics
- Source
  - location: Navarre, Florida
  - coordinates: 30°24′58″N 086°56′20″W
- Mouth
  - location: East Bay, Navarre, Florida
  - coordinates: 30°27′08″N 086°56′19″W
- Length: 2.95 mi (4.75 km)

Basin features
- Cities: Navarre, Florida
- Bridges: Tom King Bayou Bridge

Tom King Bayou is a small, but locally important, bayou and creek in Navarre, Florida. The mouth of the bayou opens onto East Bay near Axelson Point and Robledal.

The bayou acts as a major runoff for stormwaters and is critical to the local environment and for local homes for this purpose.

== Recreation ==
The bayou is navigable by small boats for just short of a mile (1.6 km) and is a popular fishing spot. Though lacking the volume of recreators as other bodies of water in the area such as Santa Rosa Sound, paddleboarding and kayaking is not uncommon in the relatively calm waters of the bayou.

The origin of the name of the water body is mostly unclear, though the name does appear on maps as early as 1921 and is mentioned by name in accounts of the area from as early as 1915.

== Bridge ==
The bayou is crossed by East Bay Boulevard near the entrance of the bayou. Though it had no official name, the bridge is often referred to as Tom King Bayou Bridge.

The bridge had previously not been pedestrian friendly, despite sidewalks and trailway expansions along the connected East Bay Boulevard. However, several designs were furthered to allow for pedestrian friendliness. In 2022, a pedestrian bridge was constructed alongside the bridge to improve pedestrian connectivity and is part of a larger trail project by the Florida Greenways and Trails Foundation.
