= Poplar Creek =

Poplar Creek may refer to:

== Places ==
- Poplar Creek, British Columbia, unincorporated community
- Poplar Creek, Mississippi, unincorporated community
- Poplar Creek Music Theater, Hoffman Estates, Illinois
- Poplar Creek Public Library District, Illinois

== Creeks ==
- Poplar Creek (British Columbia), a tributary of the Lardeau River
- Poplar Creek (Florida), a tributary to East Bay
- Poplar Creek (Illinois), a tributary of the Fox River (Illinois River tributary)
- Poplar Creek (Tennessee), a tributary of the Clinch River
- Poplar Creek (Dan River tributary), a stream in Halifax County, Virginia
