= Navarre Library =

Main library of Navarre, Florida

- 30.413410°N 86.867994°W
- Location: Navarre, Florida, United States of America
- Established: circa 1980
- Branch of: Santa Rosa County Library System

Access and use
- Population served: ~48,060 (41,930 of Navarre; 1,630 of Holley; ~1,500 of Woodlawn Beach; ~3,000 of Midway)

The Navarre Library is the community library of Navarre, Florida. The library is part of the Santa Rosa County Library System based out of Milton, Florida.

The branch is the primary provider of library services and book lending in Navarre, the third-largest community in the Florida Panhandle, only smaller than Pensacola and Tallahassee.

== History ==
The library was founded as an independent volunteer-run library after the county stopped bookmobile services in the 1980s. The library was eventually merged into the West Florida Public Libraries System, before leaving the system in 2006 with the other Santa Rosa County library branches to create the Santa Rosa County Library System.

The current building was built at its current location in the 1990s. Navarre Library has been renovated and updated several times since that point in time.

== See also ==
- Navarre, Florida
- Santa Rosa County, Florida
- Santa Rosa County Library System Website
