= Lower Pritchard Long Point =

Lower Pritchard Long Point Biscayne Pointe
- Cape
- Coordinates: 30.4010323°N 86.8310699°W
- Offshore water bodies: Santa Rosa Sound

Lower Pritchard Long Point is a cape in Navarre, Florida that juts into the Santa Rosa Sound. The point is also called Biscayne Pointe after the name of the neighborhood that takes up most of the landform. The point is also the location of a small airfield, Fort Walton Beach Airport.
