= Fort Walton Beach Airport =

Airport in Florida, U.S.

Coordinates: 30°24′23″N 086°49′45″W

- IATA: none; ICAO: none; FAA LID: 1J9

Summary
- Airport type: Public
- Owner: John S. Williams
- Location: Navarre, Florida
- Elevation AMSL: 22 ft (6.7 m)
- Interactive map of Fort Walton Beach Airport

Runways
| Direction | Length | | Surface |
| Direction | ft | m | Surface |
|---|---|---|---|
| 18/36 | 2,100 | 640 | Turf |

Statistics (2002)
- Aircraft operations: 8,030
- Source: Federal Aviation Administration

Fort Walton Beach Airport (FAA LID: 1J9) is a public-use airport located two miles (3 km) east of the central business district of Navarre, Florida in the United States. It is privately owned by John S. Williams.

== Facilities and aircraft ==
Fort Walton Beach Airport covers an area of 15 acres (6.1 ha) and contains one runway designated 18/36 with a turf surface measuring 2,100 x 65 feet (640 x 20 m). For the 12-month period ending May 23, 2002, the airport had 8,030 general aviation aircraft operations, an average of 22 per day.

The airfield is located on Lower Pritchard Long Point, allowing for its length despite being located in the normally thin stretch of land between Santa Rosa Sound and US Highway 98.

== See also ==
- List of airports in Florida
