= Panther Creek (Florida) =

River near Navarre, Florida, US

Physical characteristics
- Source
  - location: Eglin Air Force Base
- Mouth: East Bay River, Navarre, Florida
  - coordinates: 30.4293°N 86.8063°W
  - elevation: 3 ft (0.91 m)

Panther Creek is a small creek on Eglin Air Force Base, near Navarre, Florida.
