= Tom King Bayou Bridge =

- Coordinates: 30°26′46″N 86°56′10″W
- Carries: CR 399 (East Bay Boulevard)
- Crosses: Tom King Bayou
- Locale: Navarre, Florida
- Official name: CR 399 at Tom King Bayou
- Named for: Tom King Bayou
- Owner: Santa Rosa County

Characteristics
- Total length: 129.9 feet (39.6 m)
- Width: 33.5 feet (10.2 m)

History
- Opened: 1962

Tom King Bayou Bridge is the locally used name for the East Bay Boulevard bridge crossing at Tom King Bayou. The bayou is crossed by East Bay Boulevard near the entrance of the bayou.

== Description ==
Opening in 1962, the bridge is 129.9 feet long and 33.5 feet wide, with a roadway width of exactly 24 feet. Though the bridge is locally known by the name, Tom King Bayou Bridge, the bridge does not have an official name by county records.

The bridge is owned and maintained by the Santa Rosa County Roads and Bridges Department.

While structurally sound, the bridge does not meet many of the modern requirements in terms of geometry and design for safety. However, no plan to replace the structure or deck are currently in place or being discussed.

== Pedestrian Expansion ==
The bridge was previously not pedestrian friendly, despite sidewalks and trailway expansions along East Bay Boulevard. However, in the late 2010s, several designs began to be been furthered to allow for pedestrian friendliness. In 2022, a pedestrian bridge was constructed to coincide with the construction of a walking trail along East Bay Boulevard that was funded by a statewide walking trails foundation.
