= Emerald Coast Wildlife Refuge =

Zoo in Navarre, Florida, United States

- Interactive map of Emerald Coast Wildlife Refuge
- 30.4444835°N 86.8829648°W
- Date opened: December 7, 2019
- Location: 3051 Cloptons Circle, Navarre, Florida 32566
- No. of animals: ~130 at any given time
- Director: Crystie Baker
- Website: www.emeraldcoastwildliferefuge.org

The Emerald Coast Wildlife Refuge is a wildlife sanctuary and rehabilitation center in Navarre, Florida.

== History ==
The refuge was originally located in Okaloosa County, Florida, in 1994. At first, while there, the program operated out of private homes, before eventually opening makeshift facilities in 2000. The program, with the help of the local community managed to find more permanent facilities in 2005, before eventually moving to new purpose-built facilities in Navarre.

The refuge opened in the location in Navarre in 2019. The new facility cost approximately $1 million, and was greatly assisted by local volunteer and charity organizations, such as the Boy Scouts of America, the local Navarre Garden Club, and the Girl Scouts of the USA.

== Facilities and programs ==
The refuge includes a raptor rehabilitation center, public environmental outreach to the regional area, and professional animal-care staff. The refuge has also assisted law enforcement and wildlife authorities in the investigations of deaths of endangered animals.

The ECWR responds to certain crises involving local animals that animal control services cannot easily manage, such as issues involving birds of prey or beached marine mammals. The facility cares for approximately 130 animals at any one given time for rehabilitation purposes, but often takes in more after natural disasters.
