= Navarre Beach Sea Turtle Conservation Center =

Sea Turtle Conservation Education Center in Navarre, Florida

- Interactive map of Navarre Beach Sea Turtle Conservation Center
- 30.381909°N 86.860724°W
- Date opened: 2013
- Location: 8740 Gulf Blvd Navarre, Florida
- Floor space: 2,010 square feet (187 m^{2})
- Volume of largest tank: 15,000 U.S. gallons (57,000 L)
- Annual visitors: 65,000
- Website: https://navarrebeachseaturtles.org/

The Navarre Beach Sea Turtle Conservation Center is a sea turtle conservation and education center located in Navarre, Florida. Specifically, it is located within the Navarre Beach Marine Park.

The facility opened in 2013, using the building of an old ranger station that had been used by the state park service when the marine park was still a state park.The Navarre Beach Sea Turtle Conservation Center (NBSTCC) is a working conservation and education center open to the public on Navarre Beach, Florida. Founded in 2013 through grassroots community involvement, the NBSTCC's mission is to conserve and protect threatened and endangered sea turtles through community education and partnered research. As a predominately volunteer-run organization, NBSTCC operates a 2,010-square foot conservation and education center open to the public year-round. Through the doors of the NBSTCC, guests enter the main pool exhibit featuring a 15,000-gallon saltwater pool, home to Sweet Pea, a non-releasable green sea turtle, and Ambassador-in-residence of the NBSTCC. For many guests, Sweet Pea is the first sea turtle they have seen, and her story tells of the dangers and promise that human choices have on this imperiled species.

The center is a member of the global non-profit Species360 that seeks to better share information pertinent to the saving of endangered species, such as sea turtles.

The center is popular among eco-tourists visiting the area and is commonly cited as one of the best attractions in Navarre. The center sees 65,000 visitors annually.
