= Alligator Creek (East Bay River tributary) =

River in Santa Rosa County, Florida, US

- Location within Florida
- Interactive map of Alligator Creek
- Location: Eglin Air Force Base; Wright, Florida
- Coordinates: 30.4768643°N 86.6843992°W
- Type: Creek
- Part of: East Bay River basin
- Primary outflows: East Bay River
- Basin countries: United States

Alligator Creek is a creek on Eglin Air Force Base near Wright, Florida. It flows out to East Bay River and eventually into East Bay.
