= Navarre Beach Marine Park =

Beach park on Santa Rosa Island, Florida, U.S.

- IUCN category IV (habitat/species management area)
- Location within Florida
- Location: Navarre, Florida, US
- Nearest city: Navarre, Florida
- Coordinates: 30°22′58″N 86°51′43″W
- Established: May 2004
- Governing body: Santa Rosa County Department of Parks and Recreation

Navarre Beach Marine Park is a beach park run by the county commission of Santa Rosa County, located on Santa Rosa Island between Eglin Air Force Base property and the residential and commercial area of Navarre Beach. The address is 8704 Gulf Boulevard, Navarre, FL 32566.

== History ==
=== State Park ===
This park was open as a state park for only four months before it was extensively damaged by Hurricane Ivan in 2004, suffering further damage from Hurricane Dennis in 2005.

=== County Marine Park ===
In October 2005, the Santa Rosa County Commissioners announced that they were in negotiation with the state to return the park to county control. On the 9th of October in 2009, the Santa Rosa County Board of County Commissioners voted to take over the park. In this same year, the park was renamed to become, Navarre Beach County Park. In 2013, the park was renamed to its current name, the Navarre Beach Marine Park.

=== Science centers ===
In 2008, a marine science center was founded at a former ranger station on the property. This center is known as the Navarre Beach Marine Science Center, and was the first of three science and conservation organizations based in the small park.

The second of the three science and conservation programs based in the park opened in 2010. This organization is known as the Navarre Beach Marine Sanctuary, and has several artificial diving reefs located on both the gulf and sound sides of the park.

The third and newest of the three science organizations is the Navarre Beach Sea Turtle Conservation Center. While they have existed as an organization for several years before this point, they began operations in the park after they opened a specially built conservatory in the park in 2016.

== Recreational activities ==
The park is home to several different facilities for recreation and activity purposes. The park is home to five different beach access points, the three primary points on the gulf side of the park, and two additional, smaller access points on the Santa Rosa Sound side of the park. Two of these five access points also have diving reefs for snorkeling and scuba diving The park has a roughly one mile long path for walking, running, and bicycling. In addition, the park has a dozen pavilions with picnic tables and coal-fueled stoves, for picnics and outdoor meals. All five beach access points have public restrooms.

== Public safety ==
The park is patrolled by deputies of the Santa Rosa County Sheriff's Office and the waters are lifeguarded by the Navarre Beach Lifeguards, a division of the Navarre Beach Fire Rescue, one of the two fire departments operating in Navarre.
