= List of urbanized areas in Florida (by population) =

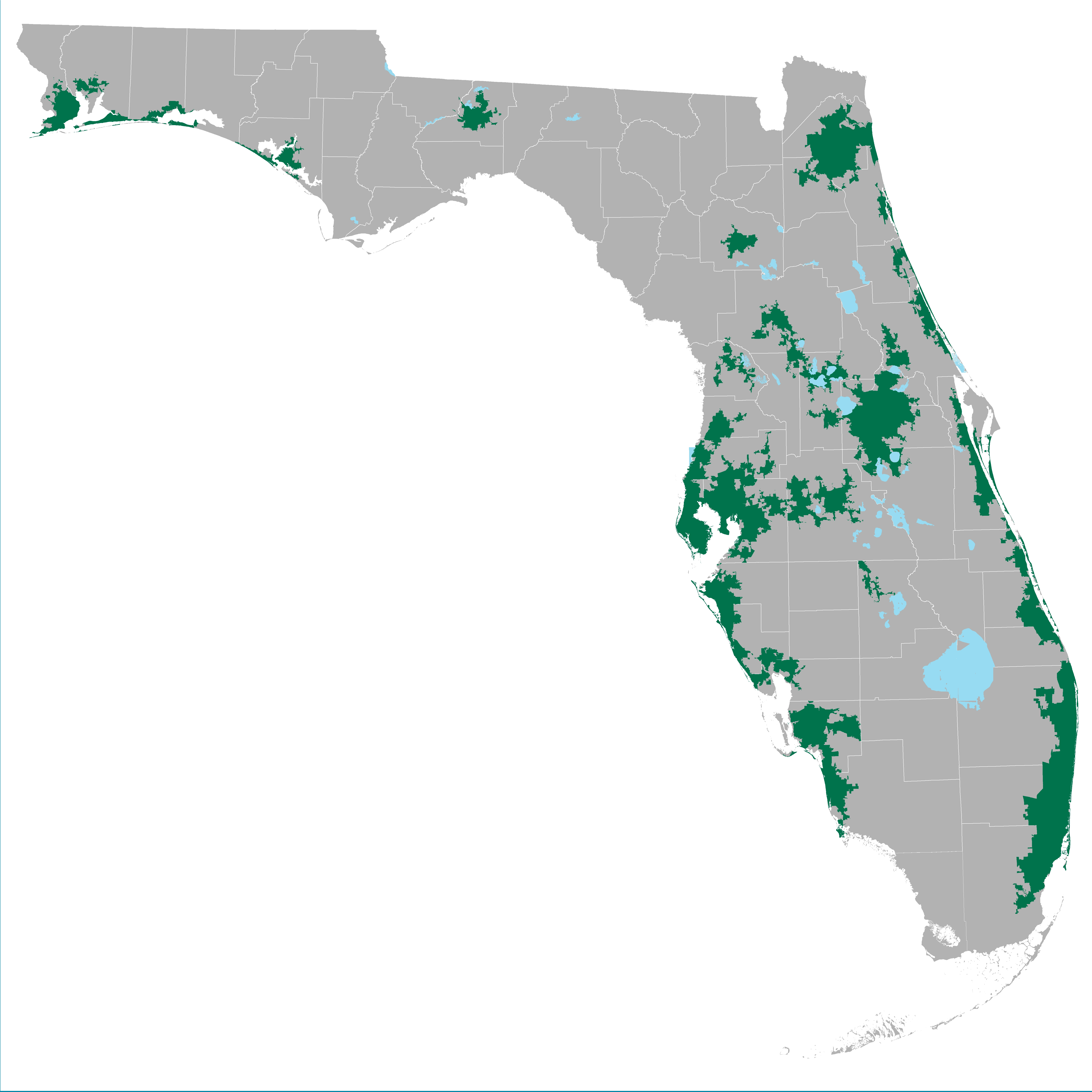
Map of Florida Urbanized Areas according the 2010 census

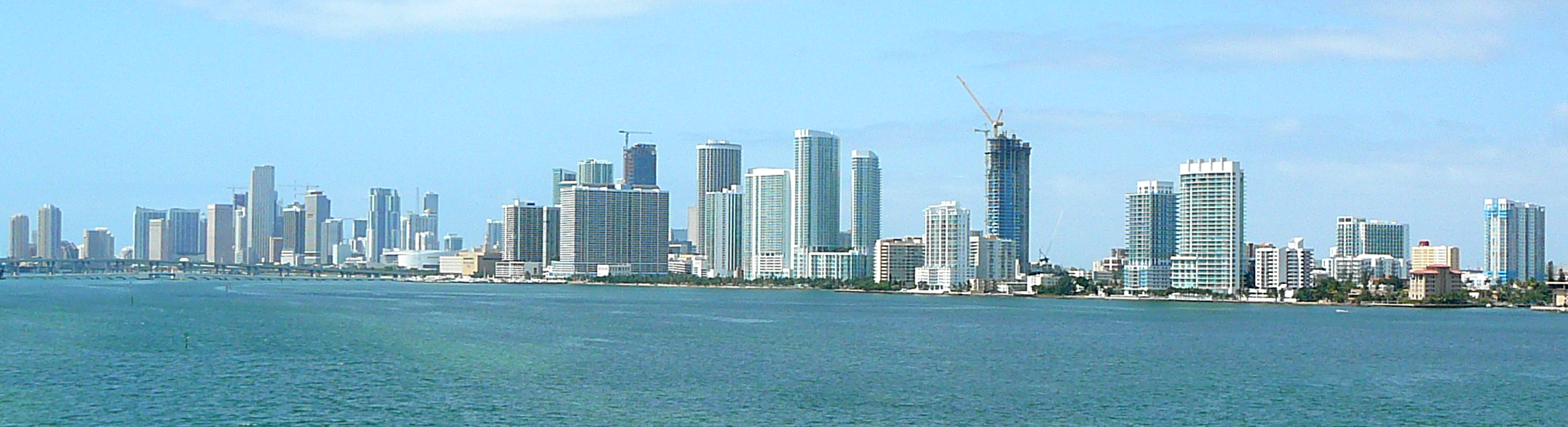
Miami-Fort Lauderdale

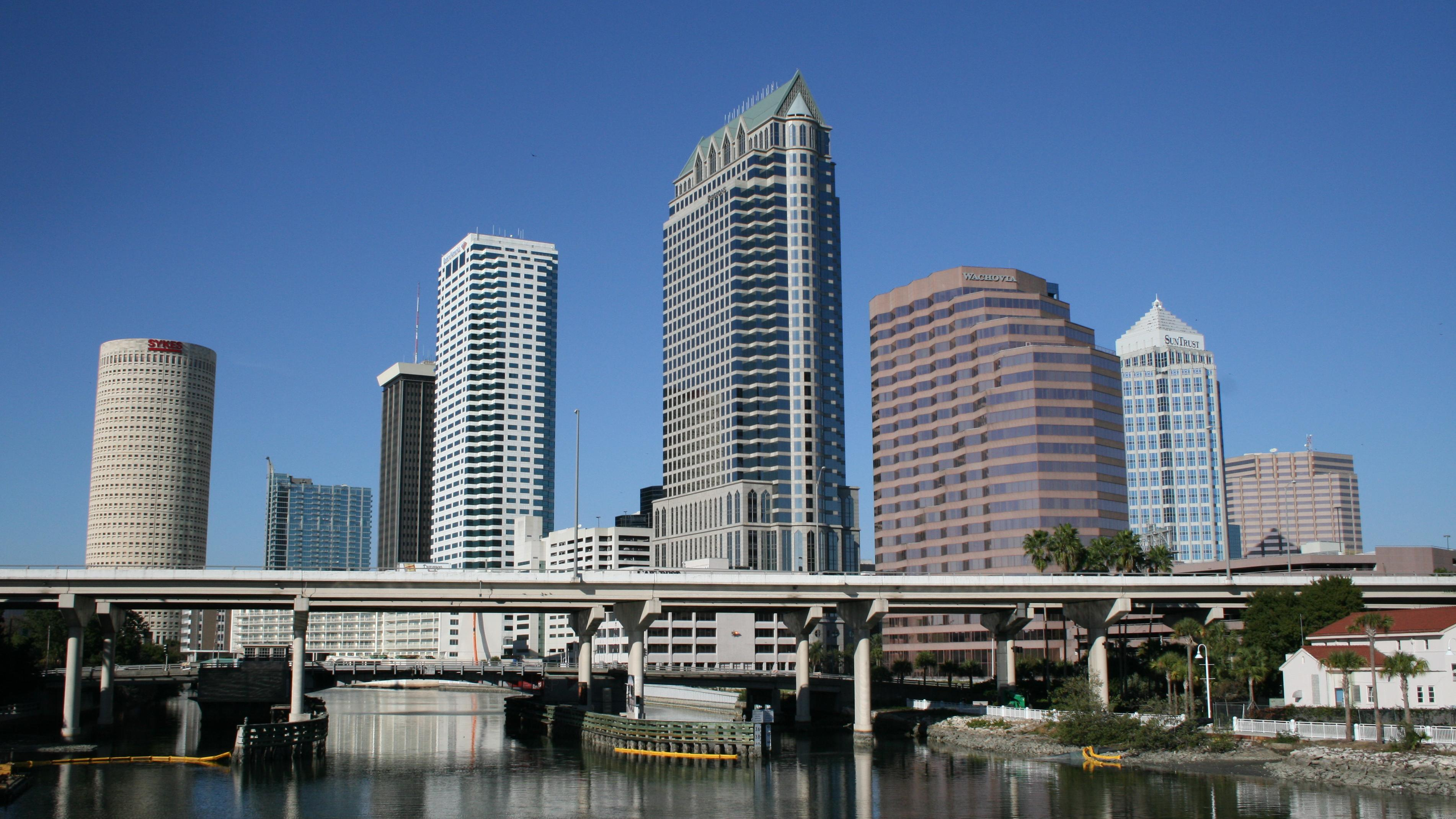
Tampa-St. Petersburg

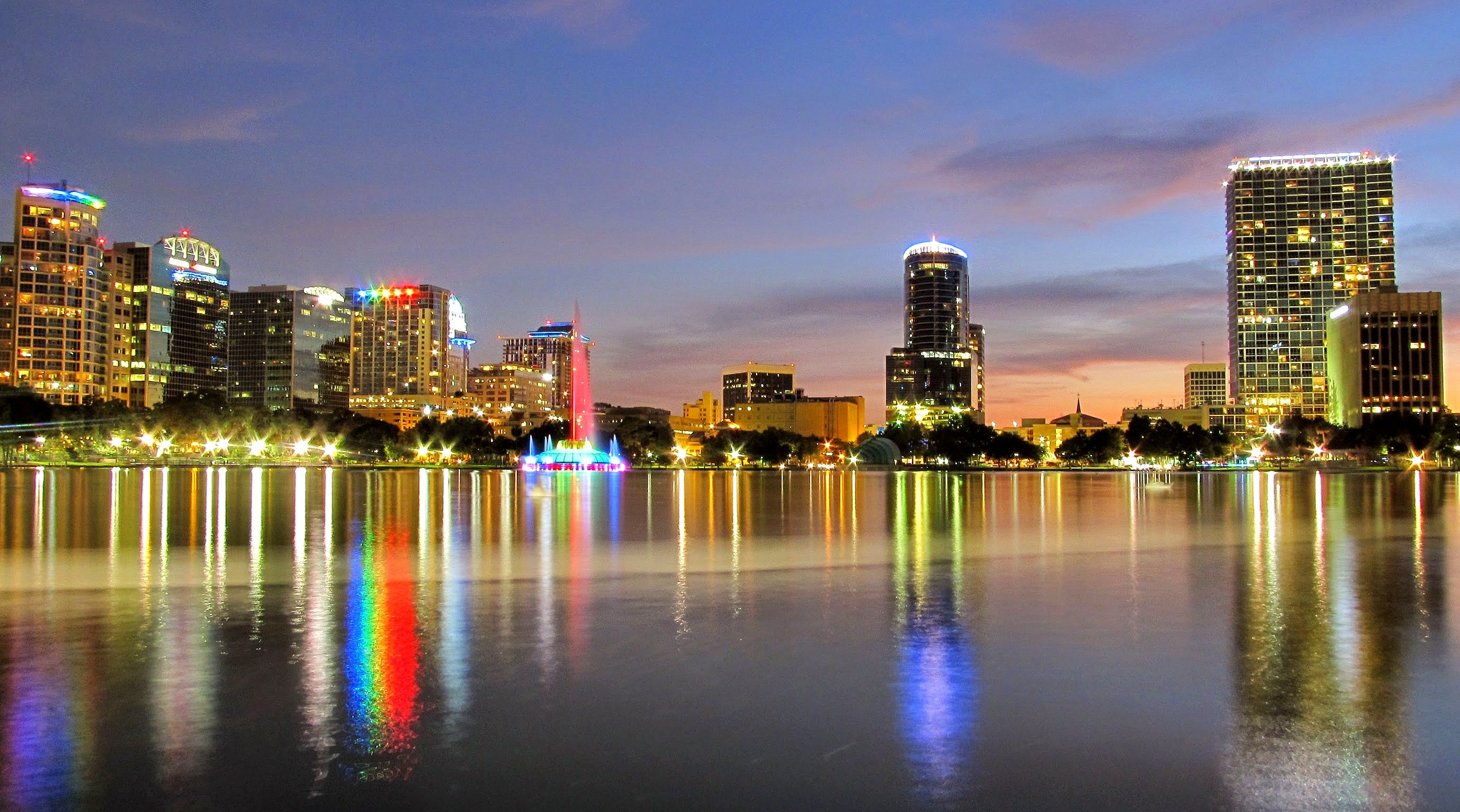
Orlando

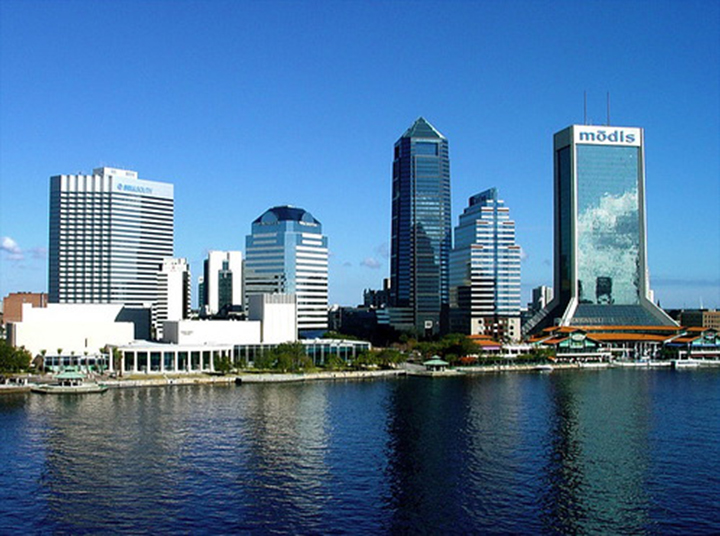
Jacksonville

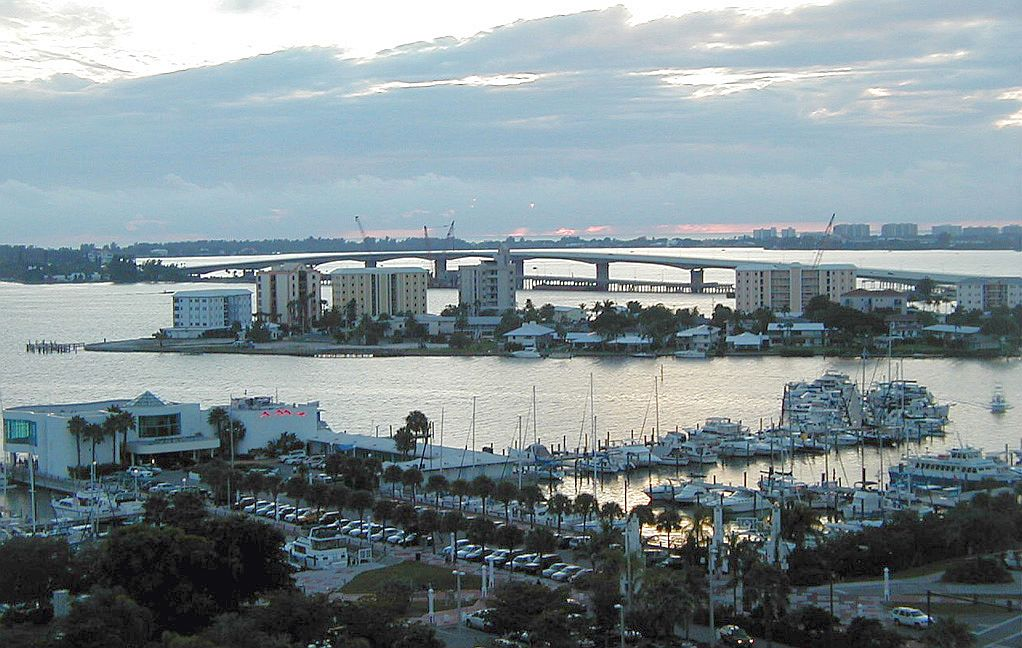
Bradenton-Sarasota-Venice

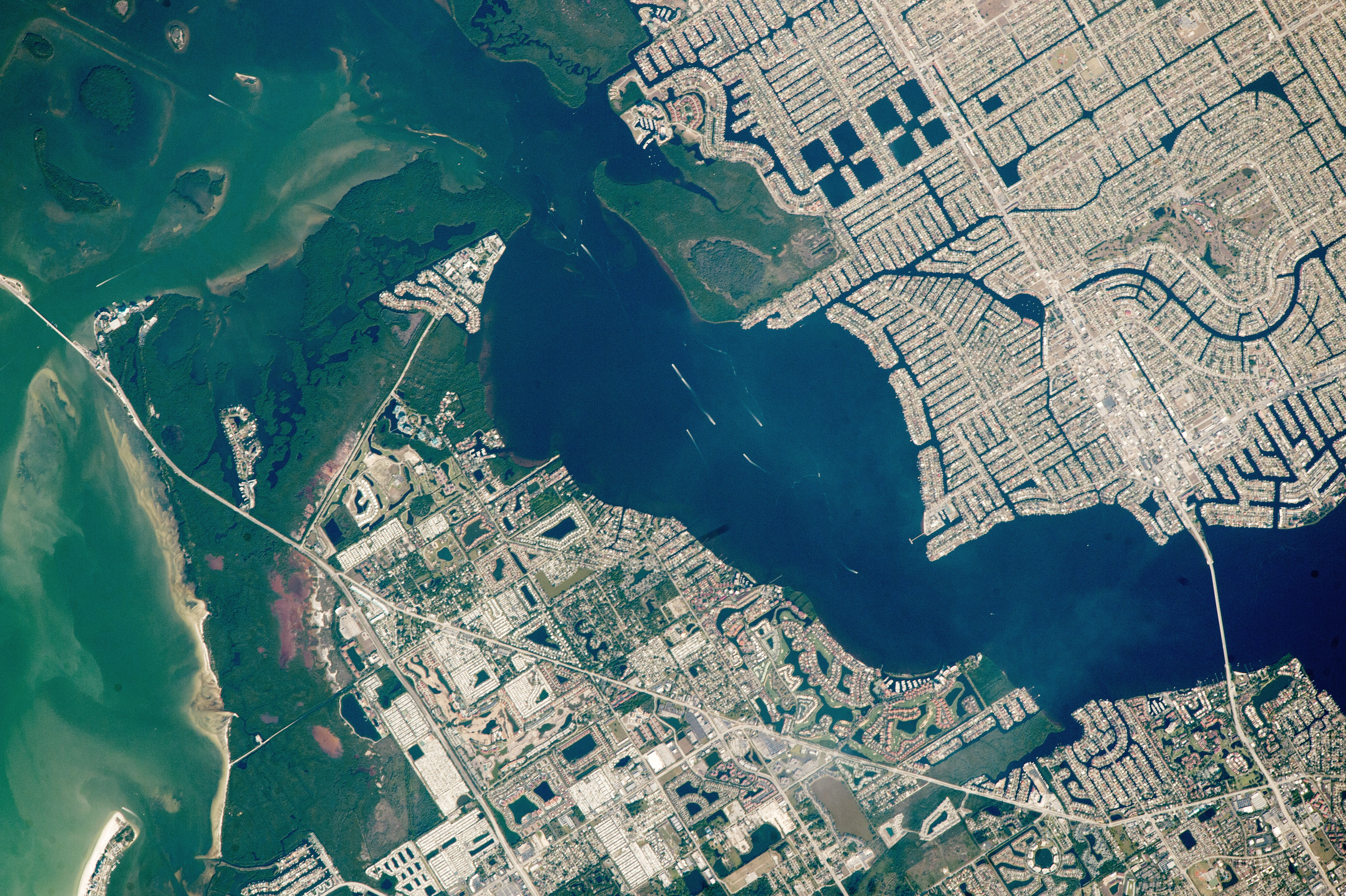
Cape Coral

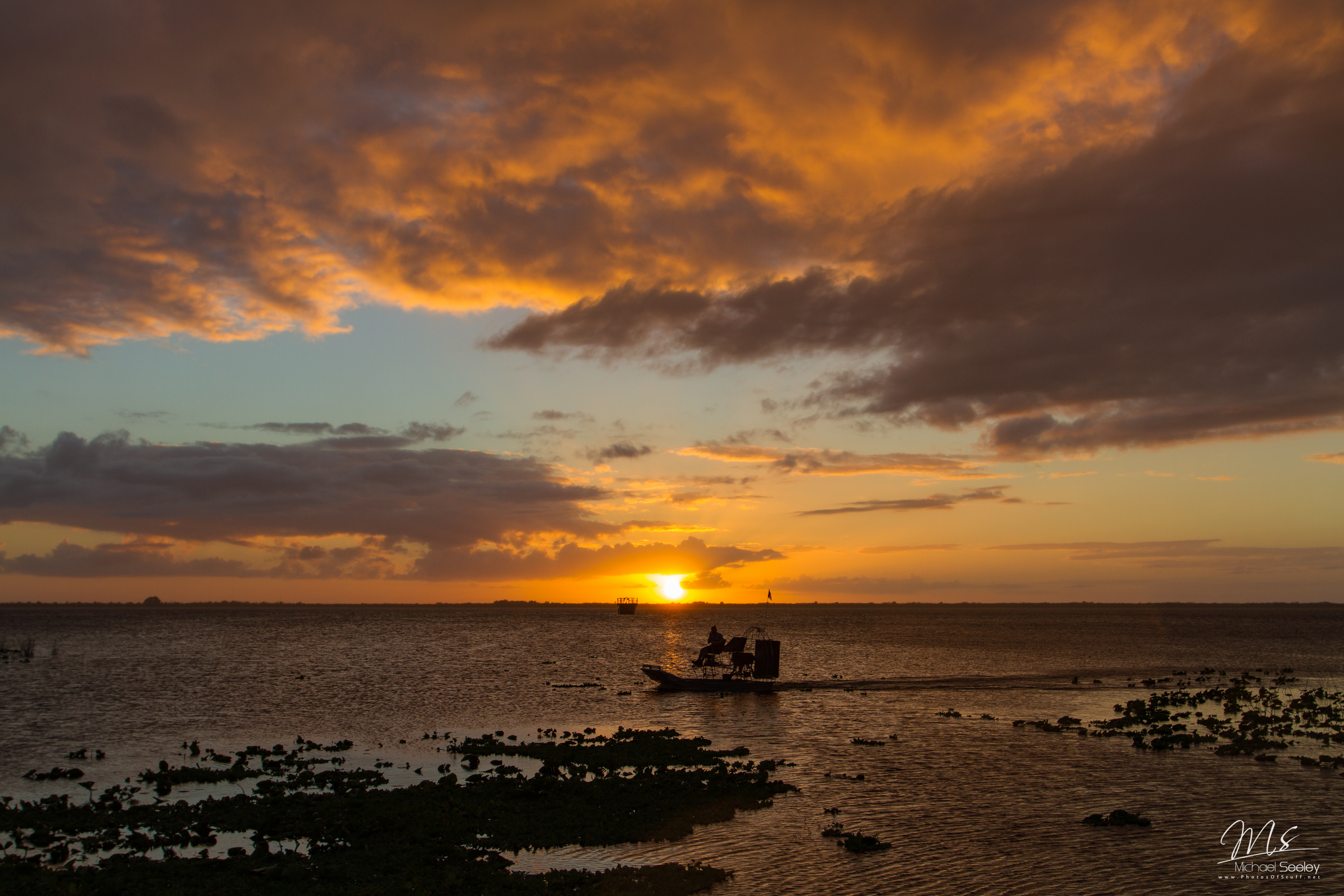
Palm Bay-Melbourne

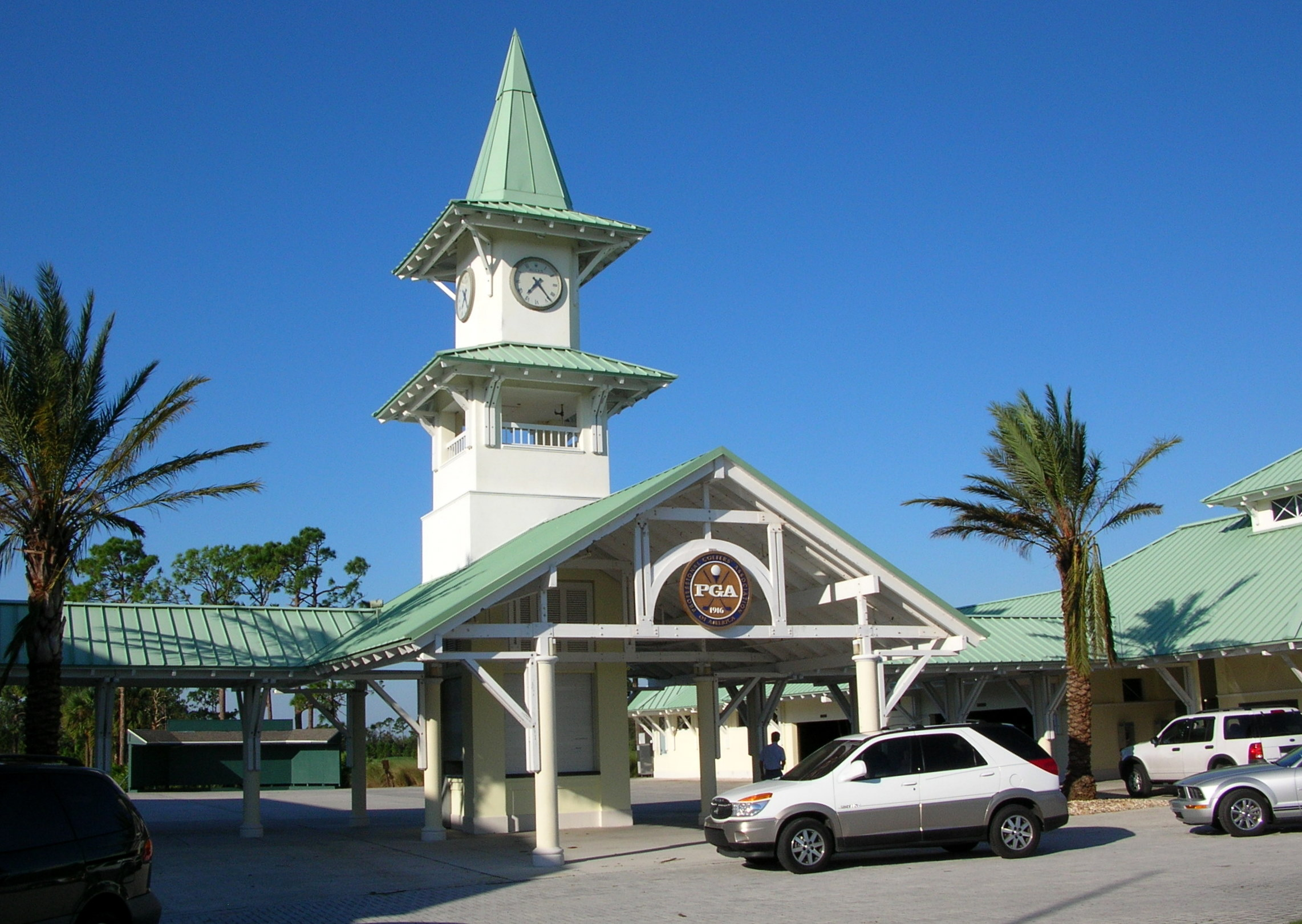
Port St. Lucie

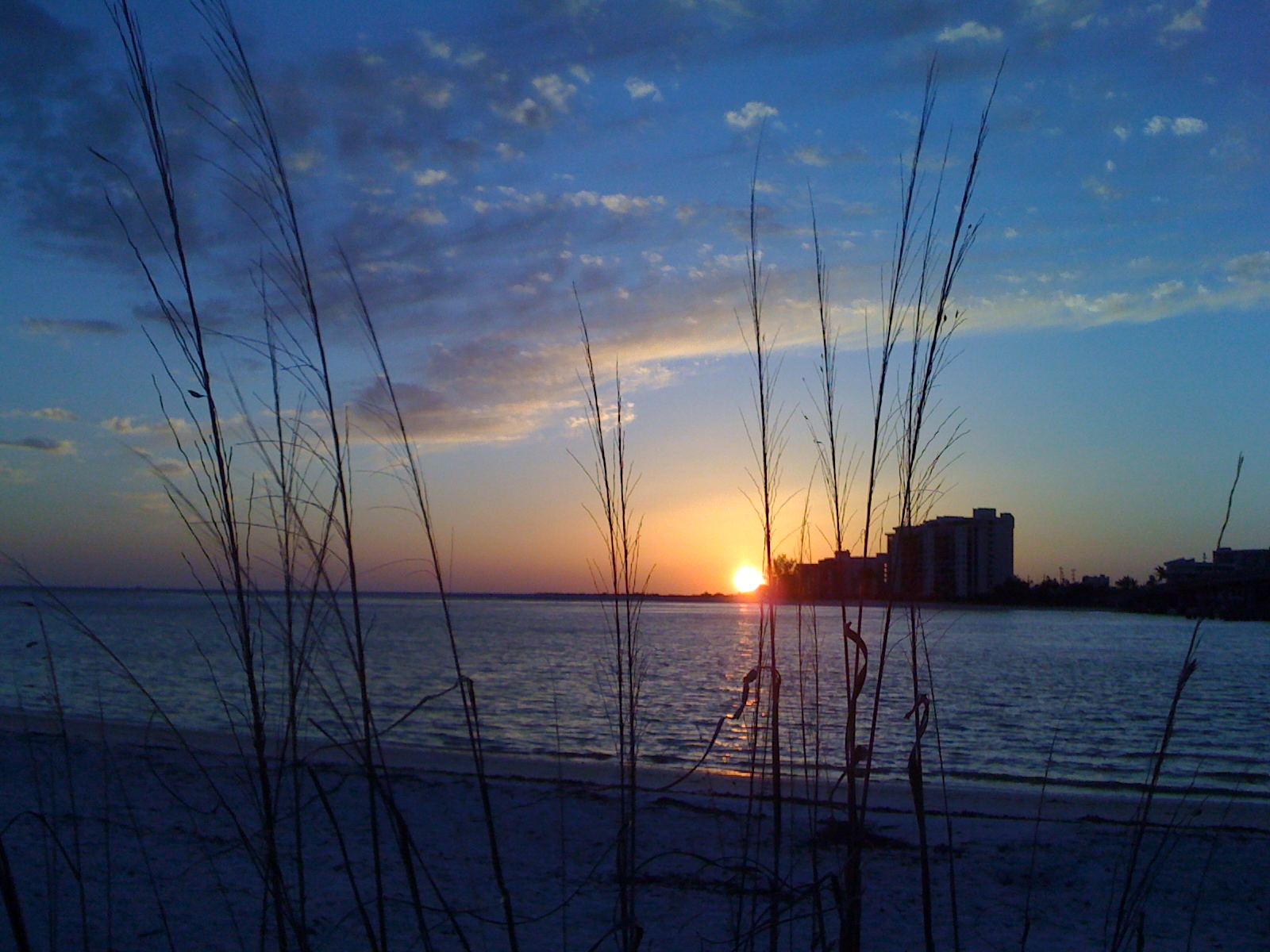
Bonita Springs-Estero

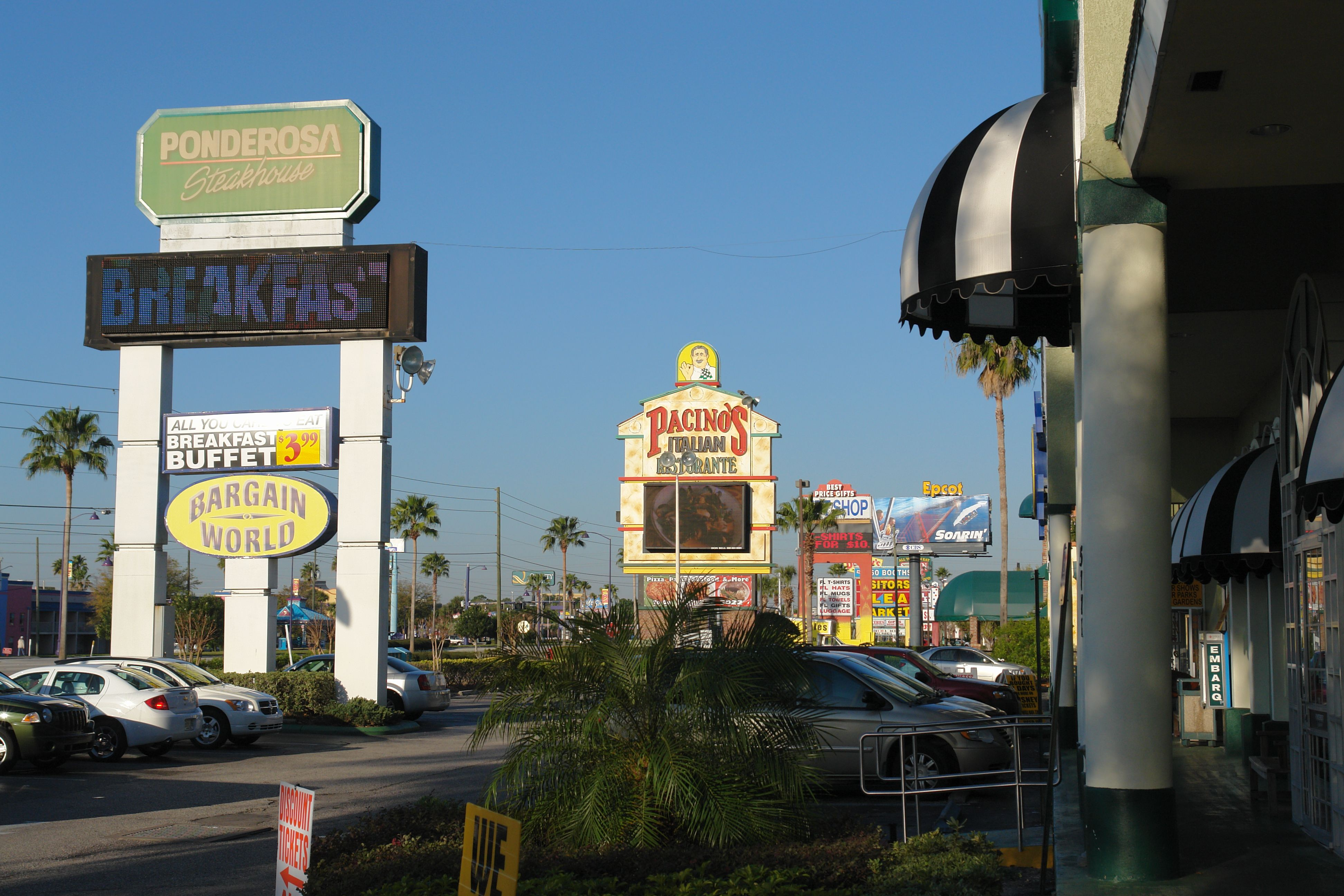
Kissimmee-St.Cloud

The United States Census Bureau defines an Urbanized Area to be "one or more places ('central place') and the adjacent densely settled surrounding territory ('urban fringe') that together have a minimum of 50,000 persons." There are a number of rules specifying what is included in the urban fringe, but it "generally consists of contiguous territory having a density of at least 1,000 persons per square mile". Urbanized Areas often form the cores of Metropolitan Statistical Areas, and as they comprise census tracts rather than local political subdivisions (counties, in Florida), they are generally smaller than the corresponding Metropolitan Statistical Area. A Metropolitan Statistical Area may have more than one Urbanized Area within its boundaries, and an Urbanized Area may extend into more than one Metropolitan Statistical Area. As of 2020, the US Census Bureau has defined thirty-three Urbanized Areas in Florida.

== List ==
The United States Census Bureau defines an Urbanized Area to be "one or more places ('central place') and the adjacent densely settled surrounding territory ('urban fringe') that together have a minimum of 50,000 persons." There are a number of rules specifying what is included in the urban fringe, but it "generally consists of contiguous territory having a density of at least 1,000 persons per square mile". Urbanized Areas often form the cores of Metropolitan Statistical Areas, and, as they comprise census tracts rather than local political subdivisions (counties, in Florida), they are generally smaller than the corresponding Metropolitan Statistical Area. A Metropolitan Statistical Area may have more than one Urbanized Area within its boundaries, and an Urbanized Area may extend into more than one Metropolitan Statistical Area. As of 2020, the US Census Bureau has defined thirty-three Urbanized Areas in Florida.

| Rank | Name | Population in 2020 | Metro Areas | Recent former name(s) |
|---|---|---|---|---|
| 1 | Miami-Fort Lauderdale | 6,077,522 | Miami-Ft. Lauderdale- Pompano Beach Metropolitan Statistical Area | Miami |
| 2 | Tampa-St. Petersburg | 2,783,045 | Tampa-St. Petersburg-Clearwater, Florida Metropolitan Statistical Area | |
| 3 | Orlando | 1,853,896 | Orlando-Kissimmee, Florida, Metropolitan Statistical Area | |
| 4 | Jacksonville | 1,247,374 | Jacksonville Metropolitan Statistical Area | |
| 5 | Bradenton - Sarasota - Venice | 779,075 | North Port–Sarasota–Bradenton metropolitan statistical area and Punta Gorda, Florida Metropolitan Statistical Area | Sarasota - Bradenton |
| 6 | Cape Coral | 599,242 | Cape Coral-Fort Myers, Florida Metropolitan Statistical Area | |
| 7 | Palm Bay-Melbourne | 510,675 | Palm Bay-Melbourne-Titusville, Florida Metropolitan Statistical Area | |
| 8 | Port St. Lucie | 437,745 | Port St. Lucie, Florida Metropolitan Statistical Area | |
| 9 | Bonita Springs - Estero | 425,675 | Naples-Marco Island, Florida Metropolitan Statistical Area and Cape Coral-Fort Myers, Florida Metropolitan Statistical Area | Bonita Springs |
| 10 | Kissimmee - St. Cloud | 418,404 | Orlando-Kissimmee, Florida, Metropolitan Statistical Area | Kissimmee |
| 11 | Daytona Beach - Palm Coast - Port Orange | 402,126 | Deltona-Daytona Beach-Ormond Beach, Florida Metropolitan Statistical Area | Palm Coast - Daytona Beach - Port Orange and Daytona Beach - Port Orange |
| 12 | Pensacola | 390,172 | Pensacola-Ferry Pass-Brent Metropolitan Statistical Area | |
| 13 | Lakeland | 277,915 | Lakeland, Florida Metropolitan Statistical Area | |
| 14 | Winter Haven | 253,251 | Lakeland, Florida Metropolitan Statistical Area | |
| 15 | Tallahassee | 252,934 | Tallahassee, Florida Metropolitan Statistical Area | |
| 16 | Navarre - Miramar Beach - Destin | 226,213 | Fort Walton Beach-Crestview-Destin, Florida Metropolitan Statistical Area and Pensacola-Ferry Pass-Brent, Florida Metropolitan Statistical Area | Fort Walton Beach - Navarre - Wright and Fort Walton Beach |
| 17 | Gainesville | 213,748 | Gainesville, Florida Metropolitan Statistical Area | |
| 18 | Deltona | 210,712 | Deltona-Daytona Beach-Ormond Beach, Florida Metropolitan Statistical Area | |
| 19 | Port Charlotte - North Port | 199,998 | Punta Gorda, Florida Metropolitan Statistical Area and Sarasota-Bradenton-Venice, Florida Metropolitan Statistical Area | North Port - Port Charlotte |
| 20 | Ocala | 182,647 | Ocala, Florida Metropolitan Statistical Area | |
| 21 | Vero Beach - Sebastian | 174,292 | Sebastian-Vero Beach, Florida Metropolitan Statistical Area, Palm Bay-Melbourne-Titusville, Florida Metropolitan Statistical Area and Port St. Lucie, Florida Metropolitan Statistical Area | Sebastian - Vero Beach South - Florida Ridge |
| 22 | Spring Hill | 169,050 | Tampa-St. Petersburg-Clearwater, Florida Metropolitan Statistical Area | Brooksville |
| 23 | Panama City - Panama City Beach | 162,060 | Panama City-Lynn Haven, Florida Metropolitan Statistical Area | Panama City |
| 24 | The Villages - Lady Lake | 161,736 | Orlando-Kissimmee, Florida, Metropolitan Statistical Area, Ocala, Florida Metropolitan Statistical Area and Sumter County | Lady Lake - The Villages and Lady Lake |
| 25 | Leesburg-Eustis-Tavares | 151,523 | Orlando-Kissimmee, Florida, Metropolitan Statistical Area | Leesburg - Eustis |
| 26 | Beverly Hills - Homosassa Springs - Pine Ridge | 96,729 | Homosassa Springs, Florida Metropolitan Statistical Area | Homosassa Springs - Beverly Hills - Citrus Springs |
| 27 | Four Corners | 92,396 | Orlando-Kissimmee, Florida, Metropolitan Statistical Area and Lakeland, Florida metropolitan area | |
| 28 | St. Augustine | 91,786 | Jacksonville Metropolitan Statistical Area | |
| 29 | Sebring-Avon Park | 63,297 | Sebring, Florida Metropolitan Statistical Area | |
| 30 | Titusville | 62,459 | Palm Bay-Melbourne-Titusville, Florida Metropolitan Statistical Area | |
| 31 | Zephyrhills | 55,133 | Tampa-St. Petersburg-Clearwater, Florida Metropolitan Statistical Area | |
| 32 | Poinciana | 53,267 | Orlando-Kissimmee, Florida, Metropolitan Statistical Area and Lakeland, Florida metropolitan area | |
| 33 | Fernandina Beach - Yulee | 50,805 | Jacksonville Metropolitan Statistical Area | |
