= Navarre Beach Fishing Pier =

Pier in Navarre, Florida, United States

- Type: Fishing Pier
- Location: Navarre Beach, Navarre, Florida
- Coordinates: 30.378495°N 86.863475°W

Characteristics
- Total length: 1,545 feet (471 m)
- Clearance below: 30 feet (9.1 m)

History
- Rebuilt: Rebuilt in 2010

The Navarre Beach Fishing Pier is a record-holding fishing pier in Navarre, Florida. At 1,545 feet long, the pier is the longest of its kind in the state. It is the 15th longest public pier of any kind in the United States.

== History ==
The original fishing pier was destroyed in Hurricane Ivan in 2004. The Federal Emergency Management Agency built the new pier in 2010, using concrete construction as opposed to the original's wood, to replace the mostly destroyed structure.

The structure is 30 feet (9.1 meters) above the Gulf of Mexico and is built to survive heavy seas. It has, indeed, survived several Atlantic hurricanes, the largest being Hurricane Sally.

Due to its length, large fish and creatures have been caught from its end, including a particular incident where a great white shark was caught on the pier.

== See also ==
- Navarre, Florida
