= Santa Rosa County Library System =

- Location: United States of America
- Type: County library system
- Established: 2006
- Branches: 6

Access and use
- Population served: 184,313

Other information
- Budget: $1,829,970
- Director: Gwen Wilson

The Santa Rosa County Library System is the primary provider of library services in Santa Rosa County, Florida. It is publicly funded and operated by Santa Rosa County.

In 2020, the Director of Library Services, the official responsible for the management of the agency, was Gwen Wilson. The budget of the agency for 2020 was $1,829,970.

== Branches ==
- Milton Library (Milton)

 Address: 5541 Alabama Street
 Milton, Florida 32570
 Phone: 850-981-READ 
 Website:
 https://www.santarosa.fl.gov/

- The Genealogy Center (Milton)

 Family History & Research Center
 Address: 6275 Dogwood Drive
 Milton, FL 32570 
 Phone: 850-981-READ 
 Website: 
 https://www.santarosa.fl.gov

- Navarre Library (Navarre)

See also, Friends of Navarre Library Website: https://www.facebook.com/profile.php?id=100064316334646&name=

 Address: 8484 James M. Harvell Rd.
 Navarre, Florida 32566
 Phone: 850-981-READ 

- Gulf Breeze Library (Gulf Breeze)

 Address: 1060 Shoreline Dr.
 Gulf Breeze, Florida 32561
 Phone: 850-981-READ 
 Website:
 https://www.santarosa.fl.gov/Directory.aspx?DID=46

- Jay Library (Jay)
- Pace Library (Pace)
