= Buck Pond (McKeever, New York) =

Lake in New York, United States

- Location of Buck Pond within New York
- Location: Herkimer County, New York
- Coordinates: 43°31′58″N 75°03′39″W
- Surface elevation: 1,759 feet (536 m)
- Settlements: North Wilmurt

Buck Pond is a small lake north-northwest of the hamlet of North Wilmurt in Herkimer County, New York. It drains south via an unnamed creek that flows into Woodhull Creek.

== See also ==
- List of lakes in New York
