= Thomas R. King =

American politician

Thomas R. King was chairman of the Democratic Party of Wisconsin.

== Career ==
King chaired the Democratic Party of Wisconsin from 1943 to 1944. During the same period, he was a member of the Democratic National Committee. He was also a delegate to the 1944 Democratic National Convention.
