= Buck Pond (Stillwater, New York) =

Lake in New York, United States

- Location of Buck Pond within New York
- Location: Herkimer County, New York
- Coordinates: 43°59′44″N 75°03′59″W
- Surface elevation: 1,785 feet (544 m)
- Settlements: Moshier Falls

Buck Pond is a small lake north-northeast of the hamlet of Moshier Falls in Herkimer County, New York. It drains west via an unnamed creek that flows into the West Branch Oswegatchie River.

== See also ==
- List of lakes in New York
