= Williams Creek (Florida) =

- Etymology: Williams Family

Location
- Country: United States
- State: Florida

Physical characteristics
- Source
  - location: Wetlands near Naval Outlying Landing Field Holley, Navarre, Florida
  - coordinates: 30.416570°N 86.897686°W
  - elevation: 25 ft (7.6 m)
- Mouth
  - location: Santa Rosa Sound, Navarre, Florida
  - coordinates: 30.398507°N 86.890694°W
  - elevation: 0 ft (0 m)

Williams Creek is a creek in Navarre, Florida. The creek is a tributary body of water to the Santa Rosa Sound. In recent time, the creek has been a subject of advocacy and controversy for the cleaning of local waterways and the preventing of sewage effluent from entering those same waterways.

The creek is named after the Williams Family, who lived in near the creek in the early to mid 19th century.

== See also ==
- East Bay River
