= Buck Pond (Nehasane Lake, New York) =

Small lake in New York

- Location of Buck Pond within New York
- Location: Herkimer County, New York
- Coordinates: 43°58′06″N 74°50′32″W
- Surface elevation: 1,841 feet (561 m)
- Settlements: Keepawa

Buck Pond is a small lake north of the hamlet of Keepawa in Herkimer County, New York. It drains southeast via an unnamed creek that flows into Alder Creek.

== See also ==
- List of lakes in New York
