= Buck Pond (Navarre, Florida) =

- Location within Florida
- Location: Eglin Air Force Base; Navarre, Florida
- Coordinates: 30°33′05″N 86°54′29″W
- Type: Reservoir
- Part of: Yellow River Basin
- Primary outflows: Double Head Branch
- Managing agency: United States Air Force
- Settlements: Navarre, Florida (6 Miles South); Milton, Florida (8 Miles northwest)

Buck Pond is a small reservoir on Eglin Air Force Base, southeast of Milton, Florida and north of Navarre, Florida.

The pond is reportedly fishable and accessible for members of the general public with prior permits and permission from Eglin Air Force Base.
