= Buck Pond (Big Moose, New York) =

Lake in Herkimer County, New York, United States

- Location of Buck Pond within New York
- Location: Herkimer County, New York
- Coordinates: 43°49′19″N 74°55′48″W
- Surface area: 22 acres (8.9 ha)
- Max. depth: 35 ft (11 m)
- Surface elevation: 2,024 feet (617 m)
- Settlements: Big Moose

Buck Pond is a small lake west-northwest of the hamlet of Big Moose in Herkimer County, New York. It drains northwest via an unnamed creek that flows into Twitchell Creek. It is privately owned by Wren’s Woods LLC.

== See also ==
- List of lakes in New York
