= Axelson Point =

Axelson Point Diana's Point
- Cape
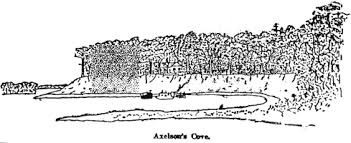
- A sketch of Axelson Point made in 1915
- Interactive map of Axelson Point
- Coordinates: 30.452323°N 86.928735°W
- Range: Gulf Coastal Plain
- Part of: Fairpoint Peninsula
- Offshore water bodies: East Lagoon (East Bay)
- Operator: Robledal Estates neighborhood (and various homeowners)
- Elevation: 2.1 m (7 ft)
- Etymology: Axelson Family

Axelson Point is a small cape along the shore of the East Bay in Navarre, Florida. The point is sometimes mistakenly called Diana's Point by local residents, though the origin of this is unclear.

The point is named after the Axelson Family, one of the first families permanently residing in Navarre. The point only extends less than a hundred meters into the bay. The Axelsons operated a shipyard on the point, using lumber from Miller Point across the bay.

The point is historically significant, not only due to it being the home of the previously mentioned Axelson family, but also due to it being one of the first landing spots for exploration in the area. Some of the Pensacola homes of the original Axelson family still stand today; however, none of the homes on Axelson Point are from the original family.

Axelson Point, together with Miller Point, make up the mouth of East Lagoon, the river-like eastern reaches of East Bay.
