= East Bay River =

River in Florida, United States

Coordinates: 30.440°N 86.863°W

East Bay River The River Jordan, Chester River
- The East Bay River (here listed as El Rio Jordan, or the River Jordan) on a 1700s Spanish map of the area
- Etymology: East Bay
- Nicknames: The Red River, East River

Location
- Country: United States of America
- State: Florida
- Region: Santa Rosa County/Okaloosa County
- Municipality: Navarre, Mary Esther, Valparaiso

Physical characteristics
- Source
  - location: Hurlburt Field, Mary Esther, Florida, United States of America
  - elevation: 31 ft (9.4 m)
- Mouth
  - location: East Bay, Navarre, Florida, United States of America
  - elevation: 0 ft (0 m)
- Length: 15 mi (24 km)
- Discharge
  - average: 40 cu ft/s (1.1 m^{3}/s)

Basin features
- Tributaries
  - left: Several unnamed creeks
  - right: Panther Creek, Alligator Creek, and several other unnamed creeks

The East Bay River (also called the East River and historically known as The River Jordan or the Chester River) in Florida is a 15-mile-long (24 km) river located in Santa Rosa and Okaloosa counties. It flows from east to west, forming near Hurlburt Field, and empties into the eastern portion of East Bay (Florida) near the towns Holley and Navarre. The river forms part of the southern boundary of Eglin Air Force Base.

There is one public boat launch ramp located on the river, along State Road 87 in Holley, near the outlet into Pensacola Bay.

Named tributaries include Alligator Creek, and Panther Creek.

The average discharge rate is 40 cubic feet per second.

== The Legend ==
According to a popular legend, Ponce de León discovered Florida while searching for the "Source of Eternal Youth." Although legends of waters capable of restoring youth and vitality were widespread on both sides of the Atlantic Ocean for many years before Ponce de León, the account of his search for these waters was not attributed to him until after his death. In his Historia General y Natural de las Indias of 1535, Gonzalo Fernández de Oviedo wrote that Ponce de León was searching for Bimini's waters in the hope of curing his sexual impotence. Then, in 1575, Hernando de Escalante Fontaneda, who survived a shipwreck, found himself living for 17 years with the indigenous people of Florida (in the "JordanRiver") . , published his memoirs, in which he placed the Fountain in Florida, and reported that Ponce de León had probably looked for it there. Although Fontaneda doubted that de León had actually travelled to Florida with the intention of seeking the Source, this account was included in Antonio de Herrera y Tordesillas's Historia general de los hechos de los Castellanos (1615).
