= Holley, Florida =

- Census-designated place
- Location within Florida Location within the United States
- Coordinates: 30°26′59″N 86°53′09″W
- Country: United States
- State: Florida
- County: Santa Rosa

Area
  - Total: 4.594 sq mi (11.90 km^{2})
  - Land: 3.549 sq mi (9.19 km^{2})
  - Water: 1.045 sq mi (2.71 km^{2})
- Elevation: 30 ft (9.1 m)

Population (2020)
  - Total: 2,484
  - Density: 699.9/sq mi (270.2/km^{2})
- Time zone: UTC-6 (Central (CST))
  - Summer (DST): UTC-5 (CDT)
- ZIP code: 32566
- Area code: 850
- GNIS feature ID: 2629557

Holley is an unincorporated community and census-designated place in Santa Rosa County, Florida, United States. Its population was 2,484 as of the 2020 census. It is part of the Pensacola—Ferry Pass—Brent, Florida Metropolitan Statistical Area. Florida State Road 87 passes through the community.

For almost all cases, the community of Holley, is considered to be a neighborhood or character area of the larger community of Navarre, Florida. This includes the community of Holley being included in the federally designated Holley-Navarre Census County Division, being served by the Holley-Navarre Fire District and Holley-Navarre Water System, and being included in the county election precinct exclusively designated for Navarre. Major neighborhoods in Holley include Holley Village, Muddy Ford, Harper, and Miller Point.

== Geography ==
According to the U.S. Census Bureau, the community has an area of 4.594 square miles (11.90 km^{2}); 3.549 square miles (9.19 km^{2}) of its area is land, and 1.045 square miles (2.71 km^{2}) is water.

== Demographics ==
Holley first appeared as a census designated place in the 2010 U.S. census.

=== 2020 census ===
As of the 2020 census, Holley had a population of 2,484, up from 1,630 at the 2010 census. The median age was 36.5 years. 27.0% of residents were under the age of 18 and 13.6% of residents were 65 years of age or older. For every 100 females there were 103.8 males, and for every 100 females age 18 and over there were 102.0 males age 18 and over.

12.5% of residents lived in urban areas, while 87.5% lived in rural areas.

There were 883 households in Holley, of which 40.9% had children under the age of 18 living in them. Of all households, 62.4% were married-couple households, 15.2% were households with a male householder and no spouse or partner present, and 16.9% were households with a female householder and no spouse or partner present. About 18.4% of all households were made up of individuals and 7.4% had someone living alone who was 65 years of age or older.

There were 950 housing units, of which 7.1% were vacant. The homeowner vacancy rate was 2.5% and the rental vacancy rate was 3.3%.

Racial composition as of the 2020 census
| Race | Number | Percent |
|---|---|---|
| White | 1,998 | 80.4% |
| Black or African American | 97 | 3.9% |
| American Indian and Alaska Native | 16 | 0.6% |
| Asian | 72 | 2.9% |
| Native Hawaiian and Other Pacific Islander | 8 | 0.3% |
| Some other race | 45 | 1.8% |
| Two or more races | 248 | 10.0% |
| Hispanic or Latino (of any race) | 174 | 7.0% |
