= East Bay (Santa Rosa County, Florida) =

Bay in Santa Rosa County, Florida

- Galvez Bay
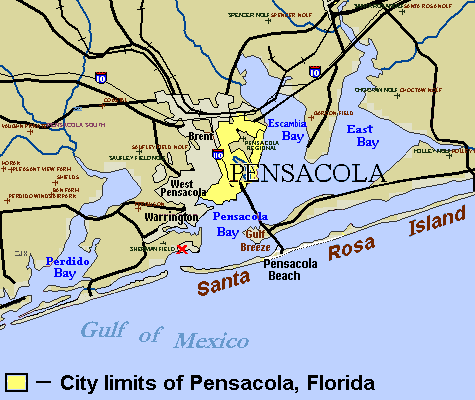
- East Bay (upper right) is east of Pensacola, Florida and Escambia Bay.

- Location: Santa Rosa County, Florida
- Coordinates: 30°32′N 87°01′W
- Type: Bay

East Bay is a bay located in the far western Florida Panhandle. Unusually, East Bay is connected to open waters via Pensacola Bay to its southwest. The bay is fed primarily by the Blackwater River and the East Bay River.

== East Lagoon ==
The east side of East Bay is pinched into a wide river-like shape (often referred to as East Lagoon on historical maps, though the name is no longer commonly used) until eventually becoming an actual river at East Bay River. The Lagoon starts where the bay is met by Axelson Point and Miller Point.

== History ==
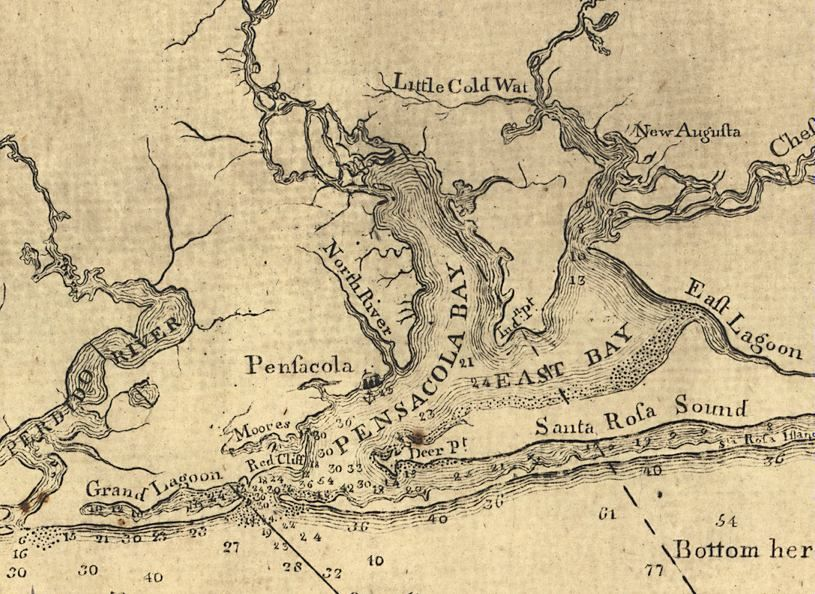
1781 map depicting East Bay and the East Lagoon, the river-like east side of East Bay

European exploration of the bay likely occurred as early as Pensacola's establishment in the early 16th century.

The bay has been included in most major maps of the bay system and harbor, dating back to that era. Between its first mapping and the present day, the bay has been listed under several different names, primarily Oyster Cove, Galvez Bay, and East Bay.

During Hurricane Ivan's landfall in September 2004, the storm surge from the Gulf of Mexico came into East Bay, flooding the shoreline of the bay.
