= Navarre, Florida =

Census-designated place and unincorporated community in Florida, US

- Census-designated place
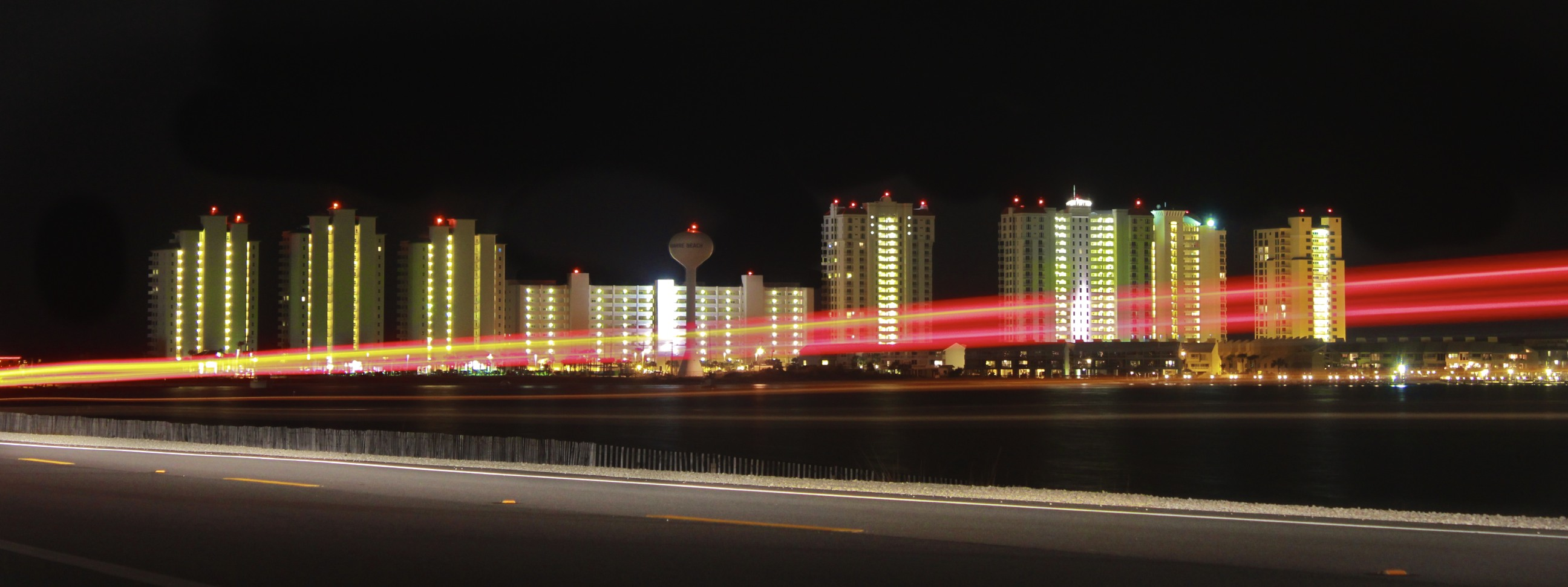
- Navarre Beach Skyline

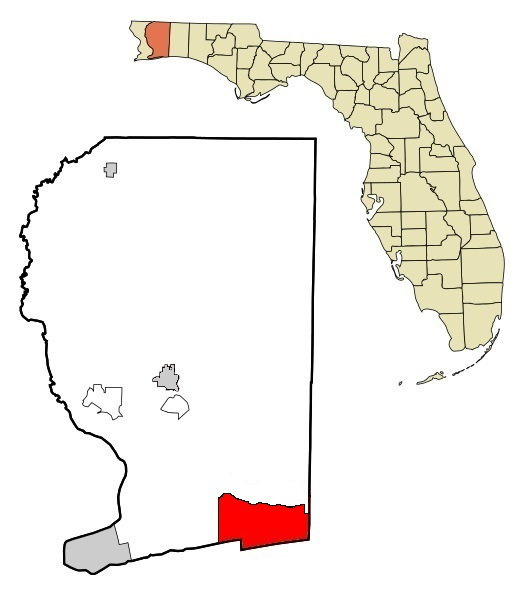
- Location in Santa Rosa County and the U.S. state of Florida
- Coordinates: 30°25′03″N 86°51′46″W
- Country: United States
- State: Florida
- County: Santa Rosa
- First explored: 1693
- Settled: 1856
- Founded: 1925
- Founder: Guy Wyman
- Named for: Province in Spain, Navarre

Area
  - Census-designated place: 29.33 sq mi (75.96 km^{2})
  - Land: 23.07 sq mi (59.75 km^{2})
  - Water: 6.27 sq mi (16.24 km^{2})
- Elevation: 30 ft (9.1 m)

Population (2020)
  - Census-designated place: 41,940
  - Density: 950.89/sq mi (367.14/km^{2})
  - Urban (Navarre–Miramar Beach–Destin, FL): 226,213 (US: 173rd)
  - Urban density: 1,891.1/sq mi (730.2/km^{2})
  - Metro: 509,905 (US: 110th)
- Demonym(s): Navarreian, Navarrite
- Time zone: UTC−6 (CST)
  - Summer (DST): UTC−5 (CDT)
- ZIP Code: 32566
- Area codes: 850/448
- FIPS code: 12-48050
- GNIS feature ID: 2404435

Navarre is a census-designated place and unincorporated community in Santa Rosa County in the northwestern Florida Panhandle, United States. It is a major bedroom community for mostly U.S. military personnel, federal civil servants, local population, retirees and defense contractors. Due to Navarre Beach and the 4 miles (6.4 km) of beach front on the Gulf of Mexico thereof, as well as several miles of beaches within the Navarre Beach Marine Park and the Gulf Islands National Seashore, it has a small, but rapidly growing community of nature enthusiasts and tourists. Navarre has grown from being a small town of around 1,500 in 1970 to a town with a population estimated at 43,540 as of 2022, if including both the Navarre and Navarre Beach Census Designated Places. The Navarre CDP recorded a population of 40,817 at the 2020 census.

Navarre is about 25 miles (40 km) east of Pensacola and about 15 miles (24 km) west of Fort Walton Beach. The community is roughly centered on the junction of U.S. Route 98 and State Road 87. It is part of the Pensacola–Ferry Pass–Brent, Florida Metropolitan Statistical Area (more commonly referred to as the Pensacola Metro Area), and is the second largest community in the metropolitan area, according to a study. Navarre is the third-largest community in the Florida Panhandle.

Navarre is the principal community of the census-defined Navarre-Miramar Beach-Destin Urbanized Area. The community is known for the natural environment, swimming, picnic spots, and its beach.

== History ==
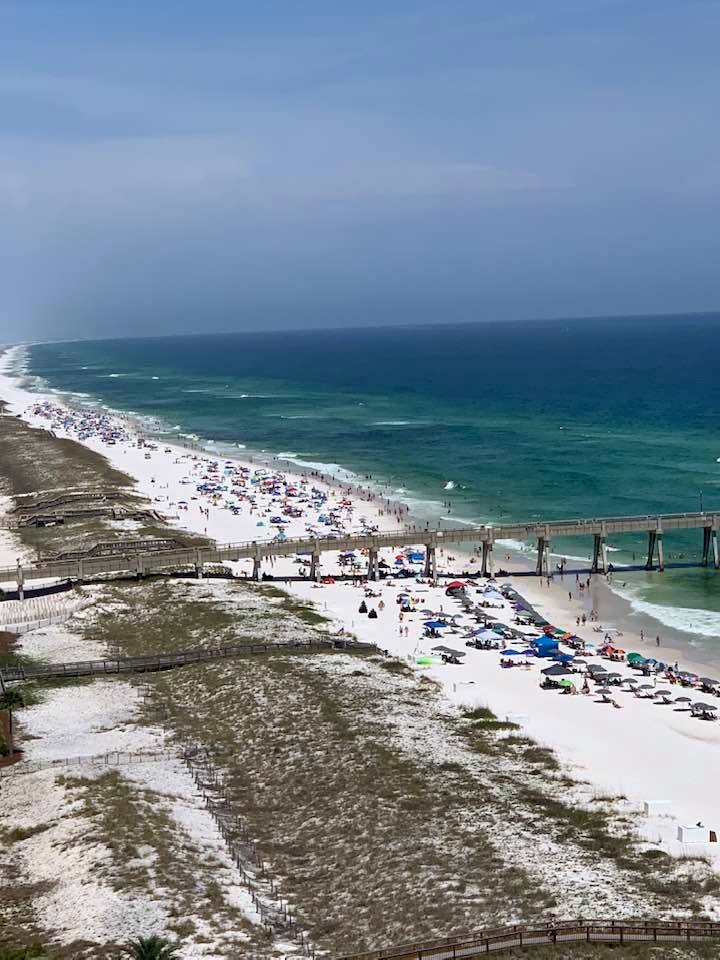
A busy day on Navarre Beach

=== Early Exploration ===
In 1693, Spanish explorers Carlos de Sigüenza y Góngora and Admiral Andrés de Pez y Malzárraga became the first recorded Europeans to explore what is, today, Navarre. Sigüenza was responsible for scouting and mapping possible sites of Spanish colonization in Northwest Florida during the expedition. While traveling in the area of East Bay in April 1693 the Spanish discovered what is today called the East Bay River. In honor of Captain Jordan de Reina, an officer serving in the expedition, the Spanish dubbed the waters on which they traveled, "The River Jordan".

On April 11, 1693, while sailing up East Bay River, sailors aboard the Spanish ships noticed a group of Native Americans observing from a camp near the shore. In order to greet the natives, a landing party was sent out. By the time the Spanish reached the shore, however, the Native Americans were gone. As the Natives quickly abandoned camp the Spanish discovered half-cooked pieces of buffalo meat sitting over a fire, along with a fierce dog guarding the site. Due to the great number of oak trees in the area the campsite was named "El Robledal," meaning "The Oakgrove" in Spanish. Neighborhoods in the area of this event still retain the El Robledal name. After erecting a wooden cross and leaving gifts for the natives, the Spaniards continued their exploration upriver. Upon later return to El Robledal, the explorers noticed that their gifts had been taken. In return, the natives had also constructed a wooden cross and left a buffalo hide as a peace offering. The earliest known map of Robledal dates from 1693, the same year as the Pez-Sigüenza Expedition. Subsequent maps in 1698 continue to note the area today known as Navarre as Robledal.

=== Axelson Point and early settlement ===
==== Settlement and shipyard ====
White settlers are noted as living in the area since at least 1827, when a map of West Florida includes listings of families by the name of Wyman and Williams living along Santa Rosa Sound in what would become Navarre. The Wyman family is believed to be related to Guy Wyman, who, along with his wife, would name the area "Navarre" and is now generally recognized as the town founder. The Williams family is likely the source of the name of William's Creek.

While various settlers had been present in the area since before this time, Robledal was again populated sometime near 1856, with the establishment of a homestead by the Axelson Family. Due to the relative lack of information on the other families, as well as their homestead's location at Robledal, they are often considered Navarre's first settlers. Their home was along the shore of the East Bay, on a small cape, in which, they are now the namesake, after the point was officially designated, Axelson Point.

Soon after their settlement in what would become Navarre, they established a shipyard on Axelson Point, jutting into what was also then called, Axelson Cove. The shipyard was considered to be mostly successful, as the family made a business of fixing ships in port in the nearby deep-water port in Pensacola and the river port in Milton, as well as building large-scale ships of their own. The shipyard was in operation until approximately 1890.

==== Civil War ====
During the Civil War, despite the political ideology of citizens in the area, records make it seem as though the Axelsons were pro-union. This is substantiated by a record showing that, while many businesses in the area were becoming ruined due to the Union blockade of southern ports, the Axelsons' shipyard was quite busy and prosperous, primarily from business completed with the Union navy and the United States Merchant Marines. This notion is conflicted with local tradition noted in Log of the Peep O'Day, an account of the area from the 1910s, which suggest that the Axelsons built one of the first ships registered under the flag of the Confederacy. However, as confirmed by evidence gathered by historians at the University of West Florida, this notion was likely caused by a confusion between the Axelsons and shipbuilding operations in nearby Milton.

In addition, some records and books, such as the Atlas of Florida, attest that Union raids were made against Confederate troops and camps stationed elsewhere in Northwest Florida, through routes in what would become Navarre and Holley. No evidence exists that the Axelsons assisted such missions. A military road that appears to approximate this route is noted as existing as late as 1895, where it can be found on War Department maps from that time period.

==== Bilowry and Hiawatha ====
Some maps of the area during this time, seem to indicate that the area was also known as “Bilowry,” a presumed misspelling or combination of the name, Bill Lowry. The area also had a post office under this name from 1886 to 1891.

Habitation of this area of what is now Navarre was continuous, though sparse from the Axelsons to the platting of Navarre. This area also came to be known as Hiawatha during a brief time, with a neighborhood in Navarre still retaining this name.

=== Town of Eagan ===
Some 30 years after the first homestead in the area was established, seemingly coinciding with the community of Bilowry, a small settlement named Eagan arose in 1874. The post office was run by Patrick Shea, a naturalized American from Ireland. The settlement, composed of approximately 40 families, was located off the Santa Rosa Sound and encompassed a portion of present-day Navarre. The settlement, which formerly existed as a post office location, was named after a local postmaster, John Eagan Esq., a Pensacola lawyer and politician. Following the post office's discontinuation on September 11, 1884, families continued to live in the area, and the town continued to appear on area maps even into the 1890s. While what became of the town and the people who lived there at that time is unknown (some of which are known to have remained in the town, some of which are believed to have moved to neighboring communities), the discovery of the town's existence definitively established the settlement of the Navarre area in South Santa Rosa County as being prior to the 20th century. The land upon which Eagan existed would, in fact, later become what is now known as Navarre.

=== Guy Wyman and town development ===
The founder of Navarre, under the name of Navarre, was Guy Wyman, a colonel in the United States Army. During World War I, he met a French nurse named Noelle. At the time, immigration policies would not allow him to bring her to the United States as a fiancée or even as a wife, but he could bring her back as his legal child. Colonel Wyman, therefore, adopted her and brought her back to the Florida panhandle, where he purchased a large amount of land. Noelle named their holdings Navarre, after the province in Spain, near France. Wyman platted the town in 1925, but made no steps towards development. However, during the Great Depression, the Wymans could not pay the taxes on it and were forced to begin selling it off. Part of that property is where the Navarre Park is today.

Navarre appeared with its modern name, though spelled Neverre, on a 1926 region map created by the Louisville and Nashville Railroad.

Gary Roberts, a nephew of founder Guy Wyman, helped to develop the town even further from 1933 to his death in 1941. Roberts created a path from his home in Navarre to his timber yard in Holley, Florida. This portion of road later become a part of Florida State Road 87.

=== Modern era ===
Most of the scenes in Jaws 2 were filmed in and around Navarre and Navarre Beach in 1977. The production "was a boost to the local economy because local boaters, extras and stand-ins or doubles were hired."

In the 21st Century, Navarre has become one of the fastest-growing communities in Florida. While protecting and enhancing the natural environment of the area; many steps have been taken to develop luxury accommodations, water activities, boutique shopping, scenic trails, schools and nature/educational opportunities.

==== Hurricanes Ivan and Dennis ====
Navarre has been impacted significantly by hurricanes. Immediately preceding Hurricane Ivan and Hurricane Dennis, Navarre was seeing a new strand of growth and economic advancement. This, however, quickly came to a close, as Navarre suffered horribly during the events of those hurricanes. Many planned developments stopped and decided to delay their plans until a later date, many of which were never resumed or completed. This hard mark against Navarre lingered until the mid and late 2010s.

==== Helicopter crash ====
On March 10, 2015, a UH-60, call sign MOJO 69, from the Louisiana National Guard, crashed in the Santa Rosa Sound off the coast of the community of Navarre. All eleven on board were believed killed. On November 18, 2016, Leadership Santa Rosa Class 29 unveiled the Navarre Black Hawk Memorial in Navarre Park. The memorial was built to honor the men who died in the Black Hawk crash and anyone who has paid the ultimate sacrifice in service to the United States.

==== Protests ====
2017 and 2018 had seen a noticeable rise in civil activism in the Navarre area, with three notable protests occurring, all within the span of 12 months.

The first protests recorded in the community occurred on June 9, 2017, after the county unilaterally changed the town's nickname and locally popular welcome sign. The change was made without the consent of the citizens of the town and have sparked additional calls for the incorporation of the community as a municipality.

In 2018, there were protests against the Holley-Navarre Water System. The protests were over the water system's potential violations of the Florida Sunshine Law, which guarantees the rights for citizens and residents to access the meetings and public records of government agencies. The alleged violations occurred when the board of directors of the agency met for what they called a "secret" meeting. The board president stated these meetings were closed due to their nature of discussing legal matters between members of the board and of several attorneys and lawyers. A new board was later elected, largely defusing the situation. The water system has subsequently received criticism after the new water board appointed a former Santa Rosa County commissioner who had just been voted out of his seat a month before his hiring. A later CEO of the water system was dismissed after undisclosed felony charges were discovered.

The third notable protests were part of the larger national school walkout to promote gun control.

On June 3, 2020, there was a protest at Navarre Park as part of the George Floyd protests. It consisted of around 120 protestors and was followed by a candlelight vigil at the main pavilion of the park.

==== Growth and incorporation efforts ====
For the first time since before hurricanes Ivan and Dennis, Navarre is now not only expanding in population, but in attractions, dining establishments, and other tourist options as well. In the late 2010s, Navarre saw the construction and opening of several major housing and apartment complexes, a brand new hotel, retail stores, several new restaurants and Santa Rosa County's first microbrewery. Expansion has since continued with the construction of additional retail and box stores, residential complexes, and entertainment centers near the community's central business district. New development was announced in 2020 that would additionally expand commercial options on the east side of the community.

In 2020, following a failed effort in 2014, a new effort in incorporating has been established by a local political action committee, the Navarre Area United PAC. However, the PAC was delayed in collecting petition signatories to get the issue of incorporation on the ballot due to the COVID-19 outbreak. They had been expected to resume collecting signatures after the pandemic, but had been delayed by stalling from local legislators. Continuing the cause in 2021, the Preserve Navarre campaign began to conduct research regarding the feasibility of Navarre incorporation. Therefore, once again possibly reviving the political question for the future. The latter group since released a feasibility study (later updated according to local feedback) and a proposed charter. In October 2024, a quickly organized straw poll organized by the committee through a private election firm failed to reach 50% approval of voters. While concerns, including a small turnout, continued regarding whether the poll adequately demonstrated the community's opinion on the proposal, the organization dropped the effort.

In May 2023, the Highway 98 widening project has begun in select areas of Navarre, specifically east of Highway 87. The project consists of drainage improvements, sidewalks, and adding 3 lanes to both eastbound and westbound lanes. While the end date has not been announced, it is expected to be finished in the 2026/27 timeframe.

== Geography ==
=== Location ===
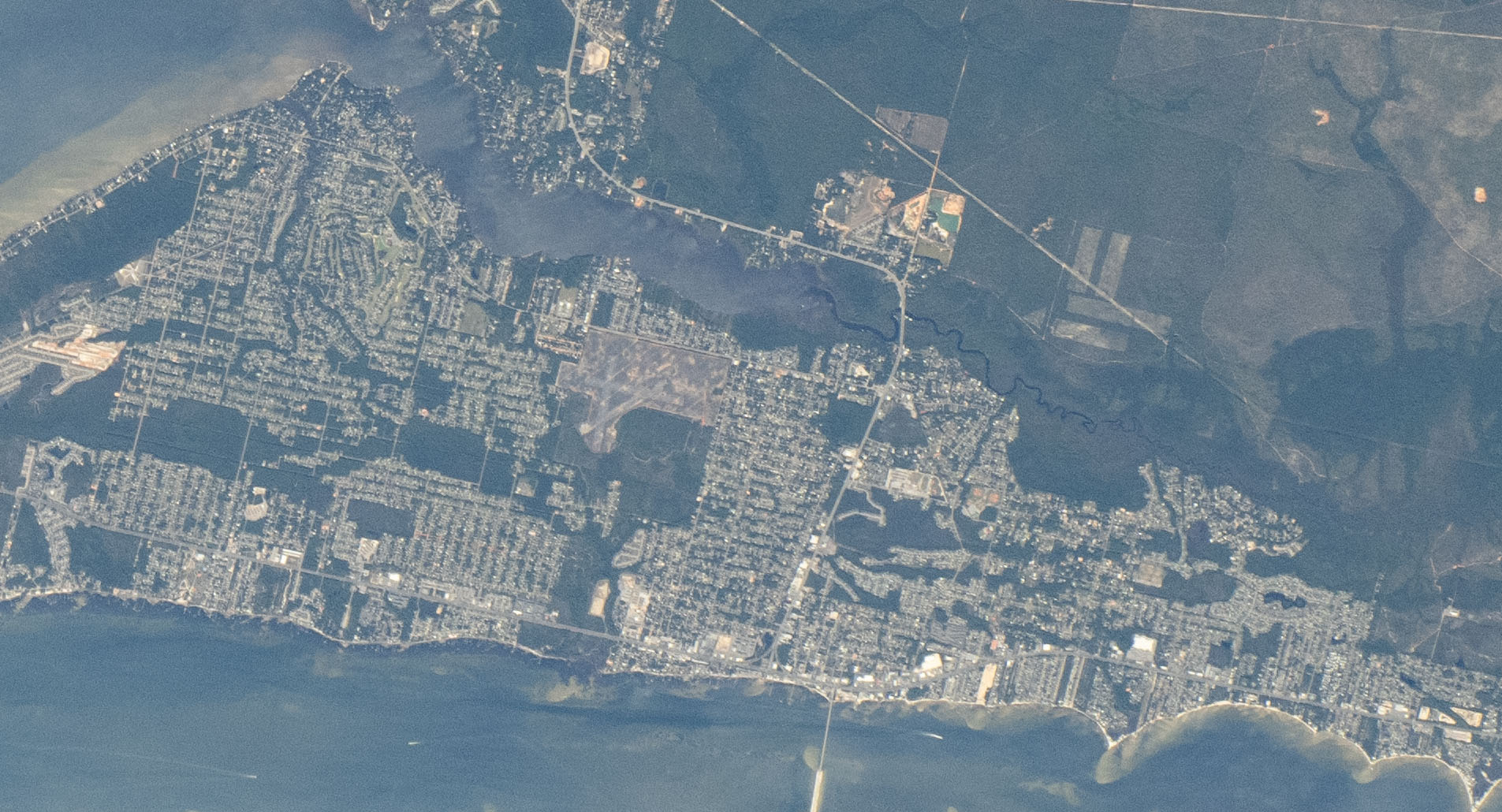
View from ISS Expedition 72, November 2024

Navarre is located on roughly 12 miles (19 km) of shoreline along the Gulf of Mexico.

=== Topography ===
The community of Navarre is located on the Gulf Coastal Plain and is built on mostly flat sandy soil, though there are a few shallow hills. Navarre is primarily located on the Fairpoint Peninsula and Santa Rosa Island. Navarre is bounded geographically in the north by the East Bay River, the Yellow River, and several creeks and on the south by the Santa Rosa Sound. Holley, a different census-designated place that is sometimes considered part of Navarre, is north of the Fairpoint Peninsula, across the East Bay River.

=== Climate ===
The town is located towards the southern edge of the humid subtropical climate zone.

Climate data for Pensacola, Florida normals (Nearest weather station to Navarre)
Month	Jan	Feb	Mar	Apr	May	Jun	Jul	Aug	Sep	Oct	Nov	Dec	Year
Record high °F (°C)	81 (27)	82 (28)	88 (31)	96 (36)	102 (39)	102 (39)	106 (41)	104 (40)	102 (39)	95 (35)	87 (31)	81 (27)	106 (41)
Mean daily maximum °F (°C)	60.5 (15.8)	63.8 (17.7)	69.6 (20.9)	75.7 (24.3)	83.2 (28.4)	88.5 (31.4)	90.0 (32.2)	89.4 (31.9)	86.5 (30.3)	78.9 (26.1)	70.3 (21.3)	62.6 (17.0)	76.6 (24.8)
Mean daily minimum °F (°C)	42.2 (5.7)	45.5 (7.5)	51.2 (10.7)	57.6 (14.2)	66.0 (18.9)	72.5 (22.5)	74.5 (23.6)	74.2 (23.4)	70.3 (21.3)	60.3 (15.7)	51.2 (10.7)	44.4 (6.9)	59.2 (15.1)
Record low °F (°C)	5 (−15)	7 (−14)	22 (−6)	33 (1)	44 (7)	55 (13)	61 (16)	60 (16)	43 (6)	32 (0)	22 (−6)	11 (−12)	5 (−15)
Average precipitation inches (mm)	4.64 (118)	5.06 (129)	5.81 (148)	4.32 (110)	4.17 (106)	6.60 (168)	7.40 (188)	6.77 (172)	5.98 (152)	5.24 (133)	4.73 (120)	4.55 (116)	65.27 (1,658)
Average precipitation days (≥ 0.01 in)	8.9	8.6	8.1	6.5	6.7	11.1	14.0	13.6	8.8	6.1	7.2	9.0	108.6
Source: NOAA

==== Hurricanes ====
As a low-elevation community near the Gulf of Mexico, Navarre is often threatened by hurricanes. Significant damage was incurred as a result of hurricanes Erin and Opal in 1995, Georges in 1998, Ivan in 2004, Dennis in 2005 and Sally in 2020. Many homes and businesses immediately along Santa Rosa Sound (generally south of U.S. Highway 98) suffered storm surge as a result of those storms. Recoveries have been rendered by the area with the population quickly flourishing. This area of Florida is consistently listed as one of the worst places for hurricanes.

=== Navarre Beach ===
Entrance sign for Navarre Beach

Navarre Beach is the beach neighborhood of Navarre and is, as of the 2010 census, its own census designated place. It is on Santa Rosa Island, a barrier island in the Gulf of Mexico. The 2020 population of the CDP is 1,123, up from 638 at the 2010 census.

Immediately to its east is Navarre Beach Marine Park, a former Florida state park. Immediately to its west is a portion of the Gulf Islands National Seashore, and farther west is the community of Pensacola Beach.

==== Recent history ====
In 2006, a "beach re-nourishment" project was begun, restoring sand lost due to the hurricanes of 2004 and 2005. This project eventually added approximately 200 feet (61 m) of sand and a 14-foot (4.3 m) high berm to the Gulf side of Santa Rosa Island for the entire length of Navarre Beach. The project was completed in December 2006. Another round of beach re-nourishment was completed in 2016.

== Demographics ==
Historical population
Census	Pop.	Note	%±
1970	1,500		—
1990	8,673		—
2000	19,255		122.0%
2010	31,378		63.0%
2020	40,817		30.1%
2022 (est.)	43,540	▲	6.7%
Includes both Navarre and Navarre Beach CDP

Navarre first appeared as a census designated place in the 2010 U.S. census.

=== 2020 census ===
As of the 2020 census, Navarre had a population of 40,817. The median age was 37.9 years. 24.3% of residents were under the age of 18 and 13.2% of residents were 65 years of age or older. For every 100 females there were 99.8 males, and for every 100 females age 18 and over there were 98.1 males age 18 and over.

100.0% of residents lived in urban areas, while 0.0% lived in rural areas.

There were 14,978 households in Navarre, of which 36.3% had children under the age of 18 living in them. Of all households, 62.2% were married-couple households, 14.5% were households with a male householder and no spouse or partner present, and 17.5% were households with a female householder and no spouse or partner present. About 18.3% of all households were made up of individuals and 6.2% had someone living alone who was 65 years of age or older.

There were 15,955 housing units, of which 6.1% were vacant. The homeowner vacancy rate was 1.1% and the rental vacancy rate was 5.9%.

Racial composition as of the 2020 census
Race	Number	Percent
White	30,659	75.1%
Black or African American	2,686	6.6%
American Indian and Alaska Native	270	0.7%
Asian	1,332	3.3%
Native Hawaiian and Other Pacific Islander	128	0.3%
Some other race	1,243	3.0%
Two or more races	4,499	11.0%
Hispanic or Latino (of any race)	3,870	9.5%

=== Population estimates ===
Navarre is a large community. Post-2020 estimates place the population as high as 43,540. If the town of Navarre was to be incorporated it would be the largest city between Pensacola and Tallahassee (based on population). This is a major increase from just 40 years ago, when the population was hovering around 1,500.

== Arts and culture ==
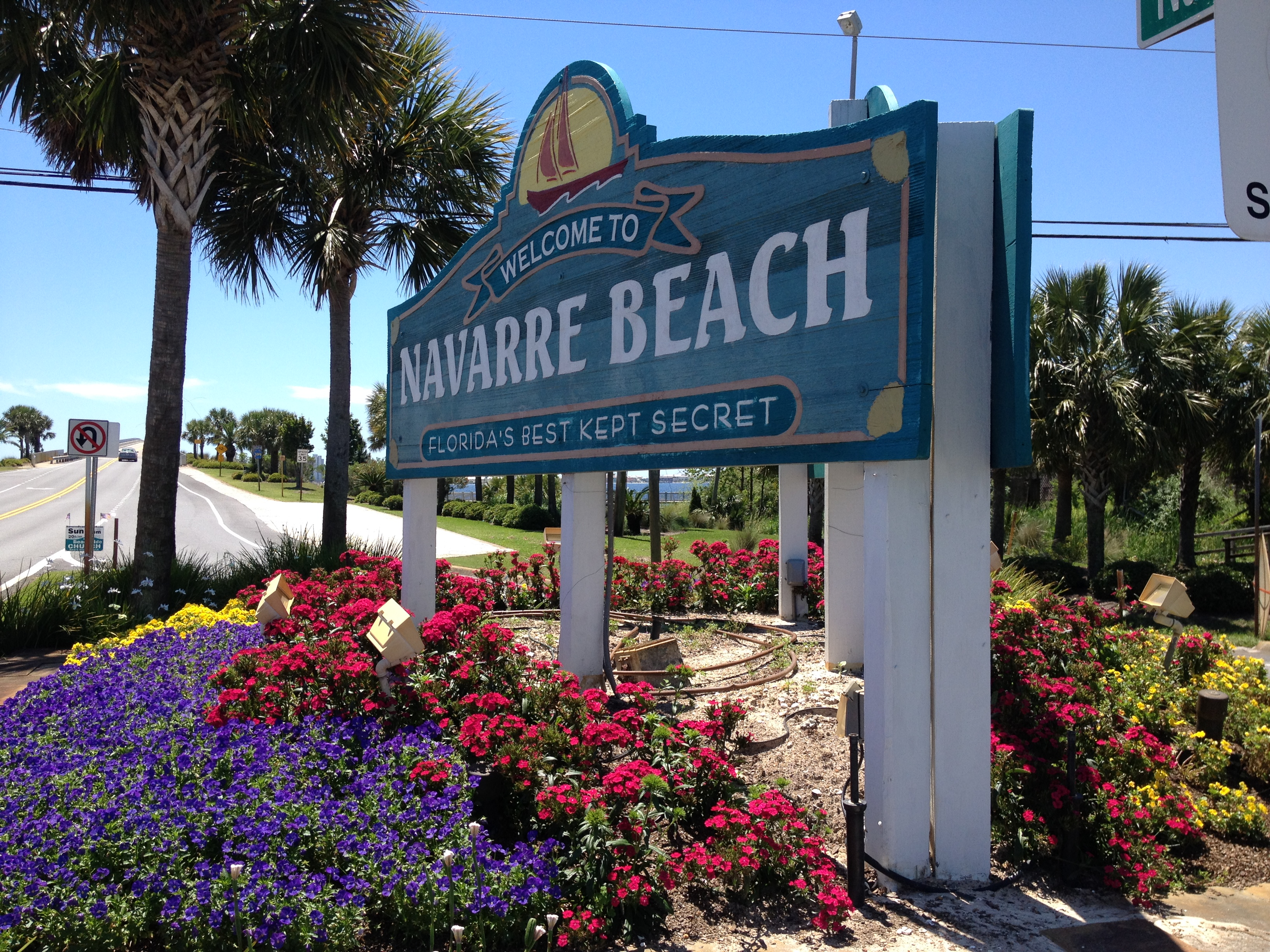
The old Navarre Beach sign in the spring time

Tourism has increased in the Navarre area since 2010.

Local attractions include Emerald Coast Wildlife Refuge, Navarre Beach Marine Science Station, Navarre Beach Sea Turtle Conservation Center, Sandspur Wildlife Sanctuary, and the Navarre Beach Marine Life Sanctuary.

The Navarre Beach Fishing Pier is 1,545 feet (471 m), and is the longest fishing pier on the Gulf of Mexico and in the state of Florida.

Public library services are provided by the Santa Rosa County Library System through the Navarre Library.

== Parks and recreation ==
Parks and recreational facilities include Navarre Beach Marine Park, Navarre Sports Complex, and Navarre Park, which features a playground, basketball courts, and picnic pavilions.

== Education ==
Education in Navarre is administrated by the Santa Rosa County School District. Schools serving the Navarre community are:

- Navarre High School
- Holley-Navarre Middle School
- Holley-Navarre Intermediate School
- Holley-Navarre Primary School
- Woodlawn Beach Middle School
- West Navarre Primary School
- West Navarre Intermediate School
- East Bay K-8 School

== Infrastructure ==
=== Highways ===
- U.S. Route 98 (Navarre Parkway)
- Florida State Road 87

=== Airports ===
Navarre doesn't have a dedicated commercially served airport. Instead, it is largely served by Pensacola International Airport (about 25 miles west in Pensacola) and Destin–Fort Walton Beach Airport (about 30 miles east in Valparaiso, Florida).

Fort Walton Beach Airport is a local general aviation airport.

Naval Outlying Landing Field Holley, previously a military airfield, has been converted to a solar field operated by Gulf Power and the United States Navy.

=== Public transportation ===
Navarre has limited public transportation, despite some public calls for it. Navarre does receive service from Santa Rosa Transportation, which provides some limited on-demand accessibility service from the town.

== Notable people ==
- Allison Black, U.S. Air Force officer
- Michael Carter, running back for the Arizona Cardinals
- Matt Cronin, relief pitcher for the Rochester Red Wings
- Jordan Leggett, former tight end for the New York Jets
- Michael "Crash" Lockwood, WWE wrestler
- Anne Rice, gothic fiction writer
- Joel Rudman, representative to the Florida House of Representatives for the 3rd district
- Akeem Spence, former defensive tackle for the San Francisco 49ers
- Jeff Van Camp, former quarterback for the Florida Atlantic Owls
- Guy Wyman, colonel during World War I, founder of modern-day Navarre
