= 1900 United States presidential election in Florida =

- November 6, 1900
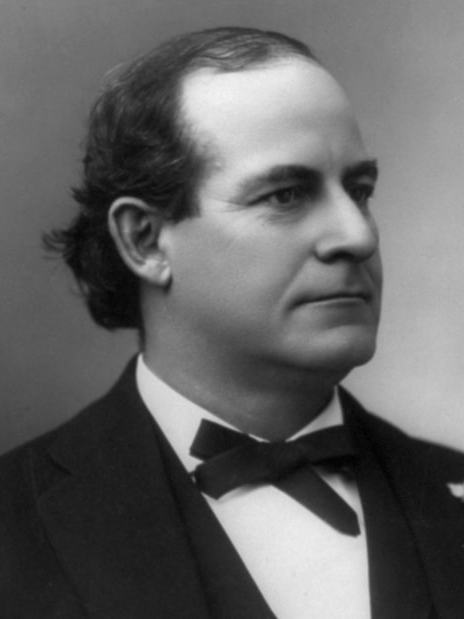

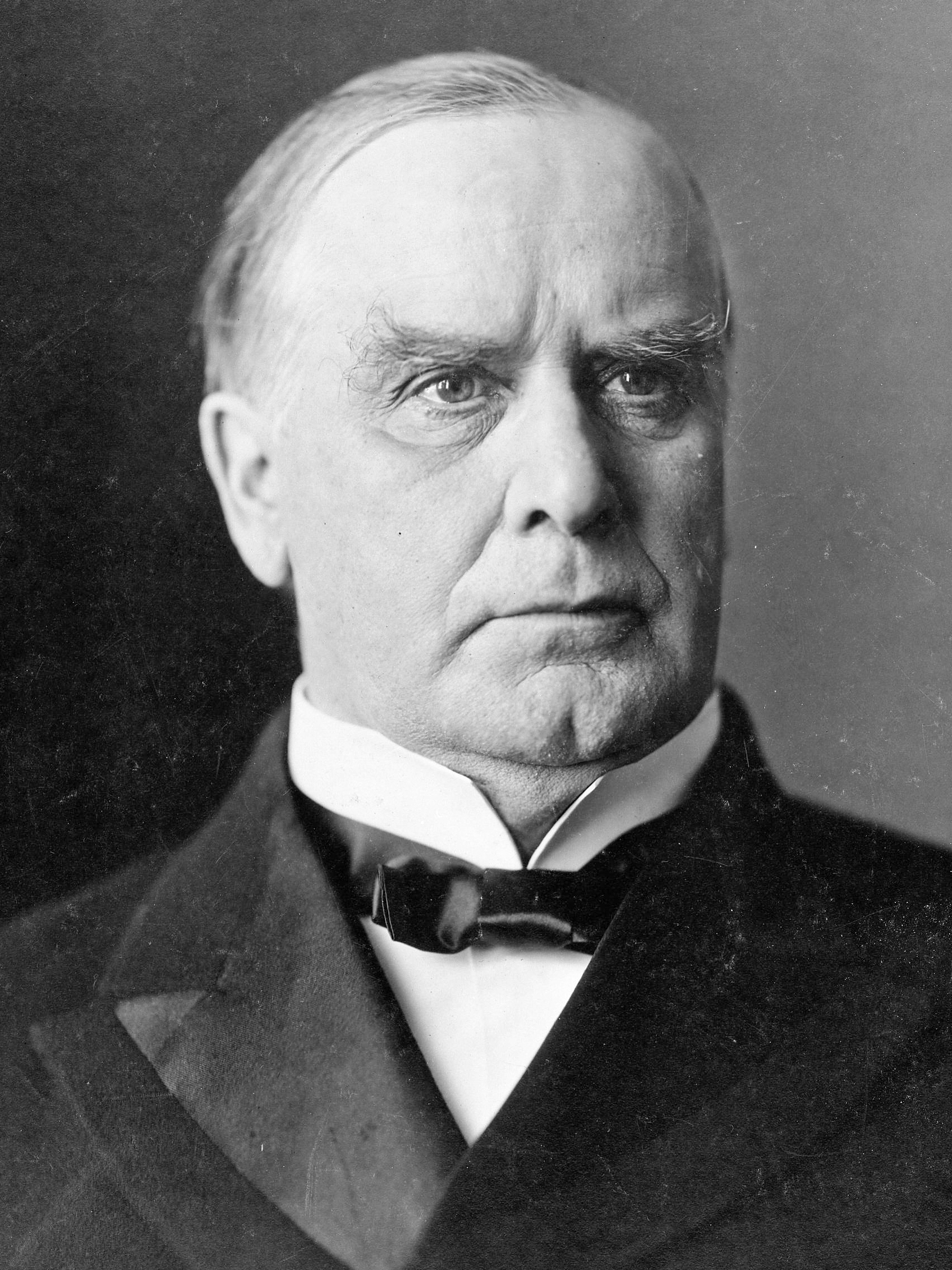

Nominee	William Jennings Bryan	William McKinley	John G. Woolley
Party	Democratic	Republican	Prohibition
Home state	Nebraska	Ohio	Illinois
Running mate	Adlai Stevenson I	Theodore Roosevelt	Henry B. Metcalf
Electoral vote	4	0	0
Popular vote	28,273	7,355	2,244
Percentage	71.31%	18.55%	5.66%
County results
Bryan
40–50%
50–60%
60–70%
70–80%
80–90%
90–100%
President before election
William McKinley
Republican
Elected President
William McKinley
Republican

The 1900 United States presidential election in Florida was held on November 6, 1900. Florida voters chose four representatives, or electors to the Electoral College, who voted for President and Vice-president.

The anti-Southern animus of the Harrison presidency meant Florida's large landowners felt the disfranchisement of blacks was urgent by 1889. A poll tax was introduced in 1889 as were the so-called “Myers” and “Dortch” laws which required voters in more populous settlements to register their voting precincts. This dramatically cut voter registration amongst blacks and poorer whites, and since Florida completely lacked upland or German refugee whites opposed to secession, its Republican Party between 1872 and 1888 was entirely dependent upon black votes. Thus this disfranchisement of blacks and poor whites by a poll tax introduced in 1889 left Florida as devoid of Republican adherents as Louisiana, Mississippi or South Carolina. The Republican Party did not offer presidential electors in 1892, and it did not carry a single county in 1896.

Florida was won by the Democratic nominees, former U.S. Representative and 1896 Democratic presidential nominee William Jennings Bryan and his running mate, former Vice President Adlai Stevenson I. They defeated the Republican nominees, incumbent President William McKinley of Ohio and his running mate Theodore Roosevelt of New York. Bryan won the state by a landslide margin of 52.76%.

With Bryan appealing to many pineywoods “crackers” who still paid the poll tax, he was able to improve upon his 1896 landslide. The power of Baptist preachers in the settled northern part of the state, however, did produce considerable support for the Prohibition Party’s John G. Woolley in the white counties. This stands as one of the ten occasions (Note: 1860, 1892, 1908, 1912, 1916, 1924, 1948, 1968 and 1992 are the others) when third or minor parties got over 5% of the vote in Florida. This also marks the only time since its statehood that any president has won two terms without ever carrying Florida.

With 71.31% of the popular vote, Florida would prove to be Bryan's fourth strongest state in the 1900 presidential election only after South Carolina, Mississippi and Louisiana.

Bryan had previously won Florida against McKinley four years earlier and would later win the state again in 1908 against William Howard Taft.

== Results ==
1900 United States presidential election in Florida
Party	Candidate	Votes	Percentage	Electoral votes
Democratic	William Jennings Bryan	28,273	71.31%	4
Republican	William McKinley (incumbent)	7,753	18.55%	0
Prohibition	John G. Woolley	2,244	5.66%	0
Populist	Wharton Barker	1,143	2.88%	0
Social Democratic	Eugene V. Debs	634	1.60%	0
Invalid or blank votes				—
Totals		39,649	100.00%	4
Voter turnout				—

=== Results by county ===
County	William Jennings Bryan Democratic		William McKinley Republican		John Granville Woolley Prohibition		Wharton Barker Populist		Eugene Victor Debs Socialist		Margin		Total votes cast
County	#	%	#	%	#	%	#	%	#	%	#	%	Total votes cast
Alachua	1,346	76.83%	334	19.06%	17	0.97%	50	2.85%	9	0.51%	1,012	57.76%	1,752
Baker	198	58.41%	112	33.04%	16	4.75%	8	2.37%	3	0.89%	86	25.37%	339
Bradford	734	63.39%	276	23.83%	101	8.82%	21	1.83%	13	1.14%	458	39.55%	1,158
Brevard	513	73.60%	121	17.36%	44	6.30%	18	2.58%	2	0.29%	392	56.24%	697
Calhoun	196	67.12%	35	11.99%	30	10.27%	28	9.59%	3	1.03%	161	55.14%	292
Citrus	413	92.19%	16	3.57%	18	4.02%	1	0.22%	0	0.00%	395 (Note: In this county where Woolley ran second ahead of McKinley, margin given is Bryan vote minus Woolley vote and percentage margin Bryan percentage minus Woolley percentage.)	88.17%	448
Clay	308	71.13%	91	21.02%	8	1.85%	19	4.39%	7	1.62%	217	50.12%	433
Columbia	663	66.70%	252	25.35%	15	1.53%	44	4.49%	6	0.61%	411	41.35%	994
Dade	806	58.62%	389	28.29%	100	7.33%	54	3.96%	16	1.17%	417	30.33%	1,375
De Soto	526	63.99%	134	16.30%	27	3.28%	32	3.89%	103	12.53%	392	47.69%	822
Duval	1,857	66.49%	773	27.68%	24	0.86%	103	3.69%	31	1.11%	1,084	38.81%	2,793
Escambia	1,435	63.47%	432	19.11%	346	15.30%	30	1.33%	18	0.80%	1,003	44.36%	2,261
Franklin	239	56.10%	146	34.27%	25	5.87%	13	3.05%	3	0.70%	93	21.83%	426
Gadsden	684	91.32%	61	8.14%	0	0.00%	4	0.53%	0	0.00%	623	83.18%	749
Hamilton	322	68.08%	96	20.30%	38	7.87%	13	2.69%	14	2.90%	226	47.78%	473
Hernando	252	88.11%	18	6.29%	10	3.50%	5	1.75%	1	0.35%	234	81.82%	286
Hillsborough	2,257	69.55%	349	10.76%	514	15.84%	36	1.11%	89	2.74%	1,743	53.71%	3,245
Holmes	339	72.75%	69	14.81%	46	9.87%	8	1.72%	4	0.86%	270	57.94%	466
Jackson	978	78.43%	178	14.27%	14	1.12%	53	4.25%	24	1.92%	800	64.15%	1,247
Jefferson	711	82.29%	143	16.55%	4	0.46%	6	0.69%	0	0.00%	568	65.74%	864
Lafayette	326	89.07%	21	5.74%	13	3.55%	6	1.64%	0	0.00%	305	83.33%	366
Lake	492	70.49%	143	20.49%	41	5.90%	17	2.45%	2	0.29%	349	50.00%	698
Lee	278	81.29%	39	11.40%	20	5.85%	2	0.58%	3	0.88%	239	69.88%	342
Leon	932	80.28%	162	13.95%	43	3.70%	21	1.81%	3	0.26%	770	66.32%	1,161
Levy	383	67.31%	157	27.59%	4	0.70%	23	4.04%	2	0.35%	226	39.72%	569
Liberty	127	88.19%	10	6.94%	6	4.17%	1	0.69%	0	0.00%	117	81.25%	144
Madison	510	76.92%	44	6.64%	83	12.65%	7	1.07%	12	1.83%	427	64.27%	663
Manatee	535	81.68%	60	9.16%	42	6.10%	9	1.31%	42	6.10%	475	72.52%	655
Marion	1,132	75.02%	264	17.50%	32	2.13%	52	3.47%	19	1.27%	868	57.52%	1,509
Monroe	747	66.28%	252	22.36%	56	4.97%	50	4.44%	22	1.95%	495	43.92%	1,127
Nassau	441	70.56%	149	23.84%	11	1.77%	17	2.73%	5	0.80%	292	46.72%	625
Orange	857	61.65%	402	28.92%	52	3.75%	56	4.04%	18	1.30%	455	32.73%	1,390
Osceola	266	71.89%	42	11.35%	47	12.63%	11	2.96%	6	1.61%	219	59.26%	370
Pasco	492	84.68%	32	5.51%	43	7.40%	14	2.41%	0	0.00%	449	77.28%	581
Polk	983	79.60%	133	10.77%	9	0.73%	24	1.94%	86	6.96%	850	68.83%	1,235
Putnam	648	65.32%	250	25.20%	56	5.63%	24	2.41%	17	1.71%	398	40.12%	992
St. John's	764	70.35%	234	21.55%	15	1.39%	53	4.92%	11	1.02%	530	48.80%	1,086
Santa Rosa	519	88.42%	38	6.47%	8	1.36%	14	2.39%	8	1.36%	481	81.95%	587
Sumter	343	81.28%	53	12.56%	8	1.90%	14	3.33%	2	0.48%	290	68.72%	422
Suwannee	677	71.41%	153	16.14%	76	8.04%	34	3.60%	5	0.53%	524	55.27%	948
Taylor	253	60.38%	105	25.06%	5	1.20%	53	12.74%	0	0.00%	148	35.32%	419
Volusia	755	67.47%	255	22.79%	60	5.34%	40	3.56%	13	1.16%	500	44.68%	1,119
Wakulla	254	85.81%	10	3.38%	32	10.81%	0	0.00%	0	0.00%	222	75.00%	296
Walton	382	67.97%	139	24.73%	30	5.34%	11	1.96%	0	0.00%	243	43.24%	562
Washington	387	49.05%	291	36.88%	55	6.97%	44	5.58%	12	1.52%	96	12.17%	789
Totals	28,260	71.05%	7,463	18.76%	2,244	5.64%	1,143	2.87%	634	0.51%	20,797	52.29%	39,775

== See also ==
- United States presidential elections in Florida
