= 1860 United States presidential election in South Carolina =

- November 6, 1860
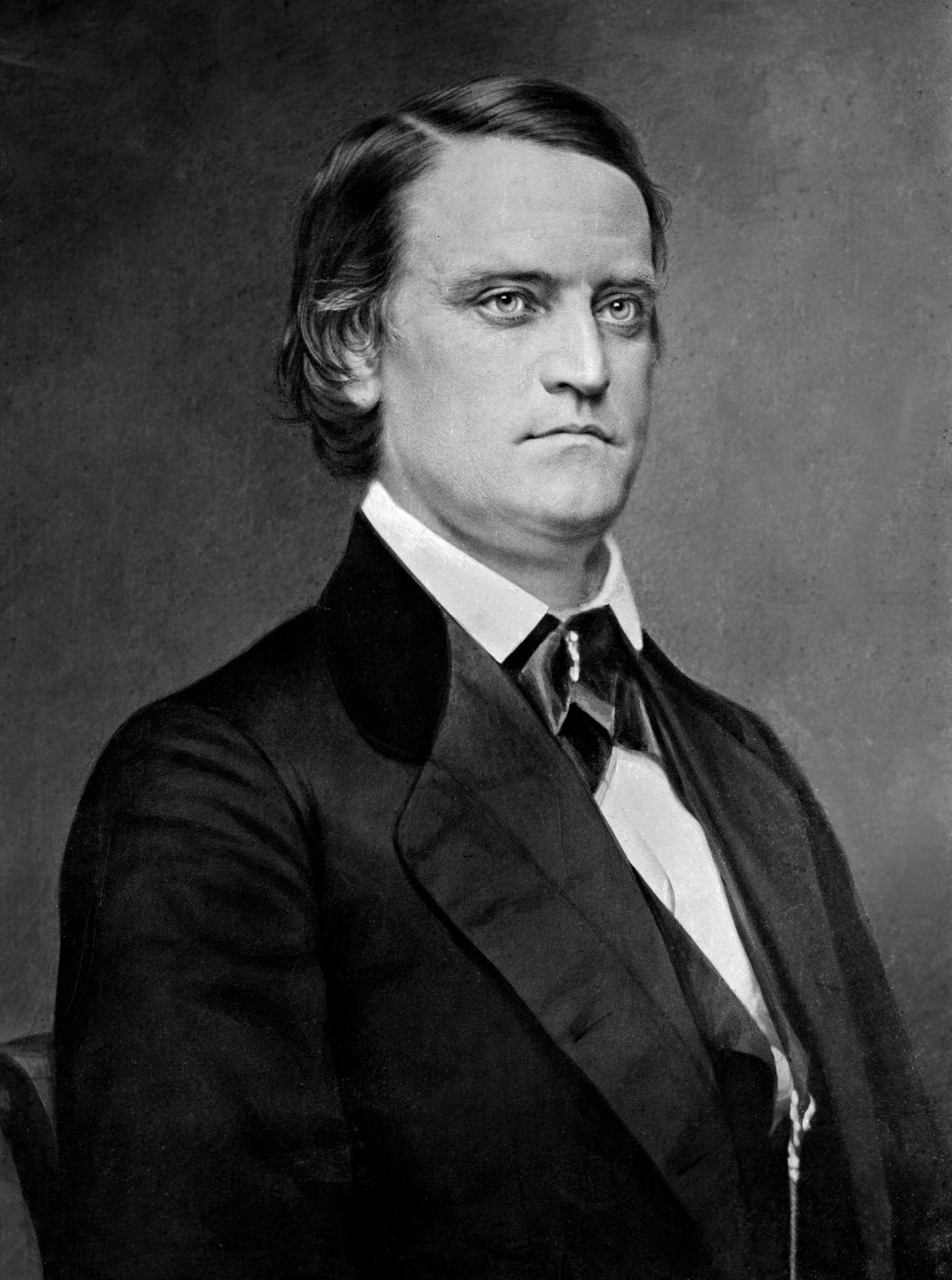
Nominee	John C. Breckinridge
Party	Southern Democratic
Home state	Kentucky
Running mate	Joseph Lane
Electoral vote	8
President before election
James Buchanan
Democratic
Elected President
Abraham Lincoln
Republican

The 1860 United States presidential election in South Carolina took place on November 6, 1860, as part of this 1860 United States presidential election. The state legislature chose eight representatives, or electors to the Electoral College, who voted for president and vice president. By 1860, South Carolina was the only state using this procedure in a presidential election and had been since Delaware switched to popular vote for the 1832 election. This would also be the last time South Carolina would do so. After this election, Colorado in 1876 (when the state was too newly formed to organize an election) and Florida in 1868 (when reconstruction concerns led to the state legislature being used) were the only times a state selected electors by the state legislature.

== Background ==
Secessionists under the leadership of Robert Barnwell Rhett and unionists under the leadership of James Lawrence Orr fought for control over the South Carolina Democratic Party during the 1850s. James H. Hammond, who was more aligned with Orr, defeated Rhett in the 1857 U.S. Senate election.

== Nomination ==
The Democratic Party's state convention was held on April 16, and was controlled by Orr's faction. The convention advocated for party unity, maintaining the union, and rejected the Alabama platform's plan to have the southern delegations walk out of the national convention. Orr served as president of the convention, which endorsed him for the presidential nomination. Muscoe R. H. Garnett communicated with South Carolinian leaders, such as William Porcher Miles, and advocated supporting Robert M. T. Hunter, Benjamin Fitzpatrick, James Guthrie, John C. Breckinridge, or Orr for the presidential nomination. An uninstructed sixteen member delegation was sent to the national convention.

South Carolina's delegation to the Democratic National Convention in Charleston included Arthur Simkins, James Simons, Thomas Young Simons, Samuel McGowan, Benjamin H. Wilson, Franklin Gaillard, and Benjamin Franklin Perry. The delegation supported Hunter during the presidential balloting. On April 30, 1860, all except for three members of the delegation (Simkins, Perry, and Lemuel Boozer) joined other southern states in bolting the convention.

A new state convention, pushed by Rhett and his supporters against the opposition of Perry and Orr, was held on May 30. Only 52 of the 161 delegates to the first convention were reelected to attend this one. Rhett, his brother Edmund Rhett, and his son R. Barnwell Rhett Jr. were among the delegates elected. John Hugh Means, who previously supported secession in 1851, was selected as permanent chairman of the convention.

The state's four at-large delegates were selected by a vote of the whole convention rather than by a committee based on the congressional districts. This system benefited the more radical and pro-secessionist delegates. Rhett was elected as a delegate to the national convention in Baltimore and was the leader of the delegation. This delegation supported the presidential ticket of Breckinridge and Joseph Lane.

== Campaign ==
The elections held for the state legislature on October 8 resulted in a pro-secessionist legislature. Governor William Henry Gist convened the legislature on October 12, and South Carolina cast eight electoral votes for Breckinridge. These electors were chosen by the state legislature rather than by popular vote.

== Results ==
1860 United States presidential election in South Carolina
Party	Candidate	Running mate	Popular vote		Electoral vote	
Party	Candidate	Running mate	Count	%	Count	%
Southern Democratic	John Cabell Breckinridge of Kentucky	Joseph Lane of Oregon	–	–	8	100.00%

== See also ==
- United States presidential elections in South Carolina

== Works cited ==
- Channing, Steven (1974). Crisis of Fear: Secession in South Carolina. W. W. Norton & Company. ISBN 0-393-00730-8.
- Kibler, Lilian (1938). "Unionist Sentiment in South Carolina in 1860". The Journal of Southern History. 4 (3). Southern Historical Association: 27–48. doi:10.2307/2191294. JSTOR 2191294.
