= 1912 United States presidential election in Florida =

- November 5, 1912

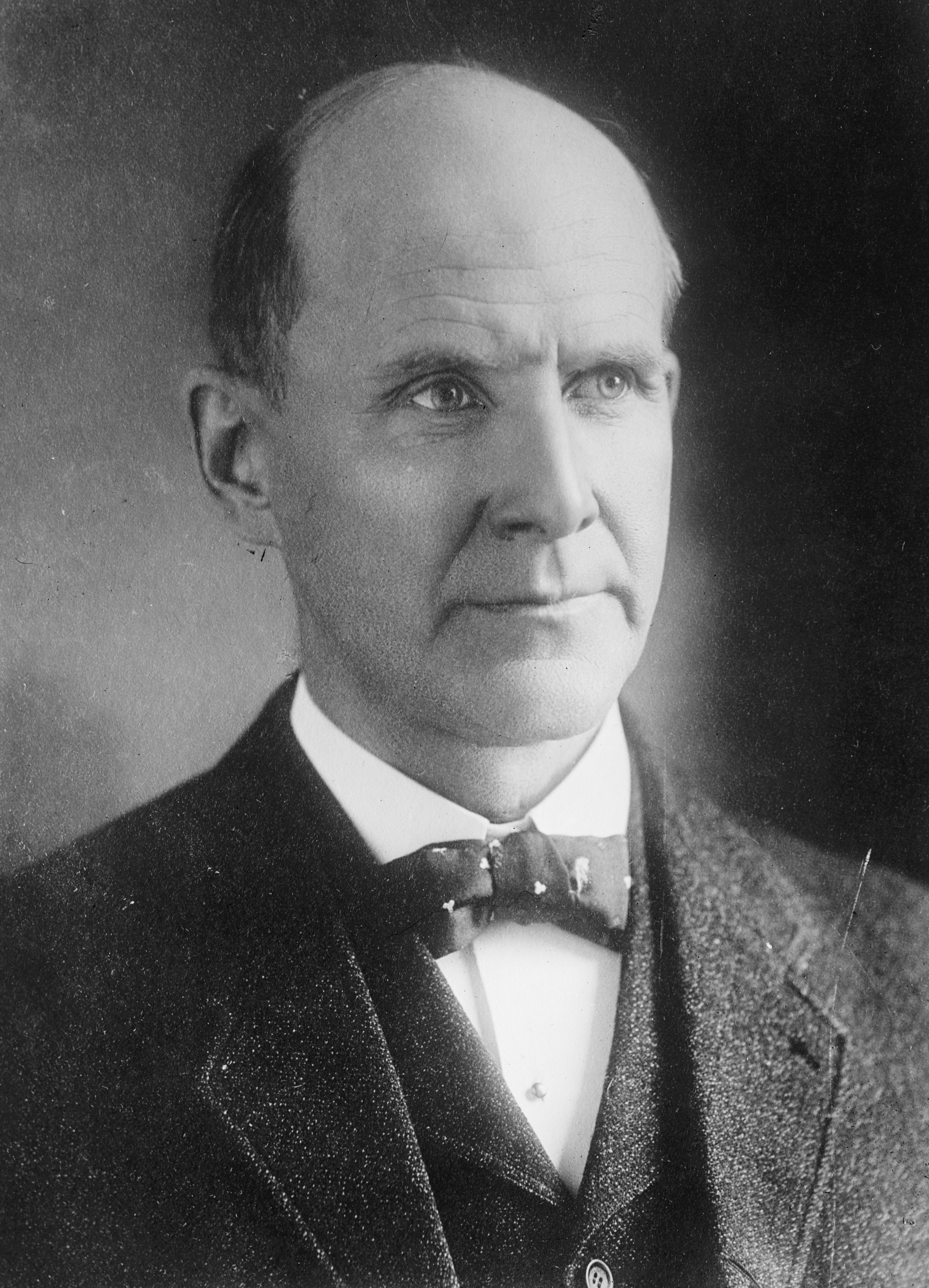

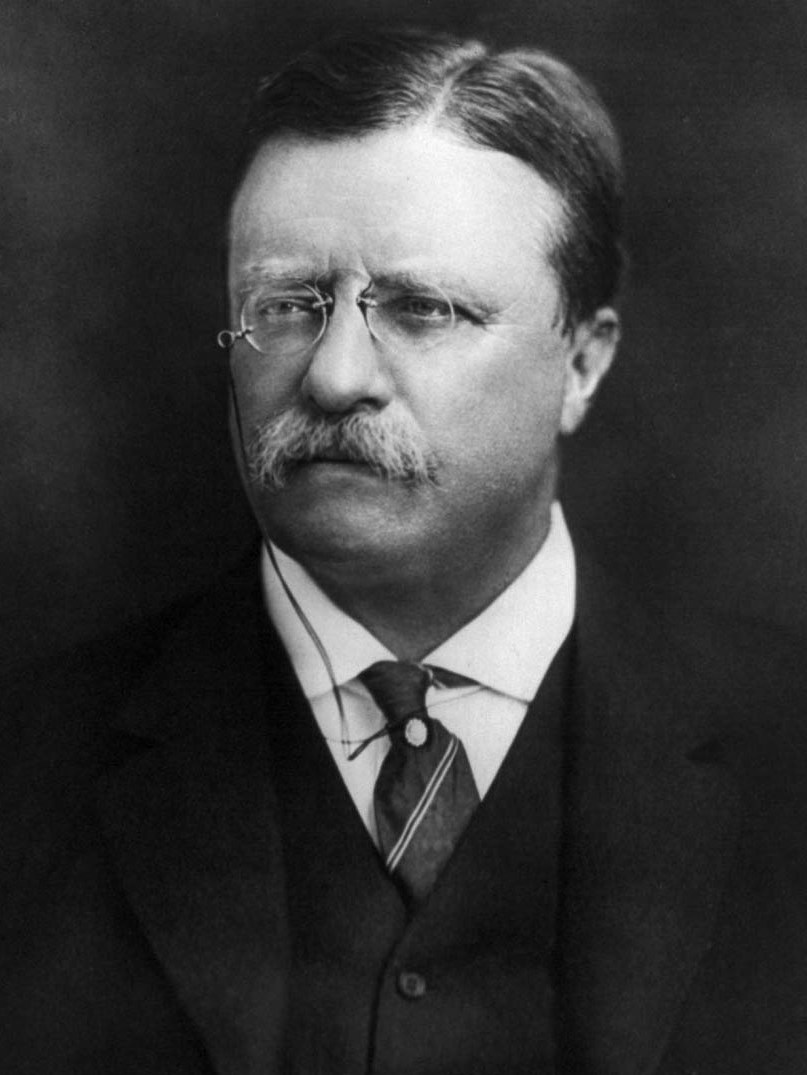

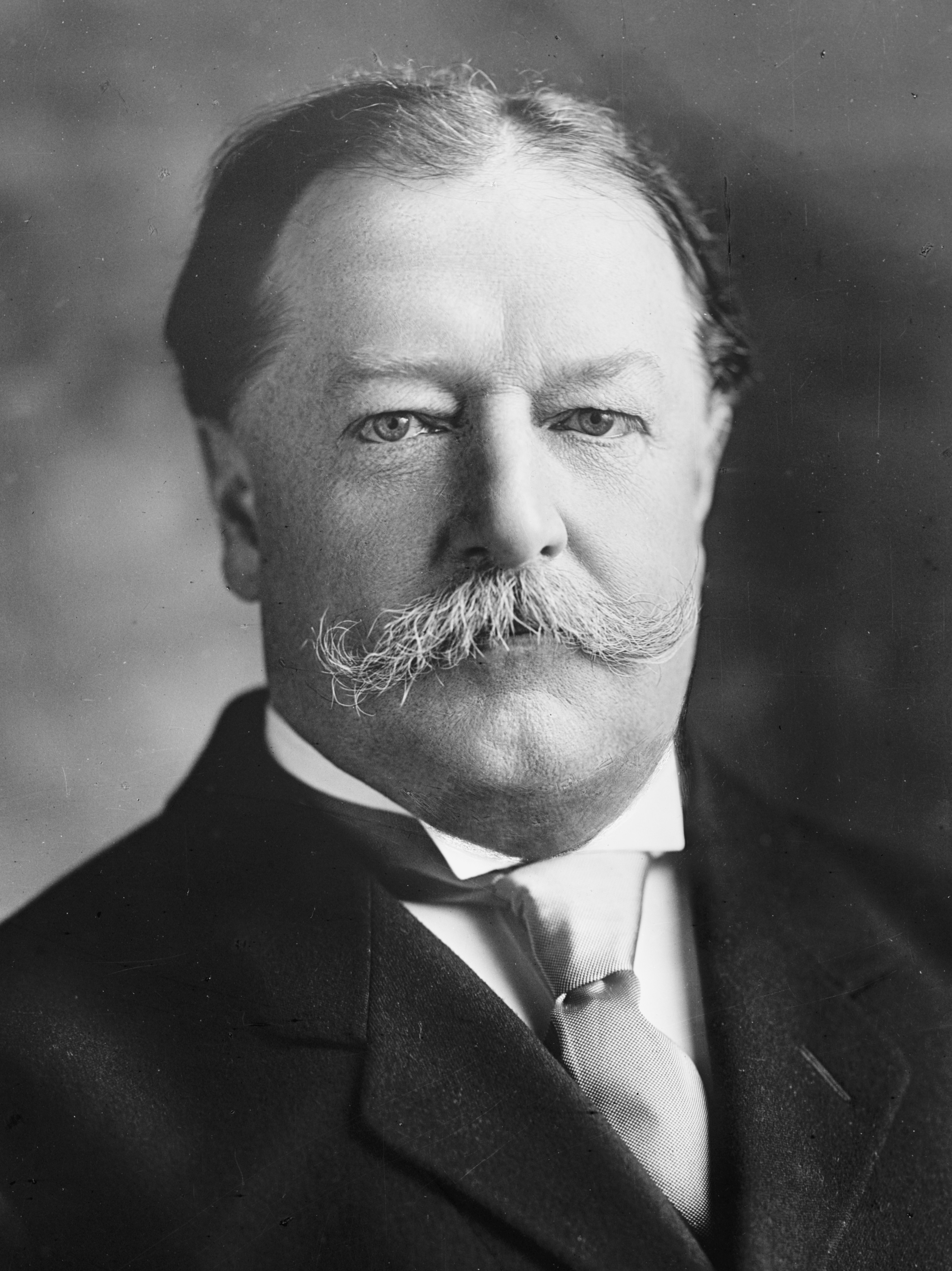
Nominee	Woodrow Wilson	Eugene V. Debs
Party	Democratic	Socialist
Home state	New Jersey	Indiana
Running mate	Thomas R. Marshall	Emil Seidel
Electoral vote	6	0
Popular vote	35,343	4,806
Percentage	69.52%	9.45%
Nominee	Theodore Roosevelt	William Howard Taft
Party	Progressive	Republican
Home state	New York	Ohio
Running mate	Hiram Johnson	Nicholas Murray Butler
Electoral vote	0	0
Popular vote	4,555	4,279
Percentage	8.96%	8.42%
County results
Wilson
50–60%
60–70%
70–80%
80–90%
President before election
William Howard Taft
Republican
Elected President
Woodrow Wilson
Democratic

The 1912 United States presidential election in Florida was held on November 5, 1912. Voters chose six representatives, or electors to the Electoral College, who voted for president and vice president.

Ever since the disfranchisement of black Americans at the beginning of the 1890s, Florida had been a one-party state ruled by the Democratic Party. Because, unlike southern states extending into the Appalachian Mountains or Ozarks, or Texas with its German settlements in the Edwards Plateau, Florida completely lacked upland or German refugee whites opposed to secession, its Republican Party between 1872 and 1888 was entirely dependent upon black votes. An illustration of the original Florida GOP's dependence upon black votes can be seen in that, as late as the landmark court case of Smith v. Allwright, half of Florida's registered Republicans were still black – although very few blacks in Florida had ever voted within the previous fifty-five years. Thus this disfranchisement of blacks and poor whites by a poll tax introduced in 1889 left Florida nearly as devoid of Republican adherents as Louisiana, Mississippi or South Carolina.

The Democratic Party won every county in Florida in each election from 1892 (Note: In the 1892 presidential election, Republican Benjamin Harrison was not on the ballot and the party backed Populist James B. Weaver.) until 1904, and all bar Calhoun County in 1908. Only once since 1897 – and then only for a single term – had a Republican served in either house of the state legislature.

Despite this disfranchisement of most of the state's lower classes, by the 1912 election, southern Florida – settled after the Civil War – was to develop a considerable socialist movement at the beginning of the 1910s – most strongly in Tampa. Although this movement had no effect on the overall presidential result – Democrat Woodrow Wilson was to win every county with an absolute majority of votes – it did allow Socialist Eugene Debs to achieve the unique feat for an American socialist of finishing second, ahead of both factions of the splintered national Republican Party.

== Results ==
1912 United States presidential election in Florida
Party	Candidate	Running mate	Popular vote		Electoral vote	
Party	Candidate	Running mate	Count	%	Count	%
Democratic	Woodrow Wilson of New Jersey	Thomas R. Marshall of Indiana	35,343	69.52%	6	100.00%
Socialist	Eugene V. Debs of Indiana	Emil Seidel of Wisconsin	4,806	9.45%	0	0.00%
Progressive	Theodore Roosevelt of New York	Hiram W. Johnson of California	4,555	8.96%	0	0.00%
Republican	William Howard Taft of Ohio (incumbent)	Nicholas Murray Butler of New York	4,279	8.42%	0	0.00%
Prohibition	Eugene Chafin of Illinois	Aaron Watkins of Ohio	1,854	3.65%	0	0.00%
Total			50,837	100.00%	6	100.00%

=== Results by county ===
	Thomas Woodrow Wilson Democratic		William Howard Taft Republican		Eugene Victor Debs Socialist		Theodore Roosevelt Jr. Progressive "Bull Moose"		Eugene Wilder Chafin Prohibition		Margin		Total votes cast
County	#	%	#	%	#	%	#	%	#	%	#	%	Total votes cast
Alachua	1,304	75.33%	221	12.77%	56	3.24%	75	4.33%	75	4.33%	1,083	62.56%	1,731
Baker	168	50.76%	37	11.18%	31	9.37%	93	28.10%	2	0.60%	75	22.66%	331
Bradford	656	76.55%	95	11.09%	10	1.17%	40	4.67%	56	6.53%	561	65.46%	857
Brevard	357	60.51%	61	10.34%	82	13.90%	82	13.90%	8	1.36%	275	46.61%	590
Calhoun	332	50.30%	67	10.15%	152	23.03%	59	8.94%	50	7.58%	180	27.27%	660
Citrus	417	82.90%	11	2.19%	21	4.17%	44	8.75%	10	1.99%	373	74.15%	503
Clay	279	71.54%	26	6.67%	54	13.85%	21	5.38%	10	2.56%	225	57.69%	390
Columbia	520	77.61%	66	9.85%	23	3.43%	50	7.46%	11	1.64%	470	70.15%	670
Dade	1,171	65.71%	99	5.56%	188	10.55%	291	16.33%	33	1.85%	880	49.38%	1,782
DeSoto	847	67.28%	110	8.74%	135	10.72%	78	6.20%	89	7.07%	712	56.56%	1,259
Duval	3,514	75.26%	243	5.20%	350	7.50%	485	10.39%	77	1.65%	3,029	64.87%	4,669
Escambia	1,593	77.11%	72	3.48%	158	7.65%	202	9.78%	41	1.98%	1,391	67.33%	2,066
Franklin	266	68.21%	58	14.87%	38	9.74%	23	5.90%	5	1.28%	208	53.34%	390
Gadsden	609	78.99%	75	9.73%	31	4.02%	54	7.00%	2	0.26%	534	69.26%	771
Hamilton	405	72.71%	46	8.26%	60	10.77%	24	4.31%	22	3.95%	345	61.94%	557
Hernando	272	71.02%	18	4.70%	42	10.97%	22	5.74%	29	7.57%	230	60.05%	383
Hillsborough	2,641	67.63%	159	4.07%	672	17.21%	269	6.89%	164	4.20%	1,969	50.42%	3,905
Holmes	411	61.16%	52	7.74%	79	11.76%	110	16.37%	20	2.98%	301	44.79%	672
Jackson	1,205	71.01%	163	9.61%	146	8.60%	68	4.01%	115	6.78%	1,042	61.40%	1,697
Jefferson	459	82.55%	47	8.45%	9	1.62%	39	7.01%	2	0.36%	412	74.10%	556
Lafayette	473	76.79%	73	11.85%	8	1.30%	11	1.79%	51	8.28%	400	64.94%	616
Lake	596	73.49%	92	11.34%	39	4.81%	63	7.77%	21	2.59%	504	62.15%	811
Lee	432	60.50%	38	5.32%	116	16.25%	97	13.59%	31	4.34%	316	44.25%	714
Leon	546	81.98%	56	8.41%	15	2.25%	46	6.91%	3	0.45%	490	73.57%	666
Levy	375	70.49%	74	13.91%	30	5.64%	24	4.51%	29	5.45%	301	56.58%	532
Liberty	206	77.74%	32	12.08%	7	2.64%	18	6.79%	2	0.75%	174	65.66%	265
Madison	480	87.59%	16	2.92%	19	3.47%	30	5.47%	3	0.55%	450	82.12%	548
Manatee	712	68.73%	55	5.31%	98	9.46%	108	10.42%	63	6.08%	604	58.31%	1,036
Marion	1,165	70.73%	179	10.87%	124	7.53%	117	7.10%	62	3.76%	986	59.86%	1,647
Monroe	1,023	55.72%	414	22.55%	221	12.04%	152	8.28%	26	1.42%	609	33.17%	1,836
Nassau	441	82.89%	38	7.14%	31	5.83%	17	3.20%	5	0.94%	403	75.75%	532
Orange	1,256	68.15%	228	12.37%	124	6.73%	134	7.27%	101	5.48%	1,028	55.78%	1,843
Osceola	512	57.59%	110	12.37%	64	7.20%	159	17.89%	44	4.95%	353	39.70%	889
Palm Beach	458	63.17%	31	4.28%	77	10.62%	146	20.14%	13	1.79%	312	43.03%	725
Pasco	485	67.45%	60	8.34%	64	8.90%	74	10.29%	36	5.01%	411	57.16%	719
Pinellas	853	60.16%	87	6.14%	189	13.33%	250	17.63%	39	2.75%	603	42.53%	1,418
Polk	1,520	71.43%	106	4.98%	291	13.67%	141	6.63%	70	3.29%	1,229	57.76%	2,128
Putnam	774	65.93%	229	19.51%	67	5.71%	53	4.51%	51	4.34%	545	46.42%	1,174
St. Johns	836	73.08%	45	3.93%	116	10.14%	132	11.54%	15	1.31%	704	61.54%	1,144
St. Lucie	352	69.57%	45	8.89%	64	12.65%	36	7.11%	9	1.78%	288	56.92%	506
Santa Rosa	592	66.29%	70	7.84%	88	9.85%	48	5.38%	95	10.64%	497	55.65%	893
Sumter	417	74.73%	22	3.94%	19	3.41%	71	12.72%	29	5.20%	346	62.01%	558
Suwannee	714	69.59%	54	5.26%	214	20.86%	29	2.83%	15	1.46%	500	48.73%	1,026
Taylor	236	65.01%	56	15.43%	9	2.48%	19	5.23%	43	11.85%	180	49.58%	363
Volusia	942	67.48%	162	11.60%	98	7.02%	72	5.16%	122	8.74%	780	55.88%	1,396
Wakulla	215	77.06%	25	8.96%	22	7.89%	15	5.38%	2	0.72%	190	68.10%	279
Walton	612	57.95%	74	7.01%	69	6.53%	296	28.03%	5	0.47%	316	29.92%	1,056
Washington	694	64.38%	82	7.61%	186	17.25%	68	6.31%	48	4.45%	508	47.13%	1,078
Totals	35,343	69.52%	4,279	8.42%	4,806	9.45%	4,555	8.96%	1,854	3.65%	30,537	60.07%	50,837

== See also ==
- United States presidential elections in Florida
