= 1948 United States presidential election in Florida =

- November 2, 1948

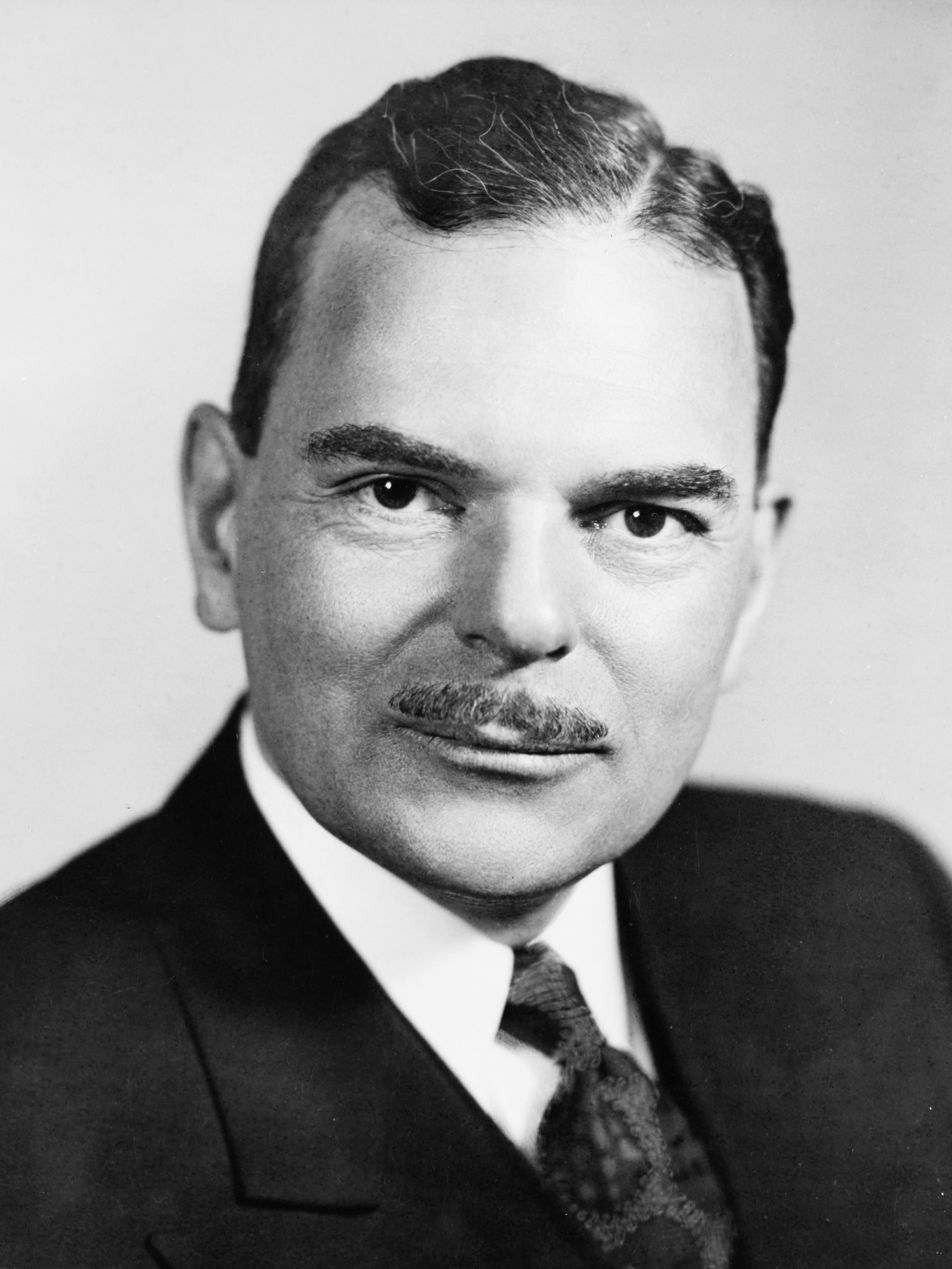

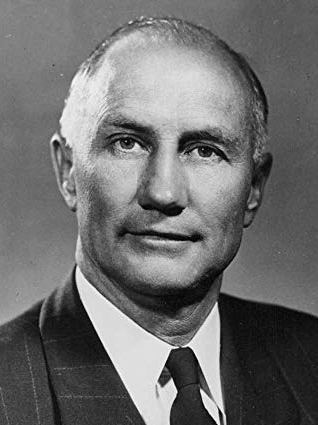
Nominee	Harry Truman	Thomas E. Dewey	Strom Thurmond
Party	Democratic	Republican	States' Rights Democratic
Home state	Missouri	New York	South Carolina
Running mate	Alben Barkley	Earl Warren	Fielding Wright
Electoral vote	8	0	0
Popular vote	281,988	194,280	89,755
Percentage	48.82%	33.63%	15.54%
County results
Truman
30–40%
40–50%
50–60%
60–70%
70–80%
80–90%
Dewey
30–40%
40–50%
50–60%
Thurmond
30–40%
50–60%
President before election
Harry Truman
Democratic
Elected President
Harry Truman
Democratic

The 1948 United States presidential election in Florida was held on November 2, 1948. Voters chose eight electors, or representatives to the Electoral College, who voted for president and vice president.

Harry S. Truman won by 87,708 votes or 15.19 percentage points over his Republican opponent Thomas E. Dewey. In culturally Deep Southern North Florida, including the rural and socially conservative Panhandle, Truman was able to rely on having a strong economic program – which Strom Thurmond entirely lacked – to hold off Thurmond's racial appeal. In more cosmopolitan and liberal Central and South Florida – which had seen extensive settlement by Northerners since the war – his economic policies were a winner against Henry A. Wallace, who received only two percent of the state's vote but did an order of magnitude better in some Tampa precincts.

Dewey nonetheless made dramatic gains upon previous Republican efforts in Florida. By carrying eleven counties, all of which were located in Central and South Florida, mostly in the southwest and on the east coast, he was only the fifth Republican to carry any Florida county at the presidential level since the poll tax' original implementation following the 1888 election. (Note: William Howard Taft carried Calhoun County in 1908; Warren G. Harding in 1920 and Calvin Coolidge in 1924 each carried three counties in South Florida, and Herbert Hoover in 1928 carried the state and 41 of 67 counties.) The Dewey counties had in earlier Democratic primaries typically backed "conservative" candidates favoring limited or no economic regulation, due to their lack of dependence on the traditionally "Southern" crops of cotton and tobacco, and would become the most consistently conservative and Republican counties in future presidential elections. Strom Thurmond, who had had to run as a third-party candidate under the "States' Rights" banner, nonetheless won over fifteen percent of the vote. Thurmond carried three counties but ran second in thirty-one others.

As of the 2024 presidential election, this is the last time that Florida was won by a Democratic presidential candidate by double digits. Republicans have won Florida by double digits in six subsequent elections. This election is also the last time that Highlands County has ever voted for a Democratic presidential candidate. Osceola County, which Truman won by two votes, would not vote Democratic again until 1996. Seminole County would not vote Democratic again until 2020. Thurmond won 16% of white voters. Florida's ballot access laws required parties to have 5% of voters registered in them before the primary in May. The Progressives were unable to meet this requirement, but the Florida legislature changed the laws to allow the Dixiecrats to appear. This also allowed the Progressives to appear as well.

== Results ==
United States presidential election in Florida, 1948
Party	Candidate	Votes	Percentage	Electoral votes
Democratic	Harry S. Truman (incumbent)	281,988	48.82%	8
Republican	Thomas E. Dewey	194,280	33.63%	0
States' Rights	Strom Thurmond	89,755	15.54%	0
Progressive	Henry A. Wallace	11,620	2.01%	0
Total		577,643	100.00%	8
Voter turnout (Voting age)		33.5%		

=== Results by county ===
County	Harry S. Truman Democratic		Thomas E. Dewey Republican		Strom Thurmond Dixiecrat		Henry A. Wallace Progressive		Margin		Total votes cast
County	#	%	#	%	#	%	#	%	#	%	Total votes cast
Alachua	3,745	36.78%	2,403	23.60%	3,937	38.67%	97	0.95%	-192	-1.89%	10,182
Baker	849	72.19%	112	9.52%	213	18.11%	2	0.17%	636	54.08%	1,176
Bay	5,168	70.68%	928	12.69%	1,193	16.32%	23	0.31%	3,975	54.36%	7,312
Bradford	1,228	56.07%	357	16.30%	593	27.08%	12	0.55%	635	28.99%	2,190
Brevard	2,348	42.20%	2,315	41.61%	857	15.40%	44	0.79%	33	0.59%	5,564
Broward	7,096	36.35%	9,933	50.88%	2,300	11.78%	192	0.98%	-2,837	-14.53%	19,521
Calhoun	1,404	78.26%	128	7.13%	258	14.38%	4	0.22%	1,146	63.88%	1,794
Charlotte	520	41.01%	559	44.09%	172	13.56%	17	1.34%	-39	-3.08%	1,268
Citrus	940	56.90%	461	27.91%	244	14.77%	7	0.42%	479	28.99%	1,652
Clay	1,544	56.31%	722	26.33%	457	16.67%	19	0.69%	822	29.98%	2,742
Collier	362	41.14%	247	28.07%	251	28.52%	20	2.27%	111	12.62%	880
Columbia	1,797	53.93%	553	16.60%	978	29.35%	4	0.12%	819	24.58%	3,332
DeSoto	1,157	55.57%	569	27.33%	350	16.81%	6	0.29%	588	28.24%	2,082
Dixie	862	67.82%	111	8.73%	295	23.21%	3	0.24%	567	44.61%	1,271
Duval	28,567	47.85%	15,379	25.76%	14,428	24.17%	1,321	2.21%	13,188	22.09%	59,695
Escambia	13,982	63.11%	3,267	14.75%	4,790	21.62%	117	0.53%	9,192	41.49%	22,156
Flagler	153	23.61%	154	23.77%	330	50.93%	11	1.70%	-176	-27.16%	648
Franklin	635	59.79%	130	12.24%	294	27.68%	3	0.28%	341	32.11%	1,062
Gadsden	1,427	50.93%	376	13.42%	992	35.40%	7	0.25%	435	15.53%	2,802
Gilchrist	884	83.32%	46	4.34%	131	12.35%	0	0.00%	753	70.97%	1,061
Glades	274	49.37%	150	27.03%	127	22.88%	4	0.72%	124	22.34%	555
Gulf	1,219	77.20%	146	9.25%	209	13.24%	5	0.32%	1,010	63.96%	1,579
Hamilton	1,071	66.44%	202	12.53%	337	20.91%	2	0.12%	734	45.53%	1,612
Hardee	1,871	65.49%	689	24.12%	281	9.84%	16	0.56%	1,182	41.37%	2,857
Hendry	699	53.89%	340	26.21%	241	18.58%	17	1.31%	359	27.68%	1,297
Hernando	825	49.34%	441	26.38%	372	22.25%	34	2.03%	384	22.96%	1,672
Highlands	2,257	52.98%	1,471	34.53%	498	11.69%	34	0.80%	786	18.45%	4,260
Hillsborough	18,854	45.67%	13,529	32.77%	5,094	12.34%	3,809	9.23%	5,325	12.90%	41,286
Holmes	1,799	56.29%	492	15.39%	902	28.22%	3	0.09%	897	28.07%	3,196
Indian River	1,055	43.10%	1,134	46.32%	246	10.05%	13	0.53%	-79	-3.22%	2,448
Jackson	3,169	55.11%	648	11.27%	1,917	33.34%	16	0.28%	1,252	21.77%	5,750
Jefferson	700	52.91%	153	11.56%	467	35.30%	3	0.23%	233	17.61%	1,323
Lafayette	975	85.15%	52	4.54%	117	10.22%	1	0.09%	858	74.93%	1,145
Lake	3,474	41.96%	3,579	43.23%	1,180	14.25%	46	0.56%	-105	-1.27%	8,279
Lee	1,883	32.48%	2,276	39.26%	1,600	27.60%	38	0.66%	-393	-6.78%	5,797
Leon	3,607	58.55%	1,149	18.65%	1,350	21.91%	55	0.89%	2,257	36.64%	6,161
Levy	1,128	55.76%	225	11.12%	662	32.72%	8	0.40%	466	23.04%	2,023
Liberty	737	86.81%	30	3.53%	81	9.54%	1	0.12%	656	77.27%	849
Madison	1,189	51.70%	207	9.00%	898	39.04%	6	0.26%	291	12.66%	2,300
Manatee	2,766	36.35%	3,371	44.30%	1,431	18.80%	42	0.55%	-605	-7.95%	7,610
Marion	4,650	57.01%	1,829	22.43%	1,640	20.11%	37	0.45%	2,821	34.58%	8,156
Martin	815	38.55%	948	44.84%	323	15.28%	28	1.32%	-133	-6.29%	2,114
Miami-Dade	59,681	53.52%	41,301	37.04%	7,136	6.40%	3,394	3.04%	18,380	16.48%	111,512
Monroe	3,759	83.48%	548	12.17%	122	2.71%	74	1.64%	3,211	71.31%	4,503
Nassau	1,518	55.10%	540	19.60%	681	24.72%	16	0.58%	837	30.38%	2,755
Okaloosa	2,519	62.86%	486	12.13%	992	24.76%	10	0.25%	1,527	38.10%	4,007
Okeechobee	784	74.81%	179	17.08%	84	8.02%	1	0.10%	605	57.73%	1,048
Orange	10,063	39.23%	11,971	46.67%	3,374	13.15%	244	0.95%	-1,908	-7.44%	25,652
Osceola	1,577	44.65%	1,575	44.59%	357	10.11%	23	0.65%	2	0.06%	3,532
Palm Beach	9,408	39.01%	10,996	45.60%	3,226	13.38%	485	2.01%	-1,588	-6.59%	24,115
Pasco	2,375	48.66%	1,839	37.68%	628	12.87%	39	0.80%	536	10.98%	4,881
Pinellas	15,724	35.32%	24,900	55.92%	3,400	7.64%	500	1.12%	-9,176	-20.60%	44,524
Polk	12,034	52.57%	7,692	33.60%	2,992	13.07%	174	0.76%	4,342	18.97%	22,892
Putnam	1,947	40.27%	1,435	29.68%	1,431	29.60%	22	0.46%	512	10.59%	4,835
St. Johns	1,994	31.63%	1,840	29.18%	2,438	38.67%	33	0.52%	-444	-7.04%	6,305
St. Lucie	1,704	38.38%	1,689	38.04%	1,027	23.13%	20	0.45%	15	0.34%	4,440
Santa Rosa	2,316	65.72%	549	15.58%	639	18.13%	20	0.57%	1,677	47.59%	3,524
Sarasota	2,302	32.31%	3,559	49.95%	1,213	17.02%	51	0.72%	-1,257	-17.64%	7,125
Seminole	2,261	45.16%	1,665	33.25%	1,060	21.17%	21	0.42%	596	11.91%	5,007
Sumter	1,411	65.57%	251	11.66%	486	22.58%	4	0.19%	925	42.99%	2,152
Suwannee	3,033	71.62%	398	9.40%	786	18.56%	18	0.43%	2,247	53.06%	4,235
Taylor	1,354	67.73%	216	10.81%	422	21.11%	7	0.35%	932	46.62%	1,999
Union	594	67.96%	55	6.29%	225	25.74%	0	0.00%	369	42.22%	874
Volusia	9,202	46.76%	7,764	39.46%	2,411	12.25%	301	1.53%	1,438	7.30%	19,678
Wakulla	997	72.30%	72	5.22%	305	22.12%	5	0.36%	692	50.18%	1,379
Walton	2,366	62.28%	652	17.16%	761	20.03%	20	0.53%	1,605	42.25%	3,799
Washington	1,380	62.42%	297	13.43%	523	23.65%	11	0.50%	857	38.77%	2,211
Totals	281,988	48.82%	194,280	33.63%	89,755	15.54%	11,620	2.01%	87,708	15.19%	577,643

==== Counties that flipped from Democratic to Republican ====
- Broward
- Charlotte
- Indian River
- Lake
- Lee
- Manatee
- Martin
- Orange
- Palm Beach
- Pinellas
- Sarasota

==== Counties that flipped from Democratic to Dixiecrat ====
- Alachua
- Flagler
- St. Johns

== Analysis ==
With the exception of the 1928 election, when fierce anti-Catholicism and Prohibitionism caused Herbert Hoover to defeat the wet Catholic Al Smith, Florida since the end of the Reconstruction era had been a classic Southern one-party state dominated by the Democratic Party. Disfranchisement of African-Americans and many poor whites had virtually eliminated the Republican Party – only nine Republicans had ever been elected to the state legislature since 1890 – and Democratic primaries were the sole competitive elections.

Under the influence of Senator Claude Pepper, Florida had abolished the poll tax in 1937, leading to steady increases in voter turnout during the following several elections; however, there was no marked increase in African-American voting and Democratic hegemony remained unchallenged: FDR did not lose a single county in the state during his four elections.

However, on February 2, 1948, incumbent President Harry S. Truman, fearing that the anti-democratic practices and racial discrimination of the South would severely denigrate the United States' reputation in the Cold War, launched the first civil rights bill since the end of Reconstruction, along with Executive Order 9981 to desegregate the military. Mississippi governor Fielding Wright had already sounded a call for revolt, which he took to the Southern Governors Conference at Wakulla Springs to say that calls for civil rights legislation by national Democrats would not be tolerated in the South.

After Truman was renominated at the 1948 Democratic National Convention, Southern Democrats walked out and convened at Birmingham, Alabama on July 17, nominating South Carolina Governor James Strom Thurmond for president and Mississippi Governor Fielding L. Wright for vice president. Due to its smaller proportion of African Americans in its population than in other Southern states, Florida experienced less dissent from the national Democratic Party in response to these actions. Florida Senator Claude Pepper argued that, unless Dwight D. Eisenhower was nominated instead, Truman was the only viable nominee, while Frank Upchurch, a long-time adversary of Pepper, recommended that the renomination of Truman be fought. Eventually, those opposed to Truman won the primary fight, taking eleven and a half votes out of twenty and control of the state's delegation. When Florida's Democrats designated their presidential electors, four were pledged against Truman and four to vote for him, although only names of electors were listed. However, after the "States' Rights" convention in July, Miami Herald publisher Reuben Clein filed a civil suit to disqualify the four original electors who planned to vote for Thurmond. Pepper reversed his earlier pledge not to support Truman, and a special session of the state legislature provided separate lists for all candidates, including the progressive former Vice President Henry A. Wallace. Pepper campaigned on Dewey's alleged support of big business over the "little man", and Truman made a whistle-stop tour of the state in mid-October.

== See also ==
- United States presidential elections in Florida

== Works cited ==
- Black, Earl; Black, Merle (1992). The Vital South: How Presidents Are Elected. Harvard University Press. ISBN 0674941306.
- Schmidt, Karl (1960). Henry A. Wallace: Quixotic Crusade 1948. Syracuse University Press. ISBN 978-0-8156-0020-6.
