= 1924 United States presidential election in Florida =

- November 4, 1924

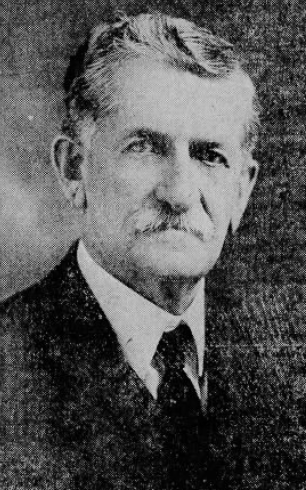
Nominee	John W. Davis	Calvin Coolidge
Party	Democratic	Republican
Home state	West Virginia	Massachusetts
Running mate	Charles W. Bryan	Charles G. Dawes
Electoral vote	6	0
Popular vote	62,083	30,633
Percentage	56.88%	28.06%
Nominee	Robert M. La Follette	Herman Faris
Party	Progressive	Prohibition
Home state	Wisconsin	Missouri
Running mate	Burton K. Wheeler	Marie C. Brehm
Electoral vote	0	0
Popular vote	8,625	5,498
Percentage	7.90%	5.04%
County results
Davis
30–40%
40–50%
50–60%
60–70%
70–80%
80–90%
90–100%
Coolidge
40–50%
President before election
Calvin Coolidge
Republican
Elected President
Calvin Coolidge
Republican

The 1924 United States presidential election in Florida was held on November 4, 1924. Voters chose six representatives, or electors to the Electoral College, who voted for president and vice president.

Ever since the disfranchisement of blacks at the beginning of the 1890s, Florida had effectively been a one-party state ruled by the Democratic Party. The disfranchisement of blacks and poor whites by poll taxes in 1889 had left the Republican Party – between 1872 and 1888 dependent upon black votes – virtually extinct.

With the single exception of William Howard Taft’s win in Calhoun County in 1908 the Democratic Party won every county in Florida in every presidential election from 1892 (Note: In the 1892 presidential election, Republican Benjamin Harrison was not on the ballot and the party backed Populist James B. Weaver.) until 1916. Only twice – and never for more than one term – did any Republican serve in either house of the state legislature between 1896 and 1928. Despite this Democratic dominance and the restrictions on the franchise of the poorer classes due to the poll tax, significant socialist movements developed and persisted in Tampa and to a lesser extent over other parts of the state, especially against the powerful Ku Klux Klan. There was also a powerful Prohibitionist movement in older North Florida, which saw the Prohibition Party even win the governorship for one term under the notorious anti-Catholic minister Sidney J. Catts.

The 1920 presidential election saw Warren G. Harding, aided substantially by isolationist sentiment in the region, gain more support in the former Confederacy than any Republican since black disfranchisement, in the process winning three Florida counties. Owing to a decline in voter turnout, and an easing of isolationist feelings, Coolidge was unable to match Harding's percentage of the vote. However, vis-à-vis Harding's performance in this one-party southern state, Coolidge's losing margin was 2.53 percentage points smaller, and he did make small gains amongst the small but increasing flow of Northeastern migrants moving to Florida's hot climate. Although he did not manage to hold Broward County or Osceola County, where Harding gained pluralities in 1920, Coolidge did become the first Republican to ever carry Pinellas County.

Despite the fact that the Republican Party had never gained 31 percent of Florida's vote in a presidential election since the poll tax was introduced, 1924 remains, as of the 2024 presidential election, the last time a Republican presidential candidate has won an election without carrying Florida. Passionate anti-Catholic feelings in the Piney Woods region would turn the presidential electoral votes of this one-party state against urban Catholic Al Smith in 1928, and the state went on to become largely a bellwether in presidential elections. Since 1928 it has only backed a losing presidential candidate three times, each time a Republican: Richard Nixon in 1960, George H. W. Bush in 1992, and Donald Trump in 2020. Given that Nixon would be elected president eight years later, Bush was the incumbent president, and Trump was both the incumbent president and then would be re-elected president to a second non-consecutive term four years later, 1924 also marks the last time that Florida voted for a candidate who never won the presidency. It also marks the last time that Florida voted against an incumbent president who won another term.

Florida proved to be the strongest state for Prohibition Party candidate Herman Faris, who won 5.04% of the popular vote, and even came within 5% of winning Dade County, ahead of Coolidge and La Follette.

== Results ==
1924 United States presidential election in Florida
Party	Candidate	Running mate	Popular vote		Electoral vote	
Party	Candidate	Running mate	Count	%	Count	%
Democratic	John W. Davis of West Virginia	Charles Wayland Bryan of Nebraska	62,083	56.88%	6	100.00%
Republican	Calvin Coolidge of Massachusetts	Charles Dawes of Illinois	30,633	28.06%	0	0.00%
Progressive	Robert M. La Follette of Wisconsin	Burton K. Wheeler of Montana	8,625	7.90%	0	0.00%
Prohibition	Herman Faris of Missouri	Marie C. Brehm of California	5,498	5.04%	0	0.00%
American	Gilbert Nations of District of Columbia	Charles Hiram Randall of California	2,315	2.12%	0	0.00%
Total			109,154	100.00%	6	100.00%

=== Results by county ===
County	John William Davis Democratic		John Calvin Coolidge Republican		Robert Marion La Follette Sr. Progressive		Herman Preston Farris Prohibition		Gilbert Owen Nations American		Total votes cast
County	#	%	#	%	#	%	#	%	#	%	Total votes cast
Alachua	1,995	71.40%	528	18.90%	174	6.23%	55	1.97%	42	1.50%	2,794
Baker	215	56.73%	124	32.72%	25	6.60%	8	2.11%	7	1.85%	379
Bay	838	67.15%	318	25.48%	45	3.61%	37	2.96%	10	0.80%	1,248
Bradford	539	81.67%	94	14.24%	17	2.58%	6	0.91%	4	0.61%	660
Brevard	872	57.94%	515	34.22%	88	5.85%	18	1.20%	12	0.80%	1,505
Broward	421	42.87%	407	41.45%	86	8.76%	46	4.68%	22	2.24%	982
Calhoun	406	78.23%	56	10.79%	37	7.13%	2	0.39%	18	3.47%	519
Charlotte	321	60.00%	167	31.21%	30	5.61%	13	2.43%	4	0.75%	535
Citrus	423	83.76%	30	5.94%	49	9.70%	2	0.40%	1	0.20%	505
Clay	339	57.17%	171	28.84%	71	11.97%	7	1.18%	5	0.84%	593
Collier	148	82.22%	15	8.33%	5	2.78%	11	6.11%	1	0.56%	180
Columbia	776	81.60%	85	8.94%	61	6.41%	24	2.52%	5	0.53%	951
Dade	3,474	32.83%	2,753	26.01%	1,014	9.58%	3,170	29.95%	172	1.63%	10,583
Desoto	641	70.05%	230	25.14%	10	1.09%	29	3.17%	5	0.55%	915
Dixie	257	94.14%	14	5.13%	0	0.00%	2	0.73%	0	0.00%	273
Duval	5,908	51.93%	3,291	28.93%	1,210	10.64%	377	3.31%	590	5.19%	11,376
Escambia	2,290	52.74%	1,274	29.34%	615	14.16%	113	2.60%	50	1.15%	4,342
Flagler	202	54.30%	75	20.16%	65	17.47%	30	8.06%	0	0.00%	372
Franklin	417	76.51%	109	20.00%	16	2.94%	1	0.18%	2	0.37%	545
Gadsden	681	84.91%	47	5.86%	65	8.10%	3	0.37%	6	0.75%	802
Glades	212	61.10%	83	23.92%	25	7.20%	17	4.90%	10	2.88%	347
Hamilton	619	75.30%	143	17.40%	33	4.01%	16	1.95%	11	1.34%	822
Hardee	795	68.24%	264	22.66%	67	5.75%	28	2.40%	11	0.94%	1,165
Hendry	132	76.74%	21	12.21%	11	6.40%	2	1.16%	6	3.49%	172
Hernando	300	74.81%	59	14.71%	36	8.98%	5	1.25%	1	0.25%	401
Highlands	457	57.56%	265	33.38%	58	7.30%	9	1.13%	5	0.63%	794
Hillsborough	4,470	62.26%	1,585	22.08%	765	10.65%	199	2.77%	161	2.24%	7,180
Holmes	658	55.90%	377	32.03%	117	9.94%	15	1.27%	10	0.85%	1,177
Jackson	1,771	80.76%	320	14.59%	82	3.74%	10	0.46%	10	0.46%	2,193
Jefferson	566	83.11%	66	9.69%	43	6.31%	4	0.59%	2	0.29%	681
Lafayette	358	88.18%	33	8.13%	11	2.71%	3	0.74%	1	0.25%	406
Lake	1,381	53.12%	948	36.46%	158	6.08%	54	2.08%	59	2.27%	2,600
Lee	845	52.10%	552	34.03%	80	4.93%	59	3.64%	86	5.30%	1,622
Leon	947	85.32%	92	8.29%	44	3.96%	20	1.80%	7	0.63%	1,110
Levy	524	64.22%	214	26.23%	55	6.74%	14	1.72%	9	1.10%	816
Liberty	193	86.16%	18	8.04%	10	4.46%	1	0.45%	2	0.89%	224
Madison	538	90.73%	23	3.88%	30	5.06%	1	0.17%	1	0.17%	593
Manatee	1,064	55.04%	629	32.54%	181	9.36%	35	1.81%	24	1.24%	1,933
Marion	1,528	73.43%	359	17.25%	94	4.52%	76	3.65%	24	1.15%	2,081
Monroe	835	67.78%	262	21.27%	113	9.17%	11	0.89%	11	0.89%	1,232
Nassau	617	80.65%	106	13.86%	32	4.18%	4	0.52%	6	0.78%	765
Okaloosa	642	67.37%	183	19.20%	83	8.71%	39	4.09%	6	0.63%	953
Okeechobee	182	66.91%	57	20.96%	19	6.99%	11	4.04%	3	1.10%	272
Orange	1,883	45.84%	1,653	40.24%	216	5.26%	143	3.48%	213	5.19%	4,108
Osceola	884	50.20%	589	33.45%	65	3.69%	68	3.86%	155	8.80%	1,761
Palm Beach	1,543	41.25%	1,726	46.14%	375	10.02%	0	0.00%	97	2.59%	3,741
Pasco	780	53.57%	472	32.42%	143	9.82%	43	2.95%	18	1.24%	1,456
Pinellas	2,633	43.57%	2,872	47.53%	302	5.00%	152	2.52%	84	1.39%	6,043
Polk	3,070	57.97%	1,530	28.89%	461	8.70%	171	3.23%	64	1.21%	5,296
Putnam	889	54.41%	574	35.13%	89	5.45%	45	2.75%	37	2.26%	1,634
St. Johns	1,023	54.30%	517	27.44%	187	9.93%	62	3.29%	95	5.04%	1,884
St. Lucie	722	50.92%	524	36.95%	150	10.58%	10	0.71%	12	0.85%	1,418
Santa Rosa	693	70.64%	229	23.34%	38	3.87%	12	1.22%	9	0.92%	981
Sarasota	204	44.16%	187	40.48%	47	10.17%	18	3.90%	6	1.30%	462
Seminole	945	59.58%	372	23.46%	253	15.95%	8	0.50%	8	0.50%	1,586
Sumter	481	70.94%	108	15.93%	73	10.77%	9	1.33%	7	1.03%	678
Suwannee	977	83.65%	111	9.50%	70	5.99%	6	0.51%	4	0.34%	1,168
Taylor	476	78.29%	100	16.45%	7	1.15%	19	3.13%	6	0.99%	608
Union	322	92.53%	16	4.60%	7	2.01%	1	0.29%	2	0.57%	348
Volusia	2,042	51.11%	1,631	40.83%	204	5.11%	75	1.88%	43	1.08%	3,995
Wakulla	332	85.35%	34	8.74%	15	3.86%	7	1.80%	1	0.26%	389
Walton	825	70.39%	220	18.77%	56	4.78%	41	3.50%	30	2.56%	1,172
Washington	562	67.55%	206	24.76%	37	4.45%	21	2.52%	6	0.72%	832
Totals	62,083	56.87%	30,633	28.06%	8,625	7.90%	5,498	5.04%	2,319	2.12%	109,158

== See also ==
- United States presidential elections in Florida
