= United States presidential elections in Florida =

Presidential elections in Florida
- Number of elections: 44
- Voted Democratic: 25
- Voted Republican: 18
- Voted Whig: 1
- Voted other: 0
- Voted for winning candidate: 31
- Voted for losing candidate: 12

Florida is a state in the South Atlantic region of the United States. Since its admission to the Union in March 1845, it has participated in every United States presidential elections, with the 1848 election being the first. In this election, the Whig Party won Florida's three electoral votes with 57.20% of the vote; this was its only victory in the state.

In the realigning 1860 election, Florida was one of the ten slave states that did not provide ballot access to the Republican nominee, Abraham Lincoln. John C. Breckinridge emerged victorious, winning 62.23% of the vote. Shortly after the 1860 election, Florida seceded from the Union and became a part of the Confederacy. As a result, it did not participate in the 1864 presidential election.

With the end of the Civil War, Florida rejoined the Union and participated in the 1868 presidential election. This was the sole presidential election in Florida not decided by the popular vote; instead, the state legislature chose Ulysses S. Grant.

Florida voted for the Republican nominee in all three presidential elections held during the Reconstruction era. Shortly after, white Democrats regained control of the legislature. In 1885, they created a new constitution, followed by statutes through 1889, that disfranchised most Black people and many poor whites. From the end of the Reconstruction era until the 1952 presidential election, the Republican Party only won Florida once, in 1928. According to historian Herbert J. Doherty, the Republicans' victory in that election was mainly because Al Smith, the Democratic nominee, was a Catholic and opposed to Prohibition, causing many members of the Southern Baptist Convention to switch to the Republican Party. The Republican victory in 1952 has been attributed to the emergence of the Pinellas Republican Party, which attracted many voters.

Since the 1952 presidential election, the Democrats have only won Florida five times: in 1964, 1976, 1996, 2008, and 2012. In 2000, George W. Bush led Al Gore by less than 2,000 votes on election day, but as the recount proceeded, the gap between the two sides continued to narrow. In Bush v. Gore, the Bush campaign filed a lawsuit against Gore in the U.S. Supreme Court, arguing that the recounting of votes in certain counties violated the Equal Protection Clause of the U.S. Constitution. The Supreme Court announced the halt of vote recounting. After a lengthy judicial process, Bush eventually won Florida's electoral votes by a margin of only 537 votes out of almost six million cast (0.009%) and, as a result, became the president-elect. However, the result sparked controversy.

Florida was long a swing state; furthermore, it had been seen as a bellwether in presidential elections since 1928, voting for the eventual winner of the presidential election with only three exceptions: 1960, 1992 and 2020. However, with the Republican Party far exceeding its national average in Florida in the 2022 midterm elections, many analysts believe that the state has transitioned from being a Republican-leaning swing state into a reliable red state, with Democratic-leaning trends in Hillsborough County, Orange County, and Osceola County unable to offset Republican gains in Miami-Dade County, Broward County, and Palm Beach County. This proposition was reinforced in 2024, when Republican Donald Trump won the state by 13.1 points, a margin that was 11.6 points greater than the national popular vote.

== Presidential elections ==
Key for parties
American Independent Party – (AI)
Constitutional Union Party – (CU)
Democratic Party – (D)
Dixiecrat Party – (DI)
Ecology Party – (E)
Free Soil Party – (FS)
Green Party – (G)
Independent candidate – (I)
Know Nothing Party – (KN)
Liberal Republican Party – (LR)
Libertarian Party – (LI)
National Democratic Party – (ND)
Populist Party – (PO)
Progressive Party (1912) – (PR-1912)
Progressive Party (1924) – (PR-1924)
Prohibition Party – (PRO)
Reform Party – (RE)
Republican Party – (R)
Socialist Party of America – (S)
Southern Democratic Party – (SD)
Whig Party – (W)
Note – A double dagger (‡) indicates the national winner.

=== 1848 to 1856 ===
Presidential elections in Florida from 1848 to 1856
Year	Winner			Runner-up (nationally)			Other candidate (Note: For purposes of these lists, other national candidates are defined as those who won at least one electoral vote, or won at least ten percent of the vote in multiple states.)			EV	Ref.
Year	Candidate	Votes	%	Candidate	Votes	%	Candidate	Votes	%	EV	Ref.
1848	Zachary Taylor (W)‡	4,120	57.2%	Lewis Cass (D)	3,083	42.8%	Martin Van Buren (FS)	– (Note: Not on ballot)	–	3	
1852	Franklin Pierce (D)‡	4,318	60.03%	Winfield Scott (W)	2,875	39.97%	John P. Hale (FS)	–	–	3	
1856	James Buchanan (D)‡	6,358	56.81%	John C. Frémont (R)	–	–	Millard Fillmore (KN)	4,833	43.19%	3	

=== 1860 and 1864 ===
The election of 1860 was a complex realigning election in which the breakdown of the previous two-party alignment culminated in four parties each competing for influence in different parts of the country. The result of the election, with the victory of an ardent opponent of slavery, spurred the secession of eleven states and brought about the American Civil War.

1860 Presidential election in Florida
Year	Winner		Runner-up		Runner-up		Runner-up		EV	Ref.
Year	Candidate	Votes (%)	Candidate	Votes (%)	Candidate	Votes (%)	Candidate	Votes (%)	EV	Ref.
1860	John C. Breckinridge (SD)	8,277 (62.23%)	John Bell (CU)	4,801 (36.1%)	Stephen A. Douglas (D)	223 (1.68%)	Abraham Lincoln (R)‡	–	4	
1864	Election was not conducted in Florida as it seceded from the Union to join the Confederacy									

=== 1868 to present ===
Presidential elections in Florida from 1864 to present
Year	Winner			Runner-up			Other candidate (Note: For purposes of these lists, other candidates are defined as those who were in third place in Florida.)			EV	Ref.
Year	Candidate	Votes	%	Candidate	Votes	%	Candidate	Votes	%	EV	Ref.
1868	Ulysses S. Grant (R)‡	–	–	Horatio Seymour (D)	–	–	–	–	–	3	(Note: Due to the status of Reconstruction, no election was held; the three electoral votes were allocated by the Florida State Legislature to Grant.)
1872	Ulysses S. Grant (R)‡	17,763	53.52%	Horace Greeley (LR)	15,427	46.48%	–	–	–	4	
1876	Rutherford B. Hayes (R)‡	23,849	50.99%	Samuel J. Tilden (D)	22,927	49.01%	–	–	–	4	
1880	Winfield S. Hancock (D)	27,964	54.17%	James A. Garfield (R)‡	23,654	45.83%	–	–	–	4	
1884	Grover Cleveland (D)‡	31,769	52.96%	James G. Blaine (R)	28,031	46.73%	John St. John (PRO)	72	0.12%	4	
1888	Grover Cleveland (D)	39,557	59.48%	Benjamin Harrison (R)‡	26,529	39.89%	Clinton Fisk (PRO)	414	0.62%	4	
1892	Grover Cleveland (D)‡	30,153	85.01%	James B. Weaver (PO)	4,843	13.65%	John Bidwell (PRO)	475	1.34%	4	
1896	William Jennings Bryan (D)	32,756	70.46%	William McKinley (R)‡	11,298	24.3%	John M. Palmer (ND)	1778	3.82%	4	
1900	William Jennings Bryan (D)	28,273	71.31%	William McKinley (R)‡	7,355	18.55%	John G. Woolley (PRO)	2,244	5.66%	4	
1904	Alton B. Parker (D)	27,046	68.82%	Theodore Roosevelt (R)‡	8,314	21.15%	Eugene V. Debs (S)	2,337	5.95%	5	
1908	William Jennings Bryan (D)	31,104	63.01%	William Howard Taft (R)‡	10,654	21.58%	Eugene V. Debs (S)	3,747	7.59%	5	
1912	Woodrow Wilson (D)‡	35,343	69.52%	Eugene V. Debs (S)	4,806	9.45%	Theodore Roosevelt (PR-1912)	4,555	8.96%	6	
1916	Woodrow Wilson (D)‡	55,984	69.34%	Charles Evans Hughes (R)	14,611	18.1%	Allan L. Benson (S)	5,353	6.63%	6	
1920	James M. Cox (D)	90,515	62.13%	Warren Harding (R)‡	44,853	30.79%	Eugene V. Debs (S)	5,189	3.56%	6	
1924	John W. Davis (D)	62,083	56.88%	Calvin Coolidge (R)‡	30,633	28.06%	Robert M. La Follette (PR-1924)	8,625	7.9%	6	
1928	Herbert Hoover (R)‡	144,168	56.83%	Al Smith (D)	101,764	40.12%	Norman Thomas (S)	4,036	1.59%	6	
1932	Franklin D. Roosevelt (D)‡	206,307	74.49%	Herbert Hoover (R)	69,170	24.98%	Norman Thomas (S)	775	0.28%	7	
1936	Franklin D. Roosevelt (D)‡	249,117	76.08%	Alfred Landon (R)	78,248	23.9%	Norman Thomas (S)	9	≈0%	7	
1940	Franklin D. Roosevelt (D)‡	359,334	73.99%	Wendell Willkie (R)	126,158	25.98%	Various candidates (Write-ins)	148	0.03%	7	
1944	Franklin D. Roosevelt (D)‡	339,377	70.29%	Thomas Dewey (R)	143,215	29.66%	Various candidates (Write-ins)	211	0.04%	8	
1948	Harry Truman (D)‡	281,988	48.82%	Thomas Dewey (R)	194,280	33.63%	Strom Thurmond (DI)	89,755	15.54%	8	
1952	Dwight D. Eisenhower (R)‡	544,036	54.99%	Adlai Stevenson II (D)	444,950	44.97%	Various candidates (Write-ins)	351	0.04%	10	
1956	Dwight D. Eisenhower (R)‡	643,849	57.19%	Adlai Stevenson II (D)	480,371	42.67%	Various candidates (Write-ins)	1,542	0.14%	10	
1960	Richard Nixon (R)	795,476	51.51%	John F. Kennedy (D)‡	748,700	48.49%	–	–	–	10	
1964	Lyndon B. Johnson (D)‡	948,540	51.14%	Barry Goldwater (R)	905,941	48.84%	–	–	–	14	
1968	Richard Nixon (R)‡	886,804	40.53%	Hubert Humphrey (D)	676,794	30.93%	George Wallace (AI)	624,207	28.53%	14	
1972	Richard Nixon (R)‡	1,857,759	71.91%	George McGovern (D)	718,117	27.8%	Various candidates (Write-ins)	7,407	0.29%	17	
1976	Jimmy Carter (D)‡	1,636,000	51.93%	Gerald Ford (R)	1,469,531	46.64%	Eugene McCarthy (I)	23,643	0.75%	17	
1980	Ronald Reagan (R)‡	2,046,951	55.52%	Jimmy Carter (D)	1,419,475	38.5%	John B. Anderson (I)	189,692	5.14%	17	
1984	Ronald Reagan (R)‡	2,730,350	65.32%	Walter Mondale (D)	1,448,816	34.66%	David Bergland (LI)	754	0.02%	21	
1988	George H. W. Bush (R)‡	2,618,885	60.87%	Michael Dukakis (D)	1,656,701	38.51%	Ron Paul (LI)	19,796	0.46%	21	
1992	George H. W. Bush (R)	2,173,310	40.89%	Bill Clinton (D)‡	2,072,698	39%	Ross Perot (I)	1,053,067	19.82%	25	
1996	Bill Clinton (D)‡	2,546,870	48.02%	Bob Dole (R)	2,244,536	42.32%	Ross Perot (RE)	483,870	9.12%	25	
2000	George W. Bush (R)‡	2,912,790	48.85%	Al Gore (D)	2,912,253	48.84%	Ralph Nader (G)	97,488	1.63%	25	
2004	George W. Bush (R)‡	3,964,522	52.1%	John Kerry (D)	3,583,544	47.09%	Ralph Nader (RE)	32,971	0.43%	27	
2008	Barack Obama (D)‡	4,282,074	50.91%	John McCain (R)	4,045,624	48.09%	Ralph Nader (E)	28,128	0.33%	27	
2012	Barack Obama (D)‡	4,237,756	50.01%	Mitt Romney (R)	4,163,447	49.13%	Gary Johnson (LI)	44,726	0.53%	29	
2016	Donald Trump (Note: Changed his home state from State of New York to Florida during his first presidency.) (R)‡	4,617,886	49.02%	Hillary Clinton (D)	4,504,975	47.82%	Gary Johnson (LI)	207,043	2.2%	29	
2020	Donald Trump (R)	5,668,731	51.22%	Joe Biden (D)‡	5,297,045	47.86%	Jo Jorgensen (LI)	70,324	0.64%	29	
2024	Donald Trump (R) ‡	6,110,125	56.09%	Kamala Harris (D)	4,683,038	42.99%	Jill Stein (G)	43,155	0.4%	30	

==== Graph ====
US presidential popular-vote margin in Florida (D+, R−)

== Results Maps ==
1976 United States presidential election

1980 United States presidential election

1984 United States presidential election

1988 United States presidential election

1992 United States presidential election

1996 United States presidential election

2000 United States presidential election

2004 United States presidential election

2008 United States presidential election

2012 United States presidential election

2016 United States presidential election

2020 United States presidential election

2024 United States presidential election

== See also ==
- Elections in Florida
- List of United States presidential election results by state

== Works cited ==
- Guide to U.S. Elections. SAGE Publications. 2010. ISBN 978-1-60426-536-1.
- Burnham, Walter Dean (1955). Presidential ballots, 1836–1892. Johns Hopkins University Press. LCCN 55008428. OL 6176796M.
- Presidential elections, 1789–1996. Congressional Quarterly. 1997. ISBN 978-1-56802-065-5. LCCN 97019084. OL 673017M.
