= 1884 United States presidential election in Florida =

- November 4, 1884
- Turnout: 22.26% of the total population ▲3.11 pp

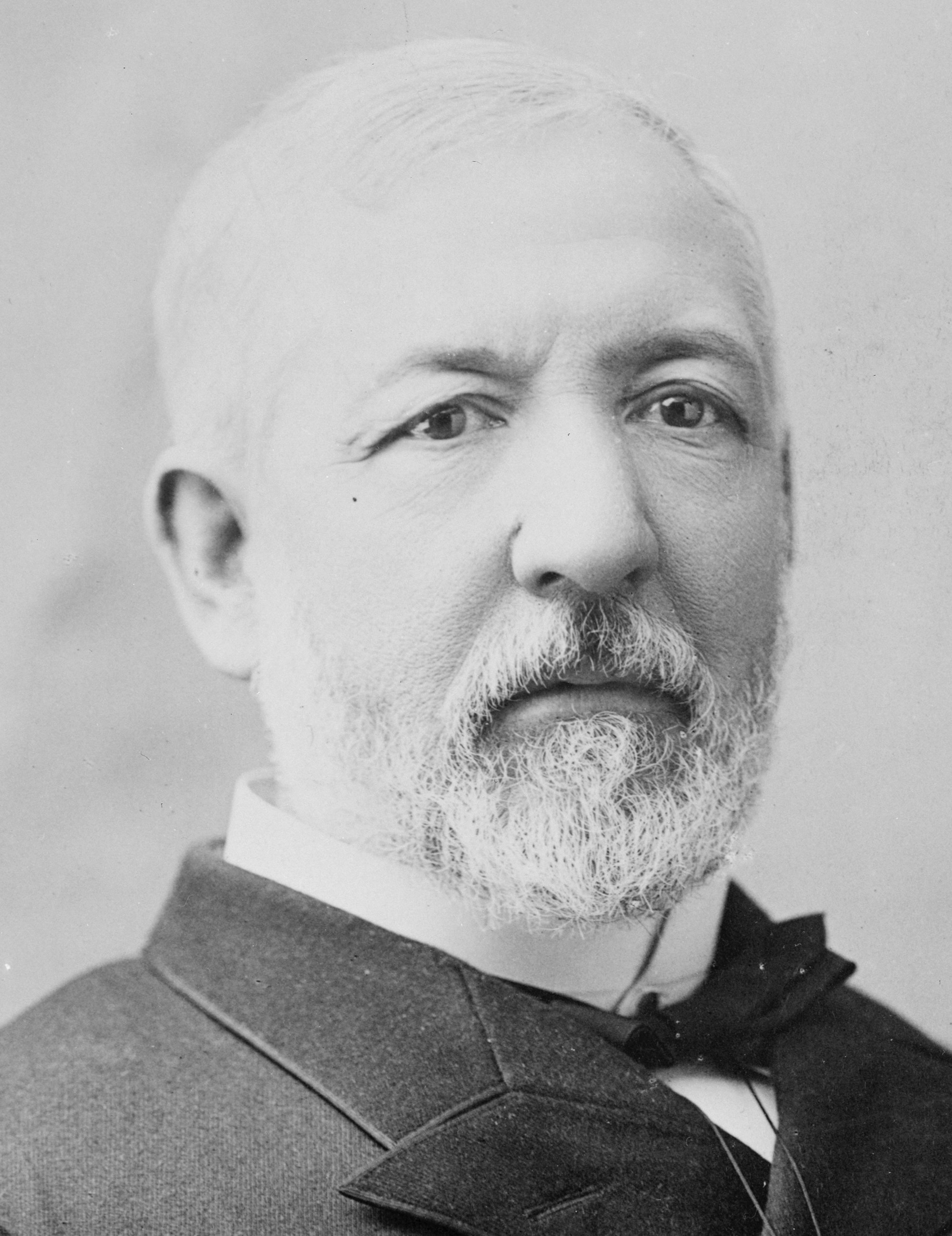
Nominee	Grover Cleveland	James G. Blaine
Party	Democratic	Republican
Home state	New York	Maine
Running mate	Thomas A. Hendricks	John A. Logan
Electoral vote	4	0
Popular vote	31,769	28,031
Percentage	52.96%	46.73%
County results
Cleveland
50–60%
60–70%
70–80%
80–90%
90–100%
Blaine
50–60%
60–70%
70–80%
President before election
Chester A. Arthur
Republican
Elected President
Grover Cleveland
Democratic

The 1884 United States presidential election in Florida took place on November 4, 1884, as part of the 1884 United States presidential election. Florida voters chose four representatives, or electors, to the Electoral College, who voted for president and vice president.

Florida was won by Grover Cleveland, the 28th governor of New York, (D–New York), running with the former governor of Indiana Thomas A. Hendricks, with 52.96% of the popular vote, against Secretary of State James G. Blaine (R-Maine), running with Senator John A. Logan, with 46.73% of the vote.

== Results ==
1884 United States presidential election in Florida
Party	Candidate	Running mate	Popular vote		Electoral vote	
Party	Candidate	Running mate	Count	%	Count	%
Democratic	Grover Cleveland of New York	Thomas A. Hendricks of Indiana	31,769	52.96%	4	100.00%
Republican	James G. Blaine of Maine	John A. Logan of Illinois	28,031	46.73%	0	0.00%
Write-in	Write-in of	Write-in of	118	0.20%	0	0.00%
Prohibition	John St. John of Kansas	William Daniel of Maryland	72	0.12%	0	0.00%
Total			59,990	100.00%	4	100.00%

=== Results by county ===
County	Stephen Grover Cleveland Democratic		James Gillespie Blaine Republican		Various candidates Write-ins		Margin		Total votes cast
County	#	%	#	%	#	%	#	%	Total votes cast
Alachua	1,742	45.45%	2,091	54.55%			-349	-9.11%	3,833
Baker	337	65.69%	176	34.31%			161	31.38%	513
Bradford	961	74.61%	327	25.39%			634	49.22%	1,288
Brevard	306	73.56%	110	26.44%			196	47.12%	416
Calhoun	200	59.17%	138	40.83%			62	18.34%	338
Clay	500	61.35%	315	38.65%			185	22.70%	815
Columbia	1,051	52.18%	963	47.82%			88	4.37%	2,014
Dade	40	59.70%	27	40.30%			13	19.40%	67
Duval	1,890	35.82%	3,387	64.18%			-1,497	-28.37%	5,277
Escambia	1,896	50.47%	1,861	49.53%			35	0.93%	3,757
Franklin	276	56.10%	216	43.90%			60	12.20%	492
Gadsden	1,050	54.38%	881	45.62%			169	8.75%	1,931
Hamilton	659	54.06%	560	45.94%			99	8.12%	1,219
Hernando	1,040	79.39%	270	20.61%			770	58.78%	1,310
Hillsborough	1,257	78.07%	353	21.93%			904	56.15%	1,610
Holmes	399	84.36%	74	15.64%			325	68.71%	473
Jackson	1,420	55.56%	1,136	44.44%			284	11.11%	2,556
Jefferson	744	32.79%	1,525	67.21%			-781	-34.42%	2,269
Lafayette	383	88.86%	48	11.14%			335	77.73%	431
Leon	834	27.51%	2,198	72.49%			-1,364	-44.99%	3,032
Levy	654	65.99%	337	34.01%			317	31.99%	991
Liberty	162	63.28%	94	36.72%			68	26.56%	256
Madison	558	48.61%	590	51.39%			-32	-2.79%	1,148
Manatee	670	75.62%	216	24.38%			454	51.24%	886
Marion	1,494	42.67%	2,007	57.33%			-513	-14.65%	3,501
Monroe	888	49.50%	906	50.50%			-18	-1.00%	1,794
Nassau	761	45.76%	902	54.24%			-141	-8.48%	1,663
Orange	1,867	62.71%	1,110	37.29%			757	25.43%	2,977
Polk	755	92.41%	62	7.59%			693	84.82%	817
Putnam	1,094	48.36%	1,168	51.64%			-74	-3.27%	2,262
St. John's	727	58.58%	514	41.42%			213	17.16%	1,241
Santa Rosa	804	63.06%	471	36.94%			333	26.12%	1,275
Sumter	1,125	68.22%	524	31.78%			601	36.45%	1,649
Suwannee	978	55.76%	776	44.24%			202	11.52%	1,754
Taylor	209	60.76%	135	39.24%			74	21.51%	344
Volusia	878	51.92%	813	48.08%			65	3.84%	1,691
Wakulla	375	68.93%	169	31.07%			206	37.87%	544
Walton	484	61.42%	304	38.58%			180	22.84%	788
Washington	319	58.11%	230	41.89%			89	16.21%	549
Totals	31,769	52.96%	28,031	46.73%	190	0.32%	3,738	6.23%	59,990

== See also ==
- United States presidential elections in Florida
