= 1904 United States presidential election in Florida =

- November 8, 1904
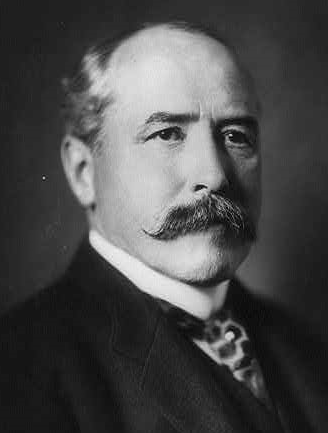

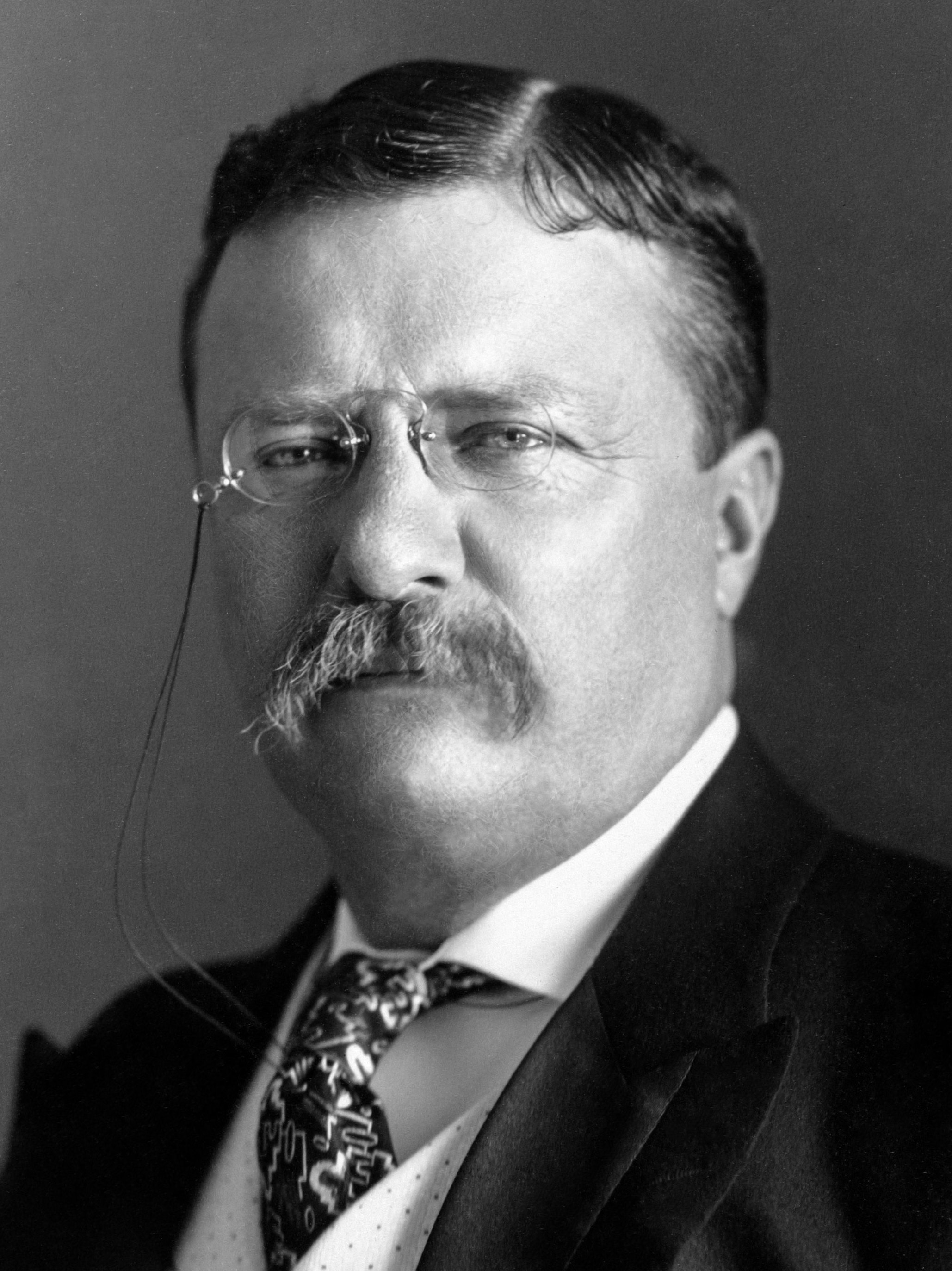

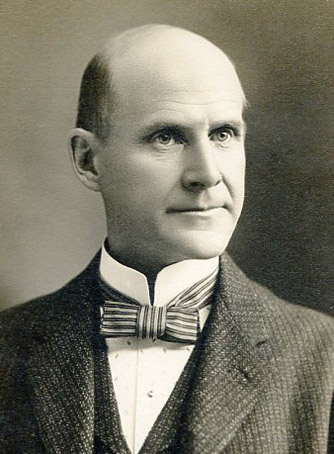
Nominee	Alton B. Parker	Theodore Roosevelt	Eugene V. Debs
Party	Democratic	Republican	Socialist
Home state	New York	New York	Indiana
Running mate	Henry G. Davis	Charles W. Fairbanks	Ben Hanford
Electoral vote	5	0	0
Popular vote	27,046	8,314	2,337
Percentage	68.80%	21.15%	5.95%
County results
Parker
40–50%
50–60%
60–70%
70–80%
80–90%
President before election
Theodore Roosevelt
Republican
Elected President
Theodore Roosevelt
Republican

The 1904 United States presidential election in Florida was held on November 8, 1904. Voter chose five representatives, or electors to the Electoral College, who voted for President and Vice-president.

With the disfranchisement of African-Americans by a poll tax in 1889, Florida became a one-party Democratic state, which it was to remain until the 1950s—apart from the anti-Catholic vote against Al Smith in 1928. Unlike Texas with its German settlements in the Edwards Plateau, or those Southern states that extended into the Appalachian Mountains or Ozarks, Florida completely lacked upland or German refugee whites opposed to secession. Thus, Florida's Republican Party between 1872 and 1888 was entirely dependent upon black votes, a fact graphically seen when one considers that – although very few blacks in Florida had ever voted within the previous fifty-five years – at the time of the landmark court case of Smith v. Allwright (1944), half of Florida's registered Republicans were still black. Thus, disfranchisement of blacks and poor whites left Florida as devoid of Republican adherents as Louisiana, Mississippi or South Carolina.

Nevertheless, Florida's one-party Democratic rule was to be marginally interrupted in the 1900s by considerable Socialist and Populist growth, centered in Tampa and Jacksonville, and southern Lee County with its "Koreshan Unity" sect. Immigrants and farmers fearing loss of tenure were able to give over ten percent of the vote in several counties of Central and South Florida to Eugene V. Debs―in the second of his five Presidential runs―and substantial votes in many pineywoods counties to Populist Thomas E. Watson. However, this did not threaten the Democrats' monopoly on statewide power except in Calhoun County, which Democratic nominee Alton B. Parker held by just two votes and which William Jennings Bryan was to lose in 1908.

Florida was won by the Democratic nominees, former Chief Judge of the New York Court of Appeals Alton B. Parker and his running mate, former US Senator Henry G. Davis of West Virginia. They defeated the Republican nominees, incumbent President Theodore Roosevelt of New York and his running mate Charles W. Fairbanks of Indiana. Parker won the state by a landslide margin of 47.65%.

== Results ==
1904 United States presidential election in Florida
Party	Candidate	Votes	Percentage	Electoral votes
Democrat	Alton B. Parker	27,046	68.80%	5
Republican	Theodore Roosevelt (incumbent)	8,314	21.15%	0
Socialist	Eugene V. Debs	2,337	5.95%	0
People's	Thomas E. Watson	1,605	4.08%	0
Write-ins (Note: These write-in votes were not listed by county.)	—	7	0.02%	0
Totals		39,302	100.00%	5

=== Results by county ===
County	Alton Brooks Parker Democratic		Theodore Roosevelt Republican		Eugene Victor Debs Socialist		Thomas E. Watson People's		Margin		Total votes cast
County	#	%	#	%	#	%	#	%	#	%	Total votes cast
Alachua	1,277	66.41%	543	28.24%	58	3.02%	45	2.34%	734	38.17%	1,923
Baker	207	61.06%	120	35.40%	12	3.54%	0	0.00%	87	25.66%	339
Bradford	633	79.32%	124	15.54%	26	3.26%	15	1.88%	509	63.78%	798
Brevard	553	77.78%	125	17.58%	30	4.22%	3	0.42%	428	60.20%	711
Calhoun	162	40.81%	160	40.30%	21	5.29%	54	13.60%	2	0.50%	397
Citrus	369	88.49%	21	5.04%	17	4.08%	10	2.40%	348	83.45%	417
Clay	247	76.00%	50	15.38%	26	8.00%	2	0.62%	197	60.62%	325
Columbia	595	60.22%	317	32.09%	33	3.34%	43	4.35%	278	28.14%	988
Dade	887	69.57%	307	24.08%	59	4.63%	22	1.73%	580	45.49%	1,275
De Soto	721	71.32%	188	18.60%	26	2.57%	76	7.52%	533	52.72%	1,011
Duval	2,011	65.65%	671	21.91%	235	7.67%	146	4.77%	1,340	43.75%	3,063
Escambia	1,573	72.86%	497	23.02%	66	3.06%	23	1.07%	1,076	49.84%	2,159
Franklin	336	69.28%	144	29.69%	2	0.41%	3	0.62%	192	39.59%	485
Gadsden	471	87.87%	54	10.07%	4	0.75%	7	1.31%	417	77.80%	536
Hamilton	455	71.99%	155	24.53%	6	0.95%	16	2.53%	300	47.47%	632
Hernando	172	85.57%	12	5.97%	6	2.99%	11	5.47%	160	79.60%	201
Hillsborough	1,976	62.71%	516	16.38%	441	14.00%	218	6.92%	1,460	46.33%	3,151
Holmes	284	60.04%	140	29.60%	16	3.38%	33	6.98%	144	30.44%	473
Jackson	1,186	68.59%	354	20.47%	96	5.55%	93	5.38%	832	48.12%	1,729
Jefferson	471	77.34%	123	20.20%	9	1.48%	6	0.99%	348	57.14%	609
Lafayette	275	63.36%	122	28.11%	20	4.61%	17	3.92%	153	35.25%	434
Lake	529	72.66%	148	20.33%	33	4.53%	18	2.47%	381	52.34%	728
Lee	266	53.96%	84	17.04%	122	24.75%	21	4.26%	144 (Note: In this county, where Debs ran second ahead of Roosevelt, the margin given is Parker vote minus Debs vote, and the percentage margin is Parker percentage minus Debs percentage.)	29.21%	493
Leon	649	87.82%	84	11.37%	4	0.54%	2	0.27%	565	76.45%	739
Levy	426	69.38%	151	24.59%	20	3.26%	17	2.77%	275	44.79%	614
Liberty	143	71.14%	50	24.88%	3	1.49%	5	2.49%	93	46.27%	201
Madison	595	87.76%	66	9.73%	12	1.77%	5	0.74%	529	78.02%	678
Manatee	592	69.24%	91	10.64%	124	14.50%	48	5.61%	501	58.60%	855
Marion	1,091	75.14%	230	15.84%	69	4.75%	62	4.27%	861	59.30%	1,452
Monroe	680	61.21%	287	25.83%	75	6.75%	69	6.21%	393	35.37%	1,111
Nassau	509	67.33%	161	21.30%	56	7.41%	30	3.97%	348	46.03%	756
Orange	874	70.09%	315	25.26%	42	3.37%	16	1.28%	559	44.83%	1,247
Osceola	271	76.77%	65	18.41%	12	3.40%	5	1.42%	206	58.36%	353
Pasco	453	79.47%	96	16.84%	10	1.75%	11	1.93%	357	62.63%	570
Polk	869	81.44%	125	11.72%	57	5.34%	16	1.50%	744	69.73%	1,067
Putnam	562	69.13%	210	25.83%	16	1.97%	25	3.08%	352	43.30%	813
St. Johns	550	56.76%	204	21.05%	148	15.27%	67	6.91%	346	35.71%	969
Santa Rosa	403	73.41%	73	13.30%	46	8.38%	27	4.92%	330	60.11%	549
Sumter	316	63.20%	61	12.20%	55	11.00%	68	13.60%	248 (Note: In this county, where Watson ran second ahead of Roosevelt, the margin given is Parker vote minus Watson vote, and the percentage margin is Parker percentage minus Watson percentage.)	49.60%	500
Suwannee	584	75.84%	125	16.23%	29	3.77%	32	4.16%	459	59.61%	770
Taylor	168	53.00%	119	37.54%	4	1.26%	26	8.20%	49	15.46%	317
Volusia	654	62.29%	263	25.05%	70	6.67%	63	6.00%	391	37.24%	1,050
Wakulla	233	82.33%	39	13.78%	10	3.53%	1	0.35%	194	68.55%	283
Walton	354	46.89%	322	42.65%	44	5.83%	35	4.64%	32	4.24%	755
Washington	414	53.35%	202	26.03%	67	8.63%	93	11.98%	212	27.32%	776
Totals	27,046	68.82%	8,314	21.15%	2,337	5.95%	1,605	4.08%	18,732	47.66%	39,302

== See also ==
- United States presidential elections in Florida
