= Thomas Young Simons =

American politician

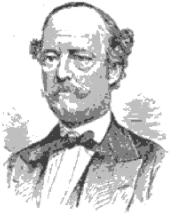

Member of the South Carolina General Assembly
- In office 1854–1860
- Constituency: Charleston

Personal details
- Born: October 1, 1828 Charleston, South Carolina
- Died: April 30, 1878 (aged 49) Charleston, South Carolina
- Party: Democratic; Union Reform
- Spouse: Annie L. Ancram (m. 1852)
- Education: Yale College
- Occupation: Lawyer, politician

Thomas Young Simons (October 1, 1828 – April 30, 1878) was an American lawyer and politician.

== Biography ==
Simons, third son of Dr. Thomas Y. Simons, was born in Charleston, S. C., October 1, 1828. He graduated from Yale College in 1847.

For two years after leaving college, he taught in the Charleston High School, preparing himself at the same time for admission to the bar. In 1850 he was admitted to practice, and except during the period covered by the American Civil War, continued to practice uninterruptedly in Charleston to the time of his death.

He married Annie L. Ancram in July 1852.

He represented his native city in the South Carolina General Assembly from 1854 to 1860, and in the latter year was one of the Democratic Presidential electors for South Carolina. He was also a member of the State Convention which passed the ordinance of secession in December 1860, and during the war which followed served as an officer in the Confederate service, first as Captain of the 27th Regiment, S. C. Volunteers, and later as Judge Advocate.

In September 1865, he became editor-in-chief of the Charleston Courier, and continued to act in this capacity until April 1873. This, joined with the labors of a lawyer in large practice, did much to impair his strength and to lay the foundation for his last illness. In the later years of his life he was prominently identified with the efforts to secure local self-government and the creation of a Union Reform party, in South Carolina. He died after a long illness, in Charleston, April 30, 1878, in his 50th year.
