= 1868 United States presidential election in Florida =

- November 3, 1868
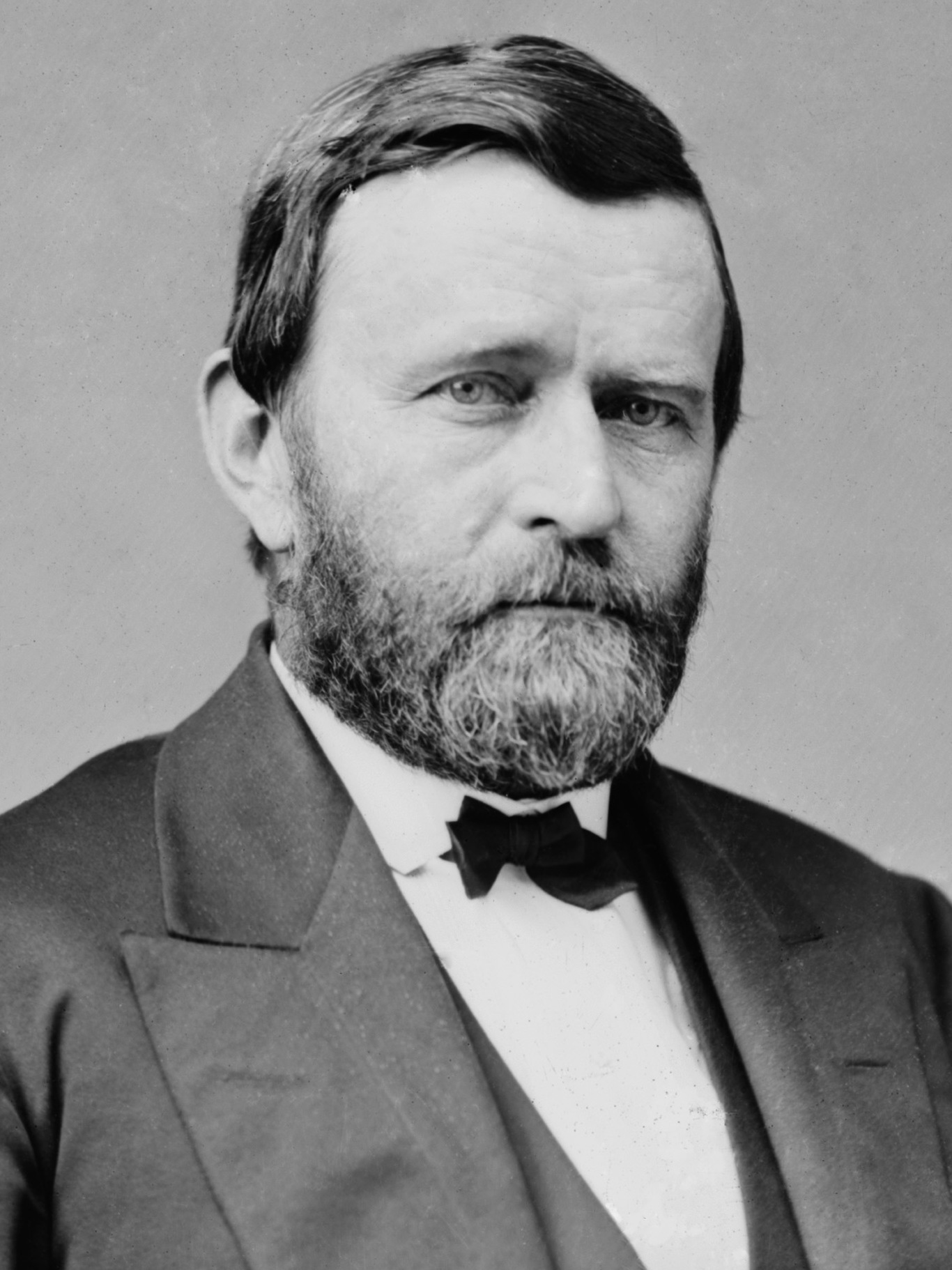
Nominee	Ulysses S. Grant
Party	Republican
Home state	Illinois
Running mate	Schuyler Colfax
Electoral vote	3
President before election
Andrew Johnson
Democratic
Elected President
Ulysses S. Grant
Republican

The 1868 United States presidential election in Florida took place on November 3, 1868, as part of the 1868 United States presidential election. The state legislature chose three representatives, or electors to the Electoral College, who voted for president and vice president. The vote in the legislature was 40 Republicans to 9 Democrats.

Florida voted for the Republican nominee, Ulysses S. Grant.

As a result of the status of Reconstruction, the state's three electoral votes were allocated by the State Legislature to Grant. This was the only time in the state's history that the popular vote did not decide the election in the state, as well as one of only two times nationally after the American Civil War (along with Colorado in 1876).

== Results ==
United States presidential election in Florida, 1868
Party	Candidate	Running mate	Popular vote		Electoral vote	
Party	Candidate	Running mate	Count	%	Count	%
Republican	Ulysses S. Grant of Illinois	Schuyler Colfax of Indiana	–	–	3	100.00%

== See also ==
- United States presidential elections in Florida
