= 1892 United States presidential election in Florida =

- November 8, 1892

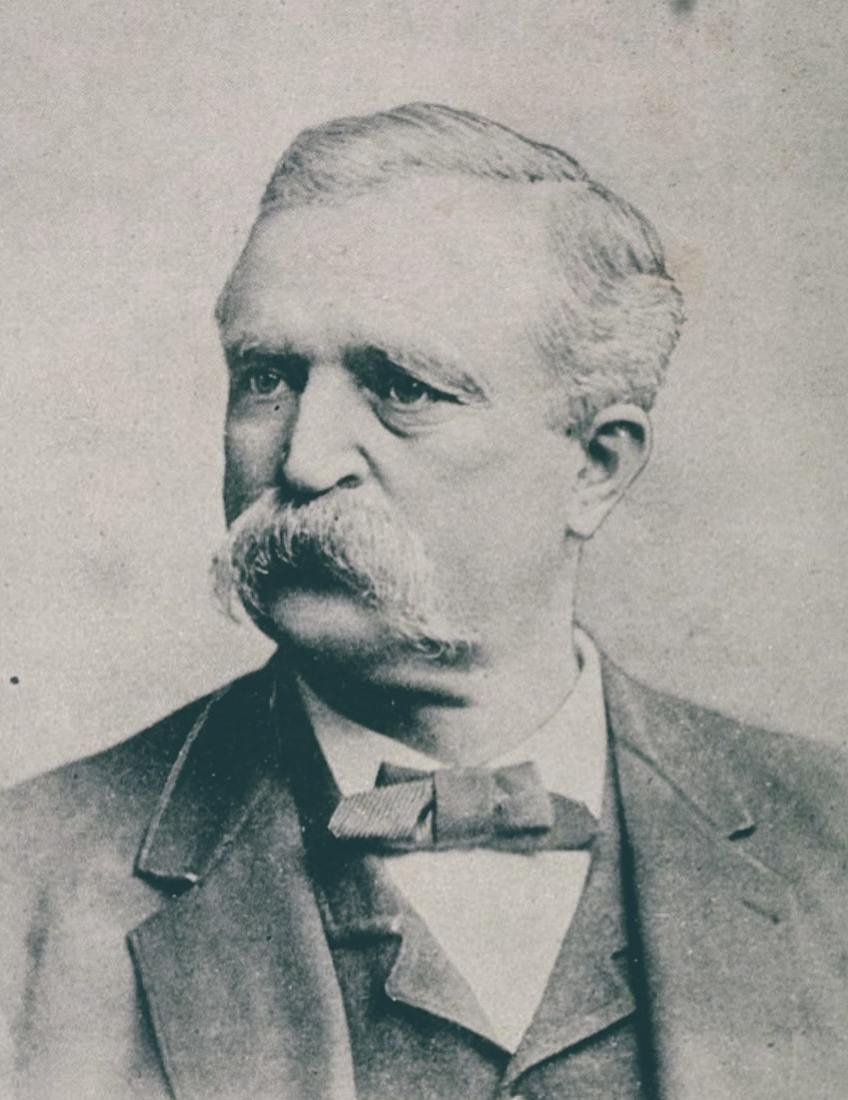
Nominee	Grover Cleveland	James B. Weaver
Party	Democratic	Populist
Alliance		Republican
Home state	New York	Iowa
Running mate	Adlai Stevenson I	James G. Field
Electoral vote	4	0
Popular vote	30,153	4,843
Percentage	85.01%	13.65%
County results
Cleveland
50–60%
60–70%
70–80%
80–90%
90–100%
President before election
Benjamin Harrison
Republican
Elected President
Grover Cleveland
Democratic

The 1892 United States presidential election in Florida took place on November 8, 1892. All contemporary 44 states were part of the 1892 United States presidential election. Florida voters chose four electors to the Electoral College, which selected the president and vice president.

This election marks the end of Reconstruction and the beginning of Jim Crow-era politics in Florida. This change had been proposed as early as 1884, but the anti-Southern animus of the Harrison regime meant that Florida's large landowners felt the disfranchisement of blacks had become urgent. A poll tax was introduced in 1889 as were the so-called “Myers” and “Dortch” laws which required voters in more populous settlements to register their voting precincts. This dramatically cut voter registration amongst blacks and poorer whites, almost halving the number of votes cast. Since Florida completely lacked upland or German refugee whites opposed to secession, its Republican Party between 1872 and 1888 was entirely dependent upon black votes. Thus this disfranchisement of blacks and poor whites by a poll tax introduced in 1889 left Florida as devoid of Republican adherents as Louisiana, Mississippi or South Carolina.

Thus, Florida's few remaining Republicans decided not to put up presidential electors and urged their supporters to back Populist James B. Weaver, creating the first case where an incumbent president standing for re-election has not been on all state's ballots. (Note: This has occurred three times since. William Howard Taft in 1912 was not on the ballot in either California or South Dakota, while Harry S. Truman in 1948 and Lyndon Johnson in 1964 were both kept off the Alabama ballot.) This would also mark the last time a Republican nominee was not a candidate in every state in the Union. Weaver thought he had “magnificent” chances in the impoverished South, and campaigned heavily there. As it turned out, the halving of the electorate meant he could gain very little support, and Weaver was not helped by his controversial decision to take a woman – Mary Elizabeth Lease – on his campaigns, as the South thought any political involvement degraded womanhood. Weaver did nonetheless win counties in Alabama, Georgia, Mississippi, North Carolina, and Texas.

Florida was won in a landslide by the Democratic nominees, former President Grover Cleveland of New York and his running mate Adlai Stevenson I of Illinois in what remains as the best performance in Florida as of 2024. Weaver took what remained of the Black Republican vote, but gained less than 14%; nonetheless this is one of only five times in Florida that a candidate other than a Republican, Democrat, or Whig (the Democrat's main opposition before the formation of the Republican Party) got over 10% of the vote. (Note: The others are Constitutional Unionist John Bell in 1860, States’ Rights Democrat Strom Thurmond in 1948, American Independent George Wallace in 1968 and Ross Perot in 1992.)

== Results ==
1892 United States presidential election in Florida
Party	Candidate	Votes	Percentage	Electoral votes
Democratic	Grover Cleveland	30,153	85.01%	4
People's	James B. Weaver	4,843	13.65%	0
Prohibition	John Bidwell	475	1.34%	0
Totals		35,471	100.00%	4
Voter turnout				—

=== Results by county ===
	Stephen Grover Cleveland Democratic		James Baird Weaver People's		John Bidwell Prohibition		Margin		Total votes cast
County	#	%	#	%	#	%	#	%	#
Alachua	1,447	84.27%	234	13.63%	36	2.10%	1,213	70.65%	1,717
Baker	187	54.84%	154	45.16%	0	0.00%	33	9.68%	341
Bradford	551	79.39%	139	20.03%	4	0.58%	412	59.37%	694
Brevard	449	88.74%	36	7.11%	21	4.15%	413	81.62%	506
Calhoun	155	73.46%	56	26.54%	0	0.00%	99	46.92%	211
Citrus	316	80.82%	71	18.16%	4	1.02%	245	62.66%	391
Clay	404	85.41%	68	14.38%	1	0.21%	336	71.04%	473
Columbia	822	94.16%	49	5.61%	2	0.23%	773	88.55%	873
Dade	109	95.61%	1	0.88%	4	3.51%	105 (Note: In this county where Bidwell ran second ahead of Weaver, margin given is Cleveland vote minus Bidwell vote and percentage margin Cleveland percentage minus Bidwell percentage.)	92.11%	114
De Soto	566	68.61%	256	31.03%	3	0.36%	310	37.58%	825
Duval	1,442	95.18%	68	4.49%	5	0.33%	1,374	90.69%	1,515
Escambia	2,616	95.37%	127	4.63%	0	0.00%	2,489	90.74%	2,743
Franklin	304	100.00%	0	0.00%	0	0.00%	304	100.00%	304
Gadsden	522	91.90%	46	8.10%	0	0.00%	476	83.80%	568
Hamilton	605	79.19%	159	20.81%	0	0.00%	446	58.38%	764
Hernando	227	73.23%	81	26.13%	2	0.65%	146	47.10%	310
Hillsborough	2,718	95.60%	58	2.04%	67	2.36%	2,660	93.56%	2,843
Holmes	285	66.28%	145	33.72%	0	0.00%	140	32.56%	430
Jackson	1,091	79.12%	288	20.88%	0	0.00%	803	58.23%	1,379
Jefferson	1,533	100.00%	0	0.00%	0	0.00%	1,533	100.00%	1,533
Lafayette	258	90.53%	27	9.47%	0	0.00%	231	81.05%	285
Lake	1,137	85.68%	105	7.91%	85	6.41%	1,032	77.77%	1,327
Lee	153	96.23%	5	3.14%	1	0.63%	148	93.08%	159
Leon	634	100.00%	0	0.00%	0	0.00%	634	100.00%	634
Levy	436	71.59%	172	28.24%	1	0.16%	264	43.35%	609
Liberty	84	54.19%	71	45.81%	0	0.00%	13	8.39%	155
Madison	855	95.64%	39	4.36%	0	0.00%	816	91.28%	894
Manatee	348	83.25%	62	14.83%	8	1.91%	286	68.42%	418
Marion	1,133	67.32%	533	31.67%	17	1.01%	600	35.65%	1,683
Monroe	767	90.98%	67	7.95%	9	1.07%	700	83.04%	843
Nassau	597	98.84%	7	1.16%	0	0.00%	590	97.68%	604
Orange	1,142	92.10%	39	3.15%	59	4.76%	1,083	87.34%	1,240
Osceola	259	94.18%	13	4.73%	3	1.09%	246	89.45%	275
Pasco	471	83.22%	92	16.25%	3	0.53%	379	66.96%	566
Polk	801	80.66%	168	16.92%	24	2.42%	633	63.75%	993
Putnam	885	78.74%	174	15.48%	65	5.78%	711	63.26%	1,124
Santa Rosa	452	83.86%	87	16.14%	0	0.00%	365	67.72%	539
St. Johns	589	95.46%	28	4.54%	0	0.00%	561	90.92%	617
Sumter	444	59.28%	305	40.72%	0	0.00%	139	18.56%	749
Suwannee	648	71.52%	258	28.48%	0	0.00%	390	43.05%	906
Taylor	125	52.30%	114	47.70%	0	0.00%	11	4.60%	239
Volusia	785	85.14%	91	9.87%	46	4.99%	694	75.27%	922
Wakulla	173	94.54%	10	5.46%	0	0.00%	163	89.07%	183
Walton	313	53.05%	274	46.44%	3	0.51%	39	6.61%	590
Washington	315	82.25%	66	17.23%	2	0.52%	249	65.01%	383
Totals	30,153	85.01%	4,843	13.65%	475	1.34%	25,310	71.35%	35,471

== See also ==
- United States presidential elections in Florida
