= 1876 United States presidential election in Colorado =

- November 7, 1876
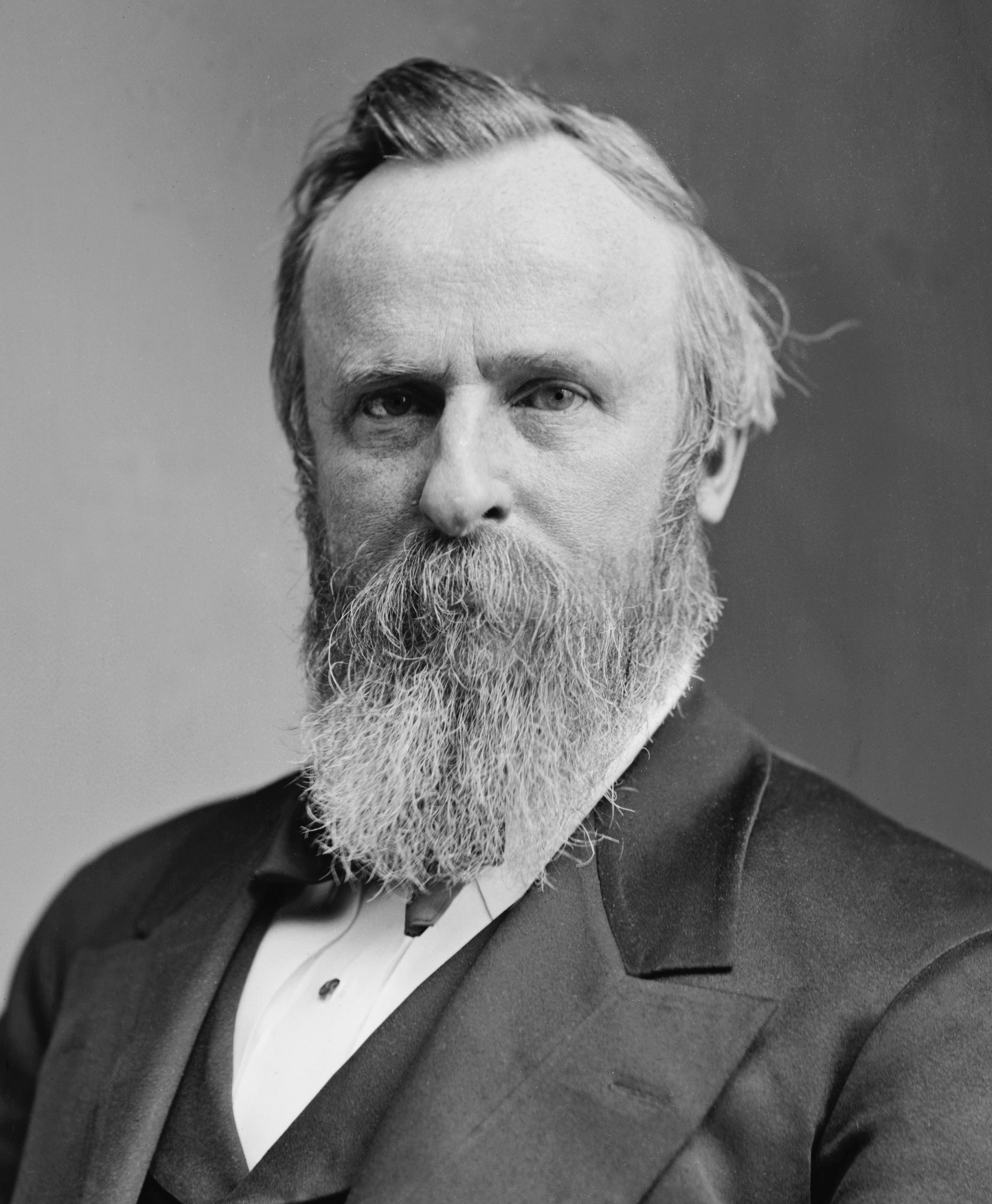

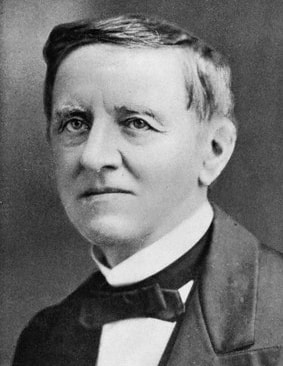
Nominee	Rutherford B. Hayes	Samuel J. Tilden
Party	Republican	Democratic
Home state	Ohio	New York
Running mate	William A. Wheeler	Thomas A. Hendricks
Electoral vote	3	0
Legislative vote	50	24
Percentage	67.57%	32.43%
President before election
Ulysses S. Grant
Republican
Elected President
Rutherford B. Hayes
Republican

The 1876 United States presidential election in Colorado took place on November 7, 1876, as part of the 1876 United States presidential election. The state legislature chose three representatives, or electors to the Electoral College, who voted for president and vice president, which would be the first and only time the state would do so.

Colorado voted in its first ever presidential election, having become the 38th state on August 1 of that year. The state cast three electoral votes for the Republican candidate Rutherford B. Hayes. These electors were chosen in a 50 to 24 vote by the Colorado General Assembly, the state legislature, rather than by popular vote, the last time in American history that a state's electors were chosen without a popular vote and one of only two (along with Florida in 1868) times after the American Civil War. This proved to be decisive as Hayes would win the electoral vote by a margin of one vote. Had Colorado not been a state in time for the 1876 election, Hayes would have lost the 1876 election to Democratic candidate Samuel J. Tilden.

== Results ==
1876 United States presidential election in Colorado
Party	Candidate	Legislative Vote	Percentage	Electoral votes
Republican	Rutherford B. Hayes	50	67.57%	3
Democratic	Samuel J. Tilden	24	32.43%	0
Total		74	100.00%	3

== See also ==
- United States presidential elections in Colorado
