= 1908 United States presidential election in Florida =

- November 3, 1908
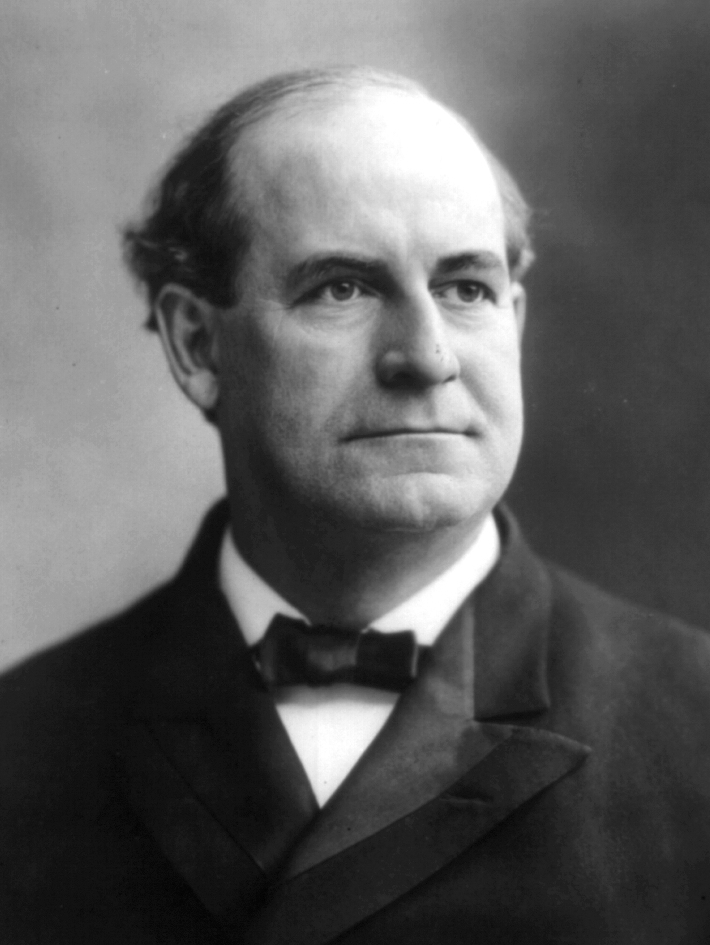

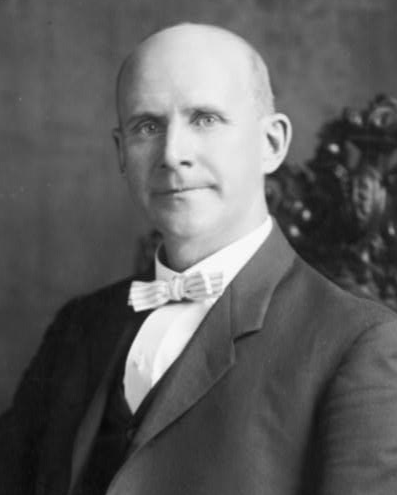
Nominee	William Jennings Bryan	William Howard Taft	Eugene V. Debs
Party	Democratic	Republican	Socialist
Home state	Nebraska	Ohio	Indiana
Running mate	John W. Kern	James S. Sherman	Ben Hanford
Electoral vote	5	0	0
Popular vote	31,104	10,654	3,747
Percentage	63.01%	21.58%	7.59%
County results
Bryan
40–50%
50–60%
60–70%
70–80%
80–90%
Taft
40–50%
President before election
Theodore Roosevelt
Republican
Elected President
William Howard Taft
Republican

The 1908 United States presidential election in Florida was held on November 3, 1908, as part of the 1908 United States presidential election. Voters chose five representatives, or electors to the Electoral College, who voted for president and vice-president.

With the disfranchisement of African-Americans by a poll tax in 1889, Florida became a one-party Democratic state, which it was to remain until the 1950s—apart from the anti-Catholic vote against Al Smith in 1928. Unlike Texas with its German settlements in the Edwards Plateau, or those Southern states that extended into the Appalachian Mountains or Ozarks, Florida completely lacked upland or German refugee whites opposed to secession. Thus, Florida's Republican Party between 1872 and 1888 was entirely dependent upon black votes, a fact graphically seen when one considers that—although very few blacks in the state had ever voted within the previous fifty-five years—at the time of the landmark court case of Smith v. Allwright (1944), half of Florida's registered Republicans were still black. Thus, disfranchisement of blacks and poor whites left Florida as devoid of Republican adherents as Louisiana, Mississippi or South Carolina.

Nevertheless, Florida's one-party Democratic rule was marginally interrupted in the 1900s by considerable Socialist and Populist growth, centered in Tampa and Jacksonville, and southern Lee County with its "Koreshan Unity" sect. Immigrants and farmers fearing loss of tenure had in 1904 given over ten percent of the vote in several counties of Central and South Florida to Eugene V. Debs―in the second of his five Presidential runs―and substantial votes in many pineywoods counties to Populist Thomas E. Watson.

Florida was won by the Democratic nominees, former Representative William Jennings Bryan of Nebraska and his running mate John W. Kern of Indiana. They defeated the Republican nominees, former Secretary of War William Howard Taft of Ohio and his running mate James S. Sherman of New York. Bryan won the state by a margin of 41.43%.

1908 saw several major strikes in the state, notably of railcars in Pensacola, and Debs was able to improve upon his 1904 vote to the extent of running second in five counties. However, Bryan still carried the state by a three-to-one margin over his nearest rival.

Bryan had previously won Florida twice against William McKinley in both 1896 and 1900.

== Results ==
1908 United States presidential election in Florida
Party	Candidate	Votes	Percentage	Electoral votes
Democrat	William Jennings Bryan	31,104	63.01%	5
Republican	William Howard Taft	10,654	21.58%	0
Socialist	Eugene V. Debs	3,747	7.59%	0
People's	Thomas E. Watson	1,946	3.94%	0
Prohibition	Eugene W. Chafin	1,356	2.75%	0
Independence	Thomas L. Hisgen	553	1.12%	0
Totals		49,360	100.00%	5

=== Results by county ===
	William Jennings Bryan Democratic		William Howard Taft Republican		Eugene Victor Debs Socialist		Thomas Edward Watson Populist		Eugene Wilder Chafin Prohibition		Thomas Hisgen Independence		Margin		Total votes cast
County	#	%	#	%	#	%	#	%	#	%	#	%	#	%	#
Alachua	1,239	61.03%	686	33.79%	25	1.23%	26	1.28%	38	1.87%	16	0.79%	553	27.24%	2,030
Baker	152	45.24%	104	30.95%	51	15.18%	11	3.27%	7	2.08%	11	3.27%	48	14.29%	336
Bradford	729	74.31%	180	18.35%	19	1.94%	13	1.33%	38	3.87%	2	0.20%	549	55.96%	981
Brevard	294	50.78%	225	38.86%	50	8.64%	7	1.21%	1	0.17%	2	0.35%	69	11.92%	579
Calhoun	241	35.23%	339	49.56%	12	1.75%	84	12.28%	2	0.29%	6	0.88%	-98	-14.33%	684
Citrus	371	83.56%	33	7.43%	26	5.86%	8	1.80%	6	1.35%	0	0.00%	338	76.13%	444
Clay	355	63.62%	122	21.86%	22	3.94%	18	3.23%	38	6.81%	3	0.54%	233	41.76%	558
Columbia	465	52.13%	279	31.28%	61	6.84%	54	6.05%	23	2.58%	10	1.12%	186	20.85%	892
Dade	961	60.59%	275	17.34%	160	10.09%	108	6.81%	53	3.34%	29	1.83%	686	43.25%	1,586
De Soto	992	69.03%	244	16.98%	112	7.79%	32	2.23%	44	3.06%	13	0.90%	748	52.05%	1,437
Duval	2,381	66.84%	641	18.00%	233	6.54%	155	4.35%	100	2.81%	52	1.46%	1,740	48.84%	3,562
Escambia	1,887	56.23%	718	21.39%	351	10.46%	245	7.30%	101	3.01%	54	1.61%	1,169	34.84%	3,356
Franklin	283	56.94%	112	22.54%	56	11.27%	30	6.04%	9	1.81%	7	1.41%	171	34.40%	497
Gadsden	563	76.29%	89	12.06%	34	4.61%	34	4.61%	12	1.63%	6	0.81%	474	64.23%	738
Hamilton	452	63.84%	116	16.38%	84	11.86%	33	4.66%	17	2.40%	6	0.85%	336	47.46%	708
Hernando	260	76.70%	57	16.81%	14	4.13%	5	1.47%	3	0.88%	0	0.00%	203	59.89%	339
Hillsborough	2,703	73.17%	367	9.94%	366	9.91%	69	1.87%	146	3.95%	43	1.16%	2,336	63.23%	3,694
Holmes	438	50.69%	337	39.00%	40	4.63%	32	3.70%	8	0.93%	9	1.04%	101	11.69%	864
Jackson	1,122	66.43%	353	20.90%	134	7.93%	55	3.26%	10	0.59%	15	0.89%	769	45.53%	1,689
Jefferson	565	71.34%	149	18.81%	23	2.90%	30	3.79%	21	2.65%	4	0.51%	416	52.53%	792
Lafayette	487	75.50%	90	13.95%	15	2.33%	8	1.24%	44	6.82%	1	0.16%	397	61.55%	645
Lake	487	58.46%	200	24.01%	62	7.44%	33	3.96%	45	5.40%	6	0.72%	287	34.45%	833
Lee	266	49.91%	72	13.51%	109	20.45%	10	1.88%	74	13.88%	2	0.38%	157 (Note: In this county, where Debs ran second ahead of Taft, the margin given is Bryan vote total minus Debs vote total, and the percentage margin is Bryan percentage minus Debs percentage.)	29.46%	533
Leon	698	72.86%	143	14.93%	44	4.59%	39	4.07%	25	2.61%	9	0.94%	555	57.93%	958
Levy	411	59.14%	189	27.19%	64	9.21%	14	2.01%	11	1.58%	6	0.86%	222	31.95%	695
Liberty	176	64.47%	69	25.27%	11	4.03%	11	4.03%	4	1.47%	2	0.73%	107	39.20%	273
Madison	511	85.88%	32	5.38%	23	3.87%	19	3.19%	7	1.18%	3	0.50%	479	80.50%	595
Manatee	644	70.85%	93	10.23%	104	11.44%	36	3.96%	28	3.08%	4	0.44%	540	59.41%	909
Marion	1,352	61.85%	482	22.05%	120	5.49%	97	4.44%	116	5.31%	19	0.87%	870	39.80%	2,186
Monroe	630	54.03%	227	19.47%	239	20.50%	26	2.23%	31	2.66%	13	1.11%	391	33.53%	1,166
Nassau	466	75.04%	92	14.81%	20	3.22%	15	2.42%	16	2.58%	12	1.93%	374	60.23%	621
Orange	952	59.17%	485	30.14%	63	3.92%	63	3.92%	26	1.62%	20	1.24%	467	29.03%	1,609
Osceola	193	57.44%	81	24.11%	12	3.57%	47	13.99%	1	0.30%	2	0.60%	112	33.33%	336
Pasco	436	76.49%	81	14.21%	21	3.68%	17	2.98%	15	2.63%	0	0.00%	355	62.28%	570
Polk	1,251	69.62%	290	16.14%	154	8.57%	54	3.01%	41	2.28%	7	0.39%	961	53.48%	1,797
Putnam	797	54.22%	454	30.88%	105	7.14%	57	3.88%	32	2.18%	25	1.70%	343	23.34%	1,470
St. Johns	758	56.07%	344	25.44%	35	3.02%	6	0.52%	10	0.86%	5	0.43%	414	30.63%	1,158
St. Lucie	280	64.52%	63	14.52%	146	24.62%	49	8.26%	32	5.40%	23	3.88%	134	39.90%	593
Santa Rosa	535	66.63%	212	26.40%	38	4.53%	14	1.67%	7	0.84%	32	3.82%	323	40.23%	838
Sumter	343	69.72%	62	12.60%	28	5.69%	35	7.11%	22	4.47%	2	0.41%	281	57.12%	492
Suwannee	597	56.70%	150	14.25%	220	20.89%	55	5.22%	19	1.80%	12	1.14%	377	35.81%	1,053
Taylor	250	48.64%	160	31.13%	41	7.98%	48	9.34%	12	2.33%	3	0.58%	90	17.51%	514
Volusia	736	58.18%	444	35.10%	41	3.24%	12	0.95%	28	2.21%	4	0.32%	292	23.08%	1,265
Wakulla	239	69.48%	56	16.28%	31	9.01%	11	3.20%	6	1.74%	1	0.29%	183	53.20%	344
Walton	504	51.85%	369	37.96%	46	4.73%	34	3.50%	13	1.34%	6	0.62%	135	13.89%	972
Washington	652	55.77%	288	24.64%	82	7.01%	87	7.44%	14	1.20%	46	3.93%	364	31.13%	1,169
Totals	31,104	63.01%	10,654	21.58%	3,747	7.59%	1,946	3.94%	1,356	2.75%	553	1.12%	20,450	41.43%	49,360

== See also ==
- United States presidential elections in Florida
