= 1888 United States presidential election in Florida =

- November 6, 1888
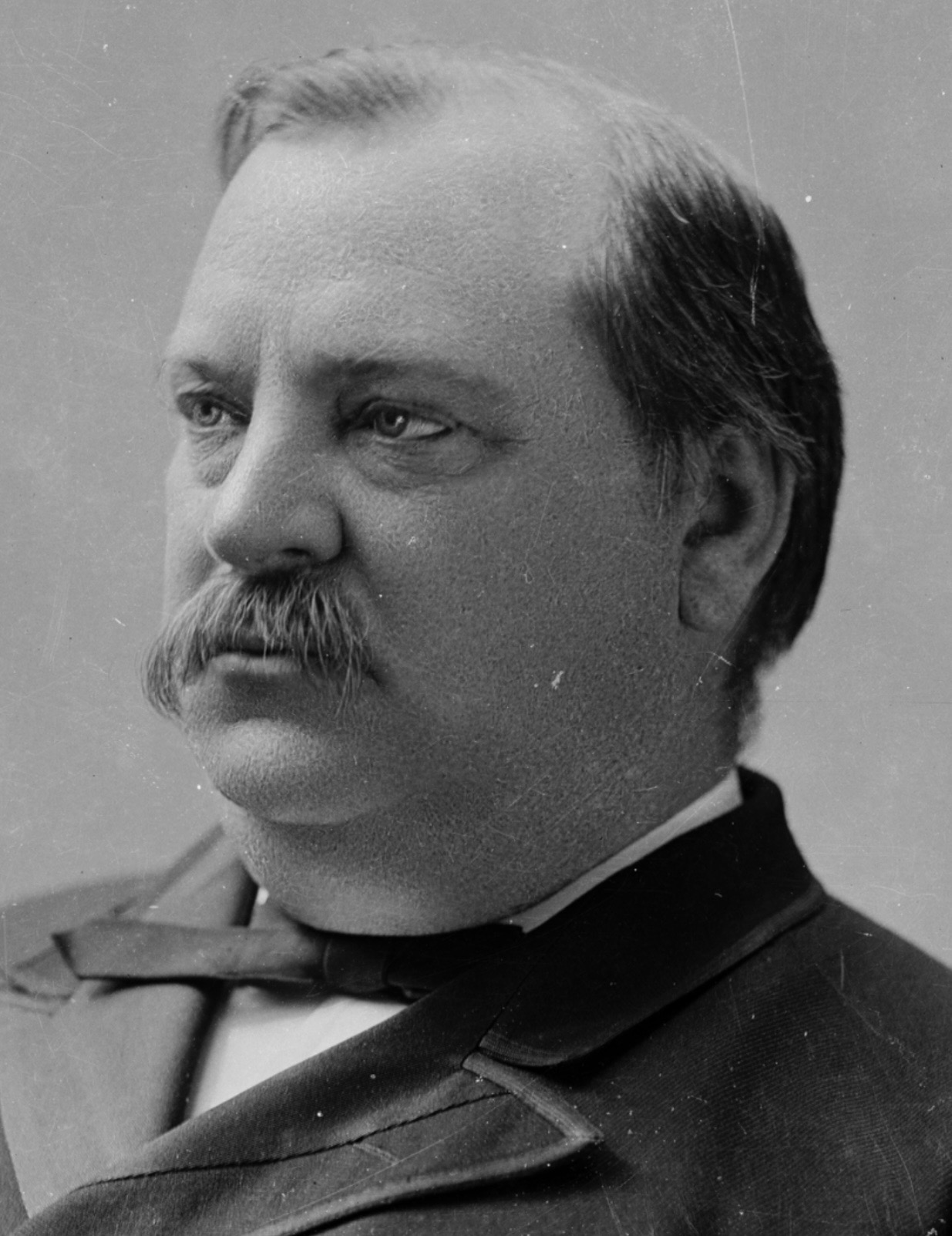

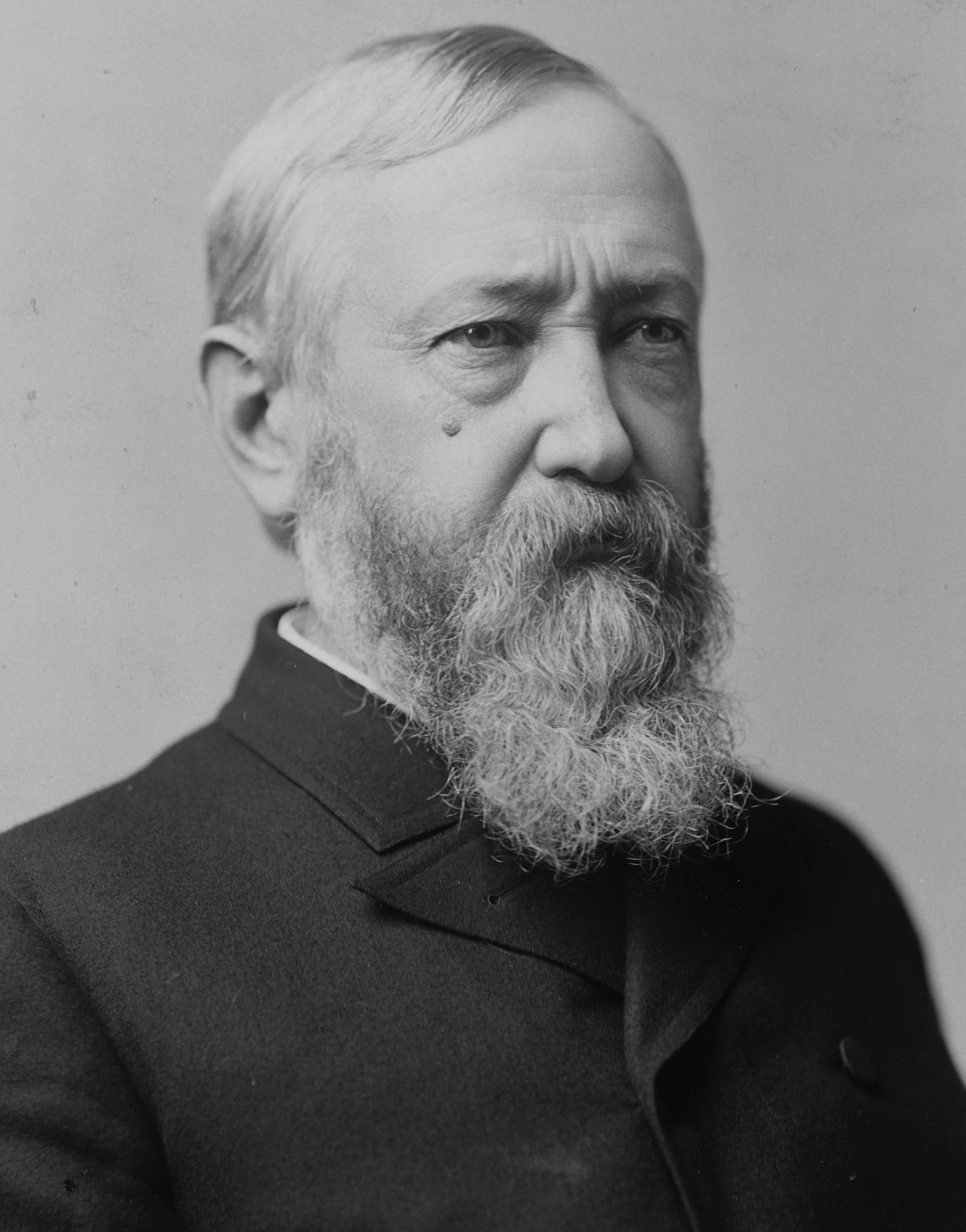
Nominee	Grover Cleveland	Benjamin Harrison
Party	Democratic	Republican
Home state	New York	Indiana
Running mate	Allen G. Thurman	Levi P. Morton
Electoral vote	4	0
Popular vote	39,557	26,529
Percentage	59.48%	39.89%
County results
Cleveland
50–60%
60–70%
70–80%
80–90%
90–100%
Harrison
50–60%
60–70%
President before election
Grover Cleveland
Democratic
Elected President
Benjamin Harrison
Republican

The 1888 United States presidential election in Florida took place on November 6, 1888. All contemporary 38 states were part of the 1888 United States presidential election. Florida voters chose four electors to the Electoral College, which selected the president and vice president.

Florida was won by the Democratic nominees, incumbent President Grover Cleveland of New York and his running mate Allen G. Thurman of Ohio.

This was the last election until 2020 that Florida increased its margin to an incumbent who lost re-election nationally.

This was also the only time Florida voted for a Democrat who won the popular vote but lost the presidential election. In 1876, 2000, and 2016, Florida voted for a Republican who lost the popular vote but won the Electoral College.

== Results ==
1888 United States presidential election in Florida
Party	Candidate	Votes	Percentage	Electoral votes
Democratic	Grover Cleveland (incumbent)	39,557	59.48%	4
Republican	Benjamin Harrison	26,529	39.89%	0
Prohibition	Clinton Fisk	414	0.62%	0
Totals		66,500	100.00%	4
Voter turnout				—

== See also ==
- United States presidential elections in Florida
