= List of county roads in Calhoun County, Florida =

- County road shields used in Florida

Highway names
- Interstates: Interstate X (I-X)
- US Highways: U.S. Highway X (US X)
- State: State Road X (SR X)
- County: County Road X (CR-X)

System links
- County roads in Florida; County roads in Calhoun County

The following is a list of county roads in Calhoun County, Florida. All county roads are maintained by the county in which they reside, although not all routes are marked with standard county road shields.

== County roads in Calhoun County ==
Route	Road Name(s)	From	To	Notes
CR 69		CR 275 in Marysville	SR 71 southwest of Blountstown	former SR 69
CR 69A		SR 69 north of Pine Island	Orlando Road at the Calhoun–Jackson county line northeast of Altha	former SR 69A
CR 73A	W. Oak Grove Road	SR 71 north of Wewahitchka	North of Wewahitchka	former SR 73A
CR 73A	Bates Road	CR 274 west of Chason	Bates Road northwest of Chason	former SR 73A
CR 73B		CR 73A north of Wewahitchka	Cypress Creek Boat Ramp north of Wewahitchka	former SR 73B
CR 73B		CR 73A (Bates Road) and NW White Pond Circle northwest of Chason	SR 73 in Willis	former SR 73B
CR 167		CR 167 and Longleaf Road / Copley Road at the Bay–Calhoun county line north-northeast of Fountain	CR 167 and Freeman Road at the Calhoun–Jackson county line northeast of Fountain	former SR 167
CR 194	Macedonia Road	CR 69A and Flatwoods Road west of Selman	SR 69 in Selman	former SR 194
CR 274	Chipola Street; Broad Street	CR 167 and Betts Road north-northeast of Fountain	SR 69 / CR 286 west-southwest of Ocheesee Landing	former SR 274; unsigned concurrency with SR 71 in Altha
CR 275	C.D. Clark Road	Marysville School Road south of Marysville	SR 71 south of Altha	former SR 275; unsigned concurrency with SR 71 northwest of Marysville
CR 275		CR 274 east of Altha	CR 275 (Flamingo Road) at the Calhoun–Jackson county line north-northeast of Altha	former SR 275
CR 275A	N. Mount Olive Cemetery Road	SR 71 south-southeast of Cox	CR 275 and N. Amaziah Peacock Road northeast of Altha	
CR 275B		CR 275A (N. Mount Olive Cemetery Road) east-southeast of Cox	Dowling Road / Jessie Lane at the Calhoun–Jackson county line east-northeast of Cox	
CR 286	Blueberry Drive	SR 69 / CR 274 west-southwest of Ocheesee Landing	CR 286 (Blueberry Drive) and Ethel Reed Road at the Calhoun–Jackson county line north-northeast of Ocheesee Landing	former SR 286
CR 287	NW Whitewater Grade	SR 20 in Rollins Corner	CR 274 west-southwest of Chason	former SR 287; portion north of CR 287A, northwest of Clarksville, indicated on FDOT county map to be part of CR 287A, but is signed as part of CR 287.
CR 287A		SR 73 north-northwest of Clarksville	CR 274 west-southwest of Chason	former SR 287A; portion north of the CR 287 intersection, northwest of Clarksville, indicated on FDOT county map to be part of CR 287A, but is signed as part of CR 287.
CR 392		Charlie Skipper Road / CCC Road No. 12 in Broad Branch	SR 71 west-southwest of Marysville	former SR 392
CR 392B		CR 392 northeast of Kinard	SR 73 east-northeast of Kinard	former SR 392B
CR 549	John G. Bryant Road; Dr. MW Eldridge Road	SR 69 and Magnolia Street in Pine Island	CR 69A north of Pine Island	former SR 549
