= Florida State Road 73 =

State highway in Florida, United States

State Road 73
- SR 73 highlighted in red

Route information
- Maintained by FDOT
- Length: 49.833 mi (80.198 km)

Major junctions
- South end: SR 71 at Chipola Park
- SR 20 in Clarksville; US 90 in Marianna
- North end: US 231 near Cottondale

Location
- Country: United States
- State: Florida
- Counties: Calhoun, Jackson

Highway system
- Florida State Highway System; Interstate; US; State; Former; Pre‑1945; Toll; Scenic
← SR 72	→ I-75

State Road 73 (SR 73), the Wayne Mixson State Highway, is a state highway in northwest Florida that runs through Calhoun and Jackson Counties, although it runs through more of the former county than the latter one. The road is always on the west side of the Chipola River, and is almost entirely two-lanes wide, except with its concurrency with US 90 in Marianna where it is four-lanes wide. It was named in honor of former Florida governor Wayne Mixson.

== Route description ==
=== Calhoun County ===
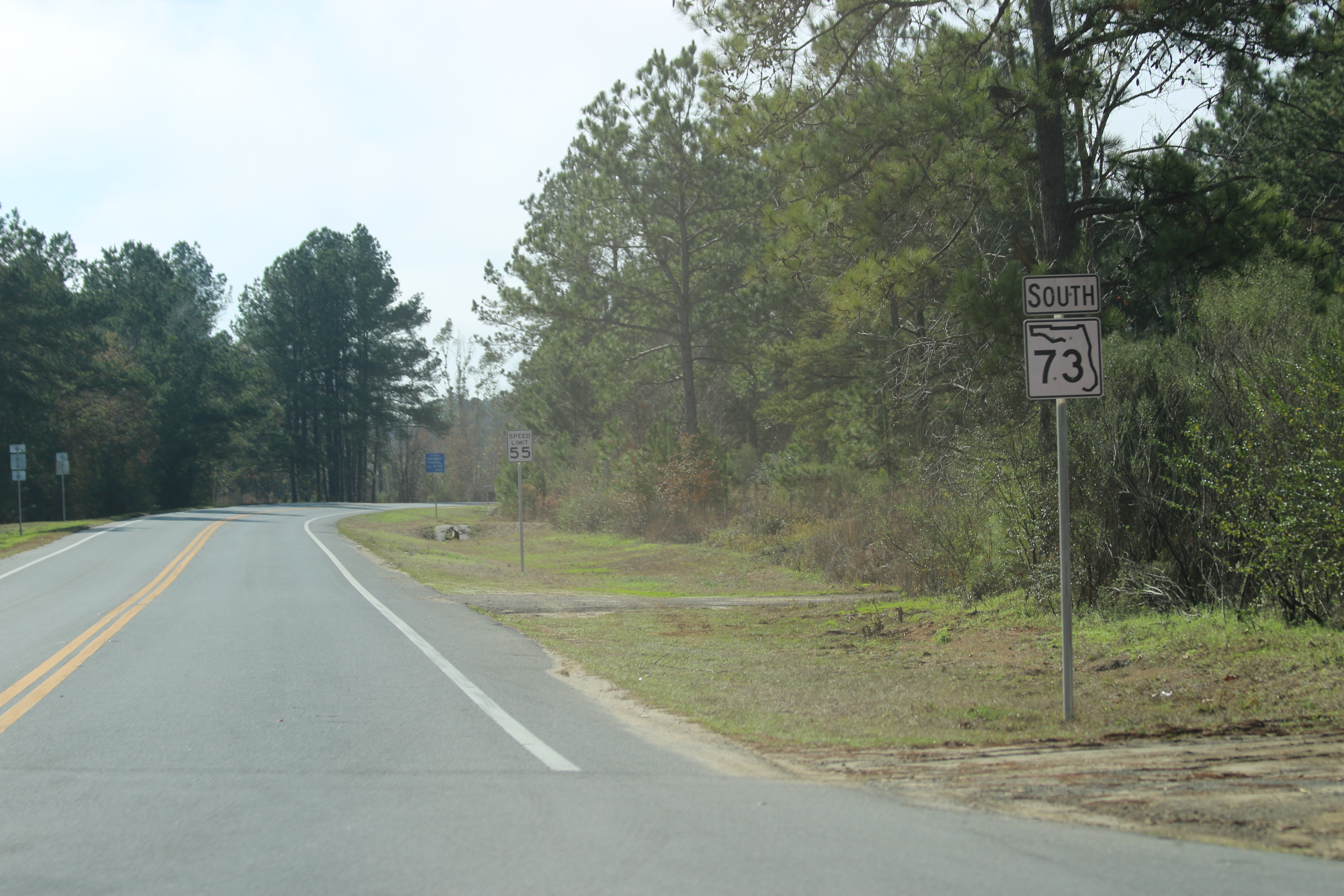
Looking south at Florida State Road 73 in Clarksville at SR 20

State Road 73 begins at State Road 71 in Chipola Park, near Kinard. It runs west from SR 71 almost without any acknowledgement, then shortly turns northwest before the intersection with County Road 73A. In Kinard itself, the road takes a sharp turn more toward the north, and crosses a bridge over Cypress Creek before approaching a blinker-light intersection with CR 392. North of there it encounters the eastern terminus of CR 392B, and tales a slight curve to the northeast. The road turns back toward the north as it winds through barren communities such as Frink where it crosses a bridge over Juniper Creek, and then Fisher Corner, only to curve back to the northeast again.

As the road gets closer to Clarksville, it curves straight north at the intersection of Dermont Road, and then seems to terminate, but in fact turns right in a short concurrency with State Road 20 which also contains a blinker-lights at both ends, the second of which is also the north end of Dermont Road. North of that concurrency, it resumes the previous northeast trajectory to turn straight north again, and then to the northwest as it passes by the west side of Clarksville Executive Airport, and then intersects Calhound CR 287A, and then turns straight north again at the intersection of Duck Pond Road. After the bridge over Tenmile Creek, the road enters Chason where it curves to the northeast as it passes by another private airport called "Cattle Creek Ranch Airport," and then intersects CR 274 at another blinker-light. North of there, the road only intersects local streets except for CR 73B in Willis. SR 73 begins to run much closer to the Chipola River as it approaches the Calhoun-Jackson County Line.

=== Jackson County ===
Before the road tries to move away from the river it intersects the eastern segment of CR 278 (Jewell Lane). State Road 73 curves to the northwest. It turns straight north again before approaching the western segment of CR 278 (Laramore Road), and then curves to the northeast to go over a bridge over both Dry Creek and Long Branch Creek. From this point it acquires the name Clarksville Highway and after passing the Lighthouse Community Churchmore turns straight north again at the intersection of Tupelo Court. The road passes by more local streets of equally minimal importance until it intersects CR 280, which is Thompson Road to the west and Magnolia Road to the east.

Despite the fact that it's a state road, SR 73 has no access to Interstate 10, which it crosses over with a two-lane bridge. After this the road becomes the terminus of CR 280A (Fillmore Drive), which is a suffixed alternate of CR 280 that was cut off by I-10 and instead terminates at Pelt Cemetery. Further north, it enters the City of Marianna where the road's name changes to Jefferson Street. Within the city, SR 73 makes a slight reverse curve to the right and then the left before it serves as what would appear to be the eastern terminus of CR 167 (South Street), and then crosses the CSX P&A Subdivision. In reality, CR 167 secretly joins SR 73 in a concurrency. At the equivalent of two blocks later, SR 73 becomes a two-lane divided highway just south of the intersection with Jackson Street where it enters the Marianna Historic District. A block later at U.S. Route 90(SR 10), SR 73 turns west as a concurrency begins along West Lafayette Street, but US 90 also has another concurrency with CR 164 which spans beyond the city limits along East Lafayette Street towards the west end of a concurrency with SR 71. Jefferson Street continues north as State Road 166 taking the concurrency with CR 167 with it as it runs towards Chipola College, Florida Caverns State Park, and Marianna Municipal Airport.

US 90/SR/73/CR 164 serves as the southern border of the Marianna Historic District until the road intersects Wynn Street. But historic sites can still be found beyond this point, among them a bed & breakfast next door to the 1840-built Ely-Criglar House, and later curves around the 1910-built Joseph W. Russ Jr. House which is also the county visitor center. Later it becomes the eastern terminus of former CR 10A (Old Cottondale Road), and old section of US 90. The last major intersection along this concurrency is the eastern terminus of State Road 276 (Pennsylvania Avenue), which continues north as Burpnose Road. The US 90/SR 73 concurrency ends at the southeast leg of a wye intersection with US 90 which turns to the southwest beneath a bridge under the CSX P&A Subdivision. SR 73 branches off to the northwest. The concurrency with CR 164 is unmarked but it ends at a dirt road named Lancer Road, which then leads to another dirt road named Lovewood Road. In the meantime, SR 73 continues to the northwest. which it maintains until it makes a slight northerly curve around swampland at the headwaters of Baker Creek. The only site of any significance after this is the shared intersection of Longwood Road and Union Road, and then a former segment of SR 73 branching off slightly to the right. State Road 73 finally ends at a blinker-light intersection with U.S. Route 231(SR 75) northeast of Cottondale, but not before intersecting the right-of-way to an abandoned segment of that road.

== Major intersections ==
County	Location	mi	km	Destinations	Notes
Calhoun	Chipola Park	0.000	0.000	SR 71 – Blountstown, Port St. Joe	
Calhoun	Kinard	4.300	6.920	CR 392	
Calhoun	Kinard	4.565	7.347	CR 392B west	
Calhoun	Clarksville	15.599	25.104	SR 20 west – Ebro	South end of SR 20 overlap
Calhoun	Clarksville	15.795	25.420	SR 20 east – Blountstown	North end of SR 20 overlap
Calhoun		18.116	29.155	CR 287 south	
Calhoun	Chason	23.013	37.036	CR 274	
Calhoun	Willis	24.244	39.017	CR 73B west	
Jackson		29.254	47.080	CR 278 east (Peacock Bridge Road)	
Jackson		34.965	56.271	CR 278 west (Laramore Road)	
Jackson		37.774	60.791	CR 280 east (Magnolia Road) / Thompson Road	
Jackson		39.322	63.283	CR 280A east (Fillmore Drive)	
Jackson	Marianna	40.821	65.695	CR 167 south (South Street)	
Jackson	Marianna	41.181	66.274	US 90 east (Lafayette Street / SR 10) / SR 166 north (Jefferson Street) – Grand Ridge, Florida Caverns State Park, Chipola College	South end of US 90 / SR 10 overlap
Jackson	Marianna	42.773	68.836	SR 276 west (Penn Avenue) to I-10	Eastern terminus of SR 276
Jackson	Marianna	43.192	69.511	US 90 west (SR 10) – Cottondale	North end of US 90 / SR 10 overlap
Jackson		49.833	80.198	US 231 (SR 75) – Cottondale, Campbellton	
1.000 mi = 1.609 km; 1.000 km = 0.621 mi: Concurrency terminus

== Related routes ==
State Road 73 has four suffixed alternate routes, all of which are county roads in Calhoun County.

=== County Road 73A ===
County Road 73A
- Location: Chipola Park (South); Chason (North)

North of the southern terminus of SR 73 is an east-west county road named Jesse Yon Road known as County Road 73A. It begins at SR 73 across a dirt road near power substation where it crosses SR 71 and continues to the east ending at the west bank of the Dead Lakes of the Chipola River.

The second CR 73A is located in Chason, and has no connection to its parent route. It also has non-standard county route shields, using a white square with black lettering rather than the MUTCD-standard blue pentagon with yellow lettering. It begins at CR 274 and runs relatively straight north and south terminating at Northwest White Pond Circle and CR 73B, where it becomes Bates Road.

=== County Road 73B ===
County Road 73B
- Location: Chipola Park(South); Willis (North)

County Road 73B is another one of two suffixed alternates of SR 73, the first of which is also located in Chipola Park. It begins at Jesse Yon Road(Southern CR 73A) east of SR 71 and though there are no shield, the road is specifically named "State Highway 73B" despite having lost its state designation. The road ends on the south bank of Cypress Creek in the Dead Lakes area.

The second CR 73B is located in and near Willis. It begins at the northern terminus of northern CR 73A as a continuation from Northwest White Pond Circle and runs east and west with one slight curve after Duck Pond then runs in a straight line only to turn to the southeast as it terminates at SR 73. Unlike the CR 73B in Chipola Park, it actually has a connection to State Road 73.
