= Florida State Road 166 =

State highway in Florida, United States

State Road 166
- Florida State Road 166 highlighted in red

Route information
- Maintained by FDOT
- Length: 5.054 mi (8.134 km)

Major junctions
- West end: US 90 / SR 73 in Marianna
- East end: SR 71 near Marianna

Location
- Country: United States
- State: Florida
- Counties: Jackson

Highway system
- Florida State Highway System; Interstate; US; State; Former; Pre‑1945; Toll; Scenic
← SR 162	→ SR 173

State Road 166 (SR 166) is a 5.054 miles (8.134 km) long state road in Jackson County, Florida, running from US 90/SR 73 in Marianna, Florida to SR 71. The road is almost entirely two lanes wide, except in portions where third center left turn lanes appear.

Despite ending in an even number, the road runs mostly north and south in and north of Marianna, Florida. While most of the road is signed as a north-south road, the northernmost portion is signed as an east-west road.

== Route description ==
State Road 166 begins as Jefferson Street at the southeastern terminus of the US 90/SR 73 concurrency, taking a secret concurrency with County Road 167 from SR 73. Two blocks north at Clinton Street the road runs between the city fire department and the First Presbyterian Church. At Davis Street, the route leaves the Marianna Historic District. Just north of there, the road begins to curve just to the northeast as it officially leaves the city at the intersection of Kelson Avenue, one side of which leads to Chipola College. Despite leaving the city, many businesses along this stretch of the road are still named for and addressed as being in Marianna. Taking a slight curve to the east the route approaches another road leading to Chipola College named River Forest Road, then the name changes from Jefferson Street to Caverns Road, which continues to make a more easterly curve as it approaches the bridge over the Chipola River. The easterly curve ends as the road returns to ground level from the embankment of the bridge.

The rest of the west side of the road is almost entirely forest land. At Meadowview Road, SR 166 runs along the bottom of a cut in hill, and then encounters an old section of the road as it descends into a lower area. The road returns to a slightly higher elevation after the intersection of Berkshire Road. Just north of there, the road runs along the eastern border of Florida Caverns State Park, which actually has two entrances. The first is to the Caverns Golf Course, and the next is the main entrance to the Caverns themselves. As SR 166 begins to curve east, CR 167 moves onto "Old U.S. Road," but Old US Road joins SR 166. Here the road ceases to be signed as a south-to north road and is signed as a west-to-east road. At Marianna High School, Old US Road turns south as a local road with no federal, state, or county designation whatsoever. The road then runs along the south side of Optimist Park, the headquarters of the Marianna City Parks and Recreation Department, and Marianna Federal Correctional Institution, which the Federal Bureau of Prisons's official website incorrectly states is off of County Road 167. The road between the two properties and one other further east leads to the back yard of the Marianna Municipal Airport. Between these two roads and on the opposite side of them is a cemetery called the Pinecrest Memorial Gardens. The latter of the roads to the back of the airport is the shared intersection of Russell Road and Old Greenwood Road. State Road 166 finally terminates at State Road 71, but continues east of SR 71 as Hartsfield Road, which is only paved for a power substation along SR 71.

== Major intersections ==
The entire route is in Jackson County.

Location	mi	km	Destinations	Notes
Marianna	0.000	0.000	US 90 / SR 73 (Lafayette Street / Jefferson Street / SR 10) – Grand Ridge, Cottondale	
			Yancey Bridge over the Chipola River	
	2.960	4.764	CR 167 north (Old U.S. Road)	
	5.054	8.134	SR 71	
1.000 mi = 1.609 km; 1.000 km = 0.621 mi
