= Washington Pope =

Florida reconstruction era American politician

Florida State Senate
- In office 1873–1876

Personal details
- Born: c. 1826 Florida, US
- Party: Republican

Washington Pope (born c. 1826) was an American farmer, county commissioner and state legislator who served in the Florida State Senate from 1873 until 1876.

== Biography ==
Pope was born in about 1826 in Florida and worked as a farmer.

He served as the Jackson County county commissioner from 1870 until 1873.

Pope served in the Florida State Senate representing the third senatorial district as a Republican for the 1873, 1874 and 1875 sessions.

== See also ==
- African American officeholders from the end of the Civil War until before 1900
