= Chipola, Florida =

Unincorporated community

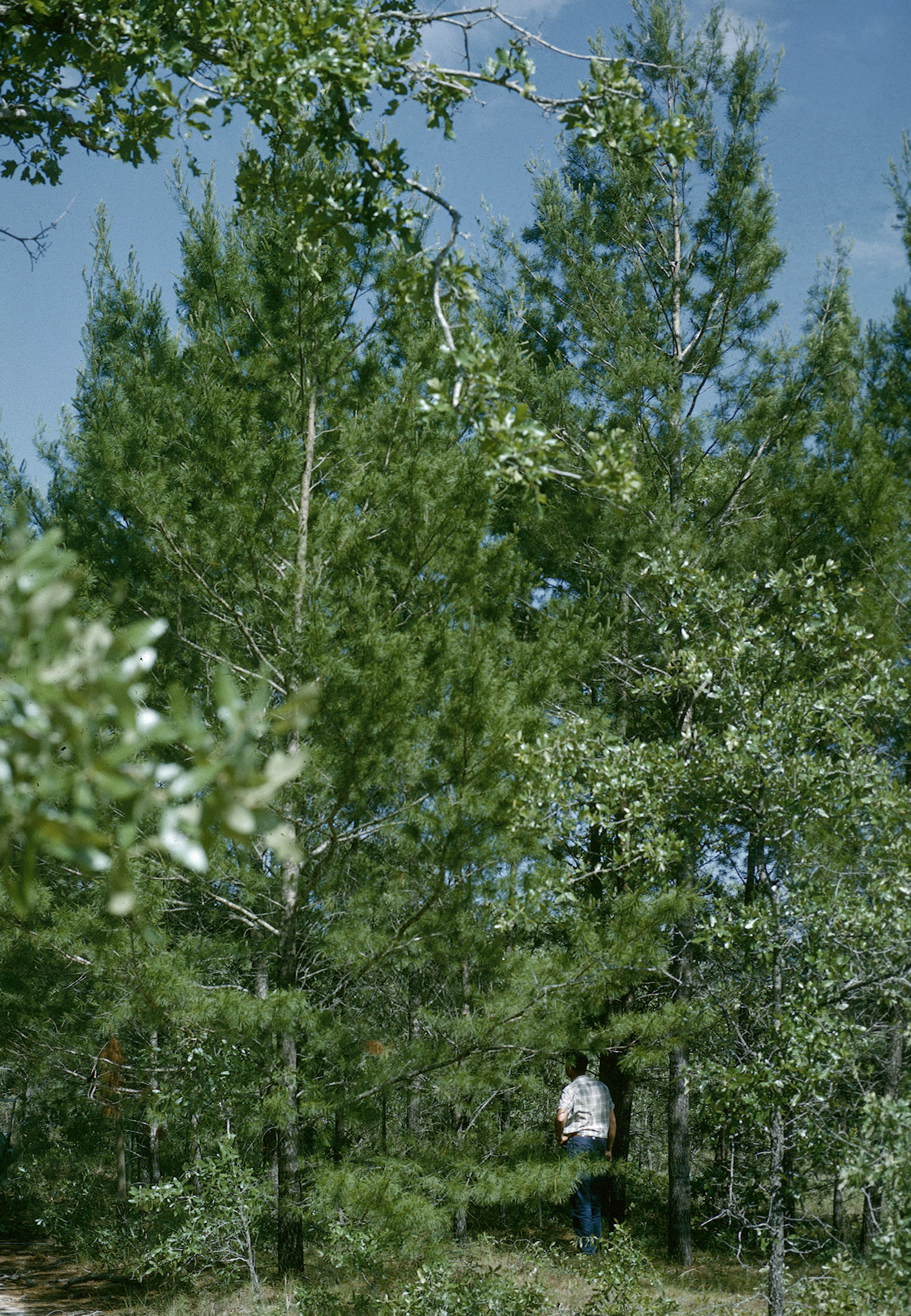
Sand pines (Pinus clausa) in Chipola, Florida.

Chipola is an unincorporated community in Calhoun County, Florida, United States.

== Geography ==
Chipola is on State Road 71, north of the Calhoun County Airport. It is located at 30°30′19″N 85°07′06″W.
