= Abe Springs, Florida =

Unincorporated community in Florida, U.S.

Coordinates: 30°21′57″N 85°08′51″W

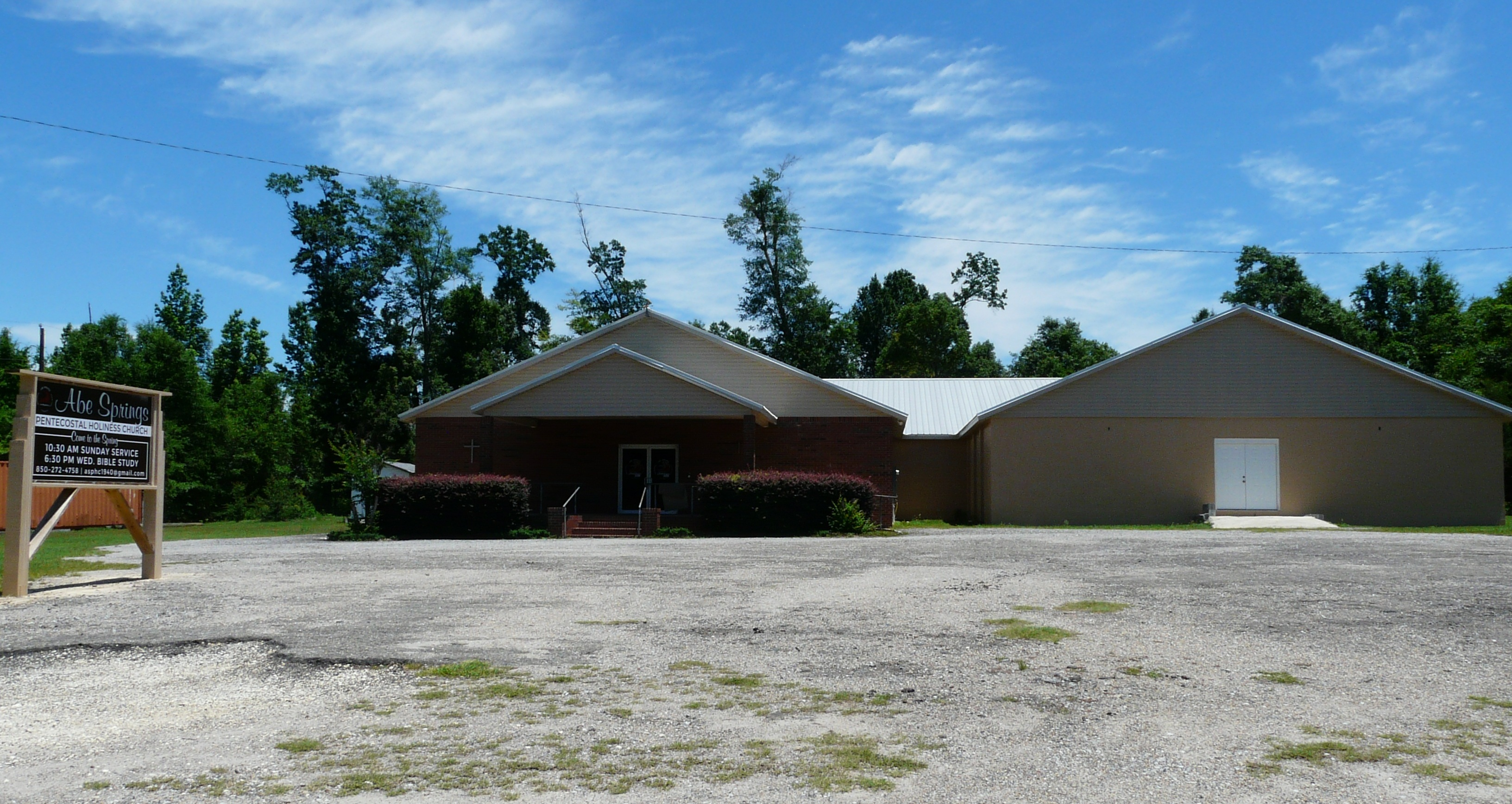
Abe Springs Pentecostal Holiness Church

Abe Springs is an unincorporated community in Calhoun County, Florida, United States. It is located along County Road 275 south of State Road 20 and northwest of State Road 71.
