= Frink, Florida =

Unincorporated community in Florida, U.S.

Frink is an unincorporated community in Calhoun County, Florida, United States. It is located on State Road 73.

== Geography ==
Frink is located at 30°22′06″N 85°12′51″W.
