= Ocheeseulga, Florida =

Unincorporated community in Calhoun County, Florida

Coordinates: 30°24′1″N 85°4′0″W

Ocheeseulga was an unincorporated community in Calhoun County, Florida, United States.
