= Chason, Florida =

Unincorporated community in Florida, U.S.

Coordinates: 30°32′07″N 85°11′31″W

Chason is a small unincorporated community in northwest Calhoun County, Florida, United States.

Chason is 65 miles west of Tallahassee, Florida, 53 miles south of Dothan, Alabama, and 44 miles northeast of Panama City, Florida. It is located along State Road 73 at the intersection of County Road 274 south of Willis.

Chason is located near the Chipola River and contains many ponds. The Florida Trail passes through Chason as it follows the course of CR 274 to the Altha trailhead, where it continues as a footpath through the Upper Chipola River Water Management Area. The surrounding countryside is notable as a large tract of Florida Scrub. Chason was directly in the path of Hurricane Michael in 2018, and many local assets sustained remarkable damage.
