= 1920 United States presidential election in Florida =

- November 2, 1920

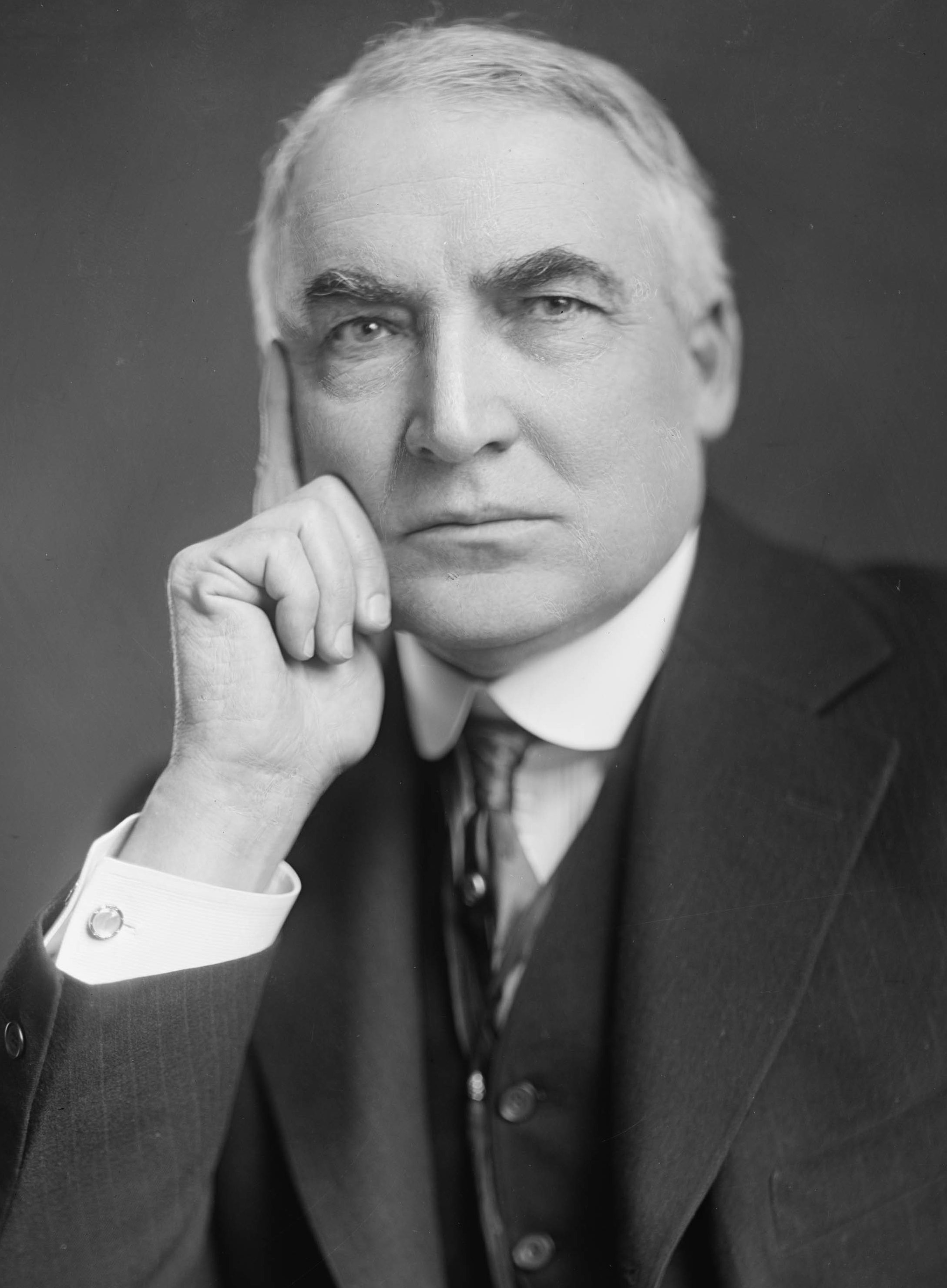
Nominee	James Cox	Warren Harding
Party	Democratic	Republican
Home state	Ohio	Ohio
Running mate	Franklin D. Roosevelt	Calvin Coolidge
Electoral vote	6	0
Popular vote	90,515	44,853
Percentage	62.13%	30.79%
County results
Cox
40–50%
50–60%
60–70%
70–80%
80–90%
90–100%
Harding
40–50%
50–60%
President before election
Woodrow Wilson
Democratic
Elected President
Warren Harding
Republican

The 1920 United States presidential election in Florida, was held on November 2, 1920. Voters chose six representatives, or electors to the Electoral College, who voted for the president and vice-president.

Ever since the disfranchisement of blacks at the beginning of the 1890s, Florida had been a one-party state ruled by the Democratic Party. The disfranchisement of blacks and poor whites by poll taxes in 1889 had left the Republican Party – between 1872 and 1888 dependent upon black votes – virtually extinct.

With the single exception of William Howard Taft's win in Calhoun County in 1908 the Democratic Party won every county in Florida in every presidential election from 1892 (Note: In the 1892 presidential election, Republican Benjamin Harrison was not on the ballot and the party backed Populist James B. Weaver.) until 1916. Only twice – and never for more than one term – did any Republican serve in either house of the state legislature between 1896 and 1928.

Despite this Democratic dominance and the restrictions on the franchise of the poorer classes due to the poll tax, significant socialist movements were to develop and persist in Tampa and to a lesser extent over other parts of the state, especially against the powerful Ku Klux Klan. In 1919, 4,800 miners led by the Mineral Workers Union would go on strike for seven and a half months in Polk County. The reason for the strike were that they wanted an eight-hour work day and a minimum wage of 37 cents. Governor Sidney J. Catts called on the Florida National Guard and the Polk County Home Guard to end the strike. At the end of the strike, five strikers would die.

Election day in Florida was marked with violence as the Ocoee massacre happened in Ocoee in Orange County. The massacre started after an African American man was rejected from his polling place by a white poll worker that he had not paid his poll tax. After being rejected he would try again which would lead to the massacre happening and it would be one of the worst incidents of political violence in the United States.

There was also a powerful Prohibitionist movement in older North Florida, which saw the Prohibition Party even win the governorship for one term under the notorious anti-Catholic minister Sidney J. Catts.

The 1920 election saw Harding make mild inroads into the absolute Democratic dominance of the state's politics, largely owing to considerable isolationist sentiment, and major economic concerns following the decline of industries related to World War I. He carried three counties in the south of the state, being only the second Republican to carry a Florida county since black disfranchisement, and begun tentative steps towards establishing a white GOP base in what was to become the "Sun Belt" after the development of air conditioning decades later. Eugene Debs, who had taken advantage of substantial radicalism in parts of South Florida to run second to Woodrow Wilson in the state in 1912, did not do nearly so well and was only marginally ahead of Prohibition candidate Watkins.

== Results ==
1920 United States presidential election in Florida
Party	Candidate	Running mate	Popular vote		Electoral vote	
Party	Candidate	Running mate	Count	%	Count	%
Democratic	James Cox of Ohio	Franklin Delano Roosevelt of New York	90,515	62.13%	6	100.00%
Republican	Warren Harding of Ohio	Calvin Coolidge of Massachusetts	44,853	30.79%	0	0.00%
Socialist	Eugene Debs of Indiana	Seymour Stedman of Illinois	5,189	3.56%	0	0.00%
Prohibition	Aaron Watkins of Ohio	David Colvin of New York	5,124	3.52%	0	0.00%
Total			145,684	100.00%	6	100.00%

=== Results by county ===
County	James Middleton Cox Democratic		Warren Gamaliel Harding (Note: Result of the fusion elector between regular Republicans and White Republicans. Highest Republican elector got 37,409 votes while highest White Republican elector got 10,118 votes.) Republican		Eugene Victor Debs Socialist		Aaron Sherman Watkins Prohibition		Margin		Total votes cast
County	#	%	#	%	#	%	#	%	#	%	Total votes cast
Alachua	3,310	72.52%	1,119	24.52%	112	2.45%	23	0.50%	2,191	48.00%	4,564
Baker	346	68.11%	115	22.64%	19	3.74%	28	5.51%	231	45.47%	508
Bay	818	54.90%	551	36.98%	71	4.77%	50	3.36%	267	17.92%	1,490
Bradford	1,269	78.82%	248	15.40%	8	0.50%	85	5.28%	1,021	63.42%	1,610
Brevard	894	53.31%	659	39.30%	63	3.76%	61	3.64%	235	14.01%	1,677
Broward	415	41.54%	442	44.24%	107	10.71%	35	3.50%	-27	-2.70%	999
Calhoun	861	78.42%	99	9.02%	20	1.82%	118	10.75%	743 (Note: In this county where Watkins ran second ahead of Harding, margin given is Cox vote minus Watkins vote and percentage margin Cox percentage minus Watkins percentage.)	67.67%	1,098
Citrus	651	82.61%	94	11.93%	25	3.17%	18	2.28%	557	70.68%	788
Clay	558	49.69%	486	43.28%	38	3.38%	41	3.65%	72	6.41%	1,123
Columbia	1,248	80.88%	162	10.50%	68	4.41%	65	4.21%	1,086	70.38%	1,543
Dade	4,288	53.08%	3,077	38.09%	375	4.64%	338	4.18%	1,211	14.99%	8,078
De Soto	2,496	64.93%	1,077	28.02%	197	5.12%	74	1.93%	1,419	36.91%	3,844
Duval	13,650	64.21%	6,628	31.18%	450	2.12%	529	2.49%	7,022	33.03%	21,257
Escambia	3,485	65.20%	1,227	22.96%	205	3.84%	428	8.01%	2,258	42.24%	5,345
Flagler	206	55.08%	74	19.79%	73	19.52%	21	5.61%	132	35.29%	374
Franklin	587	62.05%	276	29.18%	24	2.54%	59	6.24%	311	32.87%	946
Gadsden	1,922	96.68%	38	1.91%	18	0.91%	10	0.50%	1,884	94.77%	1,988
Hamilton	706	74.39%	151	15.91%	15	1.58%	77	8.11%	555	58.48%	949
Hernando	622	76.04%	132	16.14%	29	3.55%	35	4.28%	490	59.90%	818
Hillsborough	6,976	56.49%	3,772	30.54%	968	7.84%	633	5.13%	3,204	25.95%	12,349
Holmes	869	54.31%	537	33.56%	42	2.63%	152	9.50%	332	20.75%	1,600
Jackson	2,443	78.70%	508	16.37%	67	2.16%	86	2.77%	1,935	62.33%	3,104
Jefferson	754	72.08%	239	22.85%	19	1.82%	34	3.25%	515	49.23%	1,046
Lafayette	618	86.55%	69	9.66%	10	1.40%	17	2.38%	549	76.89%	714
Lake	1,720	67.72%	734	28.90%	52	2.05%	34	1.34%	986	38.82%	2,540
Lee	938	55.37%	626	36.95%	54	3.19%	76	4.49%	312	18.42%	1,694
Leon	1,412	71.75%	452	22.97%	58	2.95%	46	2.34%	960	48.78%	1,968
Levy	882	69.01%	377	29.50%	12	0.94%	7	0.55%	505	39.51%	1,278
Liberty	416	91.63%	5	1.10%	18	3.96%	15	3.30%	416 (Note: In this county where Debs ran second ahead of Harding, margin given is Cox vote minus Debs vote and percentage margin Cox percentage minus Debs percentage.)	87.67%	454
Madison	920	93.31%	30	3.04%	14	1.42%	22	2.23%	890	90.27%	986
Manatee	1,790	62.43%	884	30.83%	70	2.44%	123	4.29%	906	31.60%	2,867
Marion	2,436	62.43%	1,232	31.57%	82	2.10%	152	3.90%	1,204	30.86%	3,902
Monroe	979	56.04%	510	29.19%	149	8.53%	109	6.24%	469	26.85%	1,747
Nassau	900	72.12%	281	22.52%	22	1.76%	45	3.61%	619	49.60%	1,248
Okaloosa	568	56.63%	411	40.98%	20	1.99%	4	0.40%	157	15.65%	1,003
Okeechobee	237	65.11%	58	15.93%	28	7.69%	41	11.26%	179	49.18%	364
Orange	2,035	55.48%	1,447	39.45%	123	3.35%	63	1.72%	588	16.03%	3,668
Osceola	728	38.91%	1,035	55.32%	41	2.19%	67	3.58%	-307	-16.41%	1,871
Palm Beach	1,488	38.29%	1,892	48.69%	308	7.93%	198	5.10%	-404	-10.40%	3,886
Pasco	1,166	61.89%	630	33.44%	53	2.81%	35	1.86%	536	28.45%	1,884
Pinellas	2,848	48.94%	2,529	43.46%	202	3.47%	240	4.12%	319	5.48%	5,819
Polk	3,918	65.86%	1,782	29.95%	159	2.67%	90	1.51%	2,136	35.91%	5,949
Putnam	1,557	53.41%	1,181	40.51%	89	3.05%	88	3.02%	376	12.90%	2,915
Santa Rosa	813	70.51%	333	28.88%	2	0.17%	5	0.43%	480	41.63%	1,153
Seminole	1,485	62.50%	767	32.28%	73	3.07%	51	2.15%	718	30.22%	2,376
St. Johns	1,810	56.30%	1,221	37.98%	94	2.92%	90	2.80%	589	18.32%	3,215
St. Lucie	1,167	58.44%	707	35.40%	64	3.20%	59	2.95%	460	23.04%	1,997
Sumter	921	79.74%	219	18.96%	8	0.69%	7	0.61%	702	60.78%	1,155
Suwannee	1,486	72.56%	382	18.65%	111	5.42%	69	3.37%	1,104	53.91%	2,048
Taylor	563	77.98%	128	17.73%	8	1.11%	23	3.19%	435	60.25%	722
Volusia	2,763	52.47%	2,175	41.30%	126	2.39%	202	3.84%	588	11.17%	5,266
Wakulla	530	79.34%	119	17.81%	3	0.45%	16	2.40%	411	61.53%	668
Walton	1,297	64.24%	619	30.66%	36	1.78%	67	3.32%	678	33.58%	2,019
Washington	750	61.98%	307	25.37%	87	7.19%	66	5.45%	443	36.61%	1,210
Totals	90,515	62.13%	44,853	30.79%	5,189	3.56%	5,127	3.52%	45,662	31.34%	145,684
