= McNeal, Florida =

Unincorporated community in Florida, U.S.

Coordinates: 30.425728°N 85.032044°W

McNeal is an unincorporated community in Calhoun County, Florida, United States. It is located southeast of Blountstown on the northwest bank of the Apalachicola River, and is the eastern terminus of the Blountstown Greenway Bike Path, a rail-trail that was once part of the Marianna and Blountstown Railroad.
