= Eufala, Florida =

Unincorporated community in Florida, U.S.

Coordinates: 30°30′01″N 85°02′00″W

Eufala was an unincorporated community in Calhoun County, Florida, United States.
