= Jackson County Courthouse (Florida) =

Coordinates: 30.7735°N 85.2262°W

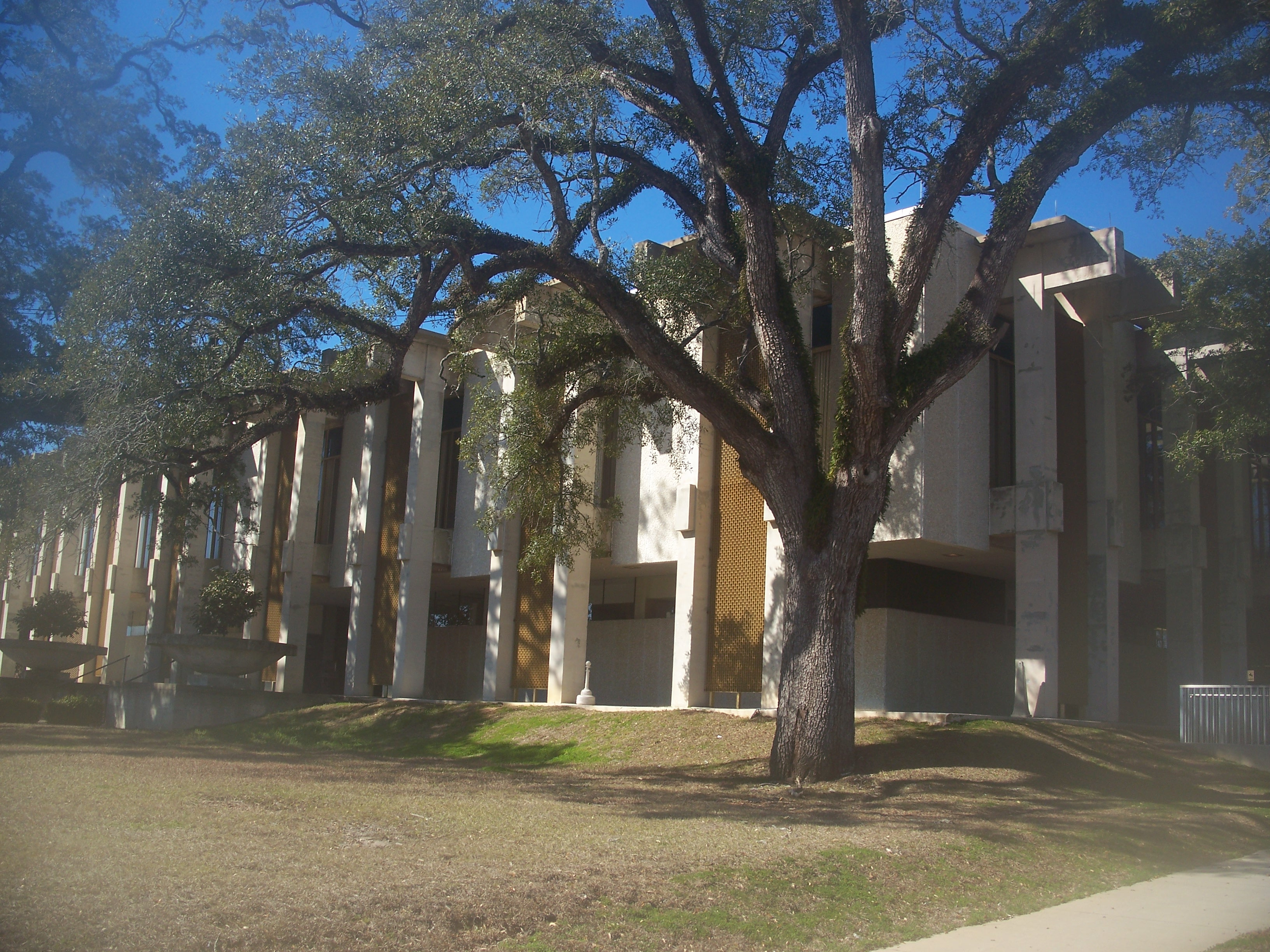
The Jackson County Courthouse in Marianna Florida.

The Jackson County Courthouse is a historic courthouse at the center of the Marianna town square, in Jackson County, Florida.

The first Jackson County Courthouse was built in 1829 when Scottish immigrant Robert Beveridge persuaded local authorities to designate the fledgling town of Marianna as the county seat with the promised construction of a courthouse. Eventually, a new courthouse was built in the town in 1906. On one occasion, it is reported that Florida Supreme Court Justice Rivers H. Buford prevented a mob of thousands of people from carrying out a lynching in Marianna in the fall of 1934, with nothing more than oratory delivered from the steps of the 1906 courthouse.

The current courthouse located at 4445 Lafayette Street in Marianna was built between May 1962 and December 1963, in a contemporary architectural style, a "three story rock and glass structure accented by four concrete planters" with a monument from the 1906 courthouse near the front entrance. The total cost was approximately $752,000. The building was described at the time as "unique in that there are no halls on the ground floor", with two courtrooms on the second floor "arranged so that the witness faces the jury when testifying".
