= Three Rivers State Park =

State park in Florida, United States

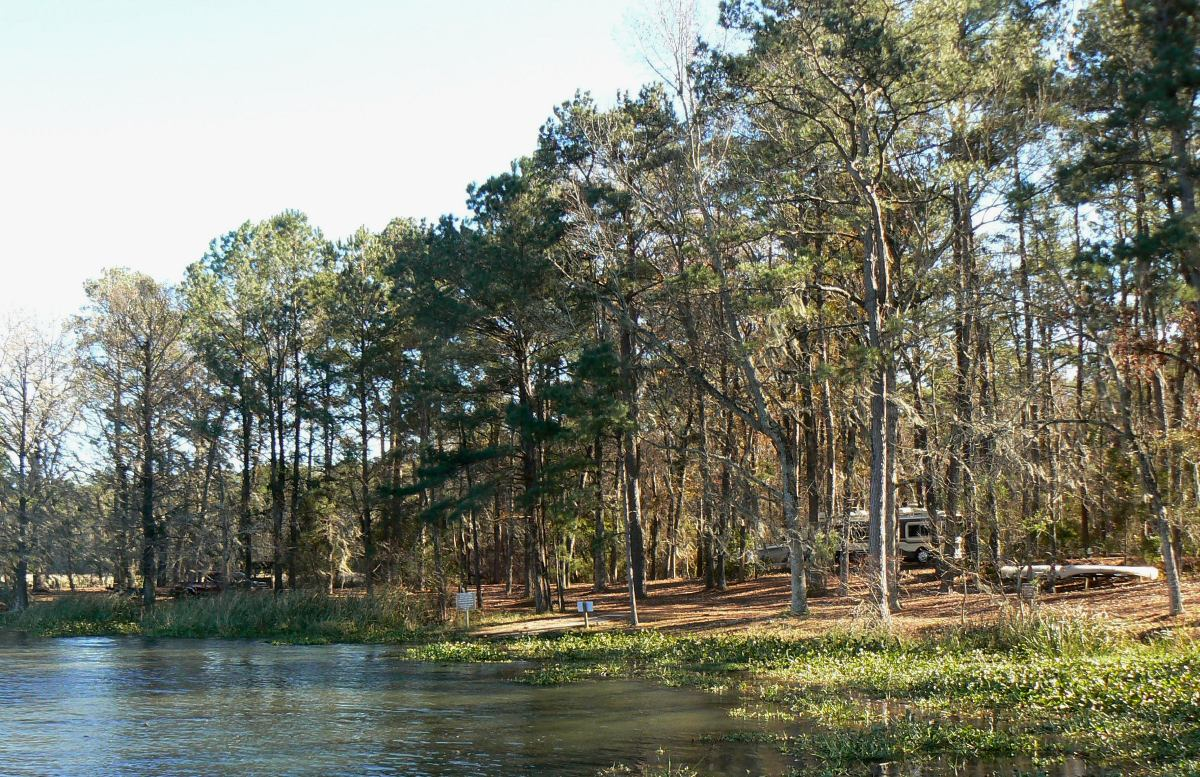
- Camping site along shore of Lake Seminole at Three Rivers State Park.

- Location within Florida Location within the United States
- Interactive map of Three Rivers State Park
- Location: Jackson County, Florida, United States
- Nearest city: Sneads, Florida
- Coordinates: 30.739836°N 84.934869°W
- Established: 1955
- Governing body: Florida Department of Environmental Protection

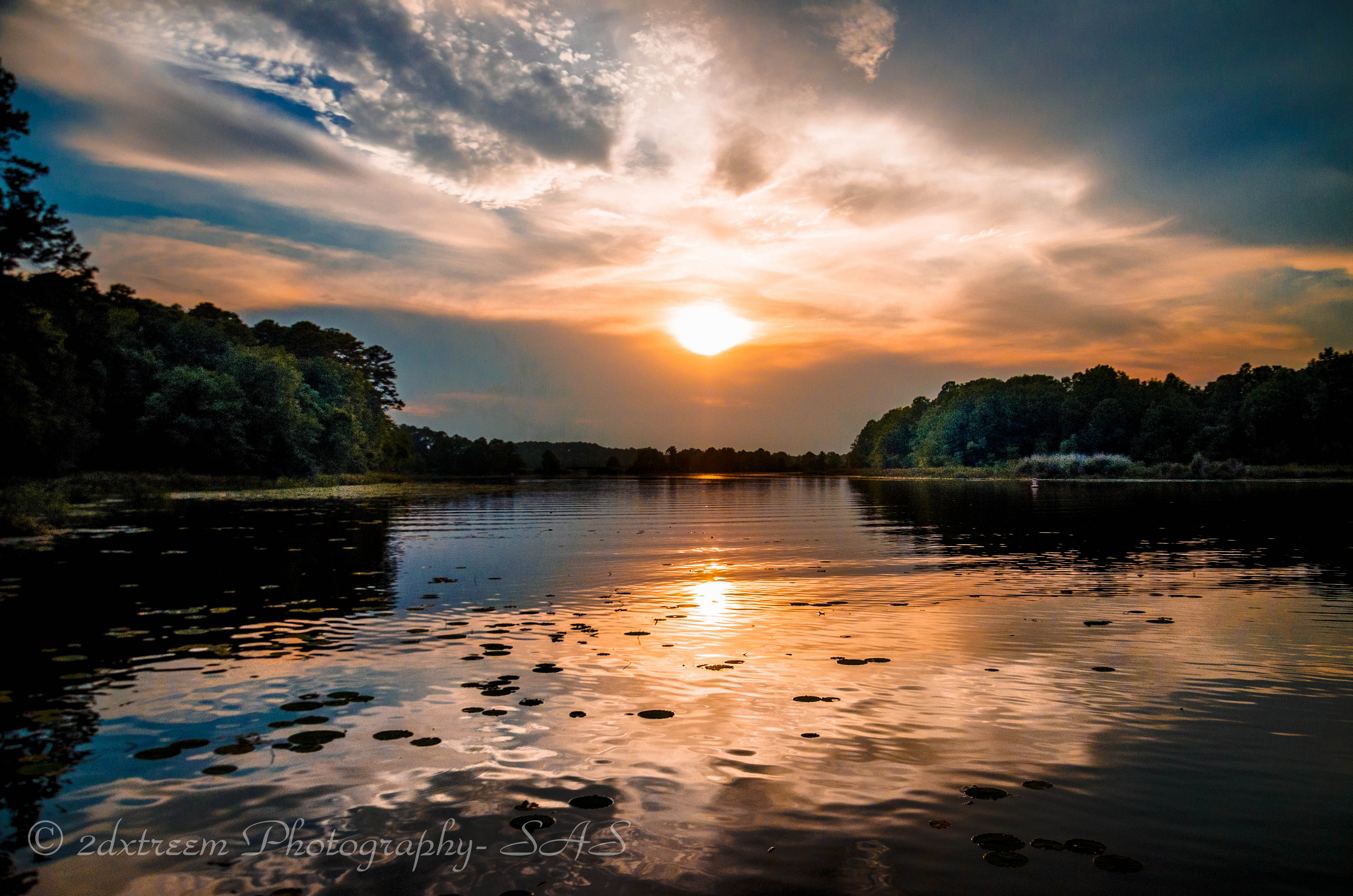
Sunset at Three Rivers State Park in Florida

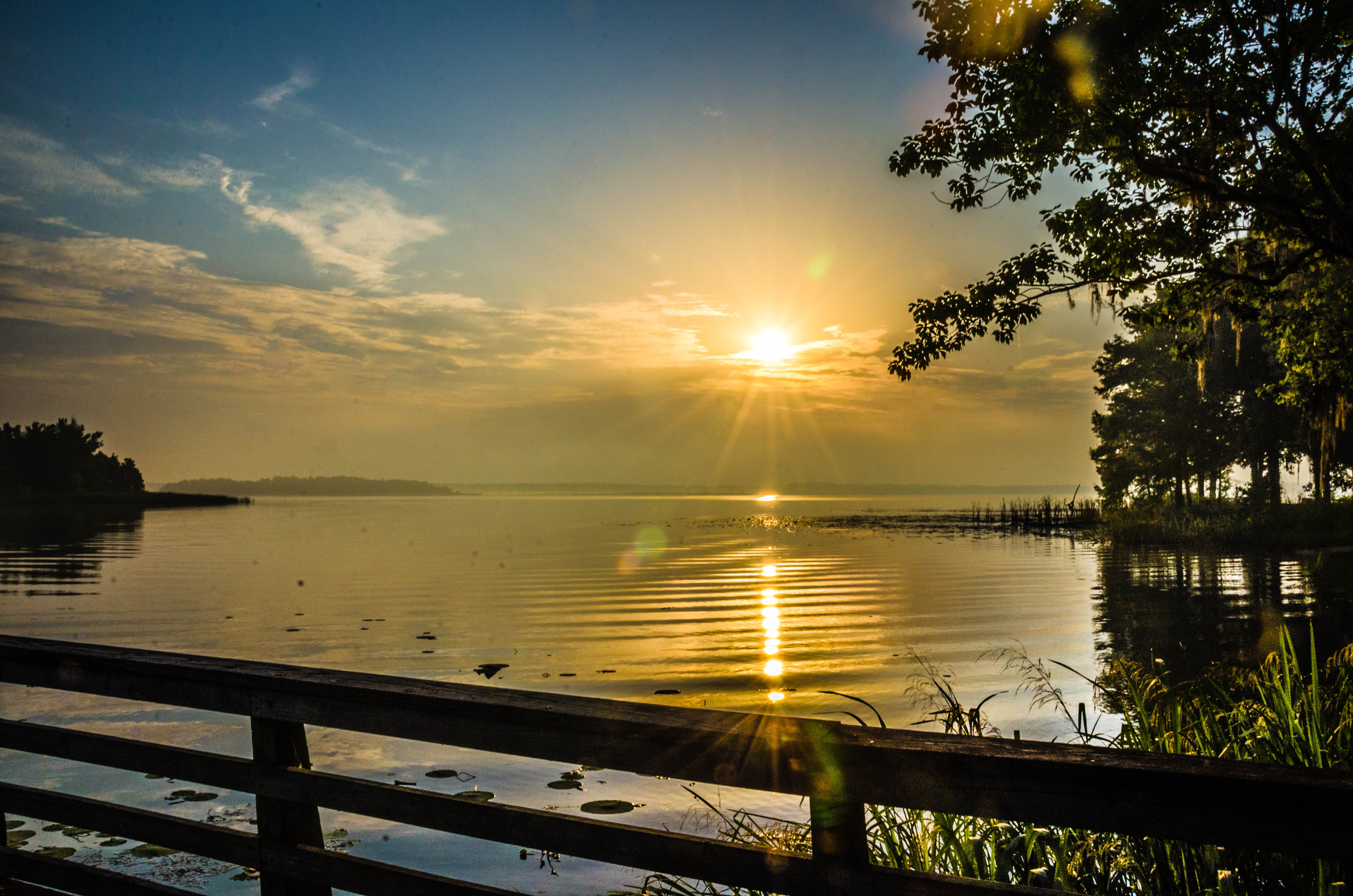
Sunrise at Three Rivers State Park in Florida

Three Rivers State Park is a Florida State Park located north of Sneads, on the shores of Lake Seminole near the Georgia border, in northwestern Florida. It is named for the main rivers associated with Lake Seminole: the Chattahoochee and the Flint (which flow into it from Georgia), and the Apalachicola (whose source is the lake itself.) The address is 7908 Three Rivers Park Road.

== Recreational Activities ==
The park has such amenities as boating, canoeing, fishing, hiking, kayaking, picnicking and full camping facilities.
