= Florida State Road 69 =

State highway in Florida, United States

State Road 69

Route information
- Maintained by FDOT
- Length: 35.226 mi (56.691 km)

Major junctions
- South end: SR 71 in Blountstown
- I-10 near Grand Ridge; US 90 in Grand Ridge
- North end: SR 71 / CR 162 in Greenwood

Location
- Country: United States
- State: Florida
- Counties: Calhoun, Jackson

Highway system
- Florida State Highway System; Interstate; US; State; Former; Pre‑1945; Toll; Scenic
← SR 68	→ SR 70

State Road 69 (SR 69) is a road running through Calhoun and Jackson counties in northwest Florida. The road is almost entirely two-lanes wide.

== Route description ==
State Road 69 begins at an unnamed connecting road between State Road 71 (North Main Street) and North Pear Street in Blountstown. After passing by the Blountstown Elementary School, a civic center and the intersection of Finlay Street, the route crosses a bridge over Simmons Creek and runs through Pine Island, where it intersects the southern terminus of CR 549 (John G. Bryant Road). North of there, it passes by the Nettle Ridge Cemetery and the church across from it, before crossing another bridge over a tributary of Simmons Creek where the route leaves Pine Island. The next moderate intersection is with CR 69A which branches off to the northwest and has its own intersection with CR 549 merely feet from the southern terminus. SR 69 curves to the northeast, passing over a low bridge over Stafford Creek and then some grass farms north of Parrish Lake Road. North of a bridge over Graves Creek, it enters Selman where it encounters the eastern terminus of CR 194. After the intersection of Jody Field Road the route turns straight north again, then approaches an intersection that serves as the twin termini of CRs 274 and 286. The road then curves towards the northwest as it passes beneath a power-line right-of-way, and then dips toward a low culvert over Flowers Creek. As it straightens out again it crosses the Calhoun-Jackson County Line.

The route continues to run primarily through forestland, although farmland exists north of the county line, then again north of Bone Yard Road, and again at a point where the road briefly curves to the northwest. Past the intersection with Raylene Road, the route turns more northerly again as it passes by a smaller parcel of private property lined with pine trees in the front yard. The first moderate intersection over the county line is another dual termini, this time of County Roads 278 & 69A, both of which are named Birchwood Road and apparently shared in a concurrency with County Road 280. From there it takes another curve to the northwest that's not as drastic as the previous one, only to turn back the northeast at the intersection of another dirt road. The road becomes a divided highway as it approaches Interstate 10 at Exit 152, and makes a slight curve back to the northwest, but even then remains two-lanes wide until north of the interchange where the approaches to the westbound off and on ramps transform it into a four lane highway, and even that segment ends north of Chips Drive before the divided section does. North of a dirt road leading to an antenna tower, it curves to the northeast, where it encounters a full intersection with a dirt road named Brushey Pond Road, then side roads such as Betty Road, an access road to a sewage treatment plant and Tobe Way. Somewhere north of a dirt road named Scarlet Road, SR 69 picks up the street name "Porter Avenue," and turns straight north. From there it encounters the northwestern terminus of County Road 69A (Shady Grove Road), which some maps show as being part of CR 280. Officially entering Grand Ridge SR 69's first intersection is with the Old Spanish Trail, which is also named Florida Street. Less than three and a half block later, it has a grade crossing with CSX's P&A Subdivision, Its time in Grand Ridge ends right after it passes the Town Hall across from the Grand Ridge Baptist Church. The road still remains two-lanes wide even as it approaches a blinker-light intersection with US 90, although it does contain separated turning ramps on the southeast and northwest corners of the intersection.

Beyond US 90 State Road 69 runs past some local and/or private dirt roads, as well as the local Grand Ridge Church of God. North of Shady Oak Lane, Porter Avenue becomes Porter Street, where it briefly runs through some forestland before approaching the temporary eastern terminus of County Road 164A (Reddoch Road), which has an unpaved and unmarked extension along Providence Church Road. Past that intersection, a power line right-of-way crosses the road and a substation on the northwest corner of that right of way marks the beginning of a series of power lines that follow the route. Farmland becomes much more prevalent north of this point. At a dirt road named Columbus Street, the name of State Road 69 changes from Porter Street to Spurlock Road, but after two other dirt roads State Road 69 curves northwest from Spurlock Road, which becomes a dirt road, and the route has no official name other than State Road 69. Around Dellwood the power lines that run along the road branch off to the right onto a former section of the road before the intersection of Bateau Pond Road, and then the route intersects Messer Road, just before the intersection of County Road 164 (Blue Springs Road/Sweet Pond Road), an unfinished county road that spans from southwestern Jackson County to Chattahoochee State Park in Alabama. North of the intersection of Northside Church Road, the power lines return to the street. After three more random intersections with dirt roads, the route enters the farming community of Two Egg just under where that previously mentioned power line branches off onto its own right-of-way, and after this the southern terminus of County Road 69A (Wintergreen Road) veers off to the right and State Road 69 adopts the name Fort Road. A block after this as the road turns more toward the west (although not entirely in that direction, Green Road mergers with SR 69. Between the parallel intersections with Joey and Peters Roads and Kimbell Road SR 69 finally runs straight west. Century Road is the next and last intersection along the road. Entering Greenwood, State Road 69 ends at State Road 71 but Fort Road becomes westbound County Road 162 as it heads for Jacob City, and Holmes County.

== Major intersections ==
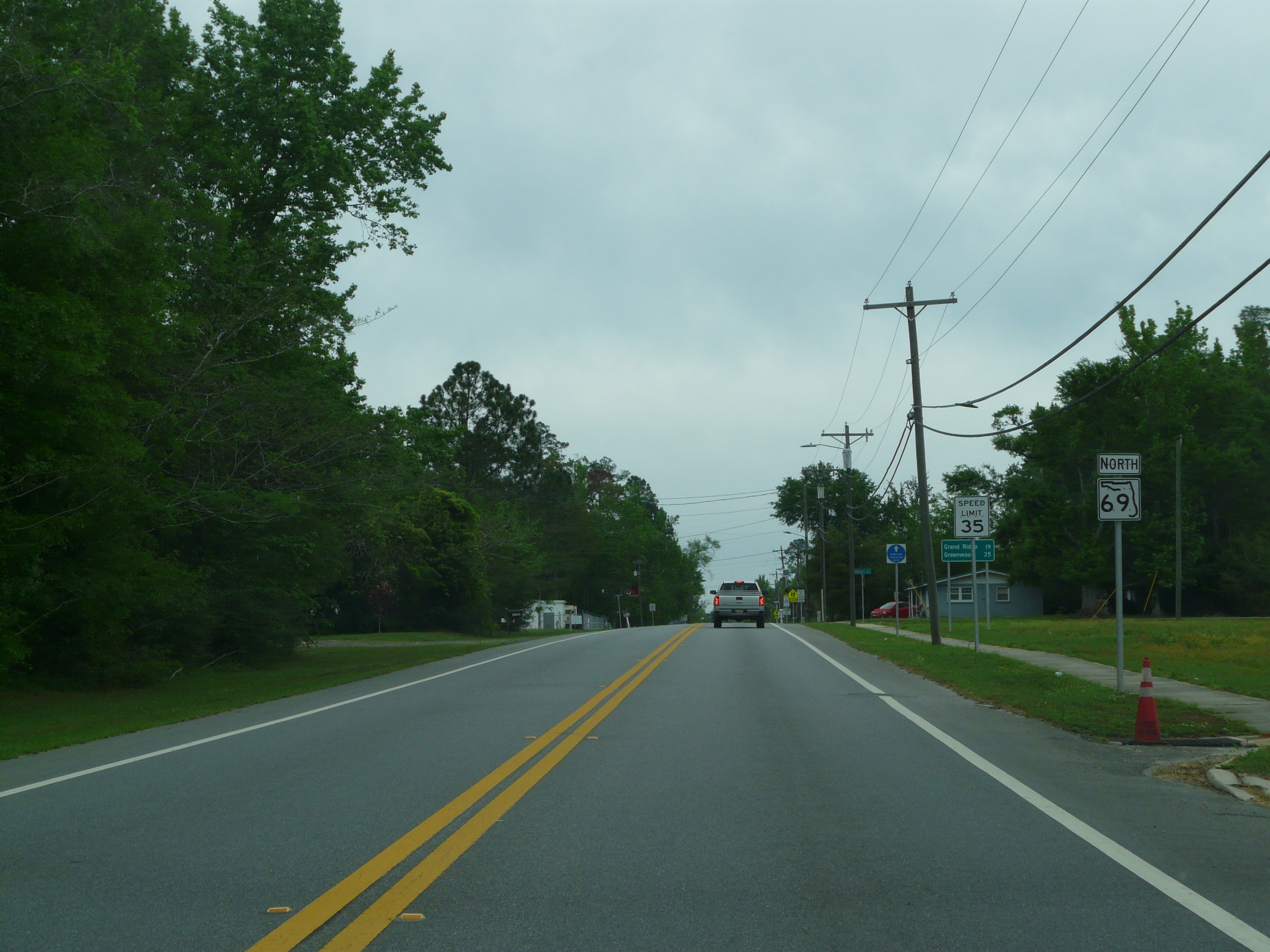
Northbound in Blountstown

County	Location	mi	km	Destinations	Notes
Calhoun	Blountstown	0.000	0.000	SR 71 (North Main Street)	
Calhoun	Pine Island	1.744	2.807	CR 549 north (John G. Bryant Road)	
Calhoun		3.005	4.836	CR 69A north	
Calhoun	Selman	5.924	9.534	CR 194 west (Macedonia Road)	
Calhoun	Ocheesee	8.981	14.454	CR 274 west / CR 286 east	
Jackson		13.889	22.352	CR 69A north / CR 278 west (Birchwood Road)	
Jackson		14.91	24.00	I-10 (SR 8) – Pensacola, Tallahassee	I-10 exit 152
Jackson	Grand Ridge	18.525	29.813	CR 69A south (Shady Grove Road)	
Jackson	Grand Ridge	19.589	31.525	US 90 (SR 10) – Marianna, Sneads	
Jackson		20.379	32.797	CR 164A west (Reddoch Road)	
Jackson	Dellwood	27.401	44.098	CR 164 west (Messer Road)	
Jackson	Two Egg	29.932	48.171	CR 69A north (Wintergreen Road)	
Jackson	Greenwood	35.226	56.691	SR 71 (Bryan Street) / CR 162 west (Fort Road) – Marianna, Malone	
1.000 mi = 1.609 km; 1.000 km = 0.621 mi

== Related routes ==
=== County Road 69 ===
County Road 69
- Location: Marysville-South of Blountstown

County Road 69 is a county extension route of SR 69. It runs from CR 275 in Marysville, through New Hope, past the Calhoun Correctional Institution, and ends at the intersection of SR 71 and Barfield Road, southwest of Blountstown.

=== County Road 69A (Calhoun County) ===
County Road 69A
- Location: North of Pine Island-Alliance

County Road 69A is a county suffixed alternate route of SR 69. It is paved until it approaches the County Line Airstrip, where it then becomes a dirt road named Orlando Road before crossing the Calhoun-Jackson County Line.

=== County Road 69A (Jackson County) ===
County Road 69A
- Location: Eastern Jackson County

County Road 69A is one of two county suffixed alternate routes of SR 69. The first one begins at SR 69 at the eastern terminus of CR 278, from which it acquires a concurrency with CR 280. The CR 69A/280 concurrency crosses a bridge over I-10 with no access and exists until the route reach Shady Grove, where CR 280 turns right, while CR 69A turns left. CR 69A winds toward the northwest until it returns to SR 69 south of Grand Ridge.

The second CR 69A begins at the State Road 69 as Wintergreen Road in Two Egg, then runs north until it turns east onto Lovedale Lane where it ends at County Road 164.

A third CR 69A which has no connection to SR 69 is described by Florida Department of Transportation maps as being Inwood Road, El Bethel Church Road, and Sandridge Church Road between McKeown Mill Road southeast of Grand Ridge and Welcome Church Road east of Dellwood. No other evidence of the route exists.
