= Look and Tremble =

Swimming hole, Chipola River, Florida, US

Coordinates: 30°31′29″N 85°9′41″W

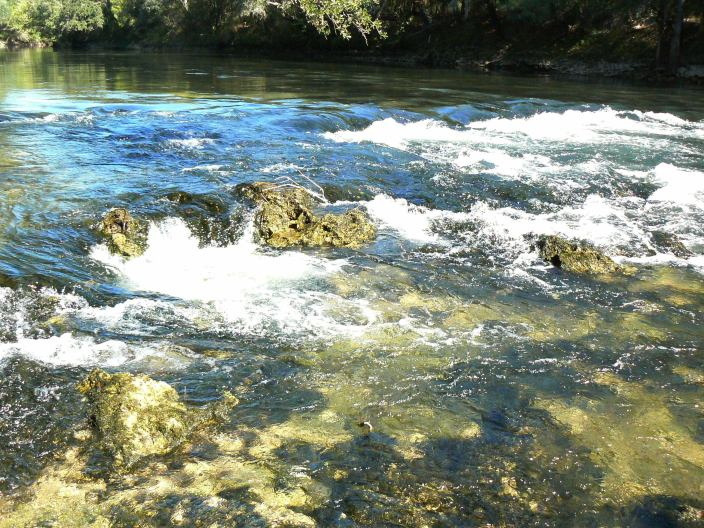
Look and Tremble in 2008.

Look and Tremble, sometimes known as Look and Tremble Shoals, or Look and Tremble Falls, is a shoal or rapids and swimming hole on the Chipola River in the United States state of Florida. It lies south of the County Road 274 crossing of the Chipola (Willis Bridge) west of Altha in Calhoun County. The county's Look and Tremble Park is adjacent to the shoals.

The Chipola River from the Florida Caverns State Park southward is a canoe trail. Look and Tremble is considered a class-one rapids (or "a mild class II on its best day".) This is the lowest in the International Scale of River Difficulty scheme, but any rating of the rapids is unusual for the generally flat landscape of Florida around the waterway. The relative placidity has resulted in Look and Tremble also being called "Glance and Giggle" by local area residents. The area is also popular for tubing and swimming. Holes in the limestone bottom of the river at Look and Tremble are repositories for American Indian artifacts and animal fossils that have washed downstream.

Look and Tremble is featured in the title of Jesse Earle Bowden's novel Look and Tremble: A Novel of West Florida (2000).
