= Broad Branch, Florida =

Unincorporated community in Florida, U.S.

Coordinates: 30°18′42″N 85°17′44″W

Broad Branch is an unincorporated community in Calhoun County, Florida, United States. The community is located at the west end of County Road 392, and is named for a tributary to Cypress Creek.
