= Calhoun County, Florida =

County in Florida, United States

- County
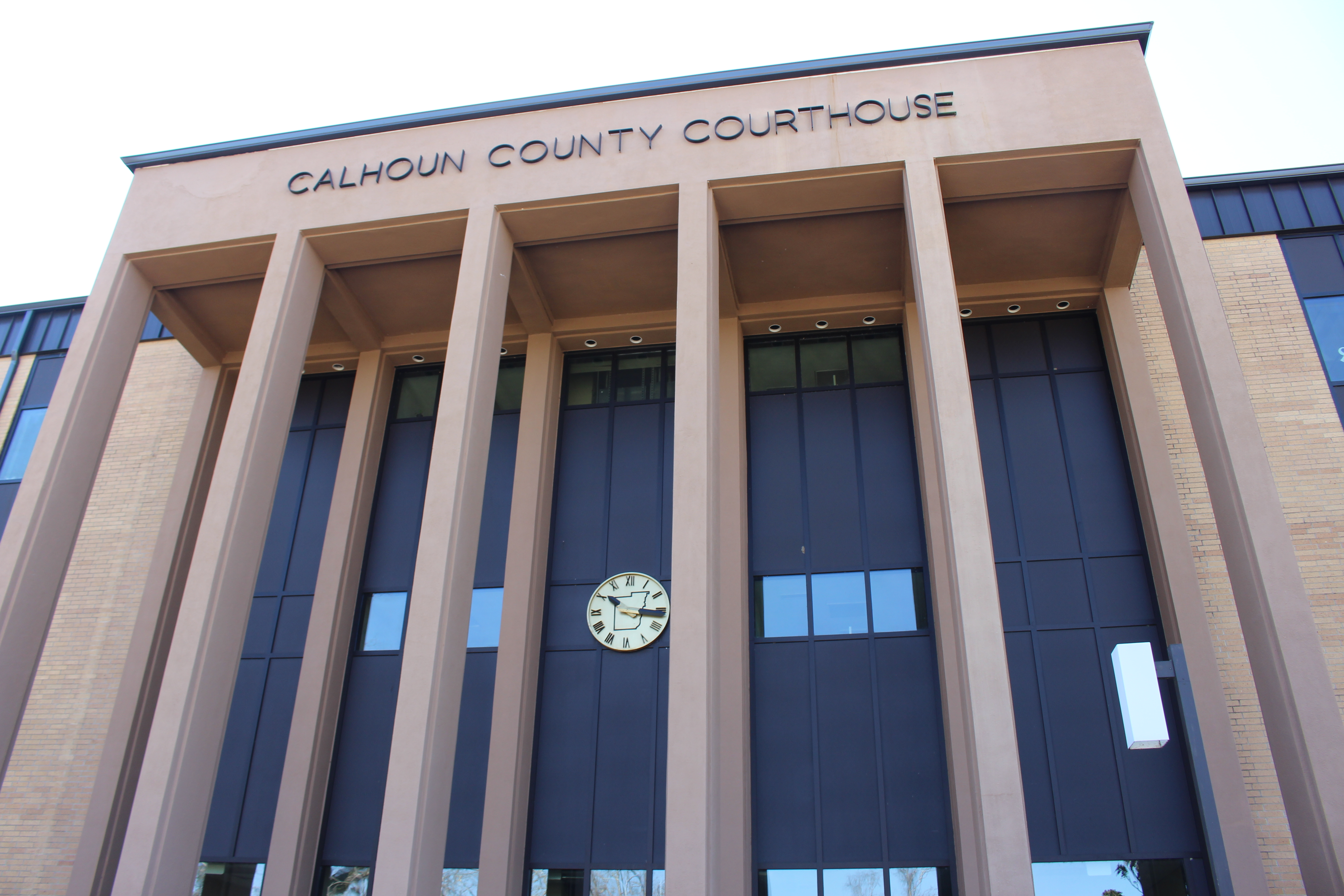
- Calhoun County Courthouse in Blountstown

- Location within the U.S. state of Florida
- Coordinates: 30°25′N 85°12′W
- Country: United States
- State: Florida
- Founded: January 26, 1838
- Named for: John C. Calhoun
- Seat: Blountstown
- Largest city: Blountstown

Area
  - Total: 574 sq mi (1,490 km^{2})
  - Land: 567 sq mi (1,470 km^{2})
  - Water: 7.0 sq mi (18 km^{2}) 1.22 %

Population (2020)
  - Total: 13,648
  - Estimate (2025): 13,289 ▼
  - Density: 24.1/sq mi (9.29/km^{2})
- Time zone: UTC−6 (Central)
  - Summer (DST): UTC−5 (CDT)
- Congressional district: 2nd
- Website: www.calhouncountyfl.gov

Calhoun County is a rural county located in the northern panhandle of the U.S. state of Florida. As of the 2020 census, the population was 13,648, making it the fifth-least populous county in Florida. Its county seat is Blountstown.

== History ==
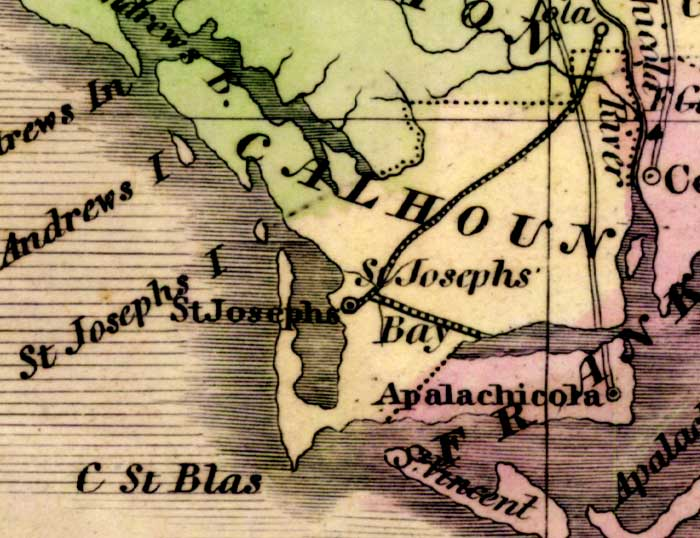
Map of Calhoun County, Florida, in 1842

Calhoun County was created in 1838. It was named for John C. Calhoun, member of the United States Senate from South Carolina and the seventh U.S. vice president, serving under John Quincy Adams and Andrew Jackson. The county was originally located between St. Joseph Bay and the Apalachicola River, with the county seat at St. Joseph (which was abandoned by 1844 due to a yellow fever epidemic and hurricanes).

In the late 1850s, there was a violent feud between the local Durden family and another anti-Durden group. This feud escalated and there was a breakdown of the law, with roaming gangs and a "pitched battle" at the courthouse square in Blountstown. The violence got so bad that the county judge had to call in aid from the Fifth Florida Militia Regiment, which deployed 150 militiamen to breakup the outlaw bands.

The relative lawlessness continued during the American Civil War when armed gangs gathered in the country side and avoided conscription by the Confederacy. These groups were in contact with and armed by the Federal blockade and even concocted a plan to kidnap the Confederate Governor Milton. Milton caught word of the plot and avoided capture.

The county was later expanded to the north with territory from Jackson and Washington counties. In 1913, part of Calhoun County was transferred to the new Bay County. In 1925, the southern part of Calhoun County was separated as the new Gulf County, which included the territory that had formed the original Calhoun County.

In 1930, a federal employee shot the County Sheriff over a dispute of unknown origin.

== Geography ==
According to the U.S. Census Bureau, the county has a total area of 574 square miles (1,490 km^{2}), of which 567 square miles (1,470 km^{2}) is land and 7.0 square miles (18 km^{2}) (1.2%) is water. The county is bounded on the east by the Apalachicola River and is bisected by the Chipola River, site of Look and Tremble.

=== Unincorporated areas ===
Among the unincorporated settlements are Broad Branch, Chipola, Clarksville, Chason, Durham, Fisher Corner, Flowers Still, Henderson Mill, Kinard, Leonards, New Hope, Rollins Corner, Selman, Sharptown, Summerville, and Willis.

=== Adjacent counties ===
- Jackson County, Florida – north
- Gadsden County, Florida – northeast (EST)
- Liberty County, Florida – east (EST)
- Gulf County, Florida – south (southern part of the county is in the EST)
- Bay County, Florida – west

== Demographics ==
Historical population
Census	Pop.	Note	%±
1840	1,142		—
1850	1,377		20.6%
1860	1,446		5.0%
1870	998		−31.0%
1880	1,580		58.3%
1890	1,681		6.4%
1900	5,132		205.3%
1910	7,465		45.5%
1920	8,775		17.5%
1930	7,298		−16.8%
1940	8,218		12.6%
1950	7,922		−3.6%
1960	7,422		−6.3%
1970	7,624		2.7%
1980	9,294		21.9%
1990	11,011		18.5%
2000	13,017		18.2%
2010	14,625		12.4%
2020	13,648		−6.7%
2025 (est.)	13,289	▼	−2.6%
U.S. Decennial Census; 1790–1960 1900–1990; 1990–2000 2010–2015 2020

=== Racial and ethnic composition ===
A map of the racial demographics in Calhoun County, Florida by Census tract (2023) Legend: Non-Hispanic White 50–60% 70–80% 80–90% >90%

Calhoun County, Florida – Racial and ethnic composition Note: the US Census treats Hispanic/Latino as an ethnic category. This table excludes Latinos from the racial categories and assigns them to a separate category. Hispanics/Latinos may be of any race.
Race / Ethnicity (NH = Non-Hispanic)	Pop 1980	Pop 1990	Pop 2000	Pop 2010	Pop 2020	% 1980	% 1990	% 2000	% 2010	% 2020
White alone (NH)	8,037	9,094	10,105	11,357	10,490	86.48%	82.59%	77.63%	77.65%	76.86%
Black or African American alone (NH)	1,119	1,654	2,028	1,991	1,668	12.04%	15.02%	15.58%	13.61%	12.22%
Native American or Alaska Native alone (NH)	88	131	154	144	93	0.95%	1.19%	1.18%	0.98%	0.68%
Asian alone (NH)	5	13	69	71	46	0.05%	0.12%	0.53%	0.49%	0.34%
Native Hawaiian or Pacific Islander alone (NH)	x	x	5	8	0	x	x	0.04%	0.05%	0.00%
Other race alone (NH)	4	1	14	6	10	0.04%	0.01%	0.11%	0.04%	0.07%
Mixed race or Multiracial (NH)	x	x	150	293	719	x	x	1.15%	2.00%	5.27%
Hispanic or Latino (any race)	41	118	492	755	622	0.44%	1.07%	3.78%	5.16%	4.56%
Total	9,294	11,011	13,017	14,625	13,648	100.00%	100.00%	100.00%	100.00%	100.00%

=== 2020 census ===
As of the 2020 census, the county had a population of 13,648. The median age was 42.8 years. 20.0% of residents were under the age of 18 and 19.3% of residents were 65 years of age or older. For every 100 females there were 122.4 males, and for every 100 females age 18 and over there were 127.9 males age 18 and over.

The racial makeup of the county was 78.7% White, 12.3% Black or African American, 0.8% American Indian and Alaska Native, 0.3% Asian, <0.1% Native Hawaiian and Pacific Islander, 1.6% from some other race, and 6.2% from two or more races. Hispanic or Latino residents of any race comprised 4.6% of the population.

<0.1% of residents lived in urban areas, while 100.0% lived in rural areas.

There were 4,784 households in the county, of which 30.7% had children under the age of 18 living in them. Of all households, 46.1% were married-couple households, 20.9% were households with a male householder and no spouse or partner present, and 26.5% were households with a female householder and no spouse or partner present. About 28.0% of all households were made up of individuals and 14.1% had someone living alone who was 65 years of age or older.

There were 5,628 housing units, of which 15.0% were vacant. Among occupied housing units, 78.6% were owner-occupied and 21.4% were renter-occupied. The homeowner vacancy rate was 1.9% and the rental vacancy rate was 7.1%.

=== 2000 census ===
As of the 2000 census, there were 13,017 people, 4,468 households, and 3,132 families residing in the county.

The population density was 23 people per square mile (8.9 people/km^{2}). There were 5,250 housing units at an average density of 9 per square mile (3.5/km^{2}). The racial makeup of the county was 79.87% White, 15.79% Black or African American, 1.26% Native American, 0.53% Asian, 0.05% Pacific Islander, 1.04% from other races, and 1.45% from two or more races. 3.78% of the population were Hispanic or Latino of any race.

There were 4,468 households, out of which 32.50% had children under the age of 18 living with them, 52.30% were married couples living together, 13.50% had a female householder with no husband present, and 29.90% were non-families. 26.50% of all households were made up of individuals, and 12.40% had someone living alone who was 65 years of age or older. The average household size was 2.53 and the average family size was 3.02.

In the county, the population was spread out, with 23.20% under the age of 18, 9.00% from 18 to 24, 31.50% from 25 to 44, 22.30% from 45 to 64, and 14.00% who were 65 years of age or older. The median age was 36 years. For every 100 females there were 117.20 males. For every 100 females age 18 and over, there were 120.80 males.

The median income for a household in the county was $26,575, and the median income for a family was $32,848. Males had a median income of $26,681 versus $21,176 for females. The per capita income for the county was $12,379. About 14.80% of families and 20.00% of the population were below the poverty line, including 23.60% of those under age 18 and 20.40% of those age 65 or over.

== Transportation ==
=== Major roads ===
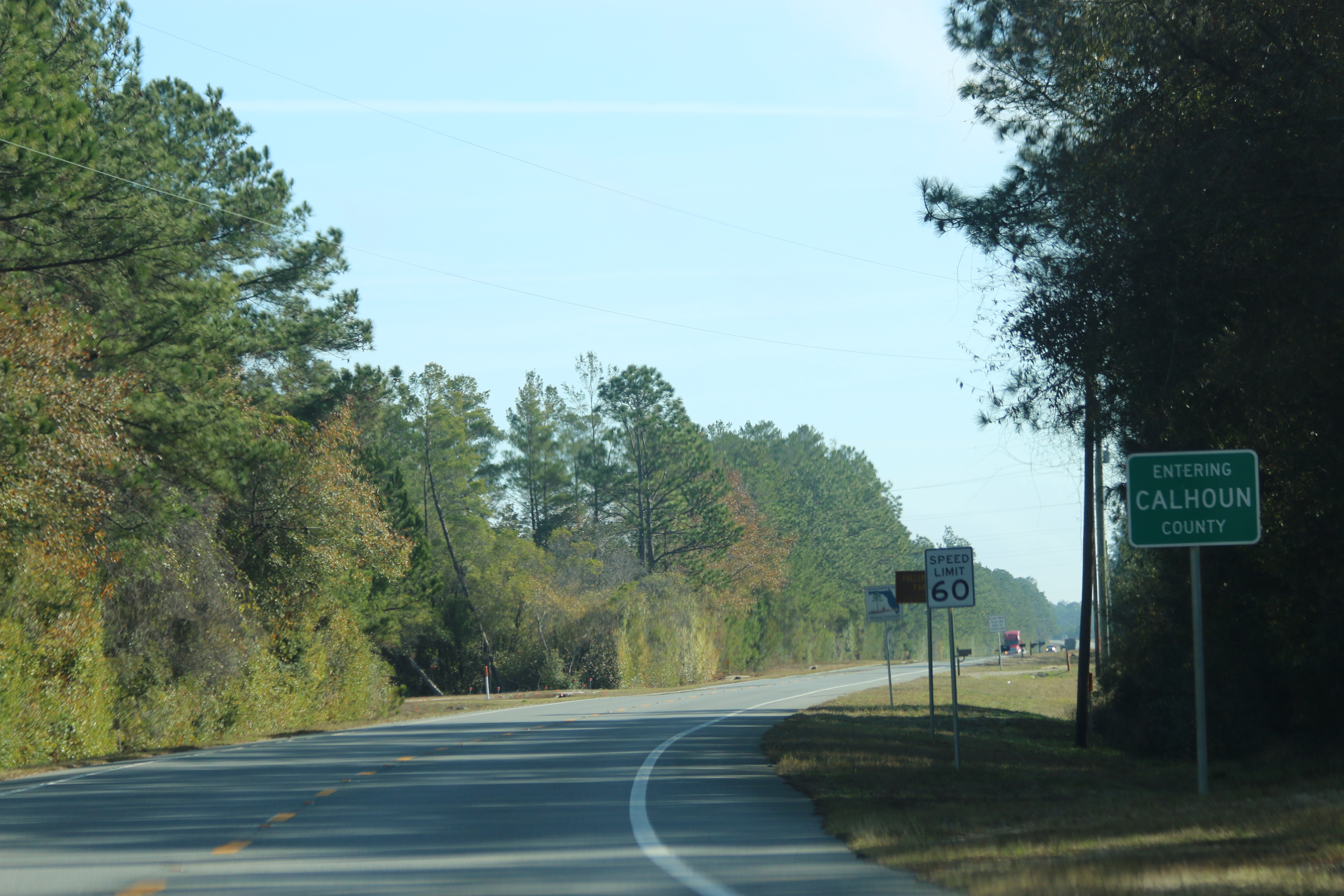
The sign for Calhoun County on FL 20

Calhoun County is not served by any Interstate or U.S. Highways; the nearest access to the Interstate Highway System is Interstate 10 in Sneads in neighboring Jackson County and to the U.S. Highway System is U.S. Route 231 in northeastern Bay County.

- SR 20 is major east–west state highway linking Niceville to the state capital Tallahassee.
- SR 69 begins at FL 71 in Blountstown.
- SR 71 is major north–south state highway linking Port St. Joe to Alabama.
- SR 73 begins at FL 71 in southern Calhoun County.

=== Airport ===
- Calhoun County Airport (Florida)

== Government and politics ==
United States presidential election results for Calhoun County, Florida
Year	Republican		Democratic		Third party(ies)	
Year	No.	%	No.	%	No.	%
1904	160	40.30%	162	40.81%	75	18.89%
1908	339	49.56%	241	35.23%	104	15.20%
1912	67	10.15%	332	50.30%	261	39.55%
1916	209	24.85%	539	64.09%	93	11.06%
1920	99	9.02%	861	78.42%	138	12.57%
1924	56	10.79%	406	78.23%	57	10.98%
1928	409	35.02%	727	62.24%	32	2.74%
1932	129	8.84%	1,331	91.16%	0	0.00%
1936	181	14.79%	1,043	85.21%	0	0.00%
1940	171	9.03%	1,722	90.97%	0	0.00%
1944	207	12.10%	1,504	87.90%	0	0.00%
1948	128	7.13%	1,404	78.26%	262	14.60%
1952	590	24.41%	1,827	75.59%	0	0.00%
1956	554	24.57%	1,701	75.43%	0	0.00%
1960	634	28.46%	1,594	71.54%	0	0.00%
1964	1,793	64.66%	980	35.34%	0	0.00%
1968	356	11.38%	398	12.72%	2,375	75.90%
1972	2,069	81.68%	461	18.20%	3	0.12%
1976	1,153	31.26%	2,487	67.42%	49	1.33%
1980	1,504	38.72%	2,300	59.22%	80	2.06%
1984	2,493	65.48%	1,312	34.46%	2	0.05%
1988	2,422	64.01%	1,329	35.12%	33	0.87%
1992	1,721	37.58%	1,665	36.36%	1,193	26.05%
1996	1,717	41.29%	1,794	43.15%	647	15.56%
2000	2,873	55.52%	2,156	41.66%	146	2.82%
2004	3,782	63.42%	2,116	35.49%	65	1.09%
2008	4,345	69.36%	1,821	29.07%	98	1.56%
2012	4,366	70.61%	1,664	26.91%	153	2.47%
2016	4,655	75.96%	1,241	20.25%	232	3.79%
2020	5,274	80.68%	1,209	18.49%	54	0.83%
2024	5,367	83.29%	1,021	15.84%	56	0.87%

United States Senate election results for Calhoun County, Florida1
Year	Republican		Democratic		Third party(ies)	
Year	No.	%	No.	%	No.	%
2024	5,280	82.90%	976	15.32%	113	1.77%

United States Senate election results for Calhoun County, Florida3
Year	Republican		Democratic		Third party(ies)	
Year	No.	%	No.	%	No.	%
2022	4,067	84.17%	700	14.49%	65	1.35%

Florida Gubernatorial election results for Calhoun County
Year	Republican		Democratic		Third party(ies)	
Year	No.	%	No.	%	No.	%
1994	1,775	49.50%	1,811	50.50%	0	0.00%
1998	1,796	60.13%	1,191	39.87%	0	0.00%
2002	1,917	45.10%	2,274	53.49%	60	1.41%
2006	1,737	50.79%	1,563	45.70%	120	3.51%
2010	2,201	51.23%	1,855	43.18%	240	5.59%
2014	2,676	63.91%	1,202	28.71%	309	7.38%
2018	3,576	77.59%	923	20.03%	110	2.39%
2022	4,180	86.04%	657	13.52%	21	0.43%

Like most of the Florida Panhandle, Calhoun County votes heavily Republican in presidential and congressional races, but occasionally supports conservative Democrats in local and state contests. The county commission has five members, each of whom is elected from a separate district. As required by the Florida Constitution, Calhoun County has an elected clerk of court, sheriff, supervisor of elections, property appraiser, and tax collector, and the county also elects the superintendent of schools.

=== County government ===
Calhoun County Commission
District	Commissioner	Party	Current term ends
1	Ben Hall	Republican	2028
2	Aaron Carter	Republican	2026
3	Darryl O'Bryan	Republican	2028
4	Scott Monlyn	Democratic	2026
5	Chad Bailey	Republican	2028

Calhoun County elected officials
Office	Officeholder	Party	Current term ends
Sheriff	Michael Bryant	Republican	2028
Clerk of Court	Robin "Cissy" Barfield	Republican	2028
Property Appraiser	Carla Trickey Peacock	Republican	2028
Supervisor of Elections	Sharon Chason	Republican	2028
Tax Collector	Chris Rogers	Republican	2028
Superintendent of Schools	Darryl Taylor, Jr.	Republican	2028

=== Voter registration ===
According to the Secretary of State's office, Republicans hold a narrow majority among registered voters in Calhoun County as of 2022. However, Democrats held a sizable majority of registered voters as recently as 2017.

Calhoun County Voter Registration & Party Enrollment as of March 31, 2022
Political Party	Total Voters	Percentage
Republican	3,655	44.79%
Democratic	3,500	42.89%
Independent	955	11.70%
Third Parties	50	0.61%
Total	8,160	100%

== Education ==
=== Primary and secondary schools ===
Calhoun County School District operates public schools. Its two senior high schools are Blountstown High School and Altha Public School.

=== Library ===
Along with the six branches within the Calhoun County Public Library System, Calhoun County is also a part of the Panhandle Public Library Cooperative System. PPLCS also includes Holmes and Jackson counties. Branches are located in the following communities and offer public computers with internet access, free wi-fi, programming for all ages, downloadable e-books and e-audiobooks, and numerous online databases and resources.

- Blountstown Public Library
- Altha Public Library
- Hugh Creek Public Library
- Kinard Public Library
- Mossy Pond Public Library
- Shelton Public Library

== Communities ==
=== Towns ===
- Blountstown
- Altha

=== Unincorporated communities ===
- Abe Springs
- Broad Branch
- Carr Community
- Chason
- Chipola
- Chipola Park
- Clarksville
- Cox
- Eufala
- Frink
- Gaskins
- Kinard
- Leonards
- Marysville
- McNeal
- New Hope
- Ocheesee Landing
- Ocheeseulga
- Pine Island
- Rollins Corner
- Scotts Ferry
- Selman
- Willis

== See also ==
- National Register of Historic Places listings in Calhoun County, Florida
