= Clarksville, Florida =

- Unincorporated community
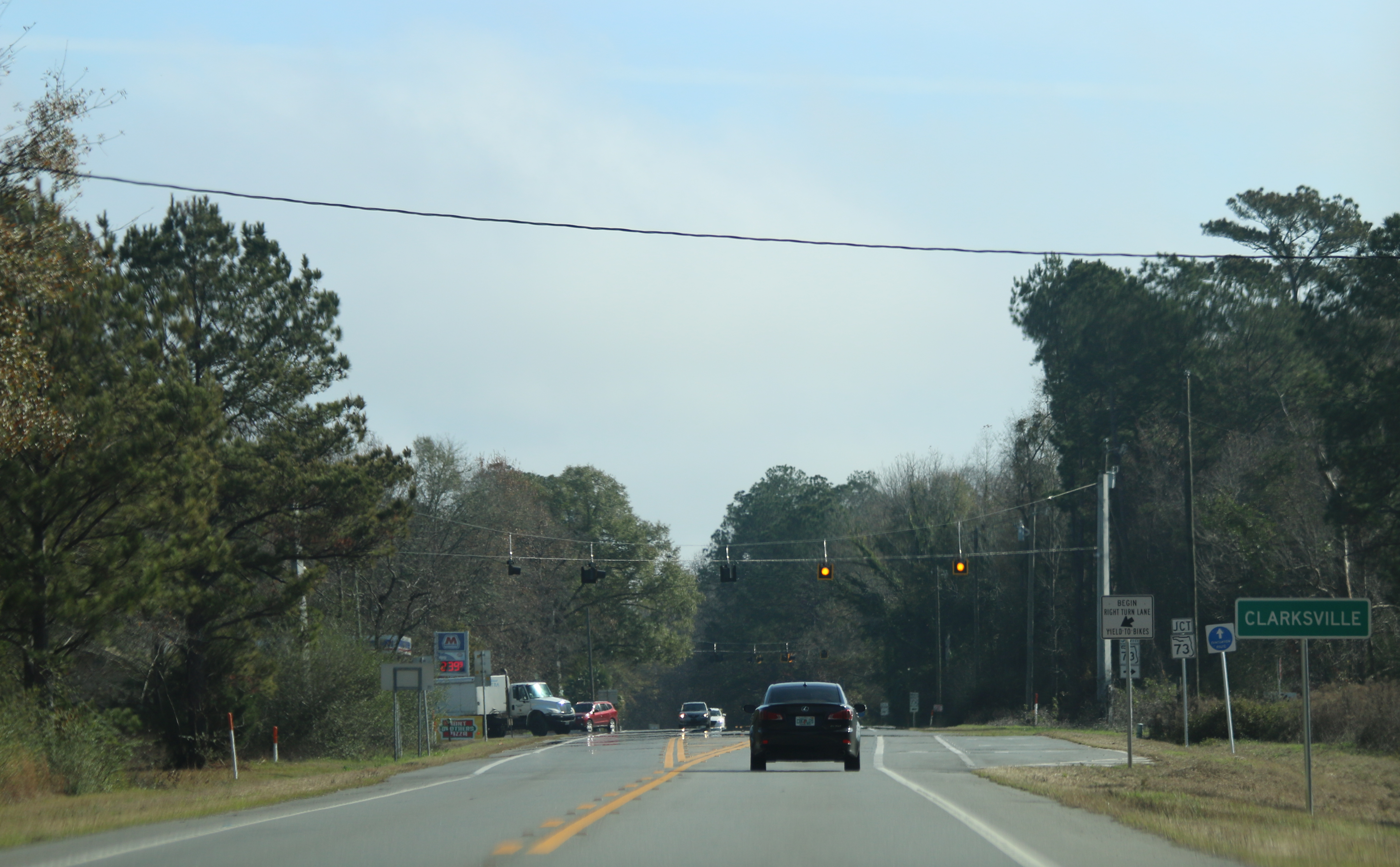
- Sign for Clarksville on State Road 20

- Location within Florida
- Coordinates: 30°26′13″N 85°11′10″W
- Country: United States
- State: Florida
- County: Calhoun
- Elevation: 118 ft (36 m)
- Time zone: UTC-6 (Central (CST))
  - Summer (DST): UTC-5 (CDT)
- ZIP code: 32430
- Area code: 850
- GNIS feature ID: 280501

Clarksville is an unincorporated community in Calhoun County, Florida, United States. The community is located at the intersection of Florida State Road 20 and Florida State Road 73 8.4 miles (13.5 km) west of Blountstown. Clarksville has a post office with ZIP code 32430.

Clarksville is the location of the Juniper Creek Wildlife Management Area as well as the Chipola Experimental Forest.

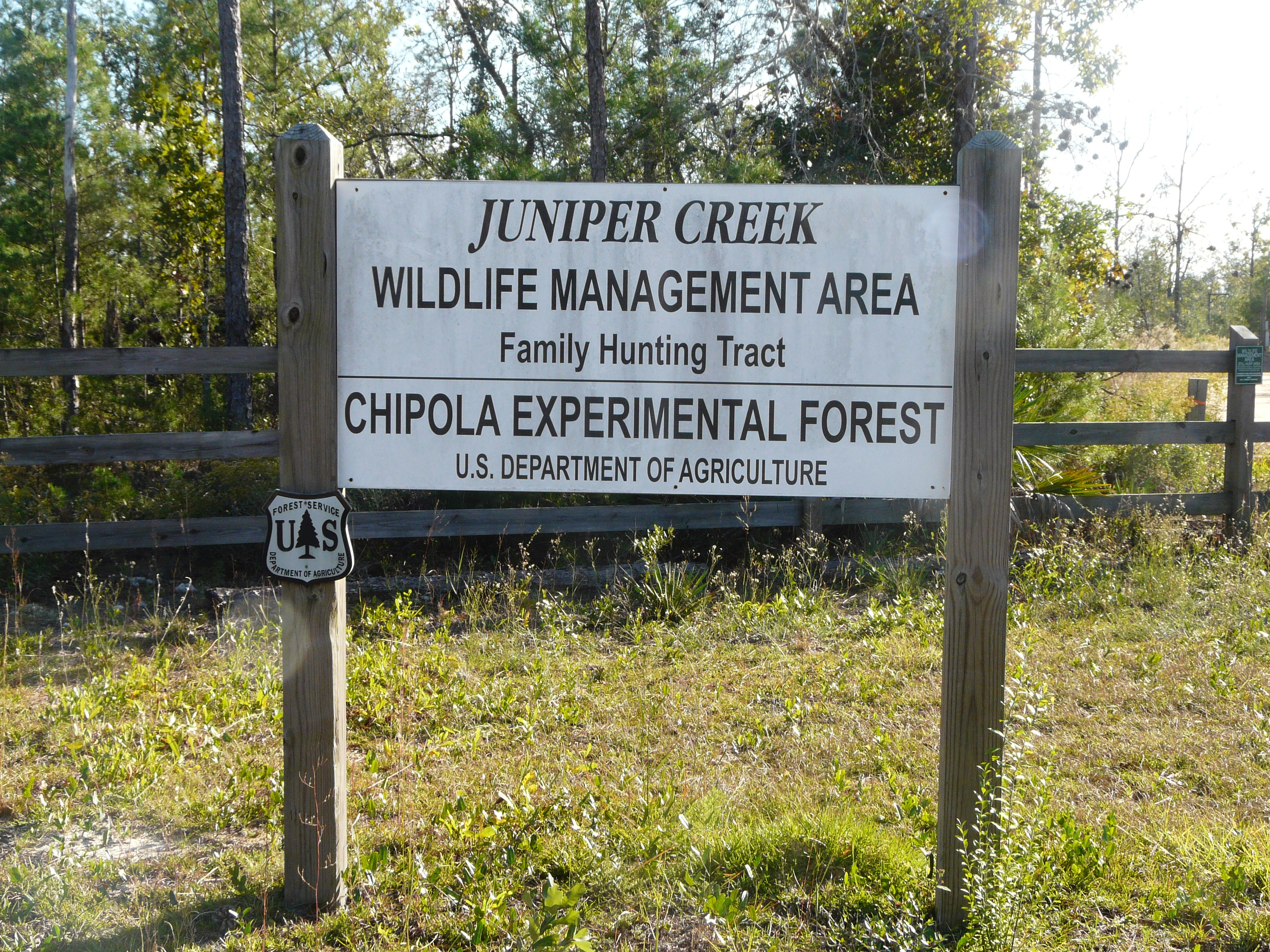
Sign for the Juniper Creek Wildlife Management Area on SR 20 in Clarksville.
