= Kinard, Florida =

Coordinates: 30°16′51″N 85°15′50″W

Kinard
- Unincorporated community
- Interactive map of Kinard
- Country: United States
- State: Florida
- County: Calhoun

Kinard (/ˈkaɪnərd/ KY-nərd) is an unincorporated community in southwestern Calhoun County, Florida, United States. The main roads through Kinard are State Road 73 and County Road 392.
