= Marysville, Florida =

Unincorporated community in Florida, U.S.

Marysville is an unincorporated community in Calhoun County, Florida, United States. It is located on County Road 69.

== Geography ==
Marysville is located at 30°17′40″N 85°05′54″W (30.2944, -85.0983).
