= Calhoun County Airport (Florida) =

Coordinates: 30°29′12.71″N 085°06′50.45″W

- IATA: none; ICAO: none; FAA LID: F95

Summary
- Airport type: Public use
- Owner: Calhoun County BOCC
- Operator: Rob Sims (Airport Manager)
- Serves: Blountstown, Florida and Altha, Florida
- Location: Calhoun County, Florida
- Elevation AMSL: 118 ft (36 m)
- Website: www.flyfoxtrot95.com
- Interactive map of Calhoun County Airport

Runways
Direction	Length		Surface
Direction	ft	m	Surface
18/36	3,600	1,097	Paved

Statistics (2000)
- Aircraft operations: 1,020
- Based aircraft: 36
- Source: Federal Aviation Administration

Calhoun County Airport (FAA LID: X10) is a public airport 5 miles (8.0 km) northwest of Blountstown in Calhoun County, Florida. It is on State Road 71 between Blountstown, FL and Altha, FL and is publicly owned.

== Facilities and aircraft ==
The airport has one runway. It is designated as runway 18/36 and measures 3729 x 75 ft (1137 x 23 m).

The airport has a fixed-base operator that sells both avgas and jet fuel. The FBO offers services such as maintenance and hangars as well as amenities such as conference rooms, a crew lounge, and televisions.

The airport was significantly damaged by Hurricane Michael in 2018, but new state-of-the-art replacements were opened in 2021. Airport managers also requested funding to extend the runway by 1,500 feet to total at least 5,000 feet long.

== Accidents and incidents ==
- On September 19, 2019, a North American T-6 Texan crashed on Calhoun County Airport property following an engine failure. The occupants walked away.
- On May 3, 2022, a Cessna 172 crashed just after departure from the Calhoun County Airport. The aircraft appeared to attain a high angle of attack at a slow speed; it flew just past airport property and crashed beyond a fence.

== See also ==
- List of airports in Florida
