= Pine Island, Calhoun County, Florida =

Unincorporated community in Florida, U.S.

Coordinates: 30°28′26″N 85°02′35″W

Pine Island is an unincorporated community in Calhoun County, Florida, United States. It is located on State Road 69 north of Blountstown.

Pine Island was built upon wetlands of Simmons Creek, a tributary on the west bank of the Apalachicola River.
