= Joseph W. Russ Jr. House =

Historic house in Florida, United States

- Joseph W. Jr. Russ House
- U.S. National Register of Historic Places
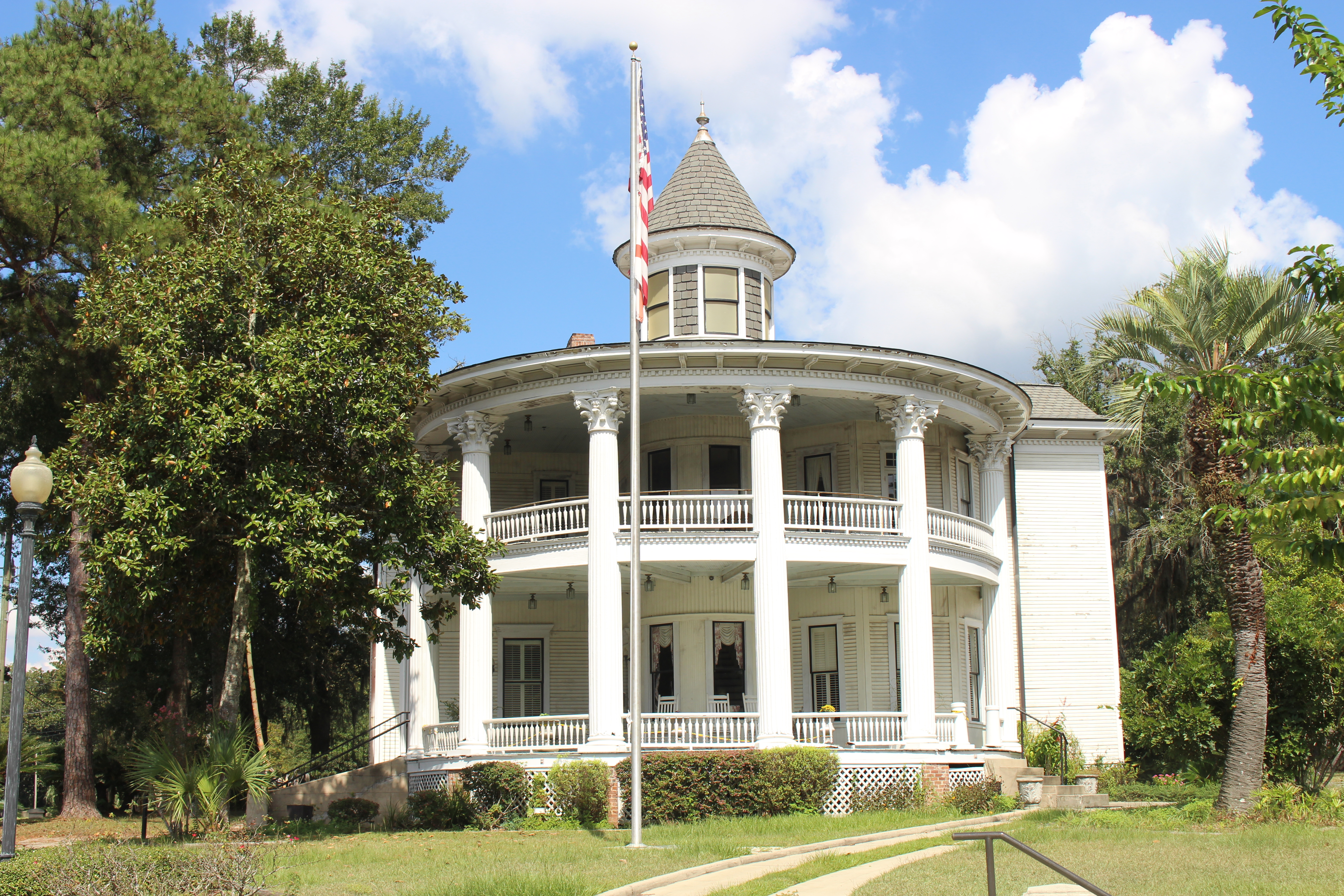
- Jackson County Visitors Center

- Location within Florida Location within the United States
- Location: Marianna, Florida
- Coordinates: 30°46′38″N 85°14′9″W
- Architectural style: Queen Anne, Colonial Revival
- NRHP reference No.: 83001425
- Added to NRHP: July 18, 1983

The Joseph W. Jr. Russ House is a historic site built from 1892 to 1895 in Marianna, Florida. It serves as Jackson County's Visitor a Center, located at 4318 West Lafayette Street. On July 18, 1983, the house was added to the U.S. National Register of Historic Places. Five generations of the Russ family lived in the house over a 100-year span. Joseph Russ was a bachelor when the house was completed and is mother moved in as well. He married Bette Dickerson and they had one daughter named Frances. In 1930 he had lost his life. His daughter Frances lived in the house for 89 years.

Many strangers asked to tour the grand home.
