= Cox, Florida =

Unincorporated community in Florida, U.S.

Cox is an unincorporated community in Calhoun County, Florida, United States. It is located on State Road 71.

== Geography ==
Cox is located at 30°36′06″N 85°08′21″W.
