= Selman, Florida =

Unincorporated community in Florida, U.S.

- Interactive map of Selman, Florida
- Country: United States
- State: Florida
- County: Calhoun County

Selman is an unincorporated community in Calhoun County, Florida, United States. It is located on State Road 69.

== Geography ==
Selman is located at 30°32′09″N 85°01′43″W (30.5358, -85.0286).
