= Jackson County, Florida =

County in Florida, United States

- County
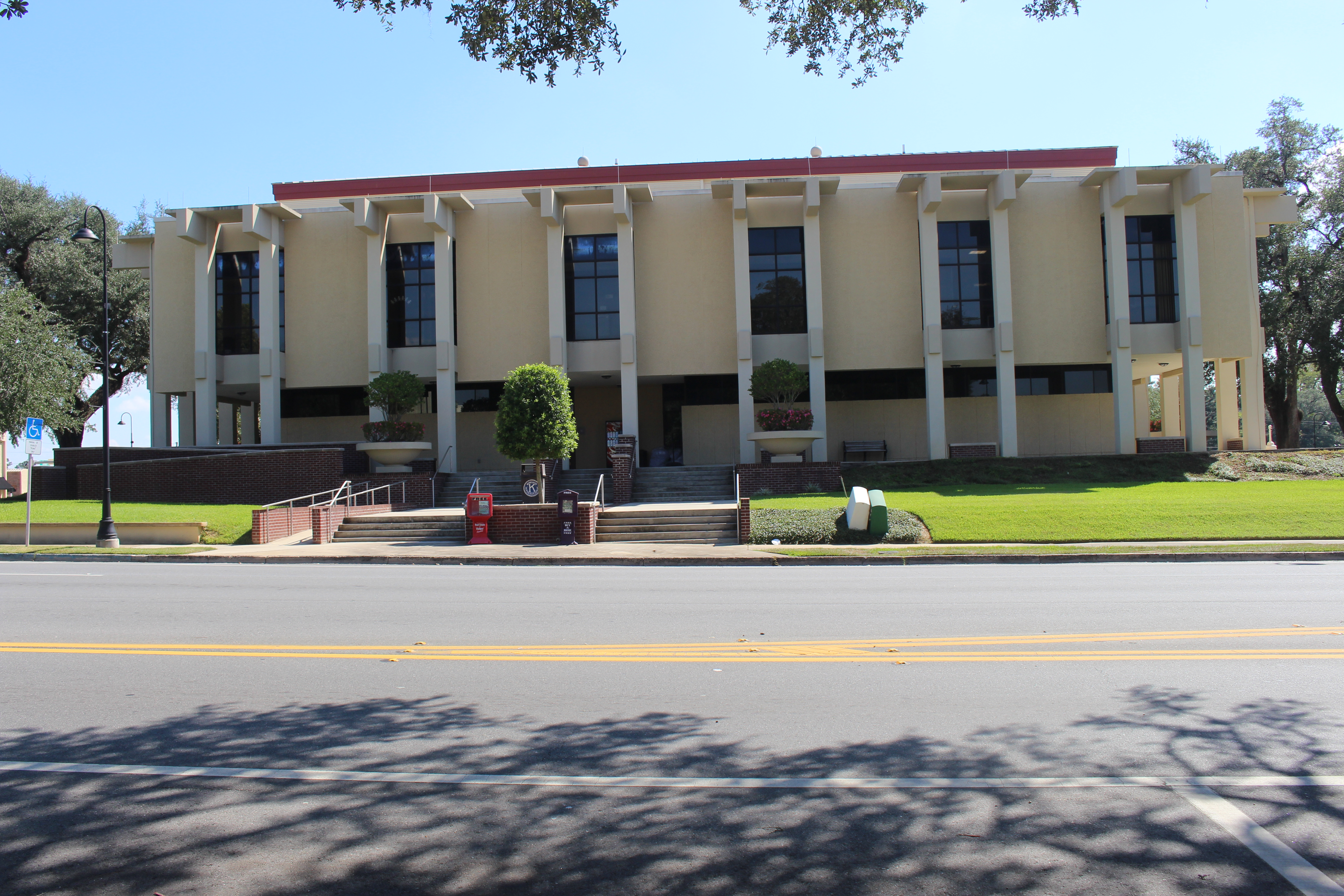
- Jackson County Courthouse

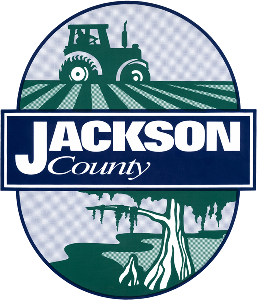
- Seal

- Location within the U.S. state of Florida
- Coordinates: 30°48′N 85°13′W
- Country: United States
- State: Florida
- Founded: August 12, 1822
- Named for: Andrew Jackson
- Seat: Marianna
- Largest city: Marianna

Area
  - Total: 955 sq mi (2,470 km^{2})
  - Land: 918 sq mi (2,380 km^{2})
  - Water: 37 sq mi (96 km^{2}) 3.9%

Population (2020)
  - Total: 47,319
  - Estimate (2025): 49,629 ▲
  - Density: 51.5/sq mi (19.9/km^{2})
- Time zone: UTC−6 (Central)
  - Summer (DST): UTC−5 (CDT)
- Congressional district: 2nd
- Website: jacksoncountyfl.gov

Jackson County is a county located in the Panhandle of the U.S. state of Florida. As of the 2020 census, the population was 47,319. Its county seat is Marianna. The county shares a border with Alabama and Georgia.

== History ==
Jackson County was created by the Florida Territorial Council in 1822 out of Escambia County, at the same time that Duval County was organized from land of St. Johns County, making them the third and fourth counties in the Territory. The county was named for Andrew Jackson, a General of the War of 1812, who had served as Florida's first military governor for six months in 1821. Jackson County originally extended from the Choctawhatchee River on the west to the Suwannee River on the east. By 1840 the county had been reduced close to its present boundaries through the creation of new counties from its original territory, following an increase of population in these areas. Minor adjustments to the county boundaries continued through most of the 19th century, however.

There were no towns in Jackson County when it was formed. The first county court met at what was called "Robinson's Big Spring" (later called Blue Springs) in 1822 and then at the "Big Spring of the Choctawhatchee" in 1823. The following year the county court met at "Chipola Settlement", which is also known as Waddell's Mill Pond.

The forced labor of enslaved African Americans allowed European Americans to develop this area of Florida as part of the plantation belt in the antebellum years. Cotton was cultivated as a commodity crop by large workgangs, and Florida became a slave society.

Gradually towns were developed. In January 1821, Webbville was established as the first town in Jackson County. It was the first designated as the county seat.

Marianna was founded in September 1821 by Robert Beveridge, a native of Scotland. It developed about 9 miles (14 km) southeast of Webbville. About 1828, Beveridge and other Marianna settlers went to Tallahassee to lobby the state legislature to move the county seat to Marianna.

They enticed the Florida Legislature with offers of free land, and to pay locally to construct a county courthouse and develop a related public square. They donated an additional $500 to purchase a quarter section of land to be sold at public auction as a way to finance the new government, if the county seat was moved to Marianna.

Beveridge and his supporters succeeded in their civic bribe. Marianna became the de facto county seat of the county justice and civil authority, although it was never officially proclaimed as such. Marianna began to grow and prosper when the county government moved into the new courthouse in 1829. It became the market and court town for the rural county.

Webbville's prominent citizens moved to Marianna to follow the courts, as did numerous businesses. When the L&N Railroad decided to bypass putting a station at Webbville, the town declined further and became defunct.

=== Jackson County war ===
After the Civil War, the county was convulsed by violence as Confederate veterans and their allies attacked and intimidated freedmen and their sympathizers. The county faced the worst economic conditions in the state, as it had been most extensively developed for cotton plantations before the war, and was adversely affected by the international decline in the market.

White planters resisted dealing with freedmen as free workers. Insurgent Confederate veterans formed a Ku Klux Klan chapter and carried out masked violence to exert power, intimidate freedmen and white sympathizers, suppress their voting, and restore white supremacy.

Throughout the Reconstruction, Jackson County was the main site [in Florida] of political and class struggle between planters and black laborers.... Jackson County [was] so thoroughly dominated by the Klan at every level as to render the county and state governments completely powerless to stop them.

Planters were defaulting on tax payments due to the poor economic conditions, and Republican county officials began to sell thousands of acres in tax sales. In addition the two representatives of the Freedmen's Bureau, Charles Memorial Hamilton and William J. Purman, worked to break the cycle of black labor exploitation. Planters would throw sharecroppers off the land at the end of the season with no payment, claiming infractions that the Bureau deemed minor. The Bureau agents worked to enforce labor contracts.

Tensions broke out into violence and in 1869 Jackson County became the center of a guerrilla war that extended through 1871; it became known as the Jackson County War. The local Ku Klux Klan, insurgent Confederate Army veterans, directed their violence at eradicating the Republican Party in the county, assassinating more than 150 Republican Party leaders and other prominent African Americans as part of a successful campaign to retain white Democratic power in the county. Another source says that in Jackson County, 200 "leading Republicans" were assassinated in 1869 and 1870 alone; no one was arrested or brought to trial for these crimes.

The sheriff...Thomas M. West complained that public sentiment was so strongly opposed to him as sheriff that he did not feel safe to go outside of town and serve any legal process whatsoever. His life was constantly threatened.... He was even openly assaulted in the streets of Marianna, severely beaten to the near-point of death."

In 1871 he resigned, saying given the "lawlessness", he could not carry out the duties of sheriff. The last Republican official in the county, clerk of the circuit court John Quincy Dickinson, was assassinated in 1871. (The previous clerk, Dr. John Finlayson, was killed in 1869.)

In testimony to Congressional hearings about the KKK, state senator Charles H. Pearce, minister of the African Methodist Episcopal Church, said, "Satan has his seat; he reigns in Jackson County."

=== Post-Reconstruction era to present ===
Violence by whites against blacks in the county continued after Reconstruction. Nine African Americans were lynched here after Reconstruction, most around the turn of the 20th century. But notorious lynchings of individual men also took place later.

In 1934, Claude Neal, an African-American suspect in the murder of a young white woman, was tortured, shot and hanged in a spectacle lynching that was announced beforehand on the radio and in a local paper. It was covered by national newspapers, arousing condemnation.

In addition, Neal's lynching was followed by a white riot in Marianna, in which whites attacked the black section of town and blacks on the street, injuring 200, including two police officers, and causing much property damage. Howard Kester, a prominent Southern evangelical minister who tried to improve conditions, assessed the economic and class issues related to the racial violence.

In 1943 the last known lynching in the county took place. Cellos Harrison, an African-American man, had been twice convicted by an all-white jury and sentenced to death. He was taken from the county jail in Marianna by a white mob and hanged while his case was being appealed.

== Geography ==
According to the U.S. Census Bureau, the county has a total area of 955 square miles (2,470 km^{2}), of which 918 square miles (2,380 km^{2}) is land and 37 square miles (96 km^{2}) (3.9%) is water. Jackson County is the only county in Florida that borders both Georgia and Alabama and is the closest Florida county to the Tripoint. Jackson County is in the Central Standard Time Zone. Its eastern border with Gadsden County forms the boundary in this area between the Central Standard and Eastern Standard Time Zones.

=== Adjacent counties ===
- Seminole County, Georgia - east (EST)
- Gadsden County, Florida - southeast (EST)
- Liberty County, Florida - southeast (EST)
- Calhoun County, Florida - south
- Washington County, Florida - southwest
- Bay County, Florida - southwest
- Holmes County, Florida - west
- Geneva County, Alabama - northwest
- Houston County, Alabama - north

=== Rivers and water bodies ===
Three water bodies form the eastern border of Jackson county. The Chattahoochee River forms the northeast boundary between Jackson County and Seminole County, Georgia. It flows into Lake Seminole. The Lake was formed by the Jim Woodruff Dam, which was completed in 1952.

The outflow at the dam becomes the Apalachicola River, which is the eastern boundary of Jackson county with Gadsden county.

The Chipola River is formed in north central Jackson county from the confluences of Black Creek and Cowarts Creek. It continues south through the county and becomes a part of the border between Jackson county and the west side of the northern section of Calhoun county.

Holmes Creek forms the northern portion of the western border of Jackson county with Holmes County.

Blue Springs is a Jackson county recreation area east of Marianna located near the site of former Florida Governor John Milton's Sylvania plantation.

Two other notable water bodies in the county are Compass Lake in the southwest and Ocheesee Pond in the southeast.

=== Florida State Parks in Jackson County ===
- Florida Caverns State Park is on the Chipola river. At Blue Hole Springs, the river disappears underground for a few thousand feet and then resurfaces.
- Three Rivers State Park is located north of Sneads. It is at the junction of the Chattahoochee and the Flint (which flow into Lake Seminole from Georgia), and the Apalachicola, which begins at the Lake Seminole Dam.

== Demographics ==
Historical population
Census	Pop.	Note	%±
1830	3,907		—
1840	4,681		19.8%
1850	6,639		41.8%
1860	10,209		53.8%
1870	9,528		−6.7%
1880	14,372		50.8%
1890	17,544		22.1%
1900	23,377		33.2%
1910	29,821		27.6%
1920	31,224		4.7%
1930	31,969		2.4%
1940	34,428		7.7%
1950	34,645		0.6%
1960	36,208		4.5%
1970	34,434		−4.9%
1980	39,154		13.7%
1990	41,375		5.7%
2000	46,755		13.0%
2010	49,746		6.4%
2020	47,319		−4.9%
2025 (est.)	49,629	▲	4.9%
U.S. Decennial Census; 1790-1960 1900-1990; 1990-2000 2020

=== Racial and ethnic composition ===
Jackson County, Florida – Racial and ethnic composition Note: the US Census treats Hispanic/Latino as an ethnic category. This table excludes Latinos from the racial categories and assigns them to a separate category. Hispanics/Latinos may be of any race.
Race / Ethnicity (NH = Non-Hispanic)	Pop 1980	Pop 1990	Pop 2000	Pop 2010	Pop 2020	% 1980	% 1990	% 2000	% 2010	% 2020
White alone (NH)	28,425	29,376	32,086	33,111	30,629	72.60%	71.00%	68.63%	66.56%	64.73%
Black or African American alone (NH)	10,073	10,721	12,273	13,106	12,042	25.73%	25.91%	26.25%	26.35%	25.45%
Native American or Alaska Native alone (NH)	125	215	291	305	196	0.32%	0.52%	0.62%	0.61%	0.41%
Asian alone (NH)	64	82	160	227	292	0.16%	0.20%	0.34%	0.46%	0.62%
Native Hawaiian or Pacific Islander alone (NH)	x	x	10	25	18	x	x	0.02%	0.05%	0.04%
Other race alone (NH)	33	7	26	50	144	0.08%	0.02%	0.06%	0.10%	0.30%
Mixed race or Multiracial (NH)	x	x	548	779	1,783	x	x	1.17%	1.57%	3.77%
Hispanic or Latino (any race)	434	974	1,361	2,143	2,215	1.11%	2.35%	2.91%	4.31%	4.68%
Total	39,154	41,375	46,755	49,746	47,319	100.00%	100.00%	100.00%	100.00%	100.00%

A map of racial demographics in Jackson County, Florida Legend: Non-Hispanic White 50–60% 60–70% 70–80% 80–90% Black or African American 50–60% 60–70%

=== 2020 census ===
As of the 2020 census, Jackson County had a population of 47,319 people, 17,083 households, and 11,179 families. The population density was 51.5 per square mile (19.9/km^{2}). The median age was 42.9 years, with 19.1% under the age of 18, 7.7% from 18 to 24, 25.7% from 25 to 44, 27.2% from 45 to 64, and 20.2% who were 65 years of age or older. For every 100 females there were 119.5 males, and for every 100 females age 18 and over there were 122.3 males.

Of the 17,083 households, 28.8% had children under the age of 18 living in them; 43.4% were married couples living together; 19.7% had a male householder with no spouse or partner present; and 31.1% had a female householder with no spouse or partner present. About 30.0% of all households were made up of individuals and 14.9% had someone living alone who was 65 years of age or older. There were 19,882 housing units, of which 14.1% were vacant; among occupied units, 72.4% were owner-occupied and 27.6% were renter-occupied. The homeowner vacancy rate was 1.5% and the rental vacancy rate was 9.5%.

11.8% of residents lived in urban areas, while 88.2% lived in rural areas.

According to the redistricting data, the racial makeup was 66.3% White, 25.7% Black or African American, 0.5% American Indian and Alaska Native, 0.6% Asian, less than 0.1% Native Hawaiian and Pacific Islander, 2.1% from some other race, and 4.8% from two or more races, while Hispanic or Latino residents of any race comprised 4.7% of the population. The census counted 31,381 white residents (64.73% non-Hispanic white), 12,150 black residents, 225 Native American or Alaska Native residents, 294 Asian residents, 18 Pacific Islander or Native Hawaiian residents, 986 residents from other races, and 2,265 residents of two or more races.

=== American Community Survey 2016–2020 estimates ===
The average household size was 2.3 and the average family size was 2.8. The percent of those with a bachelor's degree or higher was estimated to be 9.8% of the population.

The 2016–2020 5-year American Community Survey estimates show that the median household income was $40,754 (with a margin of error of +/- $1,741) and the median family income was $51,744 (+/- $2,303). Males had a median income of $31,753 (+/- $1,635) versus $26,189 (+/- $1,545) for females. The median income for those above 16 years old was $29,322 (+/- $1,229). Approximately, 14.5% of families and 18.1% of the population were below the poverty line, including 25.4% of those under the age of 18 and 11.1% of those ages 65 or over.

=== 2000 census ===
As of the census of 2000, there were 46,755 people, 16,620 households, and 11,600 families residing in the county. The population density was 51 people per square mile (20 people/km^{2}). There were 19,490 housing units at an average density of 21 per square mile (8.1/km^{2}). The racial makeup of the county was 72.18% White, 24.56% Black or African American, 0.77% Native American, 0.46% Asian, 0.03% Pacific Islander, 0.61% from other races, and 1.40% from two or more races. 2.91% of the population were Hispanic or Latino of any race.

There were 16,620 households, out of which 30.90% had children under the age of 18 living with them, 51.50% were married couples living together, 14.40% had a female householder with no husband present, and 30.20% were non-families. 27.00% of all households were made up of individuals, and 12.80% had someone living alone who was 65 years of age or older. The average household size was 2.44 and the average family size was 2.95.

In the county, the population was spread out, with 22.30% under the age of 18, 9.70% from 18 to 24, 29.60% from 25 to 44, 23.80% from 45 to 64, and 14.60% who were 65 years of age or older. The median age was 38 years. For every 100 females there were 110.40 males. For every 100 females age 18 and over, there were 111.20 males.

The median income for a household in the county was $29,744, and the median income for a family was $36,404. Males had a median income of $27,138 versus $21,180 for females. The per capita income for the county was $13,905. About 12.80% of families and 17.20% of the population were below the poverty line, including 23.70% of those under age 18 and 21.00% of those age 65 or over.

== Politics ==
United States presidential election results for Jackson County, Florida
Year	Republican		Democratic		Third party(ies)	
Year	No.	%	No.	%	No.	%
1904	354	20.47%	1,186	68.59%	189	10.93%
1908	353	20.90%	1,122	66.43%	214	12.67%
1912	163	9.61%	1,205	71.01%	329	19.39%
1916	410	16.53%	1,975	79.60%	96	3.87%
1920	508	16.37%	2,443	78.70%	153	4.93%
1924	320	14.59%	1,771	80.76%	102	4.65%
1928	1,398	35.43%	2,516	63.76%	32	0.81%
1932	599	11.03%	4,832	88.97%	0	0.00%
1936	351	8.54%	3,757	91.46%	0	0.00%
1940	866	13.38%	5,607	86.62%	0	0.00%
1944	951	17.03%	4,633	82.97%	0	0.00%
1948	648	11.27%	3,169	55.11%	1,933	33.62%
1952	2,398	29.53%	5,722	70.47%	0	0.00%
1956	2,543	29.86%	5,973	70.14%	0	0.00%
1960	2,851	32.23%	5,994	67.77%	0	0.00%
1964	7,064	61.69%	4,386	38.31%	0	0.00%
1968	1,236	10.02%	2,472	20.05%	8,622	69.93%
1972	8,904	79.99%	2,220	19.94%	8	0.07%
1976	4,795	37.90%	7,687	60.76%	170	1.34%
1980	6,348	44.76%	7,567	53.36%	266	1.88%
1984	9,091	64.70%	4,960	35.30%	0	0.00%
1988	8,405	62.20%	5,008	37.06%	100	0.74%
1992	6,725	45.82%	5,482	37.35%	2,469	16.82%
1996	7,189	46.34%	6,667	42.98%	1,657	10.68%
2000	9,139	56.06%	6,870	42.14%	294	1.80%
2004	12,122	61.20%	7,555	38.14%	130	0.66%
2008	13,717	63.47%	7,671	35.49%	225	1.04%
2012	13,418	64.00%	7,342	35.02%	207	0.99%
2016	14,257	67.38%	6,397	30.23%	505	2.39%
2020	15,488	68.97%	6,766	30.13%	202	0.90%
2024	16,074	72.56%	5,892	26.60%	186	0.84%

Jackson County is governed by a five-member board of county commissioners.

Politically, the county is predominantly Republican. The last time a Democrat won the county in the presidential election was 1980, when Jimmy Carter, the former governor of neighboring Georgia, was on the ballot. The county is part of Florida's 2nd congressional district, represented by Neal Dunn (R-Panama City).

At the state level, Jackson County is part of Florida State Senate district 2. This district is represented by Jay Trumbull (R-Panama City). In the State House of Representatives, the county forms part of House district 5. This district is represented by Shane Abbott (R-DeFuniak Springs).

== Education ==
The Jackson County School Board, the sole school district of the county, operates public schools.

Jackson County is also home to Baptist College of Florida, an institution of higher education in Graceville affiliated with the Florida Baptist Convention, and Chipola College, a state college in Marianna.

== Libraries ==
The Jackson County Public Library System has three branches. Jackson County is also a part of the Panhandle Public Library Cooperative System. The PPLCS includes libraries of Holmes and Calhoun counties.

- Marianna
- Graceville
- Greenwood

== Government and infrastructure ==
The Florida Department of Corrections operates Region I - Correctional Facility Office in an unincorporated area in Jackson County.

The Florida Department of Juvenile Justice Dozier School for Boys, closed in 2011 after extensive investigations of abuse, was located in Marianna. It had operated there from January 1900. After it was closed, numerous unmarked graves were found. Combined federal and state efforts succeeded in identifying many, but not all, victims who had died at the school.

Sheriff Donald L. Edenfield is the current Sheriff of Jackson County and serves an area of over 955 square miles (2,470 km^{2}). In 2018, the department fired deputy Zachary Wester, who was arrested for planting drugs in the vehicles of innocent motorists. The sheriff's department has dropped charges in 119 cases.

Jackson County Fire Rescue provides EMS and Fire Services with over 30 to 35 personnel.

== Transportation ==
=== Airports ===
Jackson County's main airport is Marianna Municipal Airport, originally known as the Graham Air Base. Local and private airports also exist throughout the county.

=== Major highways ===
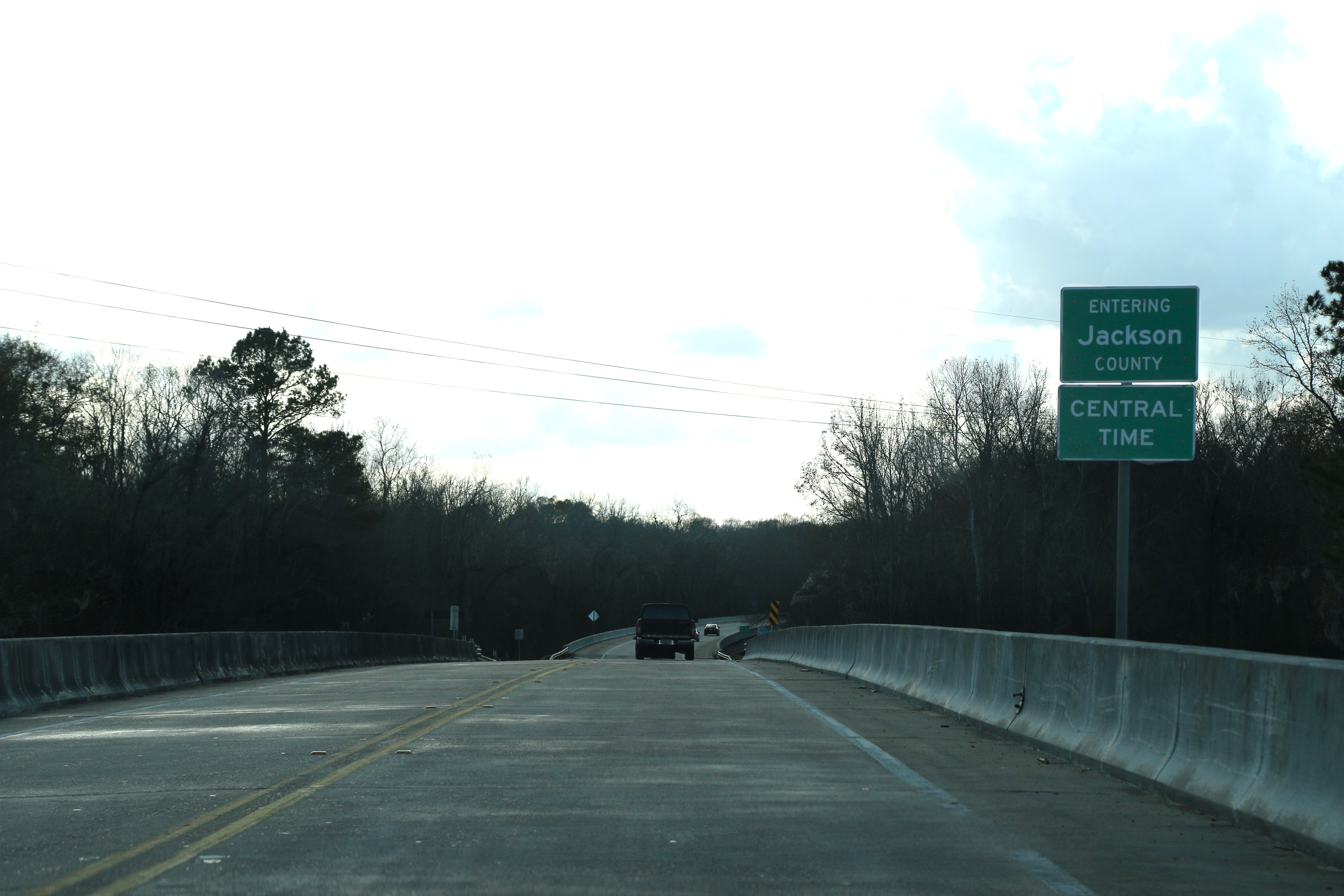
The sign for Jackson County on U.S. Route 90.

- I-10 (Interstate 10) is the main west-to-east interstate highway in the county, and runs along southern Jackson County for a length of 33 miles. It contains five interchanges within the county; US 231 (Exit 130), SR 276 (Exit 136), SR 71 (Exit 142), SR 69 (Exit 152), and CR 268 (Exit 158).
- US 90 (U.S. Highway 90) was the main west-to-east highway in the county, until it was surpassed by I-10.
- US 231 (U.S. Highway 231) is the sole south-to-north U.S. highway running through the western part of the county.
- SR 2 is the west to east route that's closest to the Alabama border.
- SR 69 is a south-to-north state highway that enters from Calhoun County north of Ocheesee. North of the interchange with I-10, it passes through Grand Ridge, Dellwood, Two Egg, and finally terminates at SR 71 in Greenwood, across from the eastern terminus of Jackson County Road 162.
- SR 71 is a south-to-north highway that enters the county from Altha in Calhoun County. North of the interchange with I-10, it has a westbound overlap with US 90 for approximately 1.7 miles, then branches off in a northeasterly direction. Curving north, it passes the Marianne Municipal Airport, then runs through Malone, only to curve to the northwest on its way to the Alabama State Line where it becomes AL 53.
- SR 73 is a south-to-north highway that enters the county from Willis in Calhoun County. In Marianna, Florida it has a westbound overlap with US 90 which begins at the southern terminus of SR 166. then branches off in a northwesterly direction for 9 miles until finally terminating at US 231.
- SR 77 is a south-to-north highway running through northwestern Jackson County from Chipley, Florida in Washington County. The road has an overlap with SR 2 in Graceville and terminates at the Alabama State Line where it becomes AL 109.
- SR 166 is a short south to north state highway running through Marianna and a portion of rural Jackson County northeast of the city limits.
- SR 273 is a south to north state highway running through northwestern Jackson County.
- SR 276 exists primarily in Marianna, but has county extensions in both Washington and Jackson Counties.

=== Railroads ===
Jackson County has two railroad lines. The primary one is the CSX P&A Subdivision, a line formerly owned by the Louisville and Nashville Railroad that served Amtrak's Sunset Limited. This service formerly went to New Orleans, but in 2005 service was truncated by the extensive damage in the Gulf area due to Hurricane Katrina. Another is the Bay Line Railroad: originally the Atlanta and St. Andrews Bay Railway main line, this railway runs from Panama City through Campbellton. US 231 was constructed parallel to the railroad. The lines have a junction in Cottondale. Other lines within the county were abandoned after restructuring of the railroad industry in the mid to late 20th century. Passenger traffic declined after affordable automobiles became widely available.

== Communities ==
=== Cities ===
- Graceville
- Jacob City
- Marianna

=== Towns ===
- Alford
- Bascom
- Campbellton
- Cottondale
- Grand Ridge
- Greenwood
- Malone
- Sneads

=== Unincorporated communities ===
- Compass Lake
- Cypress
- Dellwood
- Oakdale
- Round Lake
- Simsville
- Sink Creek
- Two Egg
- Webbville

== See also ==
- National Register of Historic Places listings in Jackson County, Florida
