= Willis, Florida =

Unincorporated community in Florida, U.S.

Willis is an unincorporated community in Calhoun County, Florida, United States. It is located on State Road 73, one mile north of Chason, Florida. Willis was settled by 1895. An alleged bank robber, Thomas Powell, arrested for possession of explosives in 1914 was from Willis, as was a man, William A. Brooks, convicted of embezzlement.

== See also ==
- Look and Tremble

== Geography ==
Willis is located at 30°33′11″N 85°11′12″W (30.5531, -85.1867).
