= Marianna Historic District (Marianna, Florida) =

Historic district in Florida, United States

- U.S. National Register of Historic Places
- U.S. Historic district
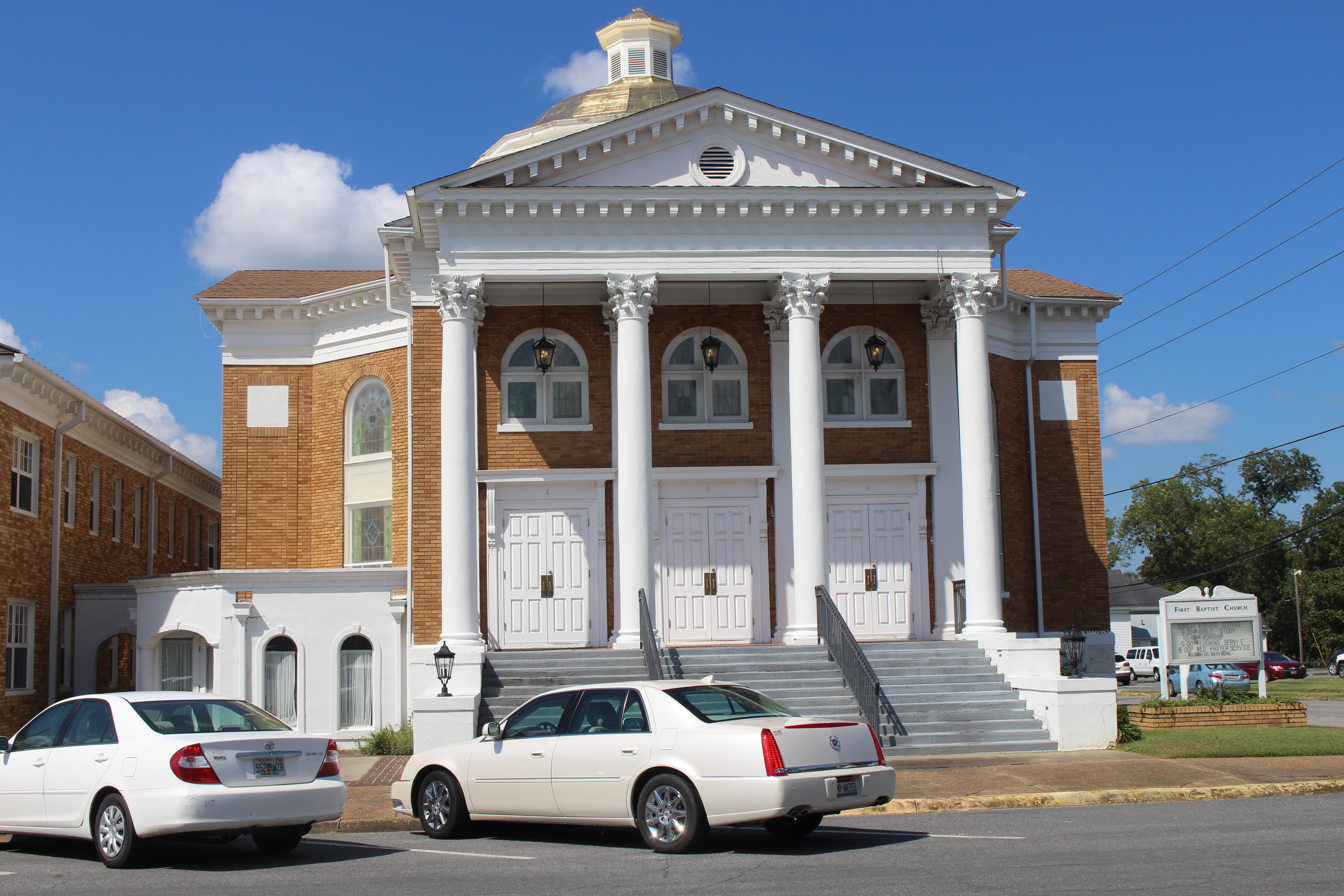
- First Baptist Church, in the district

- Location within Florida Location within the United States
- Location: Marianna, Florida
- Coordinates: 30°46′40″N 85°13′29″W
- Area: 50 acres (0.20 km^{2})
- NRHP reference No.: 97000456
- Added to NRHP: May 23, 1997

The Marianna Historic District is a U.S. historic district (designated as such on May 23, 1997) located in Marianna, Florida. The district is bounded by Davis, Park, Jackson, and Wynn Streets. It contains 181 historic contributing buildings and one contributing object.

It includes the Theophilus West House, which was separately listed on the National Register.
