= List of county roads in Gulf County, Florida =

- County road shields used in Florida

Highway names
- Interstates: Interstate X (I-X)
- US Highways: U.S. Highway X (US X)
- State: State Road X (SR X)
- County: County Road X (CR X)

System links
- County roads in Florida; County roads in Gulf County

The following is a list of county roads in Gulf County, Florida. All county roads are maintained by the county in which they reside, although not all routes are marked with standard county road shields.

== County roads in Gulf County ==
Route	Road Name(s)	From	To	Notes
CR 22	Lake Grove Road	SR 71 in Wewahitchka	Apalachicola River	Former SR 22 and SR 22A
CR 22A	Old Panama Highway	SR 22 west-northwest of Wewahitchka	SR 22 in Wewahitchka	Former SR 22A; Segment running east of Wewahitchka mostly absorbed by CR 22.
CR 30A	Garrison Avenue	SR 30A / SR 30E near Cape San Blas US 98 (SR 30) south-southeast of Port St. Joe	CR 30A at the Franklin County line east-northeast of Indian Pass Sixteenth Street in Port St. Joe	Former SR 30A
CR 30B	Indian Pass Road	CR 30 in Indian Pass	Indian Pass Campground east-southeast of Indian Pass	Former SR 30B
CR 30E	Indian Pass Road	SR 30E at entrance to St. Joseph Peninsula Staste Park	Gulf Breeze Day Use Area	Former SR 30E
CR 71A	Chemical Road	Dead end next to General Chemical's Port St. Joe Works plant east of Port St. Joe	SR 71 / Avenue A east of Port St. Joe	Former SR 71A. Not on 2017 map.
CR 381	Willis Landing Road	SR 71 in Gaskins Still	Willis Landing southeast of Dalkeith	Former SR 381
CR 381A	Lower Dalkeith Road	SR 71 southwest of Dalkeith	CR 381 in Dalkeith	Former SR 381A
CR 382	Industrial Road	US 98 (SR 30) in Port St. Joe	SR 71 northeast of Port St. Joe	Former SR 382
CR 384	Madison Street	US 98 (SR 30) in Port St. Joe	Holly Hill Cemetery east of Port St. Joe	Former SR 384; Formerly may have extended north on Garrison Drive from CR 30A to SR 71.
CR 386	Overstreet Road	US 98 (SR 30) at the Bay County line on the Beacon Hill–Mexico Beach line	SR 71 / 14th Street south of Wewahitchka	Former SR 386
CR 387	Doc Whitfield Road	SR 71 north-northeast of White City	Howard's Creek Landing on the Brothers River east-northeast of White City	Former SR 387 Formerly ran along Stebel Drive in White City.
