= Chipola River =

River in western Florida, United States

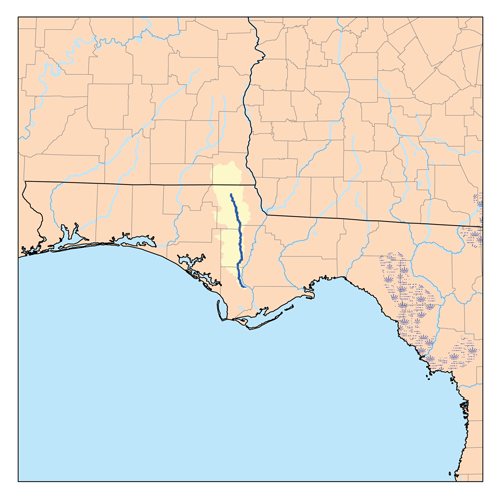
- Map of Chipola River

Physical characteristics
- Source
  - location: Jackson County, Florida Confluence of Marshall Creek and Cowarts Creek
  - coordinates: 30.914°N 85.273°W
  - elevation: 26 m (85 ft)
- Mouth
  - location: Apalachicola River
  - elevation: 1.5 m (5 ft)
- Length: 148.9 km (92.5 mi)
- Basin size: 3,330 km^{2} (1,287 sq mi)
- Width
  - minimum: 7.6 m (25 ft)
  - maximum: over 30 m (100 ft)
- Depth
  - minimum: 0.61 m (2 ft)
  - maximum: 4.6 m (15 ft)
- Discharge
  - average: 103 m^{3} (3,600 cu ft)/sec
  - minimum: 62 m^{3} (2,200 cu ft)/sec
  - maximum: 244 m^{3} (8,600 cu ft)/sec

Basin features
- Tributaries
  - left: Merritts Mill Pond, Rocky Creek, Chipola Cutoff
  - right: Waddells Mill Creek, Dry Creek, Fourmile Creek, Juniper Creek

The Chipola River of northwestern Florida is a major tributary of the Apalachicola River. The upper part of the river flows over a karst terrain where it receives inflow from more than 60 springs. The lower part of the river flows over alluvial deposits of the Apalachicola Delta. Dead Lake, a natural impoundment, is part of the river.

== Course ==
The Chipola River's headwaters are in Houston County, Alabama. The river is formed by the junction of Marshall Creek and Cowarts Creek in northern Jackson County, Florida. The 148.9-kilometre-long (92.5 mi) river passes through Florida Caverns State Park near Marianna, where it briefly becomes an underground river, and continues southward over the Dougherty Karst Plain (Note: The Dougherty Karst Plain is a geomorphologic feature designated as the Dougherty Karst District in Florida and the Dougherty Plain District in Alabama and Georgia. Houston County is in the Dougherty Plain District in Alabama and all of Jackson County and the northernmost part of Calhoun County are in the Doughtery Karst District in Florida.) through Jackson County and northernmost Calhoun County, and over the Apalachicola Delta (Note: The Apalachicola Delta District is a geomorphologic unit defined by the Florida Geological Survey. It consists primarily of quartz sand deposited by the Apalachicola River and its tributaries and by coastal processes when the sea level has been high.) through the balance of Calhoun County and the northern half of Gulf County before joining the Apalachicola River.

The Chipola River at its source is 85 feet (26 m) above sea level, and falls to 5 feet (1.5 m) above sea level at its juncture with the Apalachicola River. It varies from 0.61 metres (2 ft) to 4.6 metres (15 ft) deep, and from 7.6 metres (25 ft) to more than 30 metres (100 ft) wide. The watershed for the river covers about 3,330 square kilometres (1,287 sq mi). The Chipola River is the largest tributary of the Apalachicola River below the junction of the Chattahoochee and Flint rivers, with its drainage basin of 3,100 square kilometres (1,200 sq mi) above where the Chipola Cutoff joins the Chipola River accounting for half of the Apalachicola's drainage basin below that junction. The flow of the Chipola River at the lower end of Dead Lake in 1979/1980 ranged from 62 cubic metres (2,200 cu ft) per second in late autumn to 244 cubic metres (8,600 cu ft) per second at peak Spring floods, for an annual mean flow of 103 cubic metres (3,600 cu ft) per second.

Tributaries of the Chipola River, in addition to Marshall Creek and Cowarts Creek, include Waddells Mill Creek, Merritts Mill Pond, Dry Creek, Rocky Creek, Mill Creek, Fourmile Creek, Juniper Creek, and the Chipola Cutoff. The river is fed by more than 60 springs, including the 1st magnitude Jackson Blue Spring (Note: The Blue Spring Recreation Area is leased from the state and managed by Jackson County.) and several 2nd magnitude springs.

== Dead Lakes ==
An 13-kilometre-long (8 mi), 2,700-hectare (6,700-acre), natural impoundment of the Chipola River near Wewahitchka in southern Calhoun County and northern Gulf County is known as Dead Lake or Dead Lakes. The lake has been described as a cypress swamp. Dead cypress stumps and snags fill the lake, hindering navigation by motor boats. The lake has a good reputation for fishing for redear sunfish (shellcrakers) and bluegill (bream), especially in the spring.

In the later 19th century and into the 20th century the area around the Dead Lakes attracted sports hunters and fishermen, who could travel there by steamboat on the Apalachicola River, landing at an old railroad wharf at the town of Iola, where hotels, boarding houses and fishing and hunting clubs were available. (Note: An 1892 brochure advertised the Lake View Hotel, 2.4 kilometres (1.5 mi) from the steamboat landing at Iola, and 140 metres (150 yd) from the Chipola Dead Lakes. The brochure praises the fishing, hunting, and scenery of the Dead Lakes. The author of a testimonial letter in the brochure writes of spending the previous 20 winters at the Chipola Dead Lakes.)

=== Levee ===
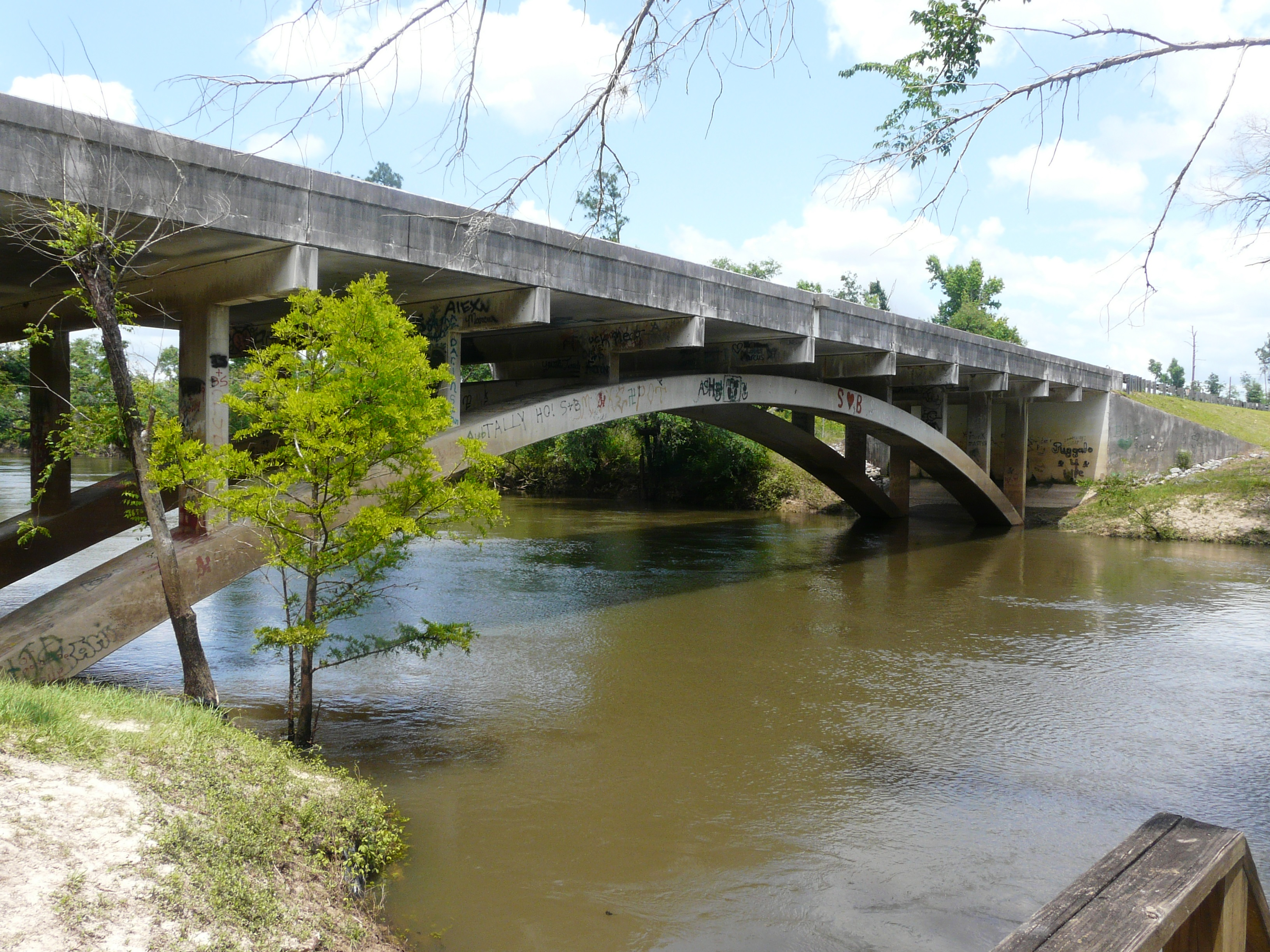
The Wilis Bridge in Calhoun County

Dead Lake is impounded by a levee created by the Apalachicola River across the mouth of the Chipola. The junction of the Chipola with the Apalachicola was originally just below the lower end of Dead Lake. The Apalachicola carries a much heavier sediment load than the Chipola, and deposits of that sediment raised the bed and banks of the Apalachicola above those of the Chipola at their junction. The bottom of Dead Lake is 1.5 to 3 metres (4 ft 11 in to 9 ft 10 in) lower than the bottom of the adjacent section of the Apalachicola, and the basin for the lake is up to 7.6 metres (25 ft) lower than the Apalachicola's floodplain. The Apalachicola subsequently shifted most of its flow eastward to a new channel, leaving the old channel as a distributary, the Chipola Cutoff, joining the Chipola River just below Dead Lake.

The flow through the Chipola Cutoff is high enough to restrict outflow from Dead Lake, helping to maintain higher water levels in the lake. When the Apalachicola River floods, it can reverse the flow of the Chipola between the lower end of Dead Lake and the junction with the Chipola Cutoff, sending water into the lake. The Chipola River flows another 21 kilometres (13 mi) from the junction with the Chipola Cutoff to its junction with the Apalachicola River.

=== Dam ===
A sheetpile dam was constructed at the lower end of Dead Lake in 1960 to stabilize the lake at as high a level as possible. Sport fishing, which had been described as "excellent", declined considerably by the 1970s. Brazilian waterweed and common water hyacinth proliferated, interfering with access by fishermen. Lift gates were added to the dam in 1974 to allow for periodic drawdowns of the lake. Several attempts to draw down the lake in the 1970s were unsuccessful because of the poor design of the gates and high water levels in the Apalachicola River. Sports fishing improved less than had been anticipated from the drawdowns, and the sheetpile portion of the dam was removed in 1987. Boulders that had braced the sheetpiles were initially left in place, but blocked the river bed at low water levels, and were also removed in 1989. By 1993, the number of species of fish found in the lake had increased to 61 from 34 found before the dam was removed. Periodic low water levels led to a restoration of aquatic plants such as alligator weed and improved conditions in other areas used as spawning areas by game fish.

== Hydrology ==
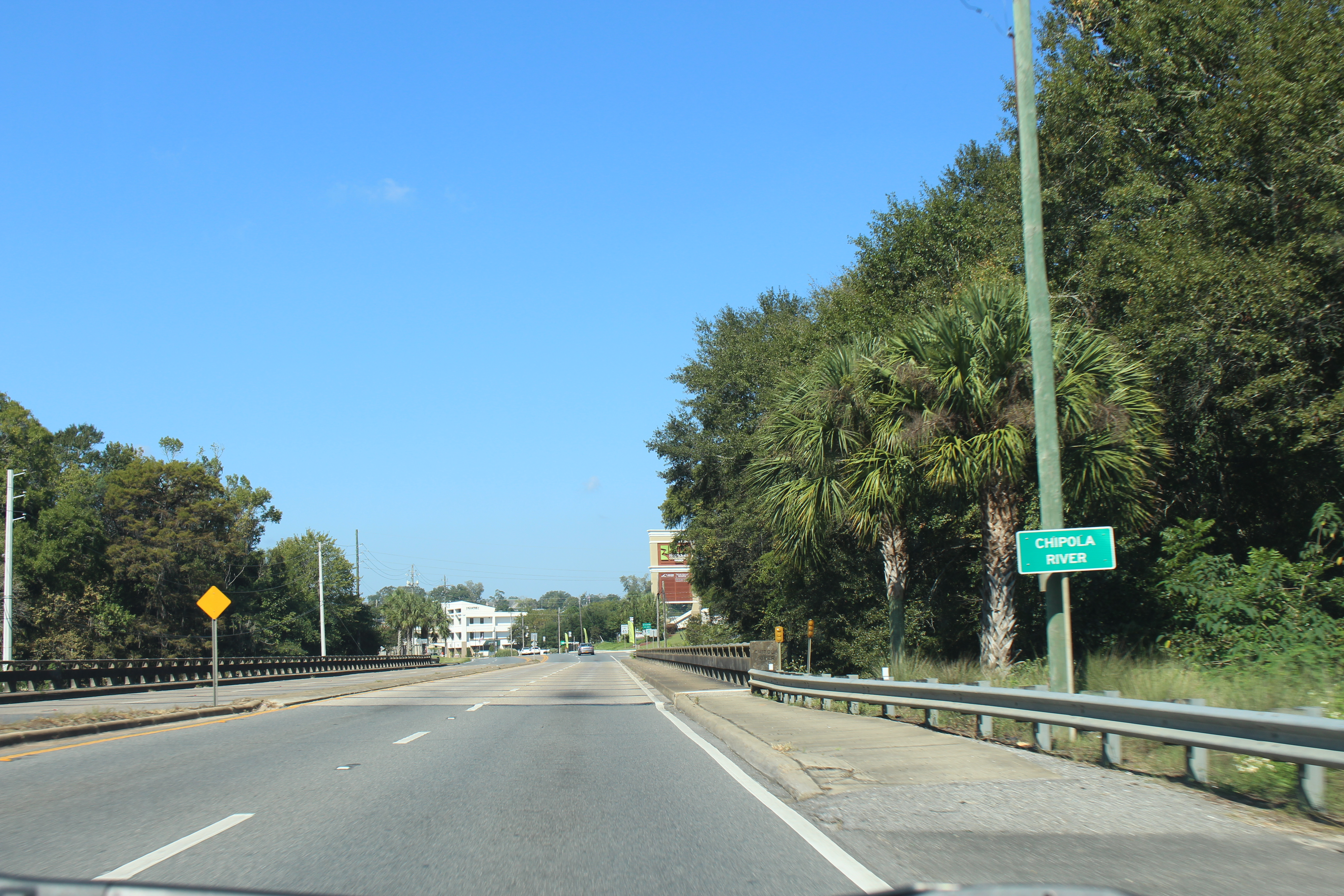
Chipola River crossing on US90/FL10 in Jackson County

The Floridan Aquifer underlies the Dougherty Karst Plain, and is recharged from surface water as well as discharging to springs and rivers on the plain. In the northernmost Chipola watershed the Floridan Aquifer is relatively thin at 30 metres (100 ft), consisting of just the Ocala Limestone. The aquifer thickens to the south, reaching about 700 feet (210 m) thickness at the southern edge of the Dougherty Karst Plain, with the younger Marianna, Suwannee, and Chattahoochee formations above the Ocala Limstone. The top of the Floridan Aquifer along the Chipola River is about 15 to 30 metres (50 to 100 ft) above sea level, and rocks of the formations making up the aquifer are often exposed in the bed of the river. The potentiometric surface of the aquifer is close to the ground level of the river's floodplain, indicating that water from the aquiver also contributes directly to the river's flow.

=== Basins ===
The Northwest Florida Water Management District has divided all but the northernmost part of the Chipola watershed into basins and sub-basins for the purposes of studying water quality, water supply, and natural aquatic habitat area. The Merritts Millpond-Chipola River basin, which includes Greenwood, parts of Jacob and Cottondale, and much of Marianna, is divided into the Waddells Mill Creek, Hayes Spring Run, Muddy Branch-Chipola River, Carters Mill Branch, and Merritts Millpond sub-basins, and has significant areas of water affected by pollution and algal mats and large numbers of assets subject to flooding. The Mill Creek-Chipola River basin, which includes Alford, the northern part of Altha, and the southern parts of Cottondale and Marianna, is divided into the Sapp Bay, Stump Creek, Upper Dry Creek-Chipola River, Lower Dry Creek-Chipola River, Foxworth Mill Creek, Douglas Pond, Rocky Creek-Chipola River, and Mill Creek-Chipola River sub-basins, and has limited areas of water affected by pollution and algal mats and a moderate number of assets subject to flooding.

The Chipola River-Tenmile Creek basin includes the southern part of Altha and is divided into the Upper Tenmile Creek, Lower Tenmile Creek, Fourmile Creek-Chipola River, Davis Creek, and Juniper Creek-Chipola River sub-basins and has significant areas of water impaired by bacteria and a moderate number of assets subject to flooding. The Dead Lakes basin includes Wewahitchka and is divided into the Old Camp Four Swamp, Cypress Creek-Dead Lakes, Upper Dead Lakes, Lower Dead Lakes, West Arm of the Dead Lakes, and Douglas Slough sub-basins, and has moderate areas of water affected by pollution and algal mats and a moderate number of assets subject to flooding. It is also at risk of storm surges.

=== Springs ===
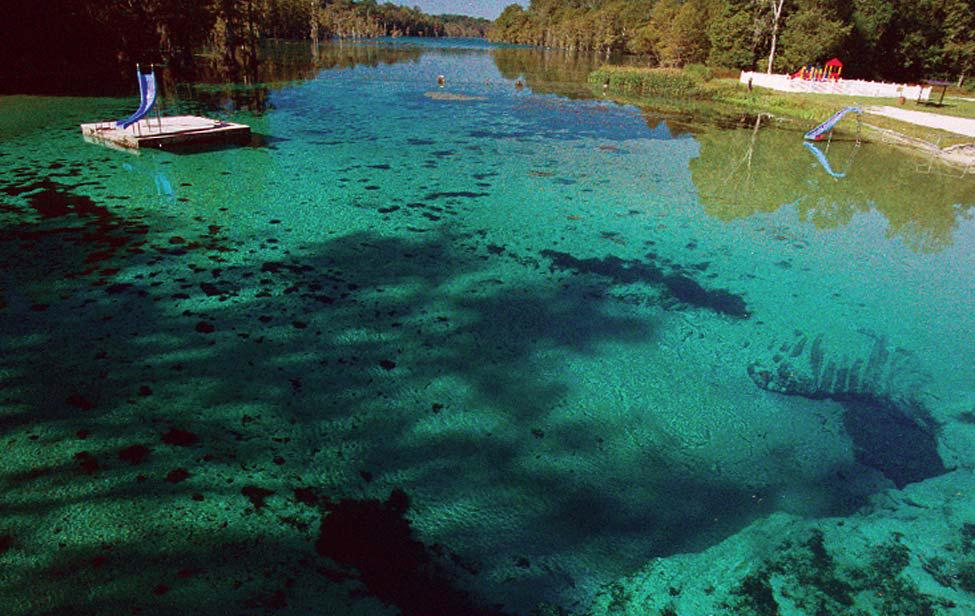
Jackson Blue Spring

A survey of springs in the Chipola River basin conducted in 2002/2003 identified 63 springs, all fed from the Floridan Aquifer in the Dougherty Karst District. Many of the springs are in or adjacent to the river bed, and are difficult to locate when flow rates are low. The Jackson Blue Spring is rated as a first-magnitude spring, nine springs are rated as second-magnitude, seven as third-magnitude, and five as fourth-magnitude. The outflow of some springs cannot be measured because they discharge directly into flow of the Chipola or one of its tributaries. Most of the flow of the Chipola River originates from the springs.

== History ==
The Chacato people lived in the upper Chipola valley when Spanish missionaries first reached the neighboring Apalachee Province in the 1630s. Two missions, San Carlos Borromeo and San Nicolás de Tolentino, were established in Chacato territory in present-day Jackson County in 1674, but were abandoned the next year after part of the Chacato people rebelled against the missionaries and then moved westward, and others sought refuge in Apalacheee Province.

Several towns developed along the river, among them Marianna and Wewahitcka. The Bellamy Bridge, north of Marianna, is the second-oldest bridge of steel-frame construction in Florida.

== Biota ==
Most of the banks of the Chipola River are covered by second-growth forest consisting of Carolina ash, maples, oaks, magnolias, dogwoods, and water tupelos. Invertebrates include the Dougherty Plain cave crayfish, freshwater snails, and freshwater mussels, such as the fat threeridge, listed as critically endangered, and the Chipola slabshell, listed as endangered, which is endemic to the Chipola River after populations in neighboring watersheds have disappeared. Projects protecting and restoring riverbanks along the Chipola are credited with increasing numbers of mussels in the river. Fish found in the Chipola River include the shoal bass, red-breasted sunfish, redear sunfish, bluegill, spotted sunfish, blacktail shiner, coastal shiner, weed shiner, and clear chub. Other animals include the Georgia blind salamander, Barbour's map turtle, rainbow snake, brown water snake, and banded water snake.

== Human use ==
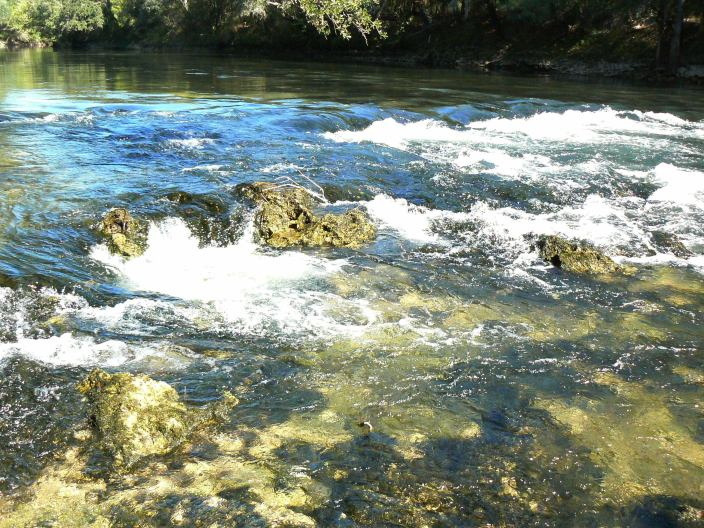
The rapids at Look and Tremble Falls

The 84-kilometre-long (52 mi) long Chipola River Paddling Trail runs from Florida Caverns State Park South to Scotts Ferry in Calhoun County. Several sections of the river may include fast water and moderate rapids, depending on the stage of the river. One notable section is Look and Tremble Falls.

A 0.5 mi (0.80 km) hiking trail provides access to the Bellamy Bridge ruins north of Marianna. The Hinson Conservation and Recreation Area in Marianna abuts the Chipola River.

The Chipola River Wildlife Management Area, also known as the Chipola River Water Management Area, consists of two tracts. The Jackson County tract includes land along Marshall Creek and Cowarts Creek and along the Chipola River from its origin at the junction of those Creeks to the northern boundary of Florida Caverns State Park. The Upper Chipola Recreational Trail system is located in the tract. The Altha tract is in Calhoun County. Both tracts have very limited access by road. Recreational opportunities in both tracts of the management area include hunting, fishing, boating, paddling, picnicking, hiking, primitive camping and wildlife viewing.

The Dead Lakes Park near Wewahitcha is operated by Gulf County.

== See also ==
- ACF River Basin
- Outstanding Florida Waters

== Sources ==
- Barrios, Kristopher; Chellette, Angela (July 2004). Chipola River Spring Inventory Jackson and Calhoun Counties, FL (PDF). Water Resources Special Report 04-01 (Report). Havana, Florida: Northwest Florida Water Management District.
- Bednarek, Angela T. (June 2001). "Undamming Rivers: A Review of the Ecological Impacts of Dam Removal". Environmental Management. 27 (6): 803–814. doi:10.1007/s002670010189. ISSN 0364-152X.
- Boning, Charles R. (2007). Florida's Rivers. Sarasota, Florida: Pineapple Press. ISBN 978-1-56164-400-1.
- Chapman, Bill (November 17, 2023). "Apalachicola Comeback". U.S. Fish & Wildlife Service.
- Clewell, Andre F. (1991). "Florida Rivers: The Physical Environment". In Livingston, Robert J. (ed.). The Rivers of Florida. New York: Springer-Verlag. pp. 17–30. ISBN 0-387-97363-X.
- Gilbert, J. T. (1892). In Paradise. A Trip to Chipola (Dead Lakes), Florida. Columbus, Georgia: Thomas Gilbert, Printer and Stationer.
- Hann, John H. (2006). The Native American World Beyond Apalachee. University Press of Florida. ISBN 9-780-8130-2982-5.
- Hill, Michael J.; Long, Eric A.; Hardin, Scott (1994). Effects of Dam Removal on Dead Lake, Chipola River, Florida (PDF). Proceedings of the Annual Conference of Southeastern Association of Fish and Wildlife Agencies. Vol. 48. Southeastern Association of Fish and Wildlife Agencies. pp. 512–523.
- Mattraw, H. C.; Elder, John F. (1984). Nutrient and Detritus Transport in the Apalachicola River, Florida. U.S. Geological Survey Water-Supply Paper 2196-C. U.S. Department of the Interior, Geological Survey.
- Mount-Douds, Beverly (2015). Images of America: Wewahitchka. Charleston, South Carolina: Arcadia Publishing. ISBN 978-1-4671-1406-6.
- Williams, Christopher P.; Scott, Thomas M.; Upchurch, Sam B. (2022). Florida Geomorphology Atlas (PDF). Special Publication 59 (Report). Tallahassee, Florida: Florida Geological Survey.
- The Chipola River Florida (PDF). National Park Service (Report). Atlanta, Georgia: Bureau of Outdoor Recreation Southeast Regional Office. August 1971.
- "Bellamy Bridge". Northwest Florida Water Management District.
- "Blue Springs Recreation Area". Jackson County, Florida.
- "Dead Lake". Florida Fish And Wildlife Conservation Commission.
- "Apalachicola River and Bay" (PDF). Northwest Florida Water Management District.
- "Florida Designated Paddling Trails: Chipola River" (PDF). Florida Department of Environmental Protection.
- "Hinson Conservation & Recreation Area". Visit Jackson County FLA. September 25, 2025.
- "Chipola River". Florida Fish And Wildlife Conservation Commission.
- "Chipola River Water Management Area". Northwest Florida Water Management District.
- "Dead Lakes Park". Visit Gulf County.
