= Lake Wimico and St. Joseph Canal and Railroad Company =

Early railroad in Florida

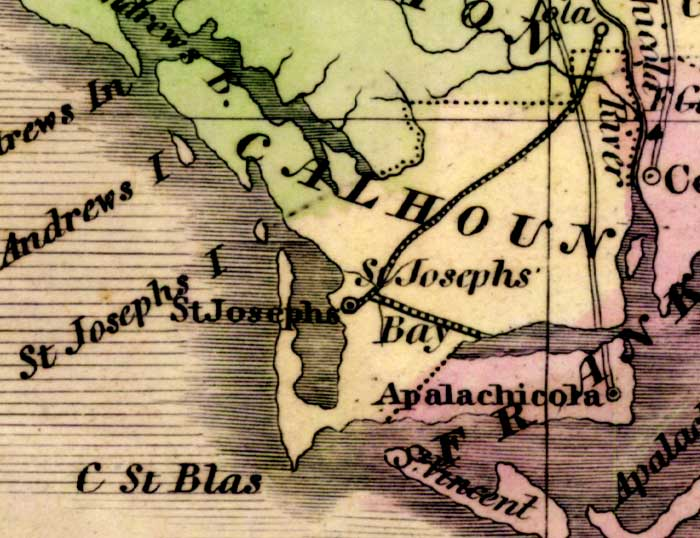
Map of the southern part of Calhoun County, Florida in 1842. This part of Calhoun County later became Gulf County. The map shows the towns of Apalachicola (in Franklin County) and St. Joseph (in Calhoun County), and the rail lines of the Lake Wimico and St. Joseph Railroad, running from St. Joseph to Lake Wimico (which is unlabeled) and from St. Joseph to the Apalachicola River at Iola,

The Lake Wimico and St. Joseph Canal and Railroad was the first steam railroad in Florida and one of the first in the U.S., opening in 1836. With the collapse of the town of St. Joseph, the railroad was abandoned by 1842.

The Lake Wimico and St. Joseph Canal Company was chartered by Legislative Council of the Territory of Florida in 1835, and was renamed in 1836 to the Lake Wimico and St. Joseph Canal and Railroad Company. Disputed land ownership had caused many residents of Apalachicola, the port at the mouth of the Apalachicola River, to start the new town of St. Joseph on St. Joseph Bay. The original plan was to dig a canal from the Apalachicola River to St. Joseph to allow steamboats to connect directly with ocean-going ships. Before excavation on the canal began, the company decided to instead build a railroad. Construction of the roadbed began in October, 1835, before the company's charter was modified to allow it to build a railroad. An 8-mile (13 km) long rail line to Columbus Bayou (renamed Depot Creek) on Lake Wimico was completed in March, 1836. Horses and mules hauled the first trains, but two steam locomotives were delivered later in the year, and became the first steam power used on a railroad in Florida.

Lake Wimico was connected to the Apalachicola River by the Jackson River. The success of the railroad was limited by difficulties steamboats faced in reaching the docks at Depot Creek. The Jackson River had many hazards to navigation, and Lake Wimico was often too shallow when water levels were low. To provide a better connection for the steamboats, a new rail line was built from St. Joseph to a point on the Apalachicola River near present-day Wewahitchka, 28 miles (45 km) from St. Joseph. Construction on the new line began in 1837, and was completed in October, 1839. The town of Iola was founded at the terminus of the railroad. Besides the railroad terminal and a couple of warehouses, Iola had a steam sawmill, a gristmill, a post office, and a hotel. A yellow fever epidemic devastated St.Joseph in 1841, drastically reducing the population and commerce of the city. A hurricane later that year destroyed the railroad's 1,500-foot (460 m) wharf at St. Joseph. The railroad went bankrupt and its movable equipment was auctioned off in 1842. Both St. Joseph and Iola were abandoned.

The railroad was constructed with a 5 ft (1,524 mm) track gauge, using wood rails with strap iron on top. The rail line extended onto a 1,500-foot (460 m) wharf in St.Joseph Bay, and onto docks at Depot Creek and Iola, to permit direct transfer of cargo between rail cars and shipping.

The West Florida and Alabama Railroad, incorporated in 1883, attempted to revive the roadbed, but it failed. In the 1920s the portion of the roadbed between Wewahitchka and White City in Gulf County became part of the Beeline Highway, a national auto trail, and now part of State Road 71. In 1910, the Apalachicola Northern Railroad used part of the old Lake Wimico and St. Joseph roadbed for a branch line to Port St.Joe.
