= Lake Wimico =

Lake in the state of Florida, United States

- Location within Florida
- Location: Gulf County, Florida
- Coordinates: 29°48′10″N 85°08′54″W
- Surface elevation: 0 ft (0 m)

Lake Wimico is a lake located near Port St. Joe in Gulf County, Florida, and connects through White City, Gulf County, Florida. The elevation is 0 feet (0 m).

The lake gave its name to the Lake Wimico and St. Joseph Canal and Railroad Company, the first steam railway in Florida which opened in 1836.
