= Dead Lakes Park =

Park in Florida, United States

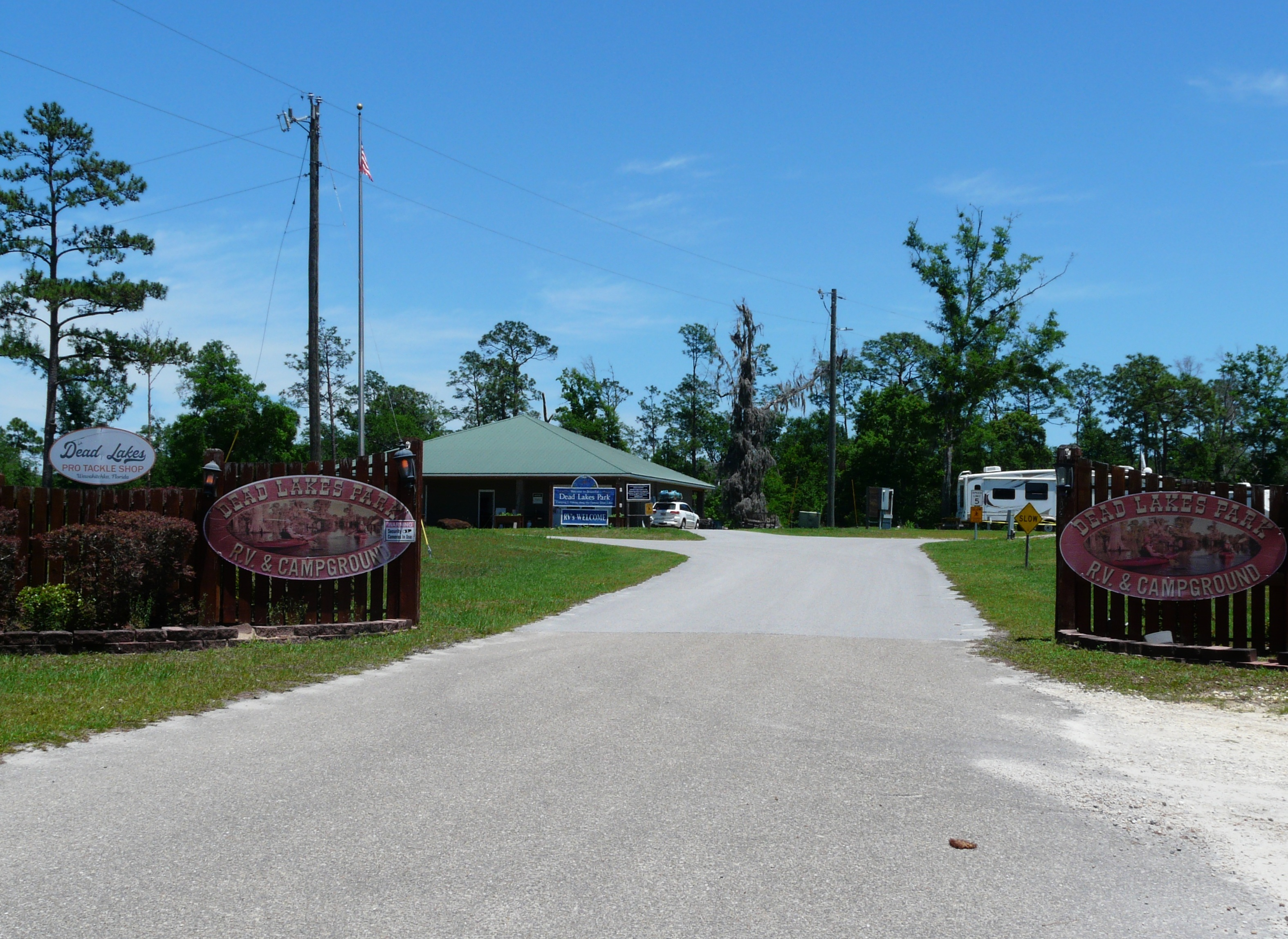
- Park entrance

- Location within Florida Location within the United States
- Location: Gulf County, Florida, US
- Nearest city: Wewahitchka, FL
- Coordinates: 30°08′22″N 85°12′02″W
- Area: 83 acres (34 ha)
- Governing body: Gulf County, Florida

Dead Lakes Park is a Gulf County park located 1 mile (1.6 km) north of Wewahitchka off Florida State Road 71.

== History ==
The land in the park was used as a fish hatchery by the Florida Fish and Wildlife Conservation Commission from 1936 until 1951. In 1974 the Florida Department of Natural Resources (now part of the Florida Department of Environmental Protection) sub-leased 83 acres (34 ha) of land for use as the Dead Lakes State Recreation Area. The recreation area was removed from the State Park System in 2003 and taken over by Gulf County. Initially called the Dead Lakes Recreation Area, as of 2014 it has been called Dead Lakes Park.

Activities include hiking, fishing, boating, camping, and wildlife viewing. Among the wildlife of the park are foxes, cotton rats, raccoons, opossums, white-tailed deer, rabbits, skunk, beavers, turtles, snakes and alligators. A variety of trees can be found in the park, including longleaf pine, magnolia and bald cypress trees. Amenities include a boat ramp, fishing pier, freshwater trails, and a camping area. The recreation area is open from sunrise until sunset.
