= Florida State Road 71 =

State highway in Florida, United States

State Road 71
- SR 71 highlighted in red

Route information
- Maintained by FDOT
- Length: 95.360 mi (153.467 km)

Major junctions
- South end: US 98 in Port St. Joe
- SR 22 in Wewahitchka; SR 20 in Blountstown; I-10 near Oakdale; US 90 near Marianna; SR 2 in Malone
- North end: SR 53 towards Dothan, AL

Location
- Country: United States
- State: Florida
- Counties: Gulf, Calhoun, Jackson

Highway system
- Florida State Highway System; Interstate; US; State; Former; Pre‑1945; Toll; Scenic
← SR 70	→ SR 72

State Road 71 (SR 71) is a highway in western Florida that runs 95.4 miles (153.5 km) from the Gulf Coast and the Gulf of Mexico, through the panhandle of Florida to the Alabama border.

== Route description ==
=== Gulf County ===
Starting at US 98 across from the intersection of Fifth Street in Port St. Joe as a four-lane divided highway named Cecil G. Costin Senior Boulevard, the road is within viewing distance of the Gulf of Mexico, where it runs east and west rather than the signed north and south route that it is. Along the way it encounters one of the two north ends of County Road 384. The road crosses a diagonal Apalachicola Northern Railroad line that has crossing gates in perfectly lined up with each other from both lanes, and as it curves towards the north it crosses another ANR railroad line. Between these two railroad lines, the surroundings become more rural as the road becomes a two-lane undivided route and southern pine trees surround it. The other north end of CR 384 is at an unmarked and gated dirt road. After crossing a bridge over the St. Joe Paper Company Fresh Water Canal, it serves as the eastern terminus of County Road 382 (Industrial Road), which runs parallel to the northwest side of SR 71 to US 98. The road maintains the same trajectory until it curves slightly to the left before crossing the Elgin Bayliss Bridge over Searcy Creek in White City, but still continues running northeast nevertheless. North of the community limits, the road passes by the Florida Division of Forestry's White City Fire Tower, and then has a shared intersection with the former County Road 50 (St. Joe Paper Company Road) and County Road 387 (Doc Whitfield Road). The road curves from northeast to northwest just before the County Road 381A (Lower Dalkeith Road) near Dalkeith and later has an intersection with County Road 381 (Willis Landing Road) in Gaskins Still. The eastern terminus of County Road 386 (Overstreet Road), is one more moderate intersection within rural Gulf County before State Road 71 runs north through the City of Wewahitchka, where it encounters the eastern terminus of State Road 22, but not before the intersection with its county extension, the western terminus of County Road 22 at Lakegrove Road. North of Wewahitchka, the road runs along the west side of the Dead Lakes State Recreation Area.

=== Calhoun County ===
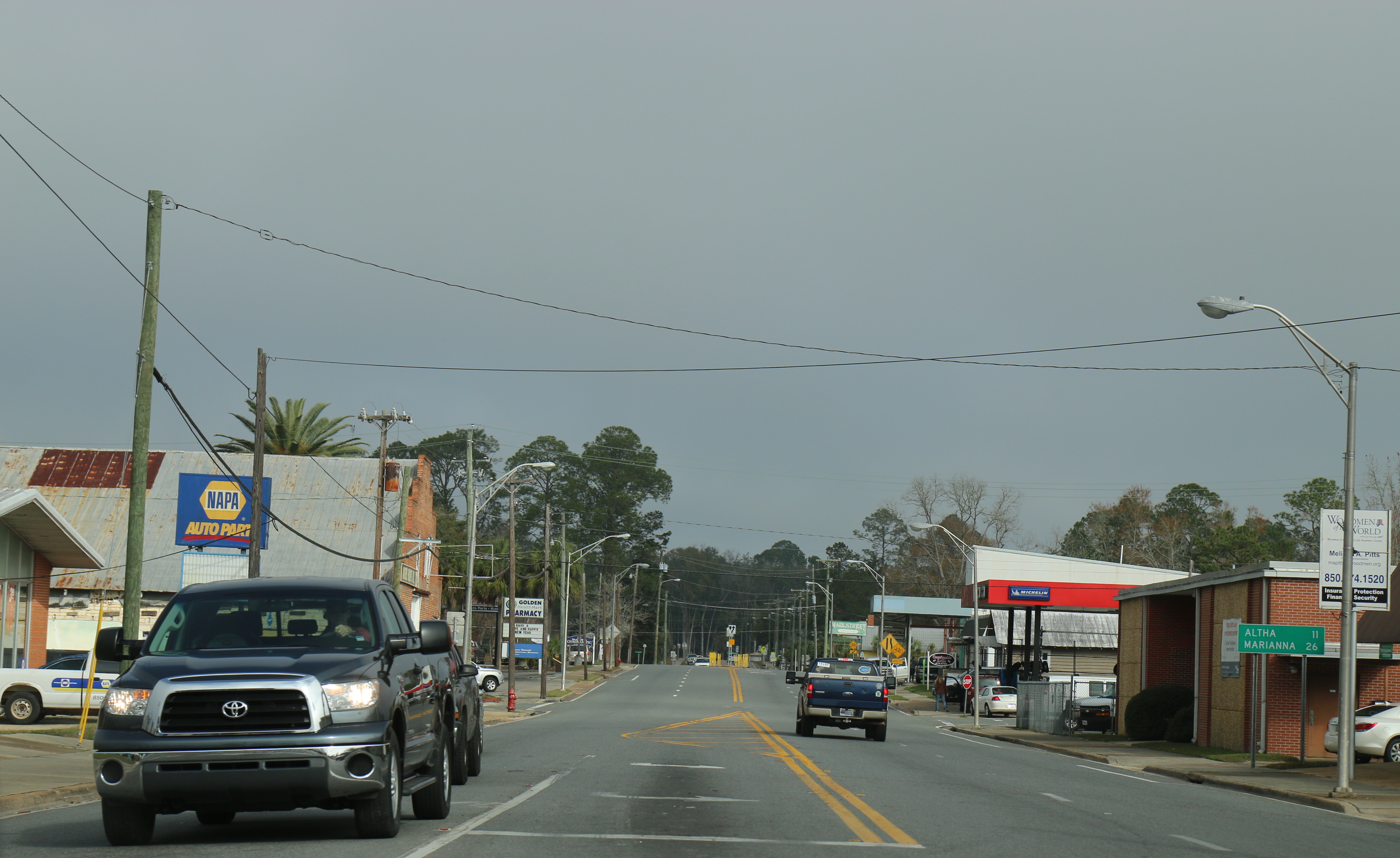
Looking north at Florida State Road 71 from SR 20 in Blountstown

Shortly after the intersections of South Rip Hall Pitts Road and Midway Park Drive, SR 71 crosses the Gulf-Calhoun County Line, where it passes by some random sod farms. In Chipola Park, SR 71 has two major intersections, the first being the southern terminus of State Road 73, and one block later County Road 73A, a suffixed spur of that route. The road then curves to the northeast and crosses the Sweet Water Bridge, then takes an even sharper curve to the northeast. from that point the road is lined with tree farms. After the intersection with CR 392, the road enters Scotts Ferry where it crosses a bridge over the Chipola River, and then turns straight north through Gaskins where it encounters County Road 275, and has a brief concurrency with CR 275 north of C.D. Clark Road. CR 275 later branches off to the northwest, and after this SR 71 turns northeast again. Later the road runs through Sharpstown and curves slightly towards the northwest only to turn back to the same angle it was at before as it crosses a bridge over Coon Creek and enters Flowers Still. Two streets merge with SR 71 on both sides; the eastern terminus of Barfield Road is across the street from the northern terminus of County Road 69 which leads to the Calhoun Correctional Institution, and is a de facto extension of a much more important route. One block later at the intersection of Chipola Road, the route enters the southwest corner of Blountstown, where it takes a sharper curve toward the east while crossing under a power line right-of-way and then over a bridge over Sutton Creek before merging with South Main Street where it turns straight north and south again. The road continues at this trajectory for three more blocks before intersecting the four corners of Blountstown at State Road 20 (Central Avenue), where South Main Street becomes North Main Street, and West Central Avenue becomes East Central Avenue. Two blocks north of there, North Main Street briefly becomes a divided two-lane highway where it crosses the Blountstown Greenway Bike Path, a rail trail that was once part of the Marianna and Blountstown Railroad. Three to four blocks north of the crossing it encounters the southern terminus of State Road 69, then SR 71 takes a sharp turn to the west. Beginning at Margaret Street, the road curves to the northwest and eventually meets the same rail trail it encountered earlier. From there, the road passes through Durham. A dirt road named John F. Bailey Road ends at Route 71, and then becomes part of this route. After intersecting another dirt road named Buddy Clemons Road and passing under the same power line ROW it crossed in southern Blountstown, the road makes a slight turn to the right where it passes by the Calhoun County Airport then runs through the community of Chipola. After serving as what would seem to be the northern terminus of CR 275, the road curves from northwest to northeast and then straight as it intersects Hanna Tower Road and enters Altha, where it resumes the name "North Main Street" from Blountstown. Further into town, the road has a one block concurrency with County Road 274 between Chipola Street and Main Street. Another segment of CR 275 can be found far east of here along CR 274. Upon leaving Altha, it shifts to the northwest once again. Near Mount Olive Cemetery Road, SR 71 runs through Cox where it later encounters the Farm Air Service Airport

=== Jackson County ===
State Road 71 crosses the Calhoun-Jackson County Line, and the first thing it does is encounter a curve to the right to avoid a fork in the road with a local dirt road before crossing a bridge over May Mill Creek. The first moderate intersection within the county is the south end of the concurrency with County Road 278 (Alliance Road), as SR 71/CR 278 crosses a bridge over Sink Creek before CR 278 breaks off to the west in Union City onto Peacock Bridge Road. SR 71 continues through Rock Creek, where it intersects the western terminus of County Road 264. North of the bridge over Rooky Creek, the road enters Simsville and passes by Sims Cemetery. The road continues to run to the northwest until it approaches, Oakdale where it turns straight north, and County Road 280 joins SR 71 in a concurrency between two roads: Rocky Creek Road to the east and Magnolia Road to the west. It is after the intersection with Magnolia Road that SR 71 once again becomes a four-lane divided highway, at which point a series of motels, restaurants, gas stations, travel centers and other accommodations begins to dot the landscape, serving as an indicator that this area is designed primarily for travelers from the nearby Interstate 10 (I-10), and sure enough, SR 71 finally comes to a standard diamond interchange with I-10 at exit 142. The same commercial development continues north past I-10, but the divided highway continues beyond the development area as SR 71 climbs a pair of bridges over Bridge Creek, and after passing by a sand and gravel yard, climbs above another pair of bridges over the CSX P&A Subdivision. The Old Spanish Trail intersects with SR 71 and then turns north in a concurrency with SR 71, and 0.2 miles later both join a concurrency with U.S. Route 90 in Florida where they turn left. US 90/SR 71 runs northwest and intersects three local streets before they dip to cross a bridge over Merrits Mill Pond. Then after passing a riverside RV Park, has several more local intersections before the overlap comes to an end. At the end of this concurrency, US 90 turns west along with the Old Spanish Trail toward Marianna, while SR 71 turns northeast at a wye intersection onto Greenwood Highway. The west leg of the wye does not come without some strings though, specifically the concurrency with CR 164 that runs as far west as the west end of the US 90/SR 73 concurrency. This concurrency is short-lived as it branches to the northeast towards Dellwood, Hornsdale, and Chattahoochee State Park in Alabama, while SR 71 curves north. Here the route enters a more residential area which follows it just before it approaches the northeastern terminus of State Road 166, a short connecting route that leads to Florida Caverns State Park, Chipola College, and then downtown Marianna. Shortly after this the road passes in front of an entrance to the Marianna Municipal Airport, which is also shared by a fire house for Jackson County Fire-Rescue, and the Sunland Training Center. The Greenwood Highway name eventually diminishes and the road adopts the name Bryan Street before entering Greenwood, which contains the northern terminus of State Road 69 which is shared with the eastern terminus of County Road 162, a bi-county road leading west toward Jacob City and Bonifay in Holmes County, Florida. Later the southern terminus of County Road 165 (Basswood Road), branches off to the northeast and takes motorists to the Town of Bascom. After leaving the Greenwood town limits, the road passes by two local airfields; the Acres of Diamonds Airpark and Chipola Airpark. Further north, it curves to the left and encounters the western terminus of another road to Bascom known as CR 164B (Hummingbird Road), which has no connection to County Road 164. The road then intersects a dirt road named Ford Road where it curves around a swamp named Baxter Bay and then enters the Town of Malone where it adopts the name 10th Street and intersects State Road 2. North of the Malone town limits, State Road 71 curves to the northwest as it passes by the Jackson County Correctional Institution. After the prison grounds it runs mostly through farmland and passes five more rural intersections before encountering another wetland area named Jordan Bay. The last intersection in the state is a private dirt road named Deerwood Drive, and two more parcels of farmland can be found on both side of the street before SR 71 ends at the Florida-Alabama state line, with the road continuing as Alabama State Route 53 just south of Grangeburg, Alabama. On the west side at the border, two private houses exist right next to each other in two different states.

== Major intersections ==
County	Location	mi	km	Destinations	Notes
Gulf	Port St. Joe	0.000	0.000	US 98 (Clifford C. Sims Parkway) – Apalachicola, Mexico Beach	
Gulf		4.528	7.287	CR 382 west	
Gulf		6.605	10.630	Osprey Road (SR 71F north)	
Gulf	White City	6.97	11.22	White City Bridge over Gulf Intracoastal Waterway	
Gulf		7.239	11.650	Pridgeon Road (SR 71F south)	
Gulf		9.284	14.941	CR 387 east (Doc Whitfield Road) – Howard Creek, Apalachicola River WEA, Gulf Forestry Camp	
Gulf		16.025	25.790	CR 381A east	
Gulf	Gaskins Still	18.986	30.555	CR 381 south	
Gulf		22.238	35.789	CR 386 south – Overstreet, Mexico Beach	
Gulf	Wewahitchka	24.058	38.718	Lake Grove Road (CR 22 east)	
Gulf	Wewahitchka	24.086	38.763	SR 22 west	
Calhoun	Chipola Park	32.882	52.918	SR 73 north – Clarksville	
Calhoun	Chipola Park	32.999	53.107	CR 73A east (Oak Grove Road)	
Calhoun	Scotts Ferry	38.023	61.192	CR 392 west	
Calhoun		40.613	65.360	CR 275 south (C.D. Clark Road)	
Calhoun		41.596	66.942	CR 275 north	
Calhoun		50.071	80.581	CR 69 south – Calhoun Correctional Institution	
Calhoun	Blountstown	51.399	82.719	SR 20 (Central Avenue) – Clarksville, Bristol	
Calhoun	Blountstown	51.897	83.520	SR 69 north – Grand Ridge	
Calhoun		59.851	96.321	CR 275 south	
Calhoun	Altha	62.692	100.893	CR 274 west (Chipola Street)	
Calhoun	Altha	62.750	100.986	CR 274 east (Broad Street)	
Jackson	Sink Creek	66.712	107.363	CR 278 east (Alliance Road)	
Jackson		67.001	107.828	CR 278 west (Peacock Bridge Road)	
Jackson	Rock Creek	68.805	110.731	CR 264 east (Suncrest Road)	
Jackson	Oakdale	73.150	117.724	CR 280 east (Rocky Creek Road)	
Jackson	Oakdale	73.411	118.144	Magnolia Road (CR 280 west)	
Jackson		73.91	118.95	I-10 (SR 8) – Pensacola, Tallahassee	Exit 142 (I-10)
Jackson		75.849	122.067	US 90 east (SR 10) – Grand Ridge, Tallahassee	South end of US 90 / SR 10 overlap
Jackson		77.491	124.710	US 90 west (SR 10) – Marianna, Pensacola	North end of US 90 / SR 10 overlap
Jackson		78.633	126.548	Blue Springs Road (CR 164 east) - Blue Springs Recreational Area	
Jackson		81.031	130.407	SR 166 west (Caverns Road) – Florida Caverns State Park, Federal Correctional Institution	
Jackson	Greenwood	85.112	136.974	SR 69 south / CR 162 west (Fort Road) – Two Egg, NFREC-Marianna Beef Unit and Bull Test	
Jackson	Greenwood	85.762	138.021	CR 165 north (Basswood Road) – Bascom	
Jackson		89.133	143.446	Hummingbird Road (CR 164B east) - Bascom	
Jackson	Malone	91.240	146.837	SR 2 (8th Avenue) – Campbellton, Donalsonville	
Jackson		95.360	153.467	SR 53 north – Dothan	Alabama state line
1.000 mi = 1.609 km; 1.000 km = 0.621 mi: Concurrency terminus

== County Road 71A ==
County Road 71A
- Location: East of Port Saint Joe

County Road 71A is the sole suffixed route of SR 71. It is a dead end street known as "Chemical Road" which runs south from SR 71 across from the intersection with Avenue A east of Port St. Joe between the two railroad crossings.
