= Old Gulf County Courthouse =

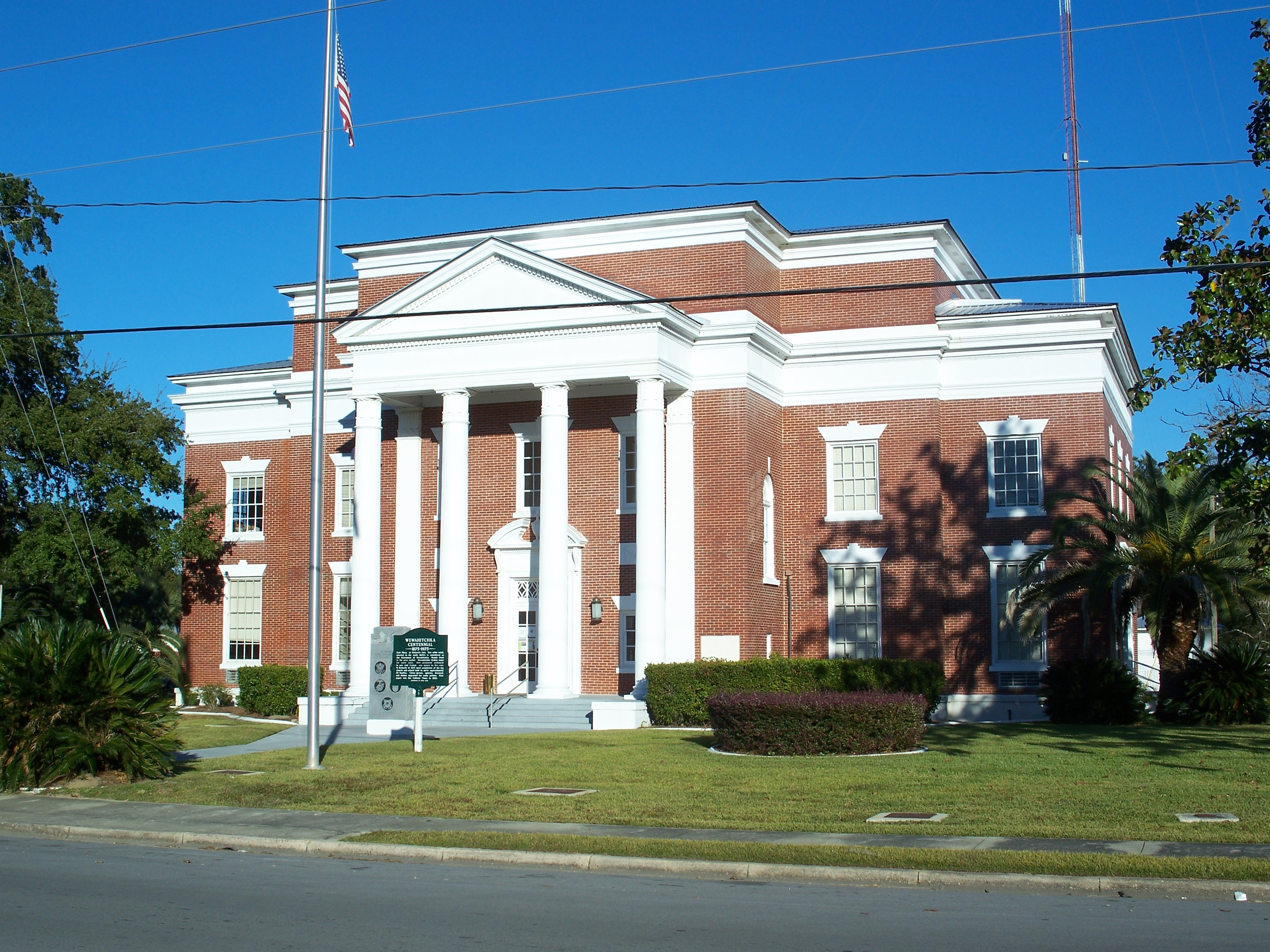
- Old Gulf County Courthouse
- Interactive map of the Old Gulf County Courthouse area

General information
- Architectural style: Classical Revival
- Location: Wewahitchka, Florida, United States
- Coordinates: 30°6′54″N 85°11′56″W
- Completed: 1927
- Cost: $
- Client: Gulf County

Design and construction
- Architects: Warren, Knight & Davis of Birmingham, Alabama
- Engineer: Builder: H. H. Taylor

The Old Gulf County Courthouse is a historic redbrick courthouse building located at 222 North 2nd Street in Wewahitchka, Florida. It was built in 1927 in the Classical Revival style after Wewahitchka was designated the county seat of newly created Gulf County. In 1965 the county seat was moved to Port St. Joe and a new courthouse was built there. The old courthouse still functions as an auxiliary to the Port St. Joe courthouse.

In 1989, the Old Gulf County Courthouse was listed in A Guide to Florida's Historic Architecture, published by the University of Florida Press.
