= Northwest Regional Library System =

Coordinates: 30.1681°N 85.6729°W

The Northwest Regional Library System (NWRLS) is a public library system that serves Bay, Gulf, and Liberty Counties in Florida.

== History ==
The first library in Bay County was established in 1911. It was located in Lynn Haven. The library was created by 14 women who met under the name of the Lynn Haven Literary Club. Each of the 14 women donated one book and three magazines to start the library, meeting in different locations to share their love of books and reading. When their collection grew to over 500 volumes, they needed more space. In 1922 the McMullin family donated land and a building located at 9th Street and Ohio Avenue that would become the McMullin Library.

In 1961, the McMullin Library became part of the Northwest Regional Library System. In 1990, following a shortage of funds within the public library system, the city of Lynn Haven took over responsibility of the library, and it is no longer part of the Northwest Regional Library System. The library's name changed from the McMullin Library to the Lynn Haven Public Library to honor the change in ownership.

In January 1914, The Woman’s Club of Panama City formed the Library Association. The first library began with a personal donation of 1,500 books from a Mrs. West. That first library was housed in the Chamber of Commerce Building, bought with $3,500 that the members of the Woman's Club donated. On September 10, 1941, the building was repurposed solely as a library, and was renamed the Bay County Public Library.

In 1960 the soon-to-be Northwest Regional Library System consisted of the Bay County Public Library, a bookmobile, as well as the McMullin Library. Later that same year, in September, the Bay County Public Library became incorporated as the Bay County Public Library Association, Inc. In 1962 the Association purchased a second bookmobile, and together with Washington County, formed the Northwest Regional Library System.

The Bay County Library also moved to a new location in 1962, moving from Washington Park to the Christo Dime Store building on Harrison Avenue. Five years later, in 1967, the library would move once again, this time to a new building on the City Marina.

In the early to mid-sixties, Gulf, Calhoun, and Walton Counties joined the library system. Walton County withdrew from the system sometime during the 1970's. Liberty and Holmes Counties joined the library system in 1973 and 1974; the system now served six counties covering 3,946 square miles: Bay, Washington, Gulf, Calhoun, Liberty, and Holmes.

On February 6, 1978, the Springfield Public Library opened. Ann Robbins was the branch manager. The library contained 5,000 books with a small reference section, magazines, and a few reading tables. The building, renovated for the Library, was previously home to the Fire Department, Springfield Baptist Church, and Springfield City Hall. Later the library would share the building with the Health Department.

On February 16, 1992, the Springfield City Commission voted to leave the Library System and the Springfield Library became a city library. Several years later, the Springfield Library rejoined the Library System, but the staff remained city employees.

A public library for Panama City Beach was the goal of many civic-minded volunteers and hardworking city officials. The first official meeting of the Advisory Board of the Panama City Beach Public Library took place on October 3, 1978. The members Dan Russell, Jane Patton (NWRLS Director), Robert Young, Mildred Russell, Julian Bennett, Jim Johnson, and W.H. Kampbell elected Peggy McCabe chair and Joe Sitton co-chair. On October 20, 1978, Peggy McCabe announced the City of Panama City Beach had designated a parcel of city land at the corner of Firenzo and Highway 79 as the library site. A new library was built at Panama City Beach in the 1980s.

The people of Panama City Beach were requesting their own library. At first, the Northwest Regional Library System sent their bookmobile to the Beach and staffed it with a volunteer. Each day, an employee of the library would meet the staff member to assist in providing library service to the community. The Bookmobile service began in 1981.

In October 1978, a piece of land was designated on Highway 79 as the site of the future library. The City of Panama City Beach came to an agreement to pay the library's utility bill, which came to an estimated $3,000-$5,000 per year. The community then needed to raise the cost of construction, which was an estimated $200,000 for a building that was 5,000 square feet. The local community including schools, clubs, churches, community members, and businesses donated money toward the new library building. The community also asked for and received help from the annual snowbirds that visit Panama City Beach during the winter. Additionally, the Bay County Commission promised $20,000 for construction of the new building. The new library opened its doors in 1984. The library was renamed in 1994 for Dr. Robert L. Young in recognition of his contributions to the community.

In 1995, Hurricane Opal tore the roof off of the library. Library staff and directors were forced to pack up the books and store them until the roof could be repaired. The staff of the Panama City Beach Public Library was moved to the Bay County Public Library to work until the building was safe to inhabit. Over the years, the library at Panama City Beach continued to grow and enlarge its collection. More services were being offered than ever and patronage had exponentially increased.

It soon became apparent that a new building was needed to meet the needs of the growing community. The mayor of Panama City Beach, Gayle Oberst submitted a grant proposal for state funds to use in the construction of a new building. A new library committee was formed to help raise the remaining money needed for furnishings and construction. The chair of the new committee, Doug Gilmore, was also involved in the construction of the original library in Panama City Beach. Frank Walker became the branch manager in 2009.

The new library building was completed in April 2010, and the doors to the old library were permanently closed in May 2010. The new Panama City Beach Public Library opened at 12500 Hutchison Boulevard, Panama City Beach, Florida. The transition to the new building was accomplished with the help of library staff, volunteers, and Panama City Beach Road and Street Department personnel. On May 20, 2010, a new Friends of the Panama City Beach Public Library group was formed and is still in operation today. They are a valuable resource to the library.

The new Panama City Beach Public Library opened its doors on June 1, 2010. On June 01, 2011, the one-year anniversary of the new library was celebrated. Attendees included library staff, city officials, and over 400 patrons. Statistical data between the last year of the old library and the first year in the new building show dramatic increases in the use of the library's services. Books and other items checked out had increased by 41% and computer usage had increased by 55%. From the opening of the new library on June 1, 2010, to May 31, 2011, there were 3,342 new library cards given to patrons.

The new Panama City Beach, Florida has made a huge impact on the community past and present. It has one conference room and one study room. The library also has a computer lab, as well as numerous computers throughout the adult and juvenile sections. After temporarily closing to the public in March 2020, the Panama City Beach Public Library opened up for curbside-only hours in the summer of 2020, and then fully reopened to regular hours in December 2020. In 2021, a sea turtle statue commissioned by the City of Panama City Beach was placed on the porch of the library building as part of a series of public art throughout the city.

In 1986, the Calhoun County Public Library withdrew from the system. The Calhoun County Public Library created its own county-wide system, which currently consists of the Blountstown Public Library, Altha Public Library, Hugh Creek Park Public Library, Kinard Park Public Library, Mossy Pond Park Public Library, and Shelton's Park Public Library. The Calhoun County Library System subsequently joined the Panhandle Public Library Cooperative System in October 1992.

By 1992, three more counties withdrew from the system; Washington and Holmes county, and the Lynn Haven library. Holmes County would join Calhoun and Jackson County in the PPLCS.

== Programs and Services ==
Computers and Wi-Fi are available at all branches. Computer classes are offered at the Bay County Public Library. An Events Calendar can be found here.

The Bay County Public Library in Panama City, the Corinne Costin Gibson Memorial Public Library in Port St. Joe, and the Harrell Memorial Public Library in Bristol offer 3D printing services.

Meeting Rooms are available at several branches including, Bay County Public Library, Panama City Beach Library, Corinne Costin Gibson Memorial Library (Port St Joe), and Charles Whitehead Public Library (Wewahitchka).

The Literacy Department within the library system offers a free program to anyone 18 years of age or older who wishes to improve their English-speaking skills, English reading or writing skills, or who is studying for the GED exam or U.S. Citizenship test. The program allows for Literacy Students to work either one-on-one or in a group setting with staff or volunteer tutors.

Genealogy Search is provided at the Bay County Public Library and at the Corinne Costin Gibson Memorial Library.

All branches within the system have a bookstore.

== Branches ==
Bay County

- Bay County Public Library:

898 West 11th Street Panama City, FL 32401 Hours (CST): Mon-Wed- 9:00 AM- 7:00 PM, Thurs-Sat- 9:00 AM- 5:00 PM, Sun- CLOSED

- Panama City Beach Public Library

12500 Hutchison Boulevard Panama City Beach, FL 32407 Hours (CST): Mon-Wed- 9:00 AM- 6:00 PM, Thurs & Fri- 9:00 AM- 5:00 PM, Sat- 9:00 AM- 4:00 PM, Sun- CLOSED

- Parker Public Library

4710 Second Street Parker, FL 32404 Hours (CST): Mon-Wed- 10:00 AM- 5:00 PM, Thurs & Fri- CLOSED, Sat- 10:00 AM- 5:00 PM, Sun- CLOSED

Gulf County

- Corinne Costin Gibson Memorial Public Library

110 Library Drive Port Saint Joe, FL 32456 Hours (EST): Mon & Tues- 10:00 AM- 6:00 PM, Wed- CLOSED, Thurs- 10:00 AM- 6:00 PM, Fri & Sat- 10:00 AM- 2:00 PM, Sun- CLOSED

- Charles Whitehead Public Library

314 North Second Street Wewahitchka, FL 32465 Hours (CST): Mon & Tues- 9:00 AM- 5:00 PM, Wed- CLOSED, Thurs & Fri- 9:00 AM- 5:00 PM, Sat & Sun- CLOSED

Liberty County

- Harrell Memorial Public Library

13016 NW CR 12 Bristol, FL 32321 Hours (EST): Mon- CLOSED, Tues-Thurs- 9:00 AM- 6:00 PM, Fri- CLOSED, Sat- 9:00 AM- 1:00 PM Sun- CLOSED

- Jimmy Weaver Memorial Library

22149 NE State Road 20 Hosford, FL 32334 Hours (EST): Mon- CLOSED, Tues- 9:00 AM- 5:00 PM, Wed- CLOSED, Thurs- 9:00 AM- 5:00 PM, Fri- CLOSED, Sat- 9:00 AM- 1:00 PM, Sun- CLOSED

- Mobile Library

See the mobile library's website for more information.
