= Oak Grove, Gulf County, Florida =

Oak Grove, Florida
- Unincorporated community
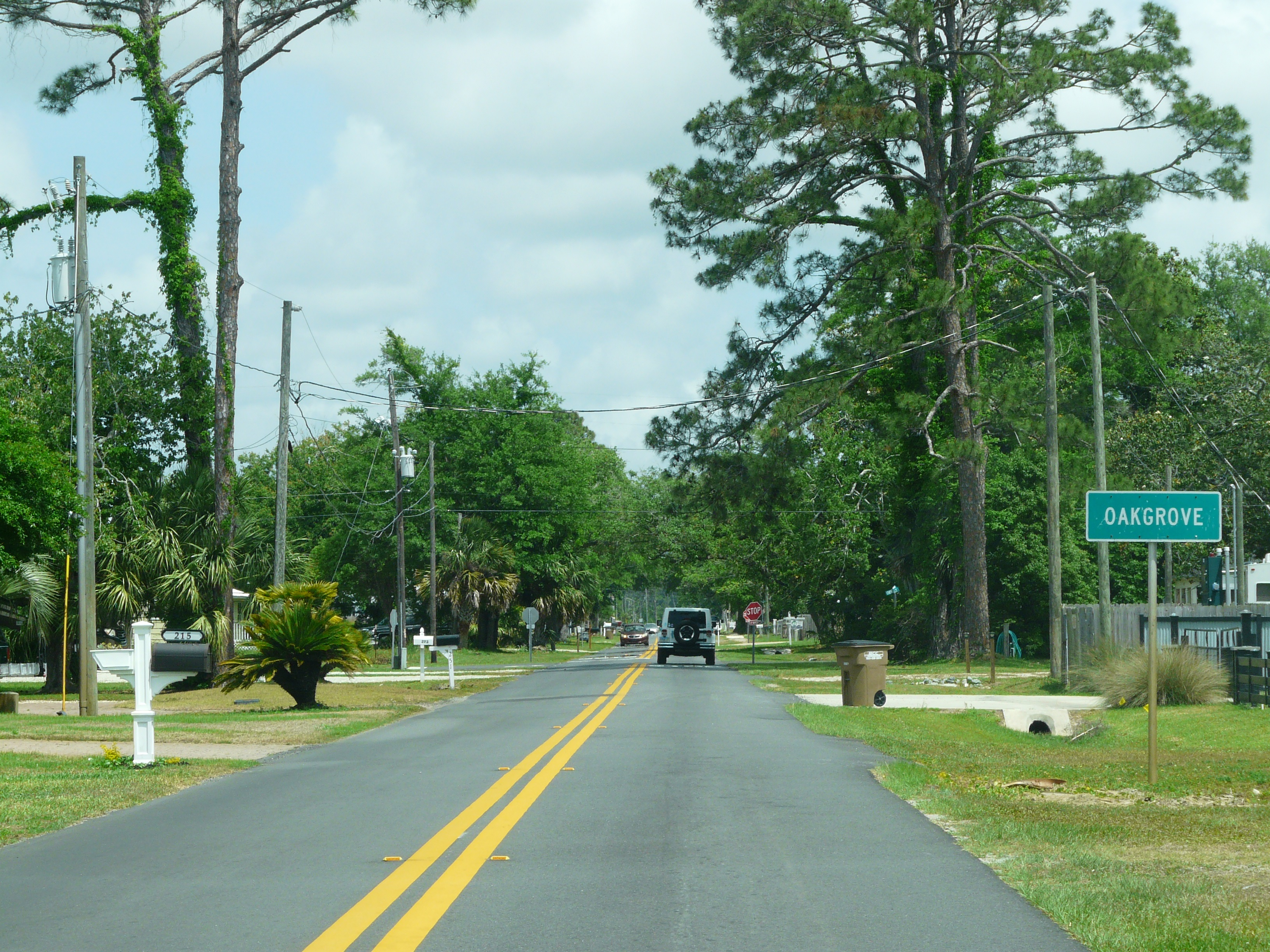
- Entering Oak Grove on CR-384

- Location within Florida
- Coordinates: 29°47′26″N 85°17′49″W
- Country: United States
- State: Florida
- County: Gulf
- Elevation: 10 ft (3.0 m)
- Time zone: UTC-5 (Eastern (EST))
  - Summer (DST): UTC-4 (EDT)
- Area code: 850
- GNIS feature ID: 287933

Oak Grove is an unincorporated community in Gulf County, Florida, United States.
