= Gaskins, Florida =

Unincorporated community in Florida, U.S.

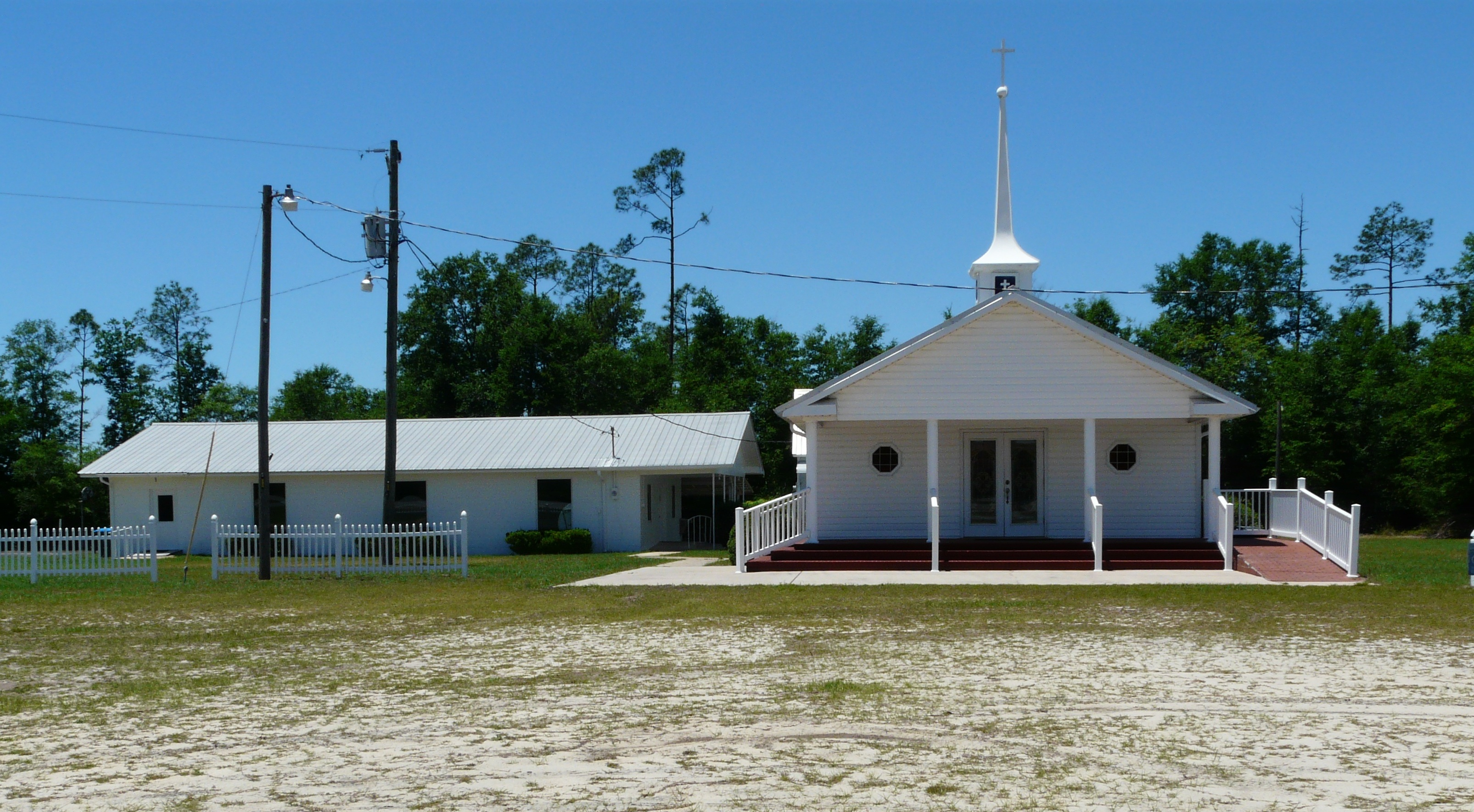
Williams Memorial Church in Gaskins

Gaskins is an unincorporated community in Calhoun County, Florida, United States. It is located on State Road 71.

== Geography ==
Gaskins is located at 30°18′20″N 85°07′36″W.
