= Neal's Landing =

Coordinates: 30.9747°N 85.0073°W

Neal's Landing is a recreational and historic site on the Chattahoochee River in the northern Florida panhandle area outside of Bascom, Florida by the Florida-Georgia state line several miles from the Alabama border. There is also a Neals Landing in Georgia just over the 91 bridge.

Neal's Landing is home to Neal's Landing Park and is used for fishing and camping. This site was the location of a former Indian village of Ekanchattee.

== History ==
During the 19th century, the steamboat paddlewheel Eagle caught fire in the area while making its way down the river from Columbus, Georgia to Apalachicola and several people died. Neal's Landing was the site of a deadly ferry disaster.
