= Highland View, Florida =

Unincorporated community in Florida, U.S.

Coordinates: 29°50′17″N 85°18′57″W

Highland View is an unincorporated community in Gulf County, Florida, United States. It is located on U.S. Route 98. It derives its name from the fact that eight feet above sealevel it is significantly higher than the neighboring town of Port St. Joe which is three feet above sea level.
