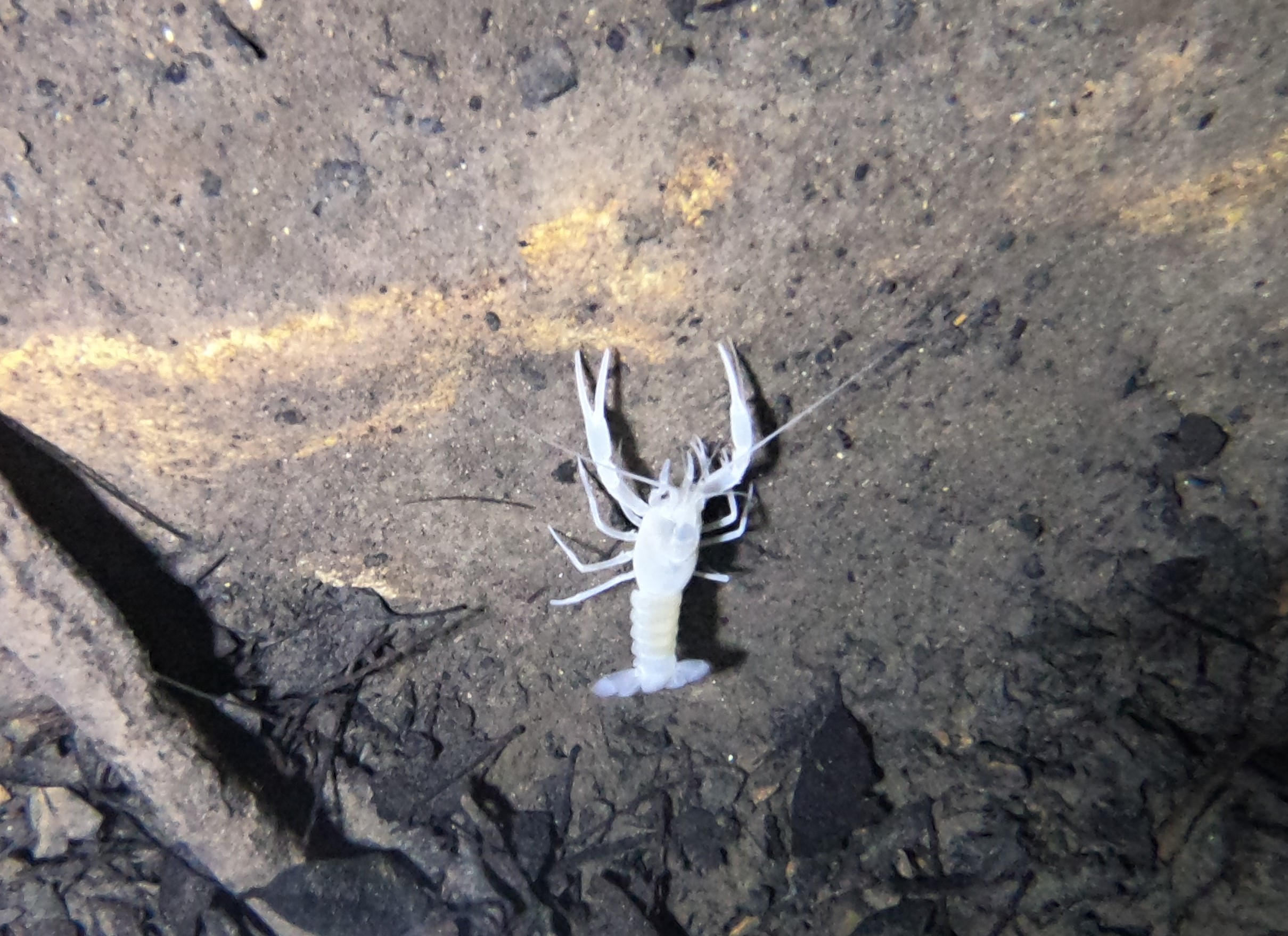

Conservation status
- Least Concern (IUCN 3.1)

Scientific classification
- Kingdom: Animalia
- Phylum: Arthropoda
- Class: Malacostraca
- Order: Decapoda
- Suborder: Pleocyemata
- Family: Cambaridae
- Genus: Cambarus
- Species: C. cryptodytes

Binomial name
- Cambarus cryptodytes Hobbs, 1941

= Cambarus cryptodytes =

Species of crayfish

Cambarus cryptodytes, the Dougherty Plain cave crayfish or Apalachicola cave crayfish, is a small, freshwater crayfish endemic to Florida and Georgia in the United States. It is an underground species known only from waters associated with the Floridan aquifer.

== Description ==
The Dougherty Plain cave crayfish grows to a length of about 53 millimetres (2.1 in) with antennae twice this length. It is a colourless species with unpigmented eyes, segmented cephalothorax and abdomen, a pair of slender chelae (claws) with a row or two of tubercles and long slender appendages. The rostrum is long and unadorned with tubercles or spines.

== Distribution ==
The Dougherty Plain cave crayfish is known from springs, wells and cave systems in the karst limestone region of Dougherty Plain in the Southeastern United States. It has been found in Dougherty County and Decatur County in Georgia and Jackson County and Washington County in Florida. It is likely also to be present in other Georgia counties which lie between the two presently-known ranges. A USGS survey of the area, carried out between September 2014 and August 2015, revealed additional sites in Early, Miller, Mitchell, and Seminole counties.

== Biology ==
Little is known of the biology of this crayfish. It is probably an opportunistic omnivorous scavenger and may feed on the Georgia blind salamander (Eurycea wallacei) which shares the same range. It has a low metabolic rate, perhaps associated with the limited availability of food, and consequently it is possible that it may live for twenty years or more. Males with ripe gonads have been found between July and October but females bearing eggs, juveniles or sub-adults have not been found in the wild. However, a full breeding cycle has been observed in captivity in the lab. This was the first breeding record for a troglomorphic crayfish.

== Status ==
In 1996 this species was listed as "Vulnerable" in the IUCN Red List of Threatened Species but following the discovery that its range is wider than originally thought, it was in 2010 recategorised as being of "Least concern" on the grounds that it has a broad range and is common within that range. It seems to be able to live in water with low oxygen levels and may be widespread in the aquifer away from locations that open to the surface. Potential threats include removal of water from the aquifer for human use and contamination of the water by pesticides and excess nutrients from agricultural operations.
