= Indian Pass, Florida =

Unincorporated community in Florida, United States

Coordinates: 29°41′26″N 85°15′52″W

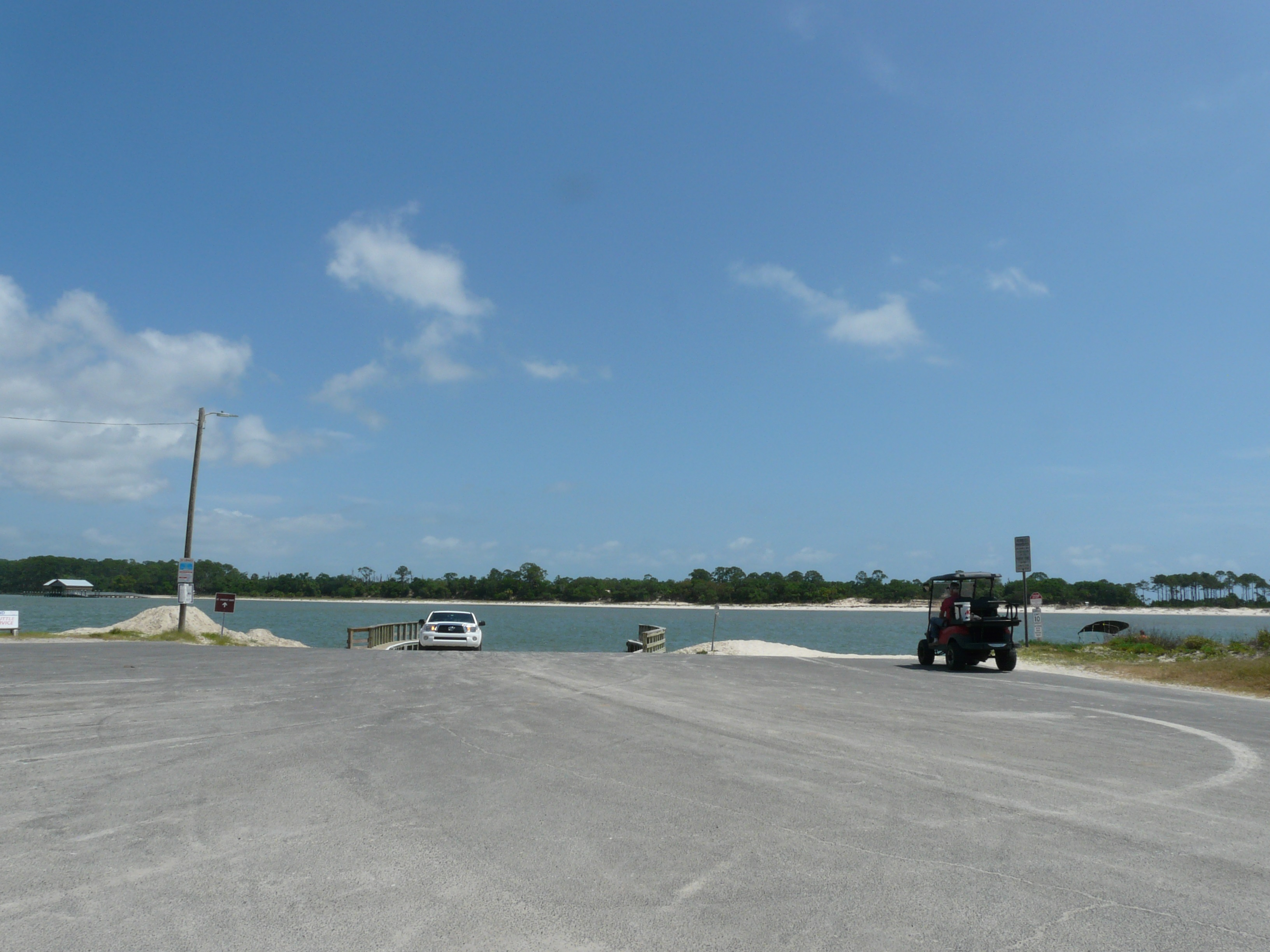
End of the road in Indian Pass

Indian Pass is a small area on the south coast of Gulf County, Florida, 8 miles south of Port St. Joe. It promotes itself as an uncrowded haven for sports fishermen and water enthusiasts, and for dining featuring locally caught oysters. A ferry provides access to a wildlife sanctuary on St Vincent Island. Indian Pass is commonly thought of as one of the last bastions of "Old Florida" living. The beach can be driven on here.

Indian Pass is located at 29°41'25" North, 85°15'51" West. The name refers to a natural pass leading from Apalachicola Bay to the Gulf of Mexico.
