= Scotts Ferry, Florida =

Unincorporated community in Florida, U.S.

- unincorporated community
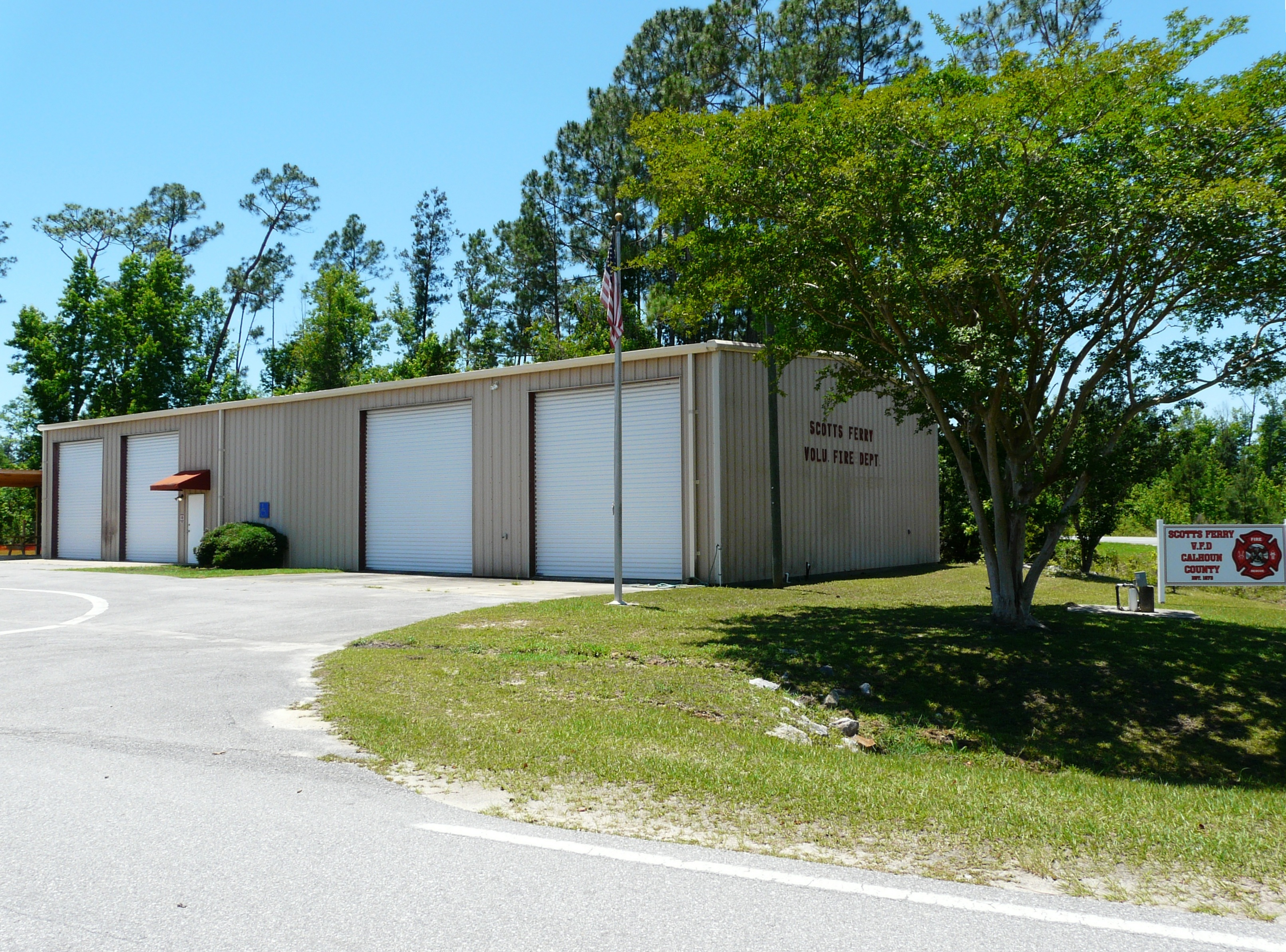
- Scotts Ferry Volunteer Fire Department
- Interactive map of Scotts Ferry, Florida
- Country: United States
- State: Florida

Scotts Ferry is an unincorporated community in Calhoun County, Florida, United States. It is located on State Road 71.

== Geography ==
Scotts Ferry is located at 30°17′43″N 85°07′54″W (30.2953, -85.1317). It was served by the Marianna and Blountstown Railroad.
