= Dalkeith, Florida =

Unincorporated community in Florida, U.S.

Coordinates: 30°00′21″N 85°09′15″W

Dalkeith is an unincorporated community in Gulf County, Florida, United States. It is located on State Road 71. Dalkeith's elevation is 23 feet.
