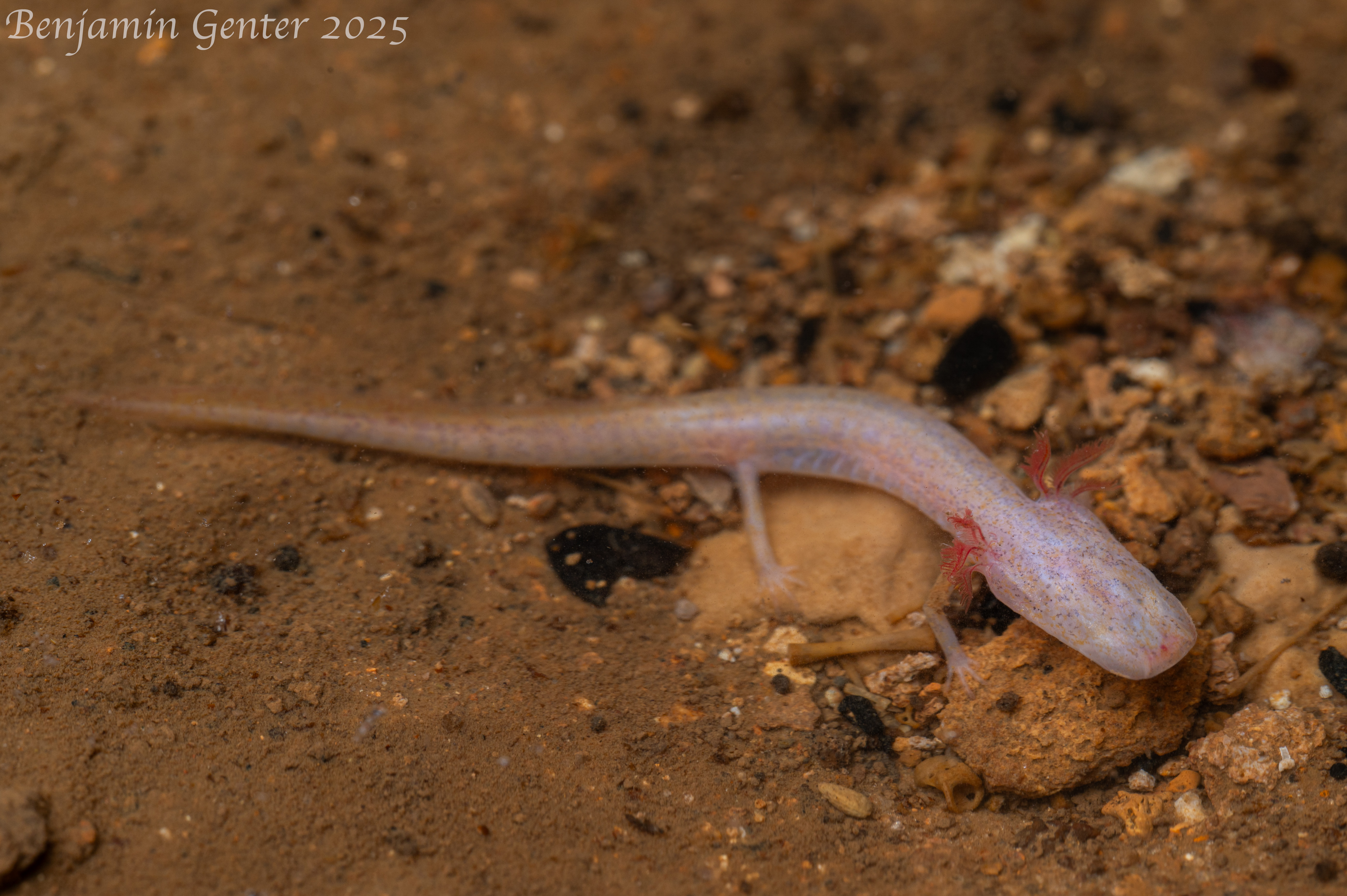
- Georgia Blind Salamander (Eurycea wallacei), Jackson County, Florida

Conservation status
- Endangered (IUCN 3.1)

- Critically Imperiled (NatureServe)

Scientific classification
- Kingdom: Animalia
- Phylum: Chordata
- Class: Amphibia
- Order: Urodela
- Family: Plethodontidae
- Genus: Eurycea
- Species: E. wallacei

Binomial name
- Eurycea wallacei (Carr, 1939)

Synonyms
- Haideotriton wallacei Carr, 1939

= Georgia blind salamander =

Species of amphibian

The Georgia blind salamander (Eurycea wallacei) is a species of salamander in the family Plethodontidae (the "lungless salamanders"). It is endemic to the south-eastern United States where its natural habitats are inland karsts, caves and subterranean habitats (other than caves). It is listed as "Endangered" by the IUCN and is threatened by habitat loss.

== Taxonomy ==
The Georgia blind salamander was originally described as a member of the monotypic genus Haideotriton, but was later placed in the genus Eurycea.

== Distribution ==
The Georgia blind salamander is found in underground habitats in the Southeastern United States. Its precise distribution is unknown, however the first specimen to be examined scientifically was discovered in 1939 in water pumped from a deep well in Albany, Georgia. The only other locality in Georgia from which it is known is the Climax Cave, near Climax, Georgia, in Decatur County. The salamander is also known from at least eight locations near Marianna in Jackson County, Florida. All these locations are connected to the Floridan aquifer, a vast system of underground water-filled passageways in limestone which underlies much of the Southeastern United States.

== Biology ==
Very little is known about the biology of this salamander. It feeds on ostracods, amphipods, isopods, copepods and other small aquatic prey. It frequents caverns where bats roost where bat droppings may fall into the water. Females with developing eggs have been found in May and November and it is thought that breeding may take place at any time of year. It appears to remain neotenic (breeding in its larval state) and no metamorphosised individuals have ever been found. The Dougherty Plain blind crayfish (Cambarus cryptodytes) is often found in the same habitat and may prey on the salamander, and fish such as the American eel (Anguilla rostrata), the brown bullhead (Ameiurus nebulosus) and the Redeye Chub (Notropis harperi) are also likely predators.

The eyes are extremely reduced, and are embedded in a mass of adipose tissue. Extrinsic eye muscles are absent, and the undifferentiated retina is lacking rods and cones, an outer plexiform layer, and a subdivided nuclear layer. In some individuals a rudimentary lens is present.

== Habitat and conservation ==
The locations in which the Georgia blind salamander are found are connected by the Floridan aquifer and it is presumed that it is by this means that populations are linked. The water is usually clear, but may become cloudy after heavy rain, and remains at 18 to 21 °C (64 to 70 °F) throughout the year. Two of the caves in which this species was found at one time have since been destroyed. Other caves in the Florida Caverns State Park are protected and in these, populations of the salamander seem stable. The IUCN considers this species vulnerable. Threats include pollution from agricultural activities and changes in the water table due to the extraction of water from the aquifer. There is a possibility that populations may be impacted by over-removal for scientific purpose or by collectors.

== See also ==
- Cave salamander
