= White City, Gulf County, Florida =

White City, Florida
- Unincorporated community
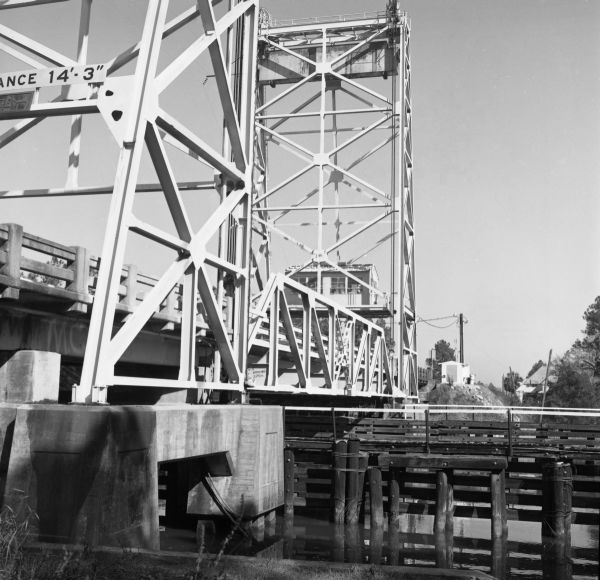
- White City Bridge over the Intracoastal Waterway, 1981

- Location within Florida Location within the United States
- Coordinates: 29°53′03″N 85°13′12″W
- Country: United States
- State: Florida
- County: Gulf
- Elevation: 7 ft (2.1 m)
- Time zone: UTC-6 (Central)
  - Summer (DST): UTC-5 (CDT)
- Area code: 850
- GNIS feature ID: 294969

White City is an unincorporated community in Gulf County, Florida, United States. White City is located on State Road 71, 7 miles (11 km) northeast of Port St. Joe.
