= Wewahitchka, Florida =

- City
- City of Wewahitchka
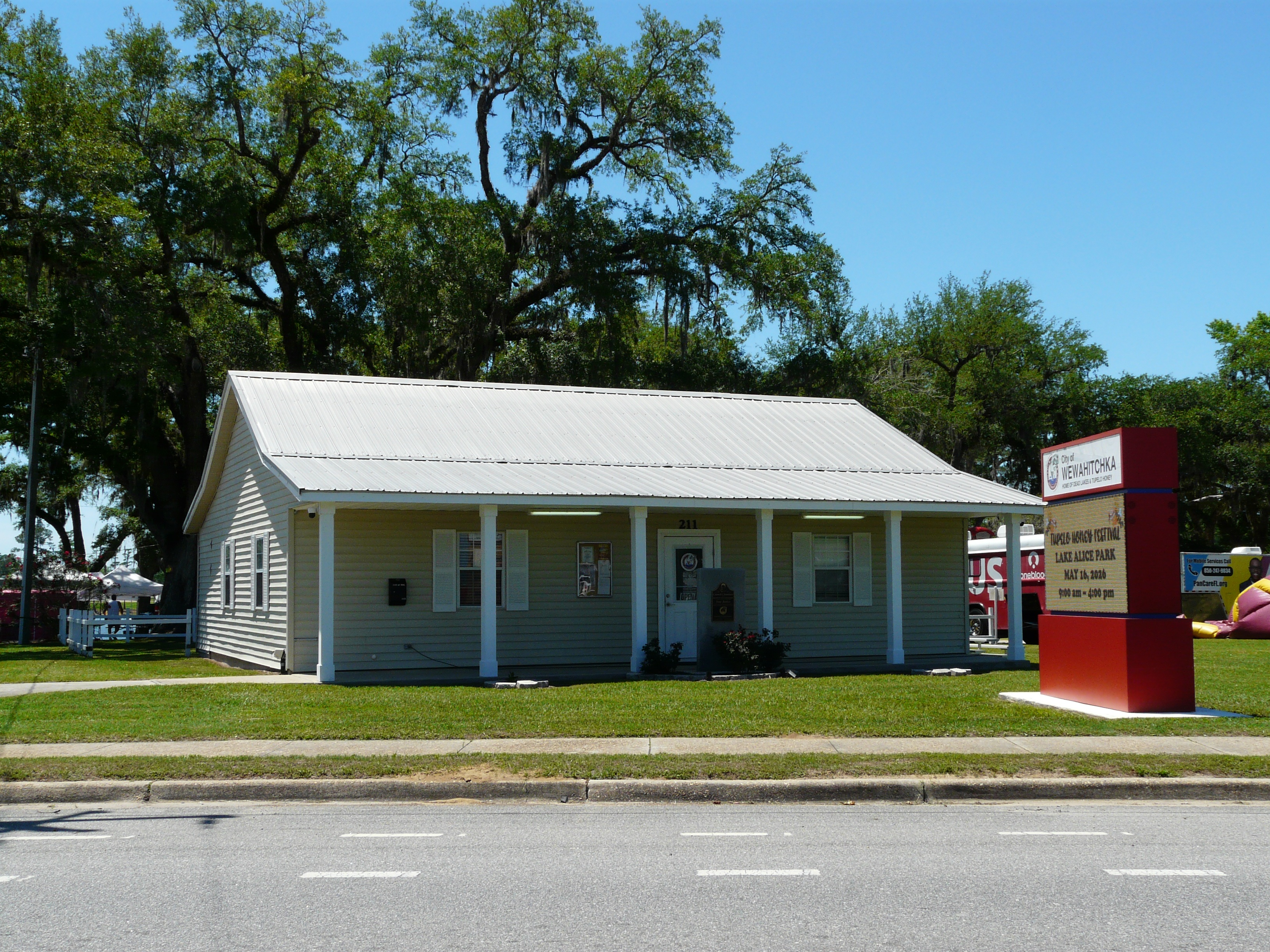
- Wewahitchka City Hall

- Seal
- Motto: "Home of Dead Lakes & Tupelo Honey"
- Location in Gulf County and the state of Florida
- Coordinates: 30°07′32″N 85°11′32″W
- Country: United States
- State: Florida
- County: Gulf
- Settled: c. 1870-1875
- Incorporated: 1959

Government
  - Type: Commission–Manager
  - Mayor: Phillip Gaskin
  - Commissioners: John "Johnny" Paul, Ralph M. Fisher, Brian Cox, and Charlie Pettis
  - City Manager: Michael Gortman
  - City Clerk: Rachel Jackson
  - City Attorney: Michelle Blankenship Jordan

Area
  - Total: 7.80 sq mi (20.20 km^{2})
  - Land: 6.70 sq mi (17.34 km^{2})
  - Water: 1.11 sq mi (2.87 km^{2})
- Elevation: 33 ft (10 m)

Population (2020)
  - Total: 2,074
  - Density: 309.9/sq mi (119.64/km^{2})
- Time zone: UTC-6 (Central (CST))
  - Summer (DST): UTC-5 (CDT)
- ZIP Code: 32465
- Area code(s): 850, 448
- FIPS code: 12-77100
- GNIS feature ID: 2405724
- Website: cityofwewahitchka.com

Wewahitchka is a city in Gulf County, Florida, United States. The population was 2,074 as of the 2020 census. From the creation of Gulf County in 1925 until 1965, it served as the county seat before the county seat was moved to Port St. Joe.

== History ==
The current city was settled around 1870, and platted in 1875. It took its name from a Native American (Seminole) word meaning "water eyes". Two lakes along the edge of town look like a perfect pair of eyes, one of the lakes is called Lake Julia, while the other one is Lake Alice.

The community was officially incorporated as the City of Wewahitchka, becoming a municipality in 1959.

== Geography ==
Wewahitchka is located in northeastern Gulf County at the junction of Florida State Roads 71 and 22. SR 71 leads north 27 miles (43 km) to Blountstown and south 24 miles (39 km) to Port St. Joe, while SR 22 leads west 28 miles (45 km) to Panama City.

According to the United States Census Bureau, Wewahitchka has a total area of 7.7 square miles (20.0 km^{2}), of which 6.5 square miles (16.8 km^{2}) is land and 1.2 square miles (3.2 km^{2}), or 15.80%, is water.

It is located west of the Chipola River, a tributary of the Apalachicola River, and southwest of Dead Lakes. The two "eye-shaped" lakes from which the city takes its Native American (Seminole) name from, are Lake Julia and Lake Alice. And Lake Shippey is also located at the bottom center of the city limits.

=== Climate ===
The climate in this area is characterized by hot, humid summers and generally mild winters. According to the Köppen climate classification, the City of Wewahitchka has a humid subtropical climate zone (Cfa).

Climate data for Wewahitchka, Florida, 1991–2020 normals, extremes 1901–present
Month	Jan	Feb	Mar	Apr	May	Jun	Jul	Aug	Sep	Oct	Nov	Dec	Year
Record high °F (°C)	85 (29)	86 (30)	93 (34)	93 (34)	99 (37)	104 (40)	105 (41)	101 (38)	99 (37)	98 (37)	93 (34)	87 (31)	105 (41)
Mean maximum °F (°C)	76.9 (24.9)	78.7 (25.9)	83.2 (28.4)	87.0 (30.6)	92.5 (33.6)	95.4 (35.2)	95.8 (35.4)	94.7 (34.8)	93.1 (33.9)	87.8 (31.0)	83.7 (28.7)	78.6 (25.9)	97.4 (36.3)
Mean daily maximum °F (°C)	63.1 (17.3)	66.5 (19.2)	72.2 (22.3)	78.1 (25.6)	84.9 (29.4)	88.4 (31.3)	89.4 (31.9)	89.0 (31.7)	86.1 (30.1)	79.7 (26.5)	71.5 (21.9)	65.3 (18.5)	77.9 (25.5)
Daily mean °F (°C)	51.4 (10.8)	54.9 (12.7)	60.5 (15.8)	66.2 (19.0)	73.5 (23.1)	78.8 (26.0)	80.6 (27.0)	80.4 (26.9)	77.0 (25.0)	68.7 (20.4)	59.4 (15.2)	53.8 (12.1)	67.1 (19.5)
Mean daily minimum °F (°C)	39.8 (4.3)	43.3 (6.3)	48.8 (9.3)	54.3 (12.4)	62.2 (16.8)	69.1 (20.6)	71.7 (22.1)	71.7 (22.1)	67.9 (19.9)	57.7 (14.3)	47.3 (8.5)	42.4 (5.8)	56.4 (13.5)
Mean minimum °F (°C)	23.9 (−4.5)	28.1 (−2.2)	32.8 (0.4)	40.5 (4.7)	49.6 (9.8)	62.0 (16.7)	67.7 (19.8)	66.7 (19.3)	58.2 (14.6)	42.0 (5.6)	31.5 (−0.3)	28.0 (−2.2)	22.3 (−5.4)
Record low °F (°C)	11 (−12)	15 (−9)	20 (−7)	34 (1)	35 (2)	45 (7)	56 (13)	60 (16)	41 (5)	30 (−1)	22 (−6)	11 (−12)	11 (−12)
Average precipitation inches (mm)	4.83 (123)	4.94 (125)	5.26 (134)	4.49 (114)	3.28 (83)	6.27 (159)	8.24 (209)	7.91 (201)	6.63 (168)	3.24 (82)	3.84 (98)	4.17 (106)	63.10 (1,603)
Average precipitation days (≥ 0.01 in)	9.0	8.6	7.4	7.1	6.7	13.4	16.7	16.5	11.2	6.3	6.7	8.3	117.9
Source: NOAA

== Demographics ==
Historical population
Census	Pop.	Note	%±
1930	584		—
1940	1,022		75.0%
1950	1,289		26.1%
1960	1,436		11.4%
1970	1,733		20.7%
1980	1,742		0.5%
1990	1,779		2.1%
2000	1,722		−3.2%
2010	1,981		15.0%
2020	2,074		4.7%
U.S. Decennial Census

=== Racial and ethnic composition ===
Wewahitchka racial composition (Hispanics excluded from racial categories) (NH = Non-Hispanic)
Race	Pop 2010	Pop 2020	% 2010	% 2020
White (NH)	1,712	1,772	86.42%	85.44%
Black or African American (NH)	165	148	8.33%	7.14%
Native American or Alaska Native (NH)	11	18	0.56%	0.87%
Asian (NH)	1	4	0.05%	0.19%
Pacific Islander or Native Hawaiian (NH)	0	0	0.00%	0.00%
Some other race (NH)	1	1	0.05%	0.05%
Two or more races/Multiracial (NH)	52	96	2.62%	4.63%
Hispanic or Latino (any race)	39	35	1.97%	1.69%
Total	1,981	2,074		

=== 2020 census ===
As of the 2020 census, Wewahitchka had a population of 2,074. The median age was 43.9 years. 22.3% of residents were under the age of 18 and 21.6% of residents were 65 years of age or older. For every 100 females there were 89.2 males, and for every 100 females age 18 and over there were 85.4 males age 18 and over.

0.0% of residents lived in urban areas, while 100.0% lived in rural areas.

There were 850 households in Wewahitchka, of which 30.4% had children under the age of 18 living in them. Of all households, 43.6% were married-couple households, 19.1% were households with a male householder and no spouse or partner present, and 30.7% were households with a female householder and no spouse or partner present. About 29.3% of all households were made up of individuals and 14.5% had someone living alone who was 65 years of age or older.

There were 1,036 housing units, of which 18.0% were vacant. The homeowner vacancy rate was 0.7% and the rental vacancy rate was 6.9%.

According to the 2020 American Community Survey 5-year estimates, there were 534 families residing in the city.

=== 2010 census ===
As of the 2010 United States census, there were 1,981 people, 878 households, and 609 families residing in the city.

=== 2000 census ===
As of the census of 2000, there were 1,722 people, 696 households, and 483 families residing in the city. The population density was 277.4 inhabitants per square mile (107.1/km^{2}). There were 894 housing units at an average density of 144.0 per square mile (55.6/km^{2}). The racial makeup of the city was 89.61% White, 7.55% African American, 7.64% Native American, 0.75% Asian, 0.17% Pacific Islander, and 1.28% from two or more races. Hispanic or Latino of any race were 1.05% of the population.

In 2000, there were 696 households, out of which 29.2% had children under the age of 18 living with them, 49.4% were married couples living together, 15.4% had a female householder with no husband present, and 30.6% were non-families. 28.6% of all households were made up of individuals, and 13.9% had someone living alone who was 65 years of age or older. The average household size was 2.47 and the average family size was 3.01.

In 2000, in the city, the population was spread out, with 26.8% under the age of 18, 7.4% from 18 to 24, 24.0% from 25 to 44, 25.0% from 45 to 64, and 16.8% who were 65 years of age or older. The median age was 39 years. For every 100 females, there were 90.7 males. For every 100 females age 18 and over, there were 85.7 males.

In 2000, the median income for a household in the city was $25,755, and the median income for a family was $32,935. Males had a median income of $26,023 versus $19,886 for females. The per capita income for the city was $13,731. About 16.6% of families and 19.2% of the population were below the poverty line, including 24.3% of those under age 18 and 17.6% of those age 65 or over.

== Government and infrastructure ==
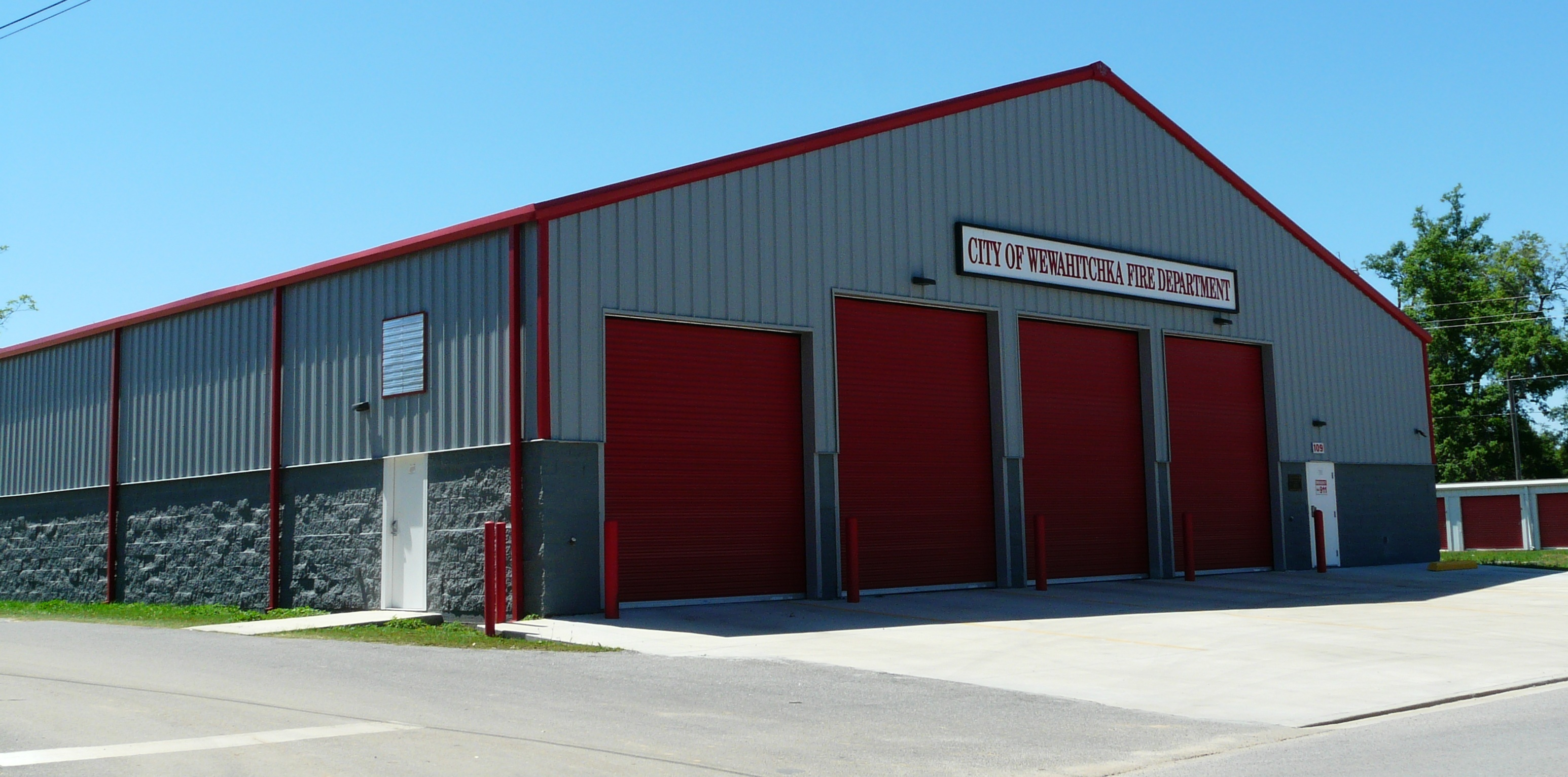
Fire station

The current fire station opened in 2025. The project was delayed as the city changed construction companies.

== Education ==
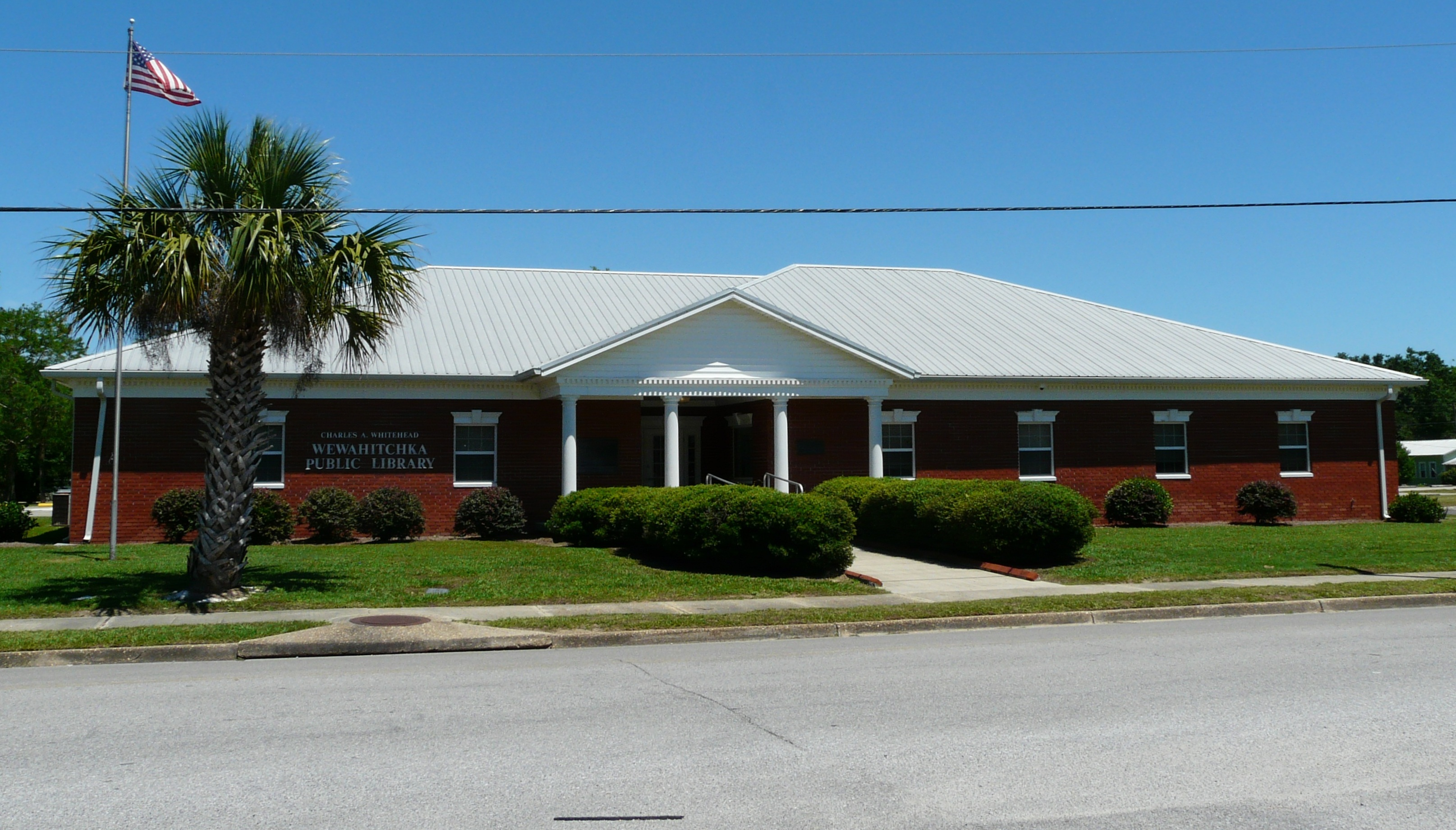
Charles Whitehead Public Library

Wewahitchka is home to two schools of Gulf District Schools: Wewahitchka Elementary School and Wewahitchka High School, whose mascots are the Gators. There is a Head Start program at the old elementary site.

The Northwest Regional Library System operates the Charles Whitehead Public Library.

== Tupelo honey ==
Wewahitchka is the site of one of Florida's largest beekeeping operations, which was the setting for Ulee's Gold, a movie filmed in the area. This honey is produced by placing beehives, known by the beekeepers as "Bee Boxes", in the swamps along the Apalachicola and other area rivers. In some areas the bees are placed on platforms and rafts to keep them above potential floods. Prior to the tupelo bloom, all earlier season honeys are stripped from the bees to avoid contamination with lesser grades produced earlier. Likewise, as soon as bloom is finished, the honey must be removed quickly before the bees have a chance to add other types of nectar. Wewahitchka has a two-day Tupelo Honey festival each May.

== Gallery ==
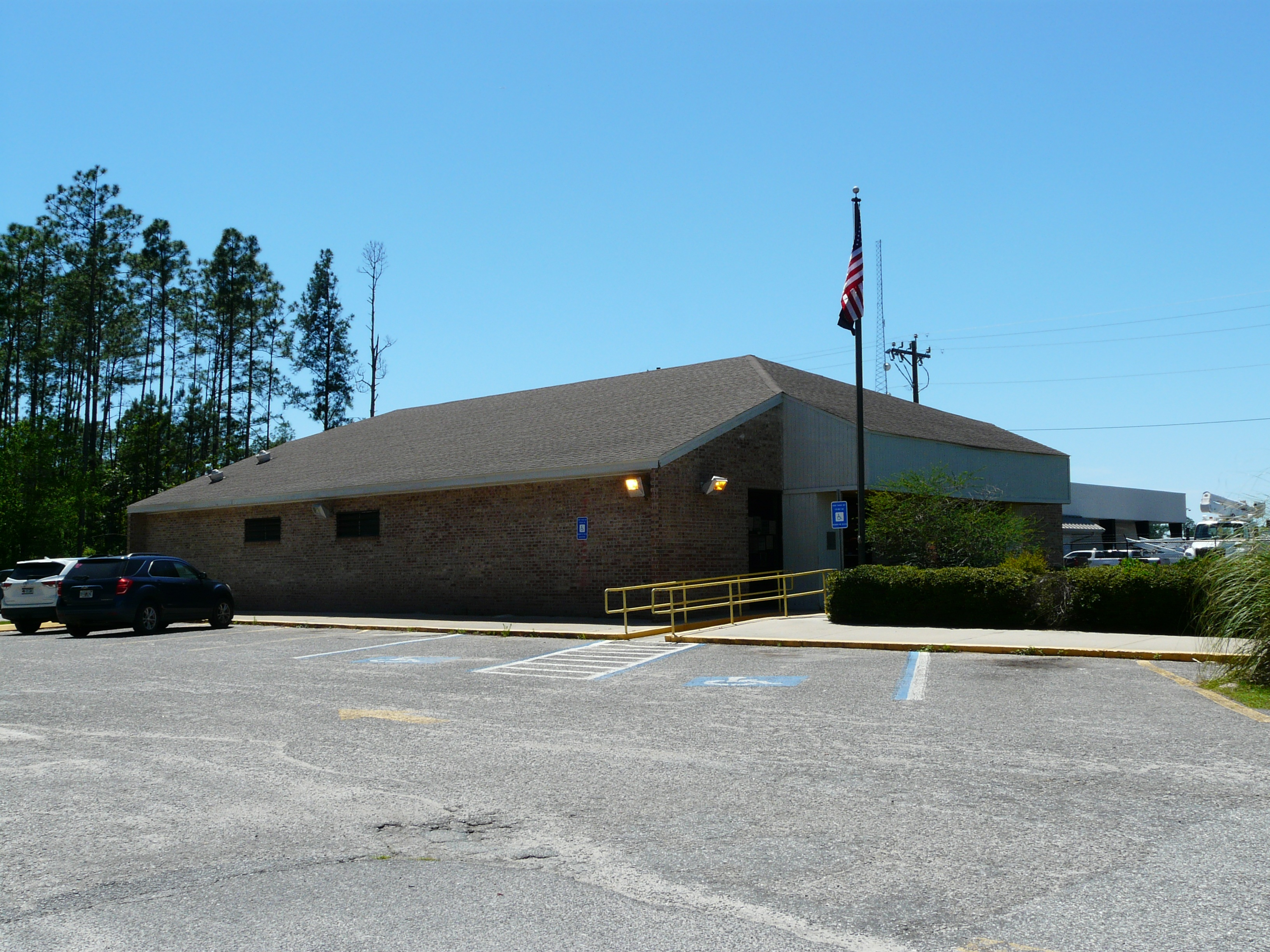
Post office
