= Gulf County, Florida =

County in Florida, United States

- County
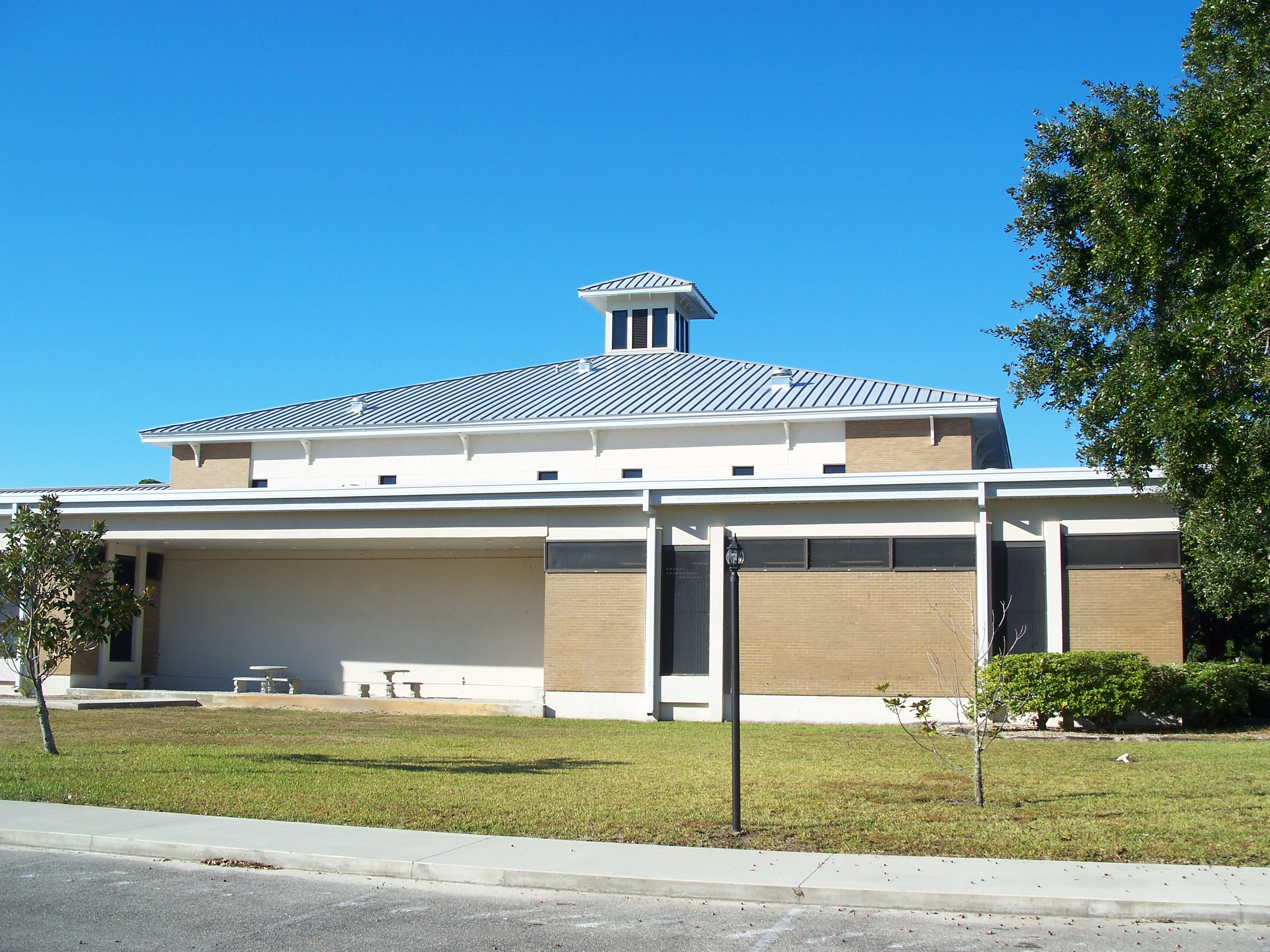
- Gulf County Courthouse

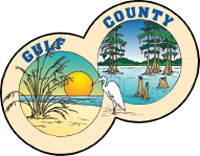
- Seal

- Location within the U.S. state of Florida
- Coordinates: 29°54′N 85°14′W
- Country: United States
- State: Florida
- Founded: June 6, 1925
- Named for: Gulf of Mexico
- Seat: Port St. Joe
- Largest city: Port St. Joe

Government
  - County Administrator: Michael Hammond

Area
  - Total: 756 sq mi (1,960 km^{2})
  - Land: 564 sq mi (1,460 km^{2})
  - Water: 192 sq mi (500 km^{2}) 25.4%

Population (2020)
  - Total: 14,192
  - Estimate (2025): 15,943 ▲
  - Density: 25.2/sq mi (9.72/km^{2})

Time zones
- Southern portion: UTC−5 (Eastern)
  - Summer (DST): UTC−4 (EDT)
- Northern portion: UTC−6 (Central)
  - Summer (DST): UTC−5 (CDT)
- Congressional district: 2nd
- Website: www.gulfcounty-fl.gov

Gulf County is a county located in the panhandle of the U.S. state of Florida. As of the 2020 census, the population was 14,192. Its county seat is Port St. Joe. Gulf County is included in the Panama City, FL Metropolitan Statistical Area.

== History ==
Gulf County, created in 1925, was named for the Gulf of Mexico. Wewahitchka was its first county seat and the 1927 Gulf County Courthouse is still in existence. In 1965 the county seat was moved to Port Saint Joe, which under its original name Saint Joseph, had been the site of Florida's first Constitutional Convention in 1838.

In 2018, Category 5 Hurricane Michael made landfall just miles north of the county line in Mexico Beach, severely damaging large parts of the region and its timber and shellfish industries. The area has largely recovered in the years since.

== Geography ==
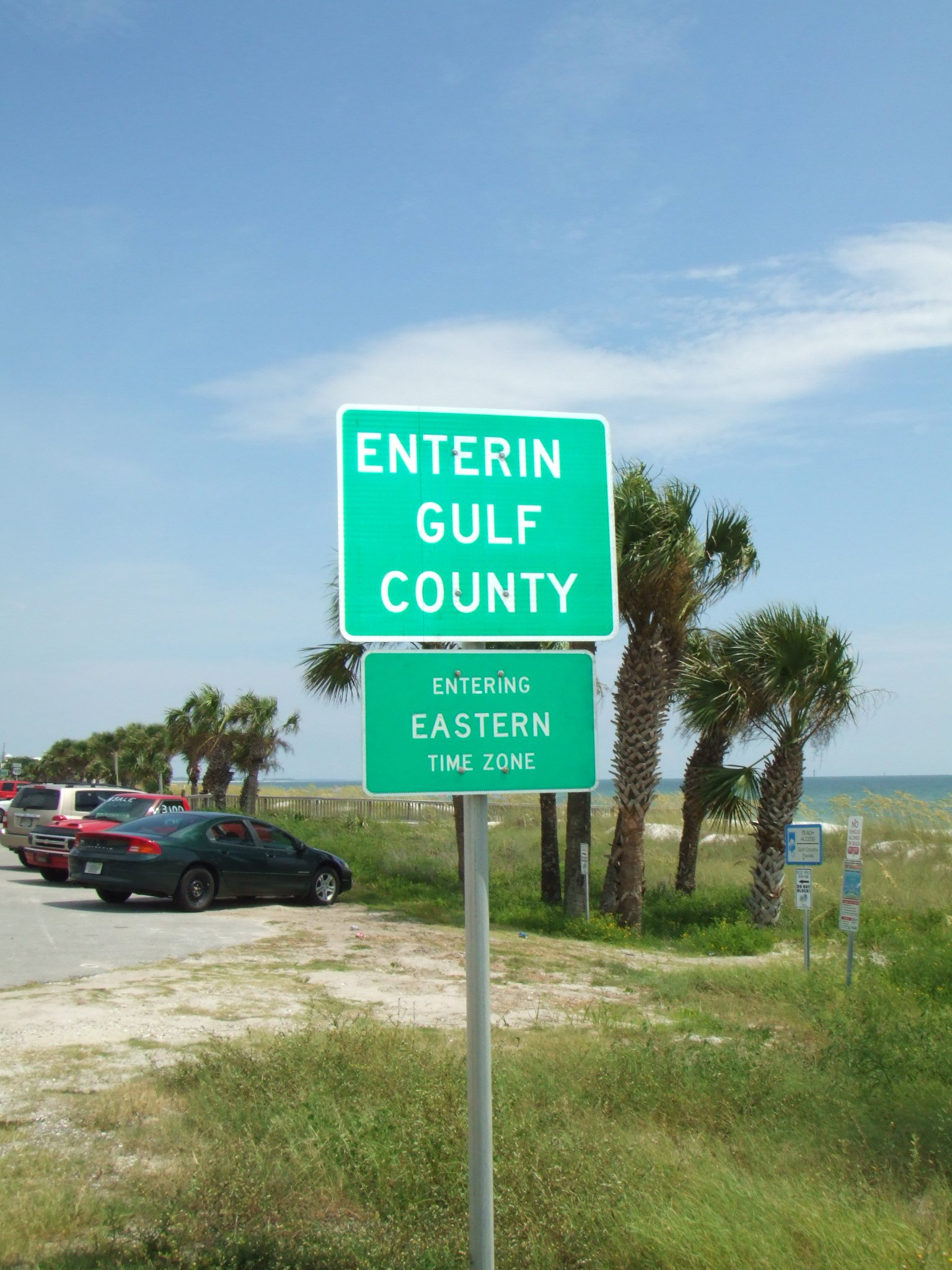
Entering the Eastern Time Zone

According to the U.S. Census Bureau, the county has a total area of 756 square miles (1,960 km^{2}), of which 564 square miles (1,460 km^{2}) is land and 192 square miles (500 km^{2}) (25.4%) is water.

=== Communities ===
==== Cities ====
- Port St. Joe
- Wewahitchka

==== Unincorporated communities ====
Unincorporated areas include:

- Cape San Blas
- Dalkeith
- Highland View
- Honeyville
- Howard Creek
- Indian Pass
- Oak Grove
- Overstreet
- St. Joe Beach
- White City
- Simmons Bayou

=== Time zones ===
By way of the Intracoastal Waterway, Gulf County is one of a small number of counties in the United States to be in two time zones, Eastern and Central in this case.

=== Adjacent counties ===
- Calhoun County, Florida — north
- Liberty County, Florida — northeast
- Franklin County, Florida — east
- Bay County, Florida — west

=== National protected area ===
- St. Vincent National Wildlife Refuge (part)

== Demographics ==
Historical population
Census	Pop.	Note	%±
1930	3,182		—
1940	6,951		118.4%
1950	7,460		7.3%
1960	9,937		33.2%
1970	10,096		1.6%
1980	10,658		5.6%
1990	11,504		7.9%
2000	13,332		15.9%
2010	15,863		19.0%
2020	14,192		−10.5%
2025 (est.)	15,943	▲	12.3%
U.S. Decennial Census; 1790-1960 1900-1990; 1990-2000 2010-2019

=== Racial and ethnic composition ===
Gulf County, Florida – Racial and ethnic composition Note: the US Census treats Hispanic/Latino as an ethnic category. This table excludes Latinos from the racial categories and assigns them to a separate category. Hispanics/Latinos may be of any race.
Race / Ethnicity (NH = Non-Hispanic)	Pop 1980	Pop 1990	Pop 2000	Pop 2010	Pop 2020	% 1980	% 1990	% 2000	% 2010	% 2020
White alone (NH)	8,359	9,193	10,492	11,881	11,222	78.43%	79.91%	78.70%	74.90%	79.07%
Black or African American alone (NH)	2,097	2,149	2,247	2,937	1,692	19.68%	18.68%	16.85%	18.51%	11.92%
Native American or Alaska Native alone (NH)	28	53	81	59	66	0.26%	0.46%	0.61%	0.37%	0.47%
Asian alone (NH)	23	23	53	41	57	0.22%	0.20%	0.40%	0.26%	0.40%
Native Hawaiian or Pacific Islander alone (NH)	x	x	6	3	0	x	x	0.05%	0.02%	0.00%
Other race alone (NH)	4	0	4	8	34	0.04%	0.00%	0.03%	0.05%	0.24%
Mixed race or Multiracial (NH)	x	x	179	256	566	x	x	1.34%	1.61%	3.99%
Hispanic or Latino (any race)	147	86	270	678	555	1.38%	0.75%	2.03%	4.27%	3.91%
Total	10,658	11,504	13,332	15,863	14,192	100.00%	100.00%	100.00%	100.00%	100.00%

Legend: Non-Hispanic White 50–60% 80–90% >90%

=== 2020 census ===
As of the 2020 census, the county had a population of 14,192, 5,571 households, and 3,656 families. The population density was 25.6 per square mile (9.9/km^{2}). There were 8,796 housing units at an average density of 15.9 per square mile (6.1/km^{2}).

The racial makeup of the county was 80.32% (11,399) white or European American (79.07% non-Hispanic white), 12.0% (1,703) black or African-American, 0.54% (76) Native American or Alaska Native, 0.4% (57) Asian, 0.03% (4) Pacific Islander or Native Hawaiian, 1.66% (236) from other races, and 5.05% (717) from two or more races. Hispanic or Latino residents of any race comprised 3.91% (555) of the population.

<0.1% of residents lived in urban areas, while 100.0% lived in rural areas.

There were 5,571 households in the county, of which 23.7% had children under the age of 18 living in them. Of all households, 49.0% were married-couple households, 19.7% were households with a male householder and no spouse or partner present, and 25.5% were households with a female householder and no spouse or partner present. About 28.2% of all households were made up of individuals and 15.0% had someone living alone who was 65 years of age or older.

The average household size was 2.1 and the average family size was 2.5.

There were 8,796 housing units, of which 36.7% were vacant. Among occupied housing units, 78.9% were owner-occupied and 21.1% were renter-occupied. The homeowner vacancy rate was 2.5% and the rental vacancy rate was 24.1%.

16.7% of the population was under the age of 18, 6.5% from 18 to 24, 22.2% from 25 to 44, 30.0% from 45 to 64, and 24.6% who were 65 years of age or older. The median age was 48.8 years; for every 100 females there were 87.3 males, and for every 100 females age 18 and older there were 86.0 males.

=== American Community Survey (2016–2020) estimates ===
The 2016–2020 5-year American Community Survey estimates show that the median household income was $50,640 (with a margin of error of +/- $3,582). The median family income was $60,978 (+/- $11,534). Males had a median income of $34,738 (+/- $4,577) versus $26,463 (+/- $5,198) for females. The median income for those above 16 years old was $31,055 (+/- $3,077). Approximately, 10.0% of families and 12.1% of the population were below the poverty line, including 13.9% of those under the age of 18 and 8.4% of those ages 65 or over.

=== 2000 census ===
As of the census of 2000, there were 13,332 people, 4,931 households, and 3,535 families residing in the county. The population density was 24 inhabitants per square mile (9.3/km^{2}). There were 7,587 housing units at an average density of 14 per square mile (5.4/km^{2}). The racial makeup of the county was 79.89% White, 16.94% Black or African American, 0.65% Native American, 0.40% Asian, 0.05% Pacific Islander, 0.53% from other races, and 1.55% from two or more races. 2.03% of the population were Hispanic or Latino of any race.

There were 4,931 households, out of which 28.40% had children under the age of 18 living with them, 55.50% were married couples living together, 11.90% had a female householder with no husband present, and 28.30% were non-families. 25.50% of all households were made up of individuals, and 11.40% had someone living alone who was 65 years of age or older. The average household size was 2.42 and the average family size was 2.87.

In the county, the population was spread out, with 21.70% under the age of 18, 6.80% from 18 to 24, 29.40% from 25 to 44, 26.00% from 45 to 64, and 16.20% who were 65 years of age or older. The median age was 40 years. For every 100 females, there were 114.60 males. For every 100 females age 18 and over, there were 116.70 males.

The median income for a household in the county was $30,276, and the median income for a family was $36,289. Males had a median income of $27,539 versus $20,780 for females. The per capita income for the county was $14,449. About 13.70% of families and 16.70% of the population were below the poverty line, including 20.80% of those under age 18 and 14.10% of those age 65 or over.

== Politics ==
Once heavily Democratic, Gulf County voted Republican at the presidential level for the first time in 1964 and has transitioned to a Republican stronghold at the presidential level. The county still supported conservative Democrats for local office until the 2000s. Republicans flipped most county offices in the 2010s and now consist of a strong majority of registered voters as of 2023.

The county is governed by a five-member Board of County Commissioners, elected in single-member districts. At the state level, Gulf County is represented by state senator Corey Simon (R) and state representative Jason Shoaf (R).

Gulf County is a part of Florida's 2nd Congressional District and is represented by Neal Dunn (R).

United States presidential election results for Gulf County, Florida
Year	Republican		Democratic		Third party(ies)	
Year	No.	%	No.	%	No.	%
1928	156	34.98%	275	61.66%	15	3.36%
1932	30	4.42%	648	95.58%	0	0.00%
1936	71	7.76%	844	92.24%	0	0.00%
1940	105	6.01%	1,642	93.99%	0	0.00%
1944	83	6.15%	1,267	93.85%	0	0.00%
1948	146	9.25%	1,219	77.20%	214	13.55%
1952	490	21.69%	1,769	78.31%	0	0.00%
1956	570	24.12%	1,793	75.88%	0	0.00%
1960	657	21.86%	2,348	78.14%	0	0.00%
1964	2,001	54.67%	1,659	45.33%	0	0.00%
1968	364	9.58%	711	18.71%	2,725	71.71%
1972	2,628	78.54%	713	21.31%	5	0.15%
1976	1,584	37.00%	2,641	61.69%	56	1.31%
1980	2,127	43.18%	2,700	54.81%	99	2.01%
1984	3,573	66.70%	1,784	33.30%	0	0.00%
1988	3,042	62.44%	1,688	34.65%	142	2.91%
1992	2,651	45.29%	1,938	33.11%	1,265	21.61%
1996	2,430	40.55%	2,480	41.39%	1,082	18.06%
2000	3,553	57.79%	2,398	39.00%	197	3.20%
2004	4,805	66.03%	2,407	33.08%	65	0.89%
2008	4,980	68.99%	2,149	29.77%	89	1.23%
2012	4,995	70.10%	2,014	28.26%	117	1.64%
2016	5,329	72.69%	1,720	23.46%	282	3.85%
2020	6,113	74.80%	1,985	24.29%	74	0.91%
2024	6,684	76.62%	1,970	22.58%	70	0.80%

United States Senate election results for Gulf County, Florida1
Year	Republican		Democratic		Third party(ies)	
Year	No.	%	No.	%	No.	%
2024	6,745	77.99%	1,757	20.32%	146	1.69%

United States Senate election results for Gulf County, Florida3
Year	Republican		Democratic		Third party(ies)	
Year	No.	%	No.	%	No.	%
2022	5,069	78.97%	1,295	20.17%	55	0.86%

Florida Gubernatorial election results for Gulf County
Year	Republican		Democratic		Third party(ies)	
Year	No.	%	No.	%	No.	%
2022	5,150	80.16%	1,247	19.41%	28	0.44%

== Education ==
Gulf County's sole school district is Gulf County Schools.

Gulf Coast State College operates the Gulf/Franklin Campus in Port St. Joe.

=== Libraries ===
Gulf County is part of the Northwest Regional Library System (NWRLS), which serves Bay and Liberty Counties as well.

- Bay County Public Library
- Panama City Beach Public Library
- Parker Public Library
- Springfield Public Library
- Gulf County Public Library
- Charles Whitehead Public Library
- Harrell Memorial Library of Liberty County
- Jimmy Weaver Memorial Library

== Transportation ==
=== Airports ===
- Costin Airport

== See also ==
- National Register of Historic Places listings in Gulf County, Florida
