= National Register of Historic Places listings in Gulf County, Florida =

Location of Gulf County in Florida

This is a list of the National Register of Historic Places listings in Gulf County, Florida.

This is intended to be a complete list of the properties on the National Register of Historic Places in Gulf County, Florida, United States. The locations of National Register properties for which the latitude and longitude coordinates are included below, may be seen in a map.

There are 4 properties listed on the National Register in the county.

This National Park Service list is complete through NPS recent listings posted May 1, 2026.

Contents: Counties in Florida (non-linked contain no National Register listings)
Alachua - Baker - Bay - Bradford - Brevard - Broward - Calhoun - Charlotte - Citrus - Clay - Collier - Columbia - DeSoto - Dixie - Duval - Escambia - Flagler - Franklin - Gadsden - Gilchrist - Glades - Gulf - Hamilton - Hardee - Hendry - Hernando - Highlands - Hillsborough (Tampa) - Holmes - Indian River - Jackson - Jefferson - Lafayette - Lake - Lee - Leon - Levy - Liberty - Madison - Manatee - Marion - Martin - Miami-Dade (Miami) - Monroe - Nassau - Okaloosa - Okeechobee - Orange - Osceola - Palm Beach - Pasco - Pinellas - Polk - Putnam - St. Johns - St. Lucie - Santa Rosa - Sarasota - Seminole - Sumter - Suwannee - Taylor - Union - Volusia - Wakulla - Walton - Washington

== Current listings ==
	Name on the Register	Image	Date listed	Location	City or town	Description
1	Cape San Blas Lighthouse at Port St. Joe	Cape San Blas Lighthouse at Port St. Joe	May 7, 2015 (#15000208)	200 Miss Zola's Dr. 29°48′48″N 85°18′23″W	Port St. Joe	
2	Centennial Building	Centennial Building	March 12, 1996 (#96000230)	300 Allen Memorial Way; 29°47′36″N 85°17′43″W	Port St. Joe	
3	Port Theatre Art and Culture Center	Port Theatre Art and Culture Center	June 5, 2003 (#03000508)	314 Reid Avenue; 29°48′48″N 85°18′13″W	Port St. Joe	
4	St. Joseph Catholic Mission Church	St. Joseph Catholic Mission Church	July 31, 1998 (#98000924)	216 8th Street; 29°48′30″N 85°18′06″W	Port St. Joe	

== See also ==
- List of National Historic Landmarks in Florida
- National Register of Historic Places listings in Florida
