= Roman Quinn =

American baseball player (born 1993)

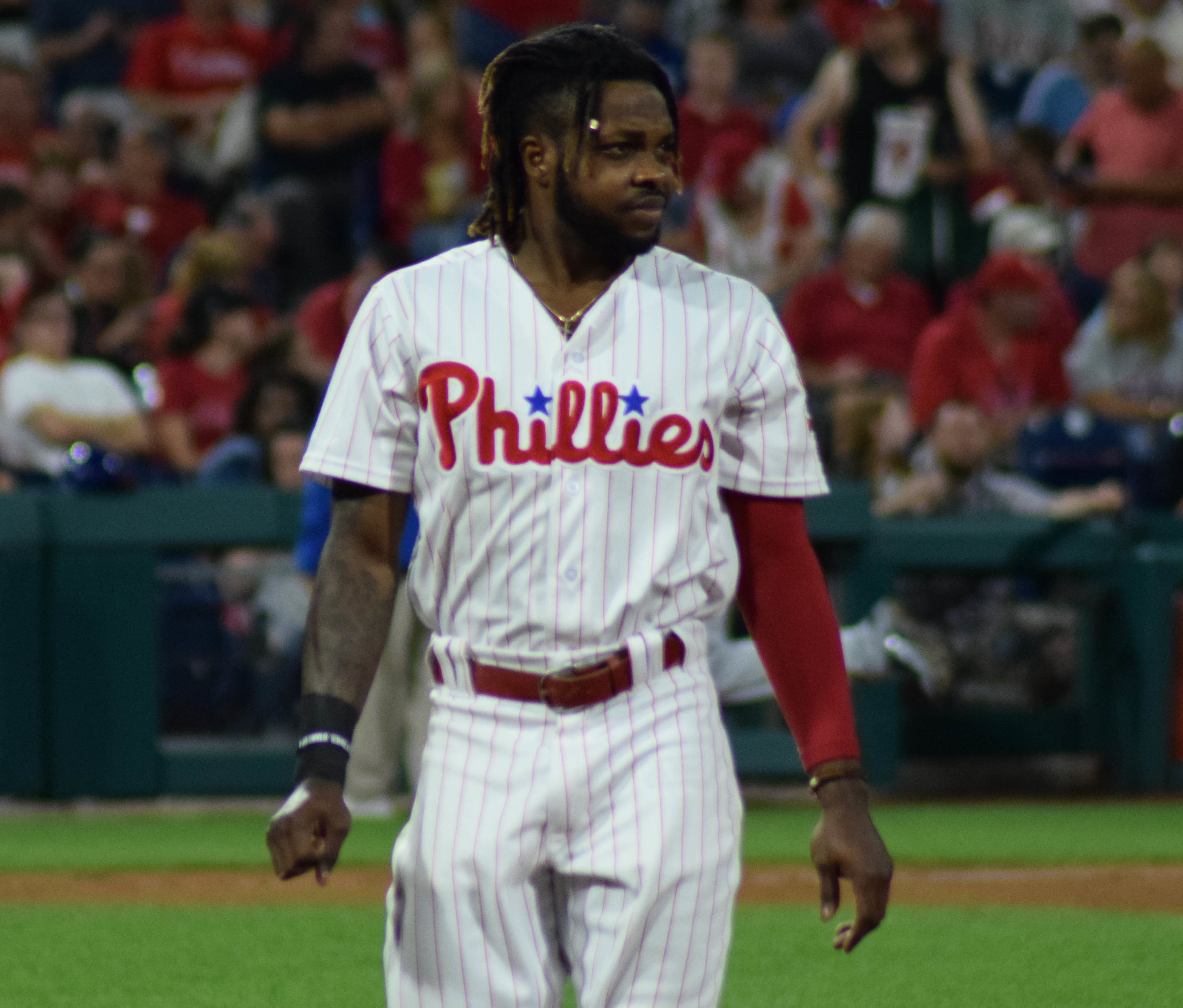
- Quinn in September 2018
- Outfielder
- Born: May 14, 1993 (age 33); Port St. Joe, Florida, U.S.
- Batted: Switch Threw: Right

MLB debut
- September 11, 2016, for the Philadelphia Phillies

Last MLB appearance
- August 19, 2022, for the Tampa Bay Rays

Career statistics
- Batting average: .226
- Home runs: 8
- Runs batted in: 45
- Stats at Baseball Reference

Teams
- Philadelphia Phillies (2016, 2018–2022); Tampa Bay Rays (2022)

Roman Tredarian Quinn (born May 14, 1993) is an American former professional baseball center fielder. He played in Major League Baseball (MLB) for the Philadelphia Phillies and Tampa Bay Rays.

Quinn grew up in an athletic family in Port St. Joe, Florida, and played basketball, gridiron football, and baseball at Port St. Joe High School. His rapid sprint speed caught the attention of sports journalists while he was still in high school, and the Phillies drafted Quinn in the second round of the 2011 MLB draft. Quinn had previously committed to play college baseball for Florida State, but chose instead to sign with the Phillies. He began playing professional baseball within the Phillies' farm system in 2012, when he was assigned to the Class A Short-Season Williamsport Crosscutters. There, his batting technique and running abilities caused local reporters to dub Quinn the "Human Highlight Reel".

Beginning in 2013, injuries began to plague Quinn's career. A hairline fracture in his right wrist, followed by a ruptured Achilles tendon during the offseason, kept him from the field from June 2013 to May 2014. The following June, with the Reading Fightin Phils, Quinn suffered a torn hip flexor that kept him on the disabled list for the remainder of the season. A premature return from an abdominal oblique strain in July, as well as a concussion, limited Quinn to 77 games in 2016, but he returned by September to make his major league debut.

Despite telling journalists that his main goal for the 2017 season was to remain healthy, Quinn suffered an injury to his ulnar collateral ligament that May, and missed the remainder of the season. He played a handful of games with the Toros del Este of the Dominican Professional Baseball League, and was in contention for a major league role at spring training in 2018. Quinn was instead assigned to the Lehigh Valley IronPigs, where he suffered a torn ligament in his middle finger, before being called up to the Phillies at the end of July. He played through the end of the season with a broken pinky toe, but missed Opening Day the following year due to a preseason oblique strain. After a largely healthy 2019 and 2020, Quinn again ruptured his Achilles tendon while rounding the bases in May 2021, ending his season after only 28 games.

== Early life ==
Quinn was born on May 14, 1993, in Port St. Joe, Florida. He came from an athletic family, with relatives who participated in track and field, baseball, and gridiron football. He attended Port St. Joe High School, playing on the same football team as future National Football League (NFL) player Calvin Pryor. He was a three-sport athlete, earning all-state honors and scoring an average of 20.6 points per game in basketball, serving as a return specialist and defensive back on the football team, and playing in center field for the baseball team. In 2011, during Quinn's senior year of high school, Baseball America named him the fastest man in their Top 200 pre-draft report; he had a 6.35-second 60-yard dash speed, and took an average of 4.20 seconds to run from home plate to first base. Quinn was also a strong hitter, with a .458 batting average, two home runs, and 20 runs batted in (RBIs) as a junior in 2010.

== Professional career ==
=== Philadelphia Phillies ===
==== Minor leagues ====
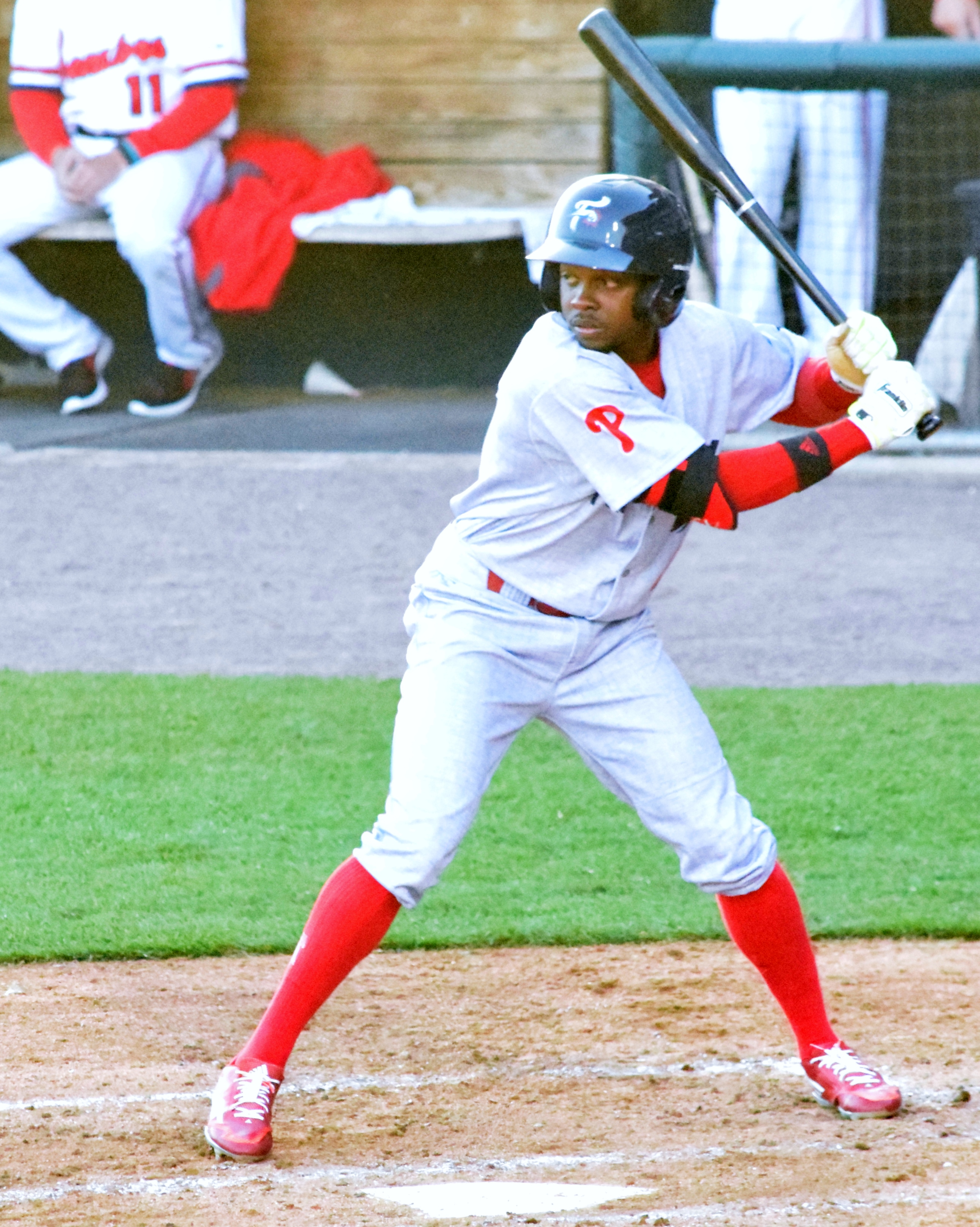
Quinn at bat with the Reading Fightin Phils in 2016

The Philadelphia Phillies of Major League Baseball (MLB) selected Quinn in the second round, 66th overall, of the 2011 MLB draft. Quinn had previously committed to play college baseball at Florida State University, but turned down the team's athletic scholarship to sign with the Phillies for a $775,000 signing bonus. Because he did not sign with the Phillies until the day before the MLB deadline for college-committed players, Quinn could not start playing professional baseball until the 2012 season. Quinn began his professional career in 2012 with the Low–A Williamsport Crosscutters of the New York–Penn League. Despite batting right-handed and playing in the outfield in high school, he became a switch hitter and a shortstop with the Crosscutters. Sports journalists in Williamsport took notice of Quinn's "put the ball on the ground and run" batting style and declared him the "Human Highlight Reel". He finished the season with a .281 average in 66 games and 267 at bats, with 75 hits, one home run, and 23 RBI, as well as 30 stolen bases. Additionally, Quinn's 11 triples were the most in the New York–Penn League and in the Phillies organization.

Going into the 2013 season, Baseball America named Quinn the second-best prospect in the Phillies' farm system, and the 100th-best prospect in baseball. He was assigned to the Single–A Lakewood BlueClaws to start the season, and on April 9, Quinn hit an inside-the-park home run in a game against the Hagerstown Suns. On June 24, 2013, Quinn suffered a hairline fracture in his right wrist, ending his season early. In 67 games for Lakewood, he boasted a .238 average, with 62 hits, five home runs, and 21 RBI in 260 at bats, as well as 32 stolen bases in 67 games. During the offseason, Quinn ruptured his right Achilles tendon, putting him out of commission for the start of the following year. Quinn returned to the field in May 2014, playing with the High–A Clearwater Threshers. He began the season as a shortstop, but after J. P. Crawford was promoted to Clearwater that June, Quinn was moved back to center field. He spent most of the season as the Threshers' leadoff hitter, batting .257 with seven home runs, 36 RBI, 32 stolen bases, and a .343 on-base percentage in 88 games. After the conclusion of the regular 2014 Minor League Baseball season, Quinn was sent to play in the Arizona Fall League for additional development. While playing with the Scottsdale Scorpions, Quinn was first in the league with 14 stolen bases and second in runs scored with 19. He was named both to the Top Prospects Team, selected by managers and coaches, and to the Fall Stars Game.

The following year, Quinn was assigned to the Double–A Reading Fightin Phils of the Eastern League. That July, he was one of four Reading players named to the Eastern League All-Star Classic. At the time, he led the Eastern League with 29 stolen bases and six triples, and was seventh in the MiLB with a .306 batting average. He did not end up playing in the game, however; on June 12, the day after an 18-inning game with Reading, a dehydrated and exhausted Quinn was injured in the second inning of a game with what was later diagnosed as a Grade 3 tear to his left hip flexor. He did not play for the rest of the season. On November 20, 2015, the Phillies added Quinn to their expanded 40-man roster to protect him from the Rule 5 draft. He recorded four home runs, 15 RBI, and a .306 average in 257 plate appearances with Reading in 2015. Quinn recovered from the injury by October 15, the start of the Dominican Professional Baseball League season, and joined the Tigres del Licey. Quinn, alongside a number of fellow MLB prospects, helped take the Tigres to the Dominican League playoff series. He batted .212 with two home runs, seven RBI, and two triples in 99 at–bats, and eight stolen bases in 25 games.

Quinn rejoined Reading for the 2016 season as the No. 7 Phillies prospect, according to MLB.com. He went into the season with a desire to increase his on-field versatility by learning the other outfield positions. Once again, his season was hindered by injury: Quinn strained his abdominal oblique at the plate on June 4, and returned to the field prematurely ten days later. Because the injury was not healed when he began playing again, Quinn missed nearly two months of the season for additional recovery. He returned to the disabled list in August after being hit in the head during an attempted pickoff throw. In the injury-riddled season, Quinn finished the year with a .302 average with six home runs, 25 RBI, and 36 stolen bases in 77 games.

==== Major leagues ====
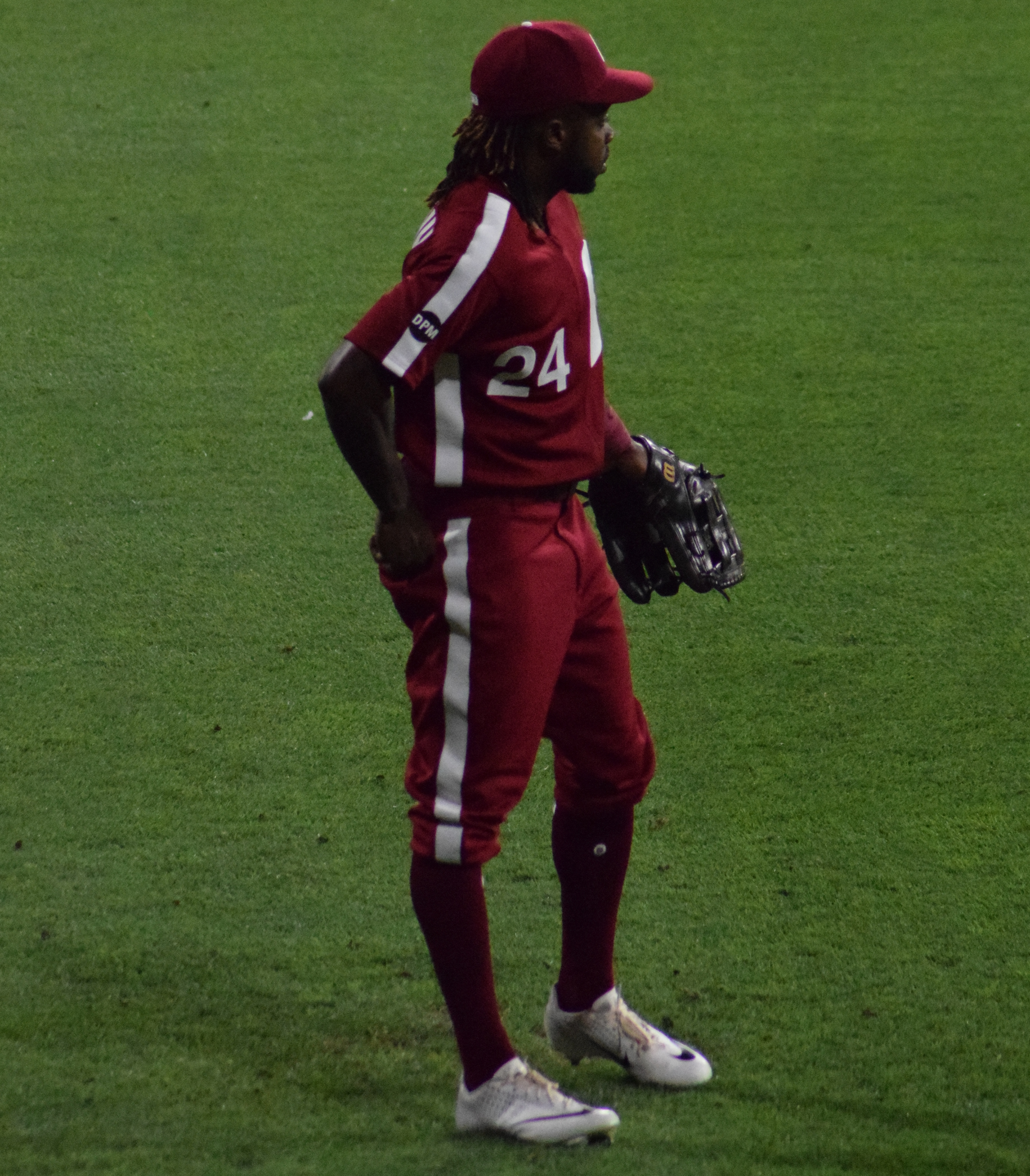
Quinn in the outfield during a July 2019 game

When the minor league season ended, Quinn was promoted to the Phillies' extended roster as a September call-up. He made his major league debut on September 11, 2016, playing in center field and batting second in the order against the Washington Nationals, and went 0–3 and drew a walk. The following day, in a home game against the Pittsburgh Pirates, Quinn hit two doubles, stole a base, drew a walk, and drove in two runs in a 6–2 victory. On September 27, Quinn left a game against the Atlanta Braves in the sixth inning with another oblique strain, ending his season early. In 15 major league games with the Phillies, he hit .263 with six RBI and five stolen bases in six attempts.

When asked about his plan for 2017, Quinn told reporters, "My goal is to stay healthy, man, just to be honest with you", and expressed his frustration at never playing a full season of baseball. Going into the season as Baseball America's No. 8 prospect, Quinn was assigned to the Triple–A Lehigh Valley IronPigs. While sliding into third base on May 28, Quinn suffered an injury to his ulnar collateral ligament, which kept him out for the remainder of the season. In 45 games with Lehigh, Quinn batted .274 with two home runs, 13 RBI, and 10 stolen bases. That winter, he returned to the Dominican League, playing in six games for the Toros del Este. There, he batted .125 in 19 plate appearances, with two hits and two runs.

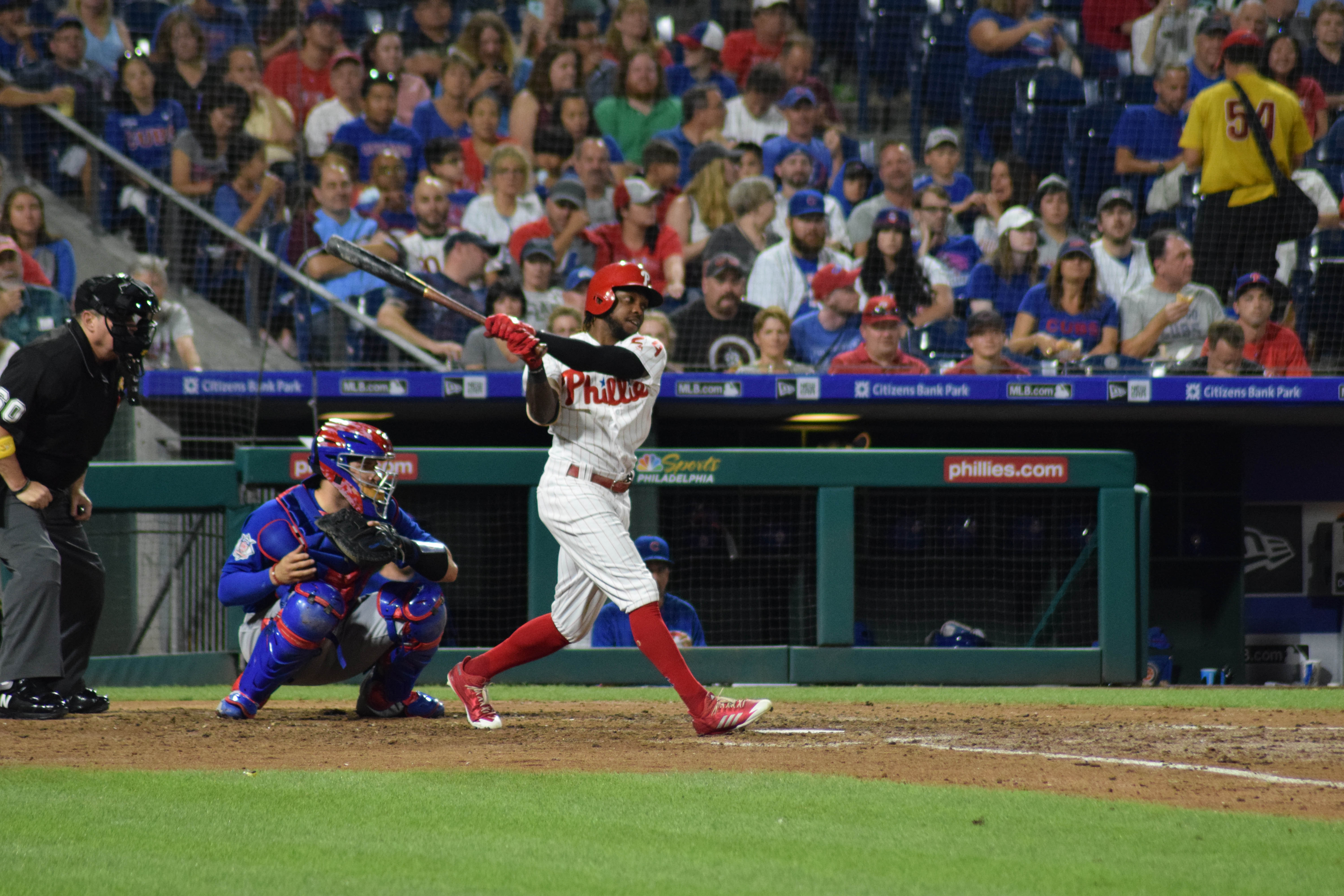
Quinn swings through a pitch during a July 2018 game

After appearing in spring training with the Phillies, where he was evaluated for a possible major league position in the outfield or at shortstop, Quinn returned to Lehigh Valley in 2018. That May, Quinn tore a ligament in his right middle finger while diving into a base, and spent several weeks on the disabled list to recover from surgery. On July 27, 2018, after his rehabilitation process, Quinn was recalled to the Phillies to be used as a pinch runner or pinch hitter. Three days later, manager Gabe Kapler chose to give Quinn the start over right fielder Nick Williams for a game against the Boston Red Sox. In the first game of a doubleheader against the New York Mets on August 16, Quinn and fellow position player Scott Kingery were required to pitch the final innings of a 24–4 loss when the team ran out of available relief pitchers. His first major league home run came on August 21, against Nationals pitcher Matt Grace. In September, Quinn suffered a "very, very small" fracture to his right pinky toe, but was expected to play through the end of the season. Quinn finished the season with a .260 average, including two home runs and 12 RBI, in 131 at–bats, as well as 10 stolen bases in 50 games.

Quinn began the 2019 season on the 10-day injured list after suffering an oblique strain during training camp. He returned to the team after recovering from the injury, and successfully stole home plate in the third inning of a 2–1 loss to the Miami Marlins. On July 16, when Yacksel Ríos allowed three extra-base hits and hit Justin Turner with a pitch, Quinn was called to pitch the final outs of a 16–2 loss against the Los Angeles Dodgers. Quinn was called to pitch again on August 3, when a game against the Chicago White Sox bled into 15 innings. He pitched a scoreless 14th inning before the Phillies eventually fell 4–3. That day, Quinn became the first Phillies position player since 1961 to make at least three career pitching appearances for the team, as well as the first major league player to record three hits, two stolen bases, and an appearance on the mound in the same game since George Sisler in 1920. On August 17, while fielding a ground ball, Quinn suffered a groin injury that echoed a strain earlier in the season. He did not play again that season. In 44 games for the Phillies in 2019, Quinn batted .213, with 23 hits, four home runs, and 11 RBI in 108 at–bats.

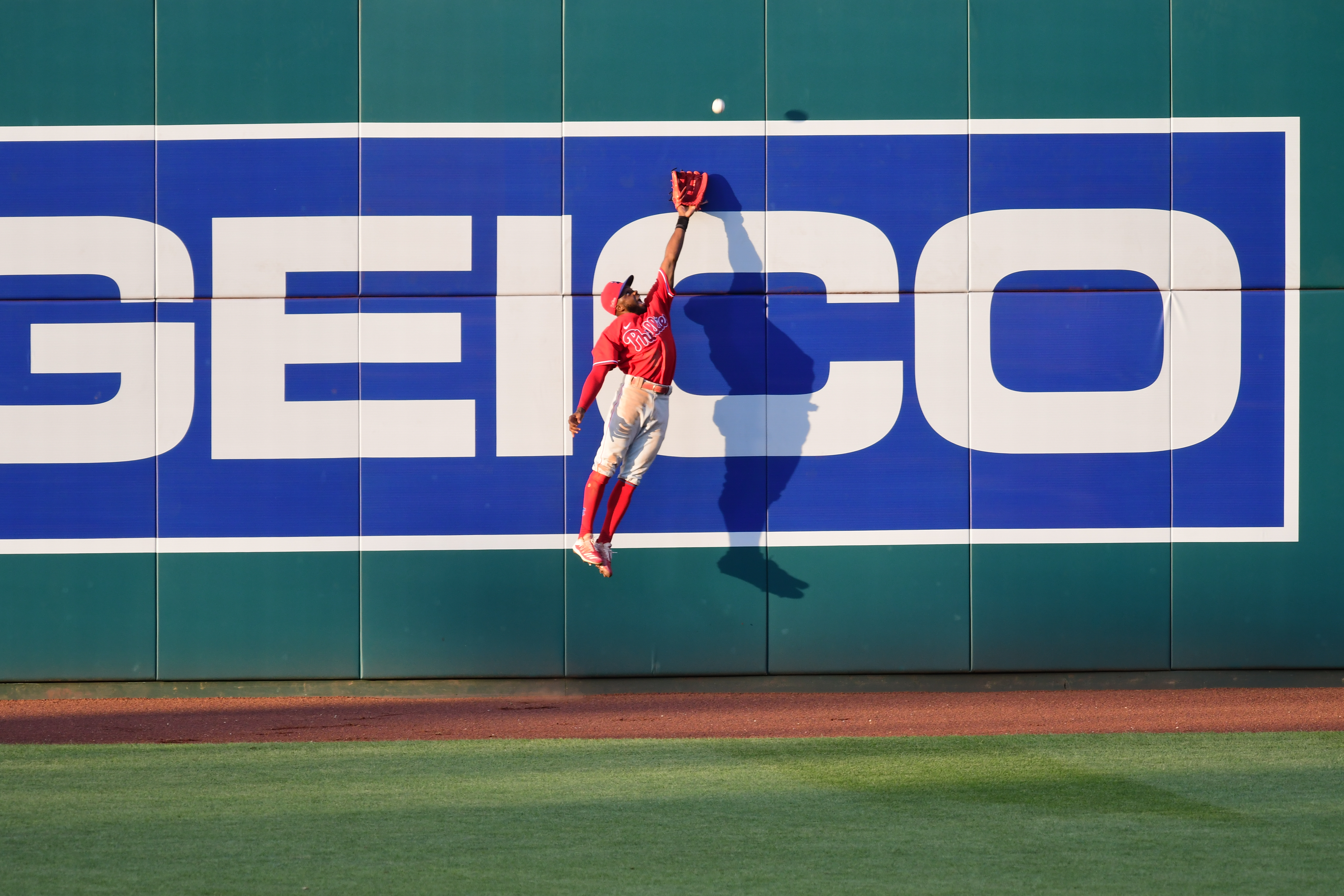
Quinn in the outfield during the pandemic shortened 2020 season, the first time Quinn made an opening day roster

Quinn was named to his first-ever Opening Day roster in 2020, serving as one of six outfielders in an expanded 29-member team. On August 25, while playing the Nationals, both Quinn and left fielder Andrew McCutchen stole second base twice, leading to a season-high four stolen bases in one game for the Phillies. Quinn repeated the feat on September 5, stealing two bases against the Mets. In the sixth inning of that same game, Quinn crashed into the outfield wall while chasing a fly ball, and was placed on concussion protocols. On September 21, Quinn and manager Joe Girardi were both ejected from a game against the Nationals after arguing with home plate umpire Junior Valentine on a called third strike. In the 2020 season, which was shortened due to the COVID-19 pandemic, Quinn played in 41 out of 60 games, collecting two home runs, seven RBI, and 12 stolen bases, as well as a .213 average.

Going into 2021, Quinn became part of a battle to start in center field, competing for the position with Kingery, Odubel Herrera, new signing Travis Jankowski, and prospect Mickey Moniak. On March 30, Herrera was cut from the team, giving Quinn and prospect Adam Haseley the opportunity to alternate in center field. On May 26, while attempting to round third base in a game against the Tampa Bay Rays, Quinn collapsed on the turf, falling again when he crossed home plate. An MRI confirmed that Quinn had ruptured his Achilles tendon, and the recovery period was expected to be nine to twelve months. He appeared in 28 games before his season-ending injury, recording a .173 average, two RBI, and four stolen bases in 52 at bats, while on defense he had a 1.000 fielding percentage with two assists. On November 30, 2021, Quinn was non-tendered by the Phillies, making him a free agent.

On March 12, 2022, the Miami Marlins signed Quinn to a minor league contract with an invitation to spring training. However, on April 9, the Phillies signed Quinn to a minor league contract. He was promoted to the club's major league roster on April 25, after Bryson Stott was optioned to Triple–A. Quinn was designated for assignment on June 1. At the time, he had batted .162 and struck out 15 times in 40 plate appearances. On June 5, Quinn elected free agency after rejecting an outright assignment to Lehigh Valley.

=== Kansas City Royals ===
On June 8, 2022, Quinn signed a minor league deal with the Kansas City Royals. On July 18, Quinn was released shortly after being placed on the injured list.

=== Tampa Bay Rays ===
On July 21, 2022, Quinn signed a major league contract with the Tampa Bay Rays. In 21 games for the Rays, he batted .262/.340/.405 with no home runs and four RBI. On November 10, Quinn was removed from the 40-man roster, and subsequently elected free agency.

=== Cleveland Guardians ===
On January 4, 2023, Quinn signed a minor league contract with the Cleveland Guardians. The deal included an invitation to the Guardians' major league spring training camp. He played in 15 games for the Triple–A Columbus Clippers, hitting just .177/.391/.235 with no home runs, six RBI, and two stolen bases. On May 9, Quinn was released by the Guardians organization.

=== Milwaukee Brewers ===
On May 24, 2023, Quinn signed a minor league contract with the Milwaukee Brewers organization. Quinn hit a feeble .121/.275/.152 with no home runs, three RBI and five stolen bases in 10 games for the Triple–A Nashville Sounds. He was released by Milwaukee on June 19.

=== Colorado Rockies ===
On July 29, 2023, Quinn signed a minor league contract with the Colorado Rockies organization. In 23 games for the Triple–A Albuquerque Isotopes, he batted .219/.326/.397 with two home runs, 15 RBI, and nine stolen bases. On September 14, Quinn was released by Colorado.

Following his release from the Rockies organization, Quinn retired from professional baseball.

== Coaching career ==
On February 12, 2025, Quinn was hired by the Atlanta Braves to serve as a coach for their rookie-level affiliate, the Florida Complex League Braves.

== Player profile ==
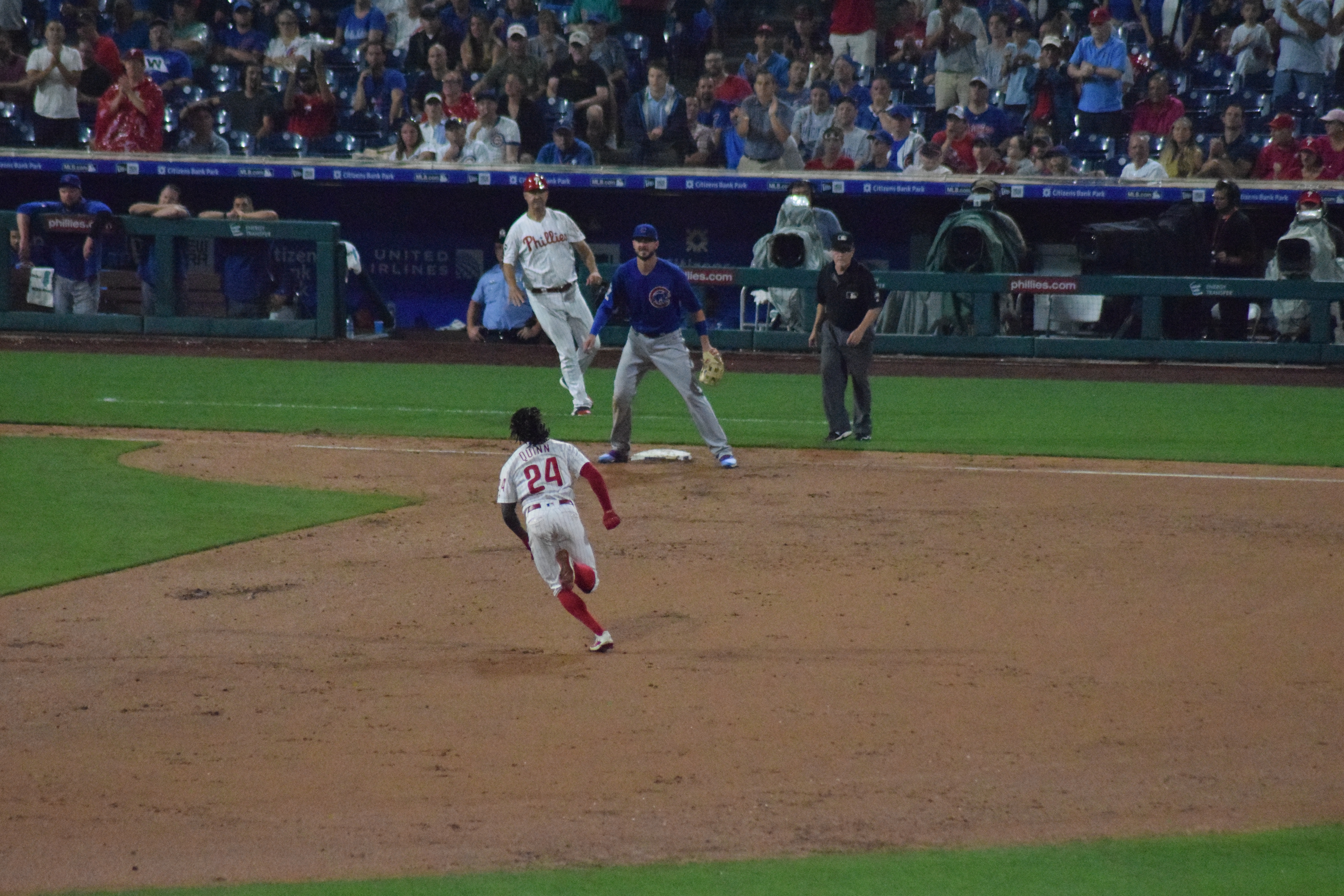
Quinn beats out a triple in an August 2019 game

Quinn, shorter than many of his teammates at 5 ft 9 in (1.75 m) and known for his speed while running the bases, drew early comparisons to retired Phillies shortstop Jimmy Rollins. During the 2020 season, Quinn led the MLB in sprint speed, capable of running 30.4 feet per second (9.3 m/s), an improvement from the previous year's 30.1 ft/s (9.2 m/s) average. He attributed the development to losing 5 pounds (2.3 kg) during the offseason. Former MLB outfielder Kenny Lofton helped Quinn develop a batting style that would take advantage of his smaller frame and rapid speed, allowing him to compete with larger, slower power hitters. He emphasizes bunting, line drives, and other batting techniques that slow down the speed of play, thus allowing Quinn to safely reach base, whereupon he can attempt to steal.

Like many hitters with his speed, Quinn is a switch hitter. The Phillies signed Quinn as a right-handed hitter out of high school, but he used a delay between signing and playing with the team during the 2011–12 offseason to learn how to bat from both sides. Despite his fast, aggressive playing style, Quinn struggles at times with getting on base. In his final 16 games of 2018, for instance, he went only 5 for 47, with 21 strikeouts. There have been additional concerns about Quinn's frequent injuries; at no point since the 2014 season has he made more than 300 plate appearances.

== Personal life ==
Quinn married his girlfriend, Jenifer McLemore, on January 27, 2018. The couple has one daughter, Londyn Gabriella, born on July 8, 2014, and two sons, Khailan Grey (b. February 7, 2019) and Oaklan Gabriel (b. October 19, 2020). During the offseason, Quinn and his family reside in Port St. Joe. In 2018, Quinn, his wife and children, and his extended family, were impacted when Hurricane Michael hit the Florida Panhandle, including Port St. Joe. Although no one in Quinn's family was harmed by the storm, Quinn and his wife lost power, and his wife's family suffered property damage. He told reporters after the storm passed, "We will be cleaning up for years."
