= Mexico Beach, Florida =

- City
- City of Mexico Beach
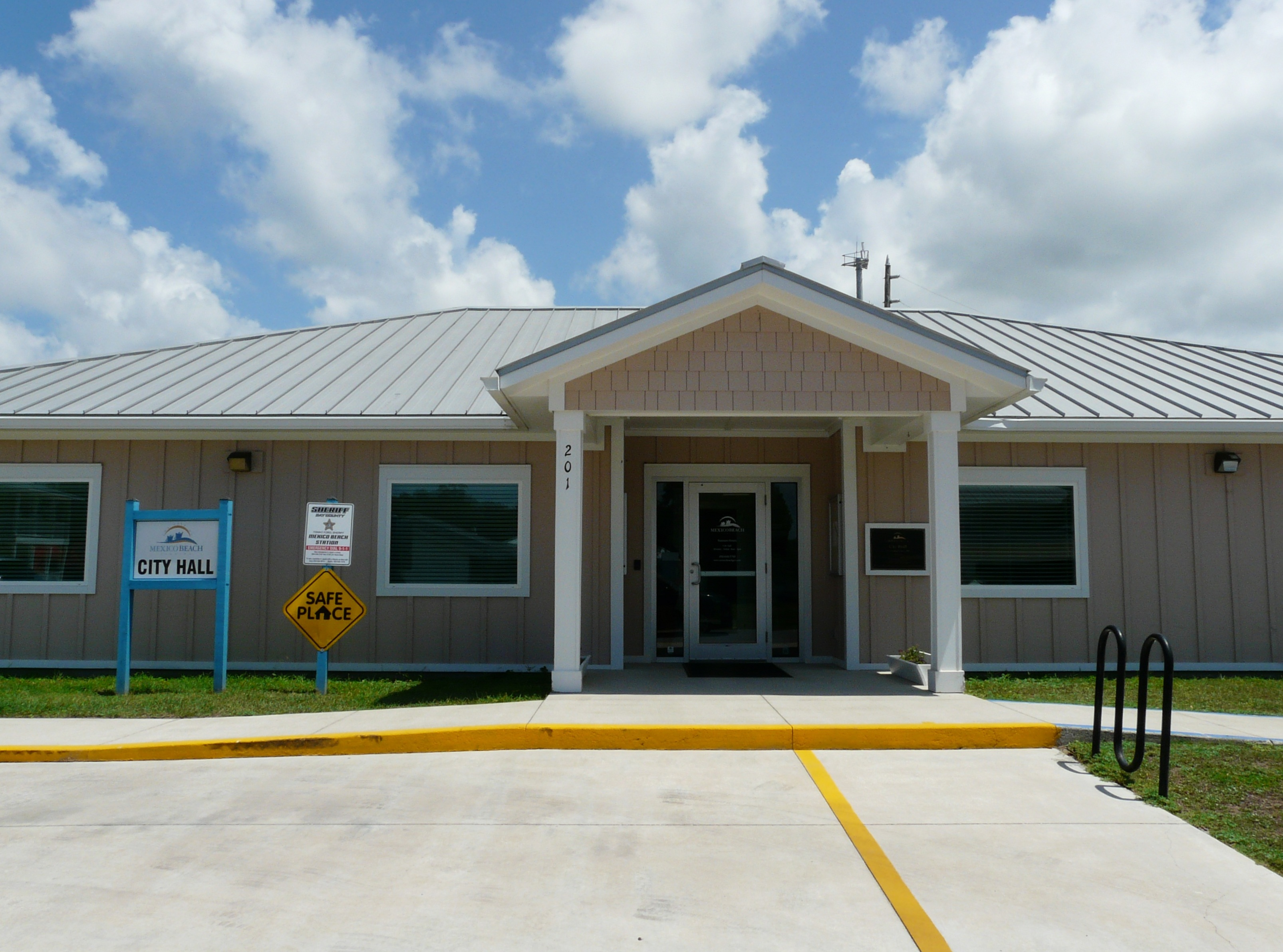
- Mexico Beach City Hall in 2026

- Logo

- Location within Bay County and Florida
- Coordinates: 29°56′23″N 85°24′57″W
- Country: United States
- State: Florida
- County: Bay
- Founded: 1946
- Incorporated: 1967

Government
  - Type: Council-Manager
  - Mayor: Richard Wolff
  - Councilors: Erik Fosshage, Jason Adams, Linda Hamilton, and Steve Cox
  - City Administrator: Mell Smigielski
  - City Clerk: Tammy H. Brunson
  - City Attorney: Timothy "Tim" J. Sloan

Area
  - Total: 2.34 sq mi (6.06 km^{2})
  - Land: 2.27 sq mi (5.89 km^{2})
  - Water: 0.062 sq mi (0.16 km^{2})
- Elevation: 13 ft (4.0 m)

Population (2020)
  - Total: 916
  - Density: 402.5/sq mi (155.39/km^{2})
- Time zone: UTC−06:00 (Central (CST))
  - Summer (DST): UTC−05:00 (CDT)
- ZIP Code: 32456
- Area code(s): 850, 448
- FIPS code: 12-44300
- GNIS ID: 2404246
- Website: mexicobeachfl.gov

Mexico Beach is a city in Bay County, Florida, United States. It is located 25 miles (40 km) southeast of Panama City on the Florida Panhandle. It is part of the Panama City-Panama City Beach, Florida Metropolitan Statistical Area in North Florida. The population was 916 at the 2020 census, down from 1,072 at the 2010 census.

The community was extensively damaged by Hurricane Michael on October 10, 2018. The Federal Emergency Management Agency (FEMA) declared the community "wiped out" in the aftermath of the hurricane's devastating impact. The city has rebuilt since that storm.

== History ==
The City of Mexico Beach was founded in 1946 when real estate development began, but officially incorporated as a municipality in 1967.

Before Hurricane Michael, "the town was 'old Florida,' ... a collection of 50-year-old bungalows and newer vacation homes on stilts," where tourists walked on white sand beaches.

On November 22, 1985, Hurricane Kate's eye passed over Mexico Beach. Category 2 winds and tides destroyed beachfront homes and businesses.

=== Hurricane Michael ===
Hurricane Michael made landfall near Mexico Beach on October 10, 2018, just before 1 p.m. local time with maximum sustained winds of 160 miles per hour (260 km/h), the first Category 5 hurricane to make landfall in the United States since Hurricane Andrew in 1992. Michael made history as the third strongest (by pressure) and fourth strongest (by wind speed) landfalling storm in the continental United States. The storm caused extensive damage to the community, and to the nearby Tyndall Air Force Base. Nearly all homes were totally destroyed. Brock Long, the FEMA administrator, told CNN that Mexico Beach was "wiped out" and referred to the community as "ground zero". The elementary school and city hall were among the buildings devastated; the pier washed away, and the water tower was knocked down.

A report by the State indicated that roughly 285 people in Mexico Beach had declined to evacuate the area, although some of those may have left before the peak of the storm. Three people from Mexico Beach were listed among the deaths due to the hurricane. At that time, Mayor Al Cathey told residents it might be months before electricity, water, and plumbing were restored.

=== Rebuilding ===
The city has rebuilt since the storm, with aid from the federal government and its own expenditures. The population of the county rebounded by 2024.

== Geography ==
The City of Mexico Beach is located on the southernmost tip of Bay County.

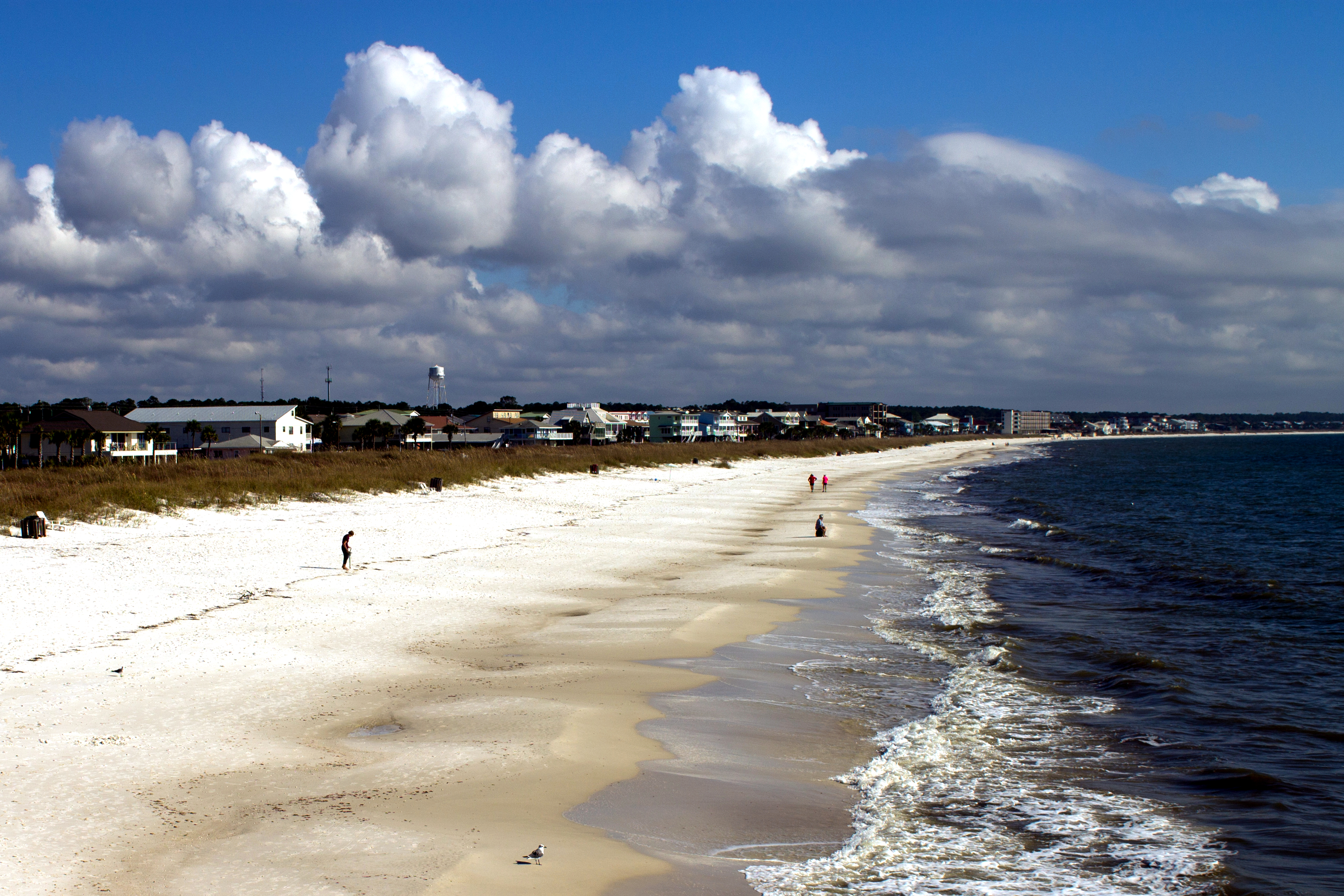
Mexico Beach waterfront in 2013

According to the United States Census Bureau, the city has a total area of 1.8 square miles (4.7 km^{2}), of which 1.8 square miles (4.6 km^{2}) is land, and 0.04 square miles (0.1 km^{2}), or 2.84%, is water.

=== Climate ===
The climate in this area is characterized by hot, humid summers and generally mild winters. According to the Köppen climate classification, Mexico Beach has a humid subtropical climate zone (Cfa).

== Demographics ==
Historical population
Census	Pop.	Note	%±
1970	588		—
1980	632		7.5%
1990	992		57.0%
2000	1,017		2.5%
2010	1,072		5.4%
2020	916		−14.6%
U.S. Decennial Census

=== 2010 and 2020 census ===
Mexico Beach racial composition (Hispanics excluded from racial categories) (NH = Non-Hispanic)
Race	Pop 2010	Pop 2020	% 2010	% 2020
White (NH)	981	828	91.51%	90.39%
Black or African American (NH)	19	9	1.77%	0.98%
Native American or Alaska Native (NH)	4	1	0.37%	0.11%
Asian (NH)	8	6	0.75%	0.66%
Pacific Islander or Native Hawaiian (NH)	0	0	0.00%	0.00%
Some other race (NH)	0	0	0.00%	0.00%
Two or more races/Multiracial (NH)	32	37	2.99%	4.04%
Hispanic or Latino (any race)	28	35	2.61%	3.82%
Total	1,072	916		

As of the 2020 United States census, there were 916 people, 745 households, and 415 families residing in the city.

As of the 2010 United States census, there were 1,072 people, 599 households, and 325 families residing in the city.

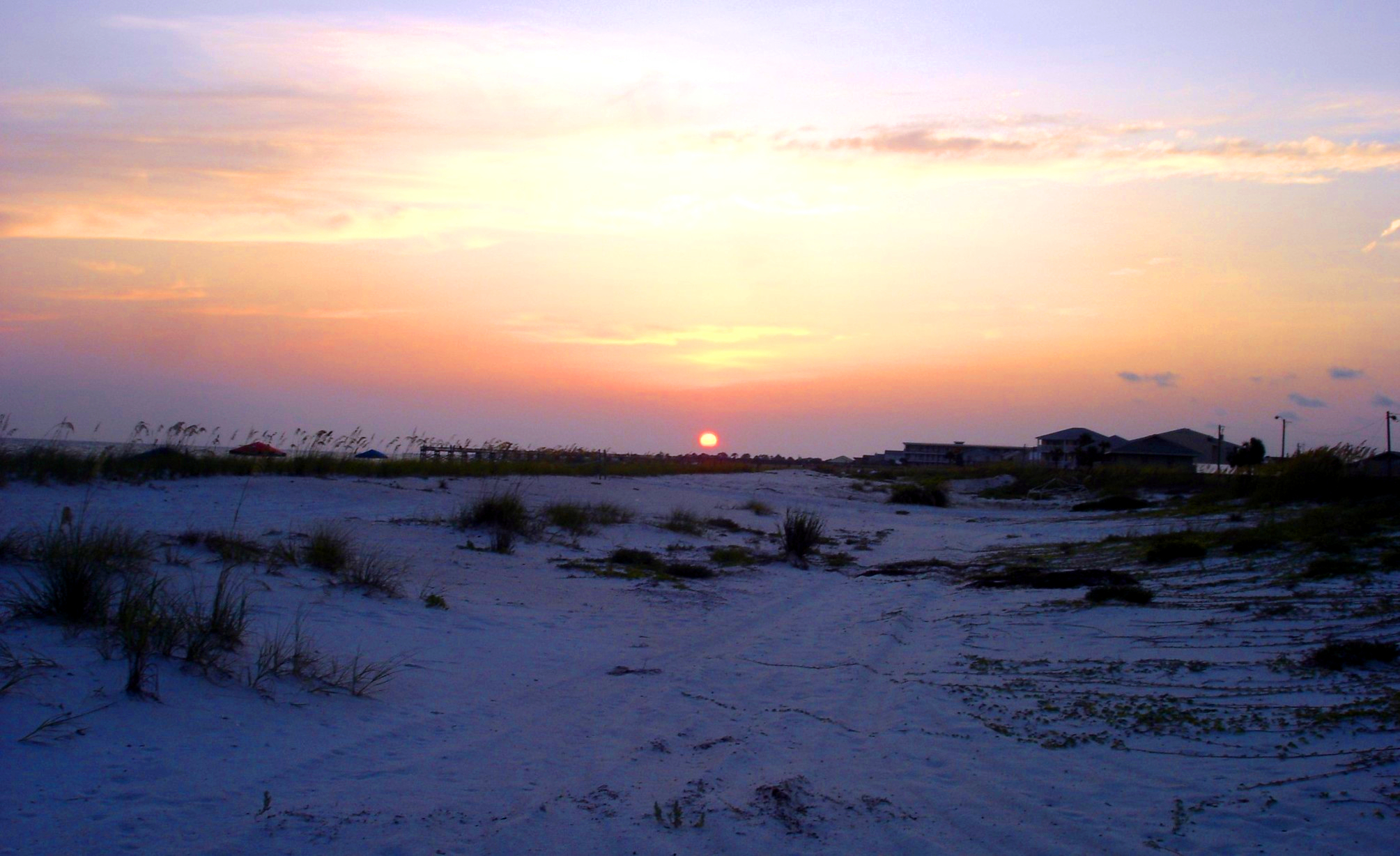
Sunset over Mexico Beach pier from the dunes in 2009

In 2010, the population density was 595.6 inhabitants per square mile (230.0/km^{2}). There were 1,852 housing units at an average density of 1,028.9 units per square mile (397.3 units/km^{2}).

In 2010, there were 599 households, out of which 11.4% had children under the age of 18 living with them, 47.8% were headed by married couples living together, 6.7% had a female householder with no husband present, and 43.2% were non-families. 38.4% of all households were made up of individuals, and 15.6% were someone living alone who was 65 years of age or older. The average household size was 1.90, and the average family size was 2.43.

In 2010, in the city, the population was spread out, with 11.3% under the age of 18, 5.4% from 18 to 24, 16.7% from 25 to 44, 35.5% from 45 to 64, and 31.2% who were 65 years of age or older. The median age was 55.1 years. For every 100 females, there were 94.2 males. For every 100 females age 18 and over, there were 95.3 males.

=== 2000 census ===
As of the census of 2000, there were 1,017 people, 526 households, and 319 families residing in the city. The population density was 299.7 people/km^{2} (776 people/mi^{2}). There were 1,322 housing units at an average density of 389.6 units/km^{2} (1,009 units/mi^{2}). The racial makeup of the city was 95.67% White, 1.28% African American, 0.49% Native American, 0.79% Asian, 0.39% Pacific Islander, and 1.38% from two or more races. Hispanic or Latino of any race were 1.77% of the population.

In 2000, there were 526 households out of which 11.8% had children under the age of 18 living with them, 53.4% were married couples living together, 5.3% had a female householder with no husband present, and 39.2% were non-families. 33.8% of all households were made up of individuals and 15.2% had someone living alone who was 65 years of age or older. The average household size was 1.93 and the average family size was 2.42.

In 2000, in the city the population was spread out with 11.1% under the age of 18, 3.9% from 18 to 24, 19.8% from 25 to 44, 34.8% from 45 to 64, and 30.4% who were 65 years of age or older. The median age was 54 years. For every 100 females there were 97.5 males. For every 100 females age 18 and over, there were 95.7 males.

In 2000, the median income for a household in the city was $31,950, and the median income for a family was $40,163. Males had a median income of $30,278 versus $23,125 for females. The per capita income for the city was $22,871. About 8.1% of families and 11.5% of the population were below the poverty line, including 18.8% of those under age 18 and 10.7% of those age 65 or over.

== Education ==
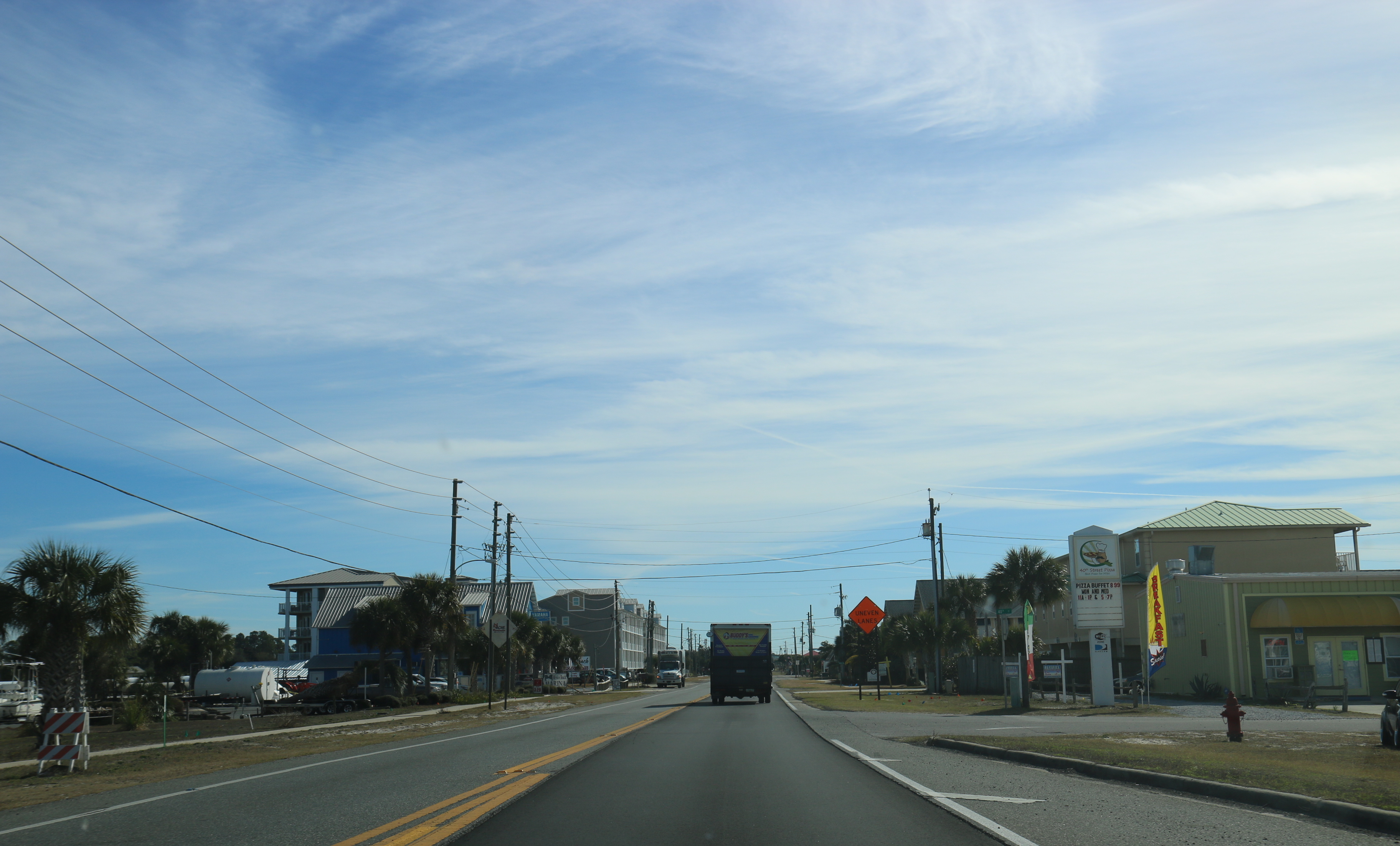
US 98 through Mexico Beach in 2018

Although physically located in Bay County, Mexico Beach is served by Gulf County Schools rather than the Bay District Schools. Mexico Beach is located within the school district boundary of Bay District schools, which then pays the Gulf County district the tuition money for Mexico Beach residents.

As of 2018 the Gulf County schools Mexico Beach students are assigned to are in Port St. Joe. These schools are Port St. Joe Elementary School and Port St. Joe High School.
