= Port St. Joe High School =

Public high school in Florida, United States

Port St. Joe Junior Senior High School

Location
- 100 Shark Drive; Port St. Joe, Florida; United States; 29°47′18″N 85°17′25″W

Information
- Type: Public
- School district: Gulf County Schools
- NCES School ID: 120069000868
- Principal: Josh Dailey
- Faculty: 31.70 (on FTE basis)
- Grades: 6 to 12
- Enrollment: 512 (2022-23)
- Student to teacher ratio: 16.15
- Colors: Gold and purple
- Nickname: Sharks
- Website: Official Homepage

Port St. Joe High School (PSJHS) is located in Port St. Joe, Florida. The school's athletic teams are known as the Sharks. It is a part of Gulf County Schools.

A previous building opened in the 1950s, and it later became the elementary school. The current facility opened in 1968. The school building was damaged by Hurricane Michael in 2018. Prior to Hurricane Michael, it had about 700 students. In 2019, the student count was 485, with some of the students being children of construction workers who moved to the area after the hurricane.

As of 2018 the Gulf County schools Mexico Beach students are assigned to are in Port St. Joe.

== Academic performance ==
It was A-rated three consecutive years as of the 2016–17 school year.

== Notable alumni ==
- Calvin Pryor, American football safety
- Roman Quinn, baseball player
