= Gulf County Schools =

School district in Florida, United States

Gulf County Schools is a school district headquartered in Port St. Joe, Florida, United States. This district's boundaries are those of Gulf County.

Additionally, it takes students from City of Mexico Beach in Bay County. Mexico Beach is located within the school district boundary of Bay District Schools, which then pays the Gulf County district the tuition money for Mexico Beach residents.

== Schools ==
Secondary (Grades 7-12):

- Port St. Joe High School (Port St. Joe) (tiger shark)
- Wewahitchka High School (Wewahitchka) (gator)

Elementary (Pre-Kindergarten-Grade 6):

- Port St. Joe Elementary School (Port St. Joe) - The building was previously that of Port St. Joe High School. It was built in the 1950s. It takes students from Mexico Beach.
- Wewahitchka Elementary School (Wewahitchka)

Jim Norton is the current superintendent of Gulf County Schools. The Gulf County School Board meets in Port Saint Joe, Florida.
