= Centennial Building =

- U.S. National Register of Historic Places
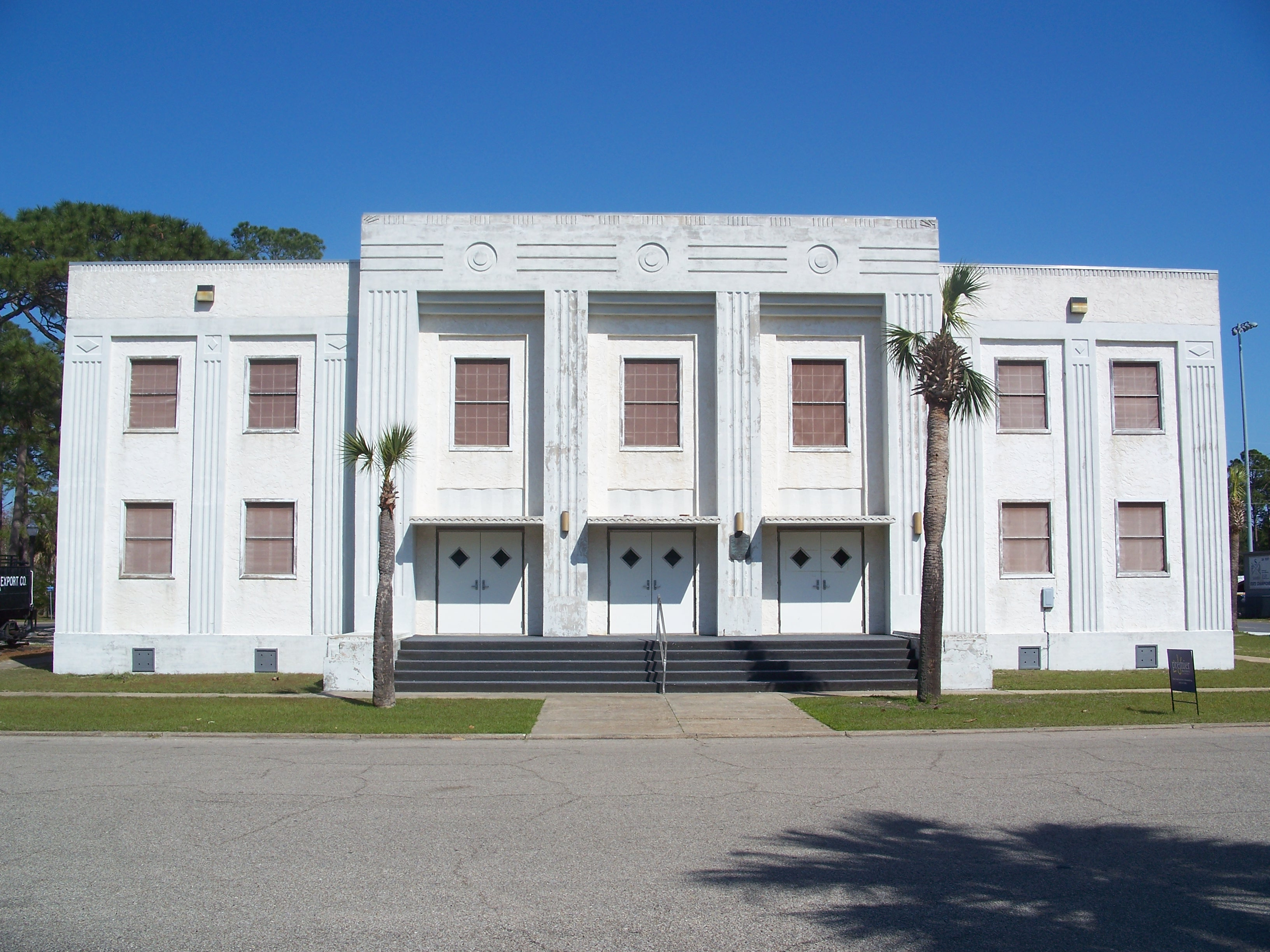

- Location within Florida Location within the United States
- Location: Port St. Joe, Florida
- Coordinates: 29°47′36″N 85°17′43″W
- NRHP reference No.: 96000230
- Added to NRHP: 12 March 1996

The Centennial Building (also known as the Civic Center) is a historic site in Port St. Joe, Florida. It is located at 300 Allen Memorial Way, across from the Constitution Convention Museum State Park. On March 12, 1996, it was added to the U.S. National Register of Historic Places.

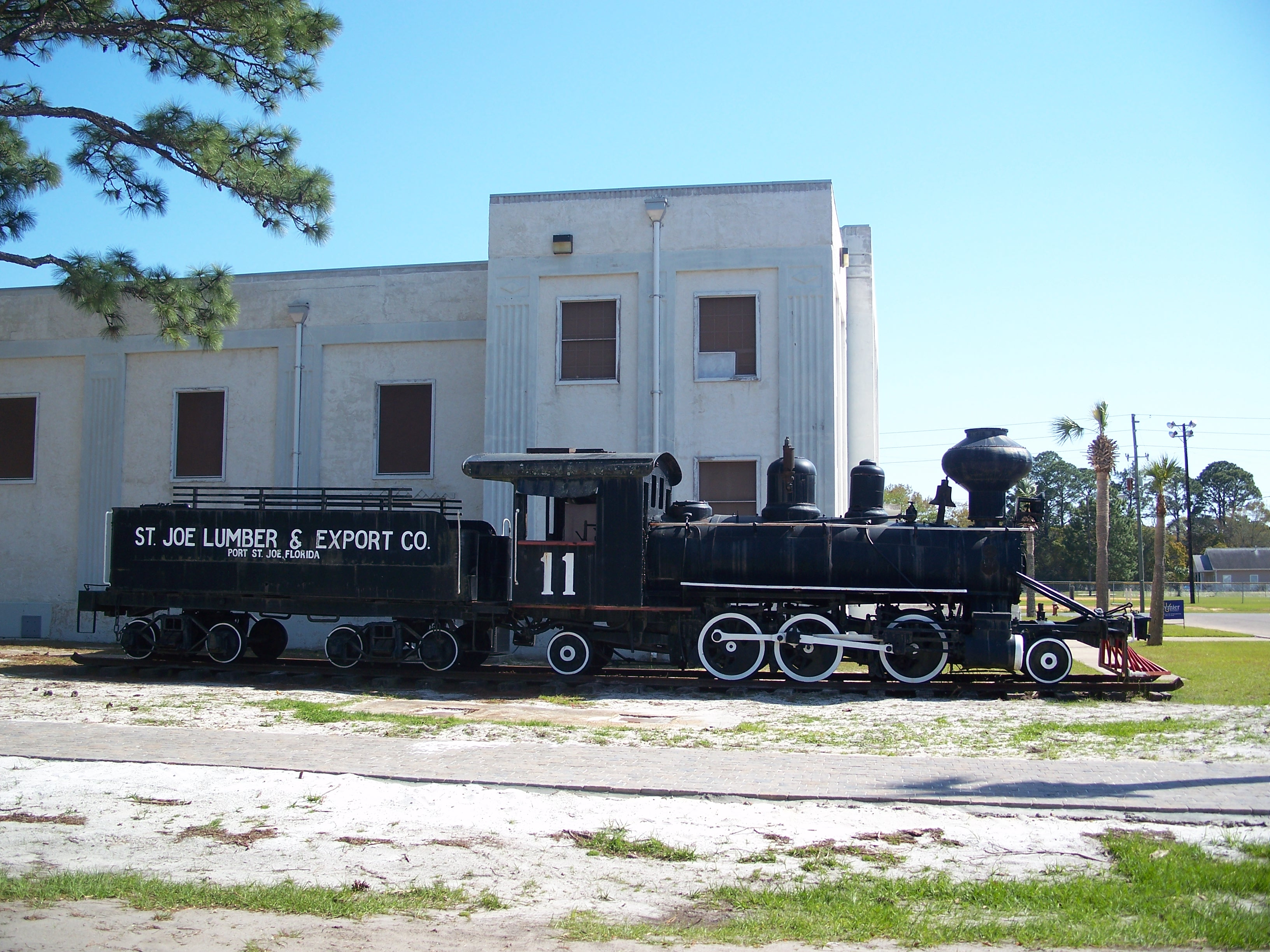

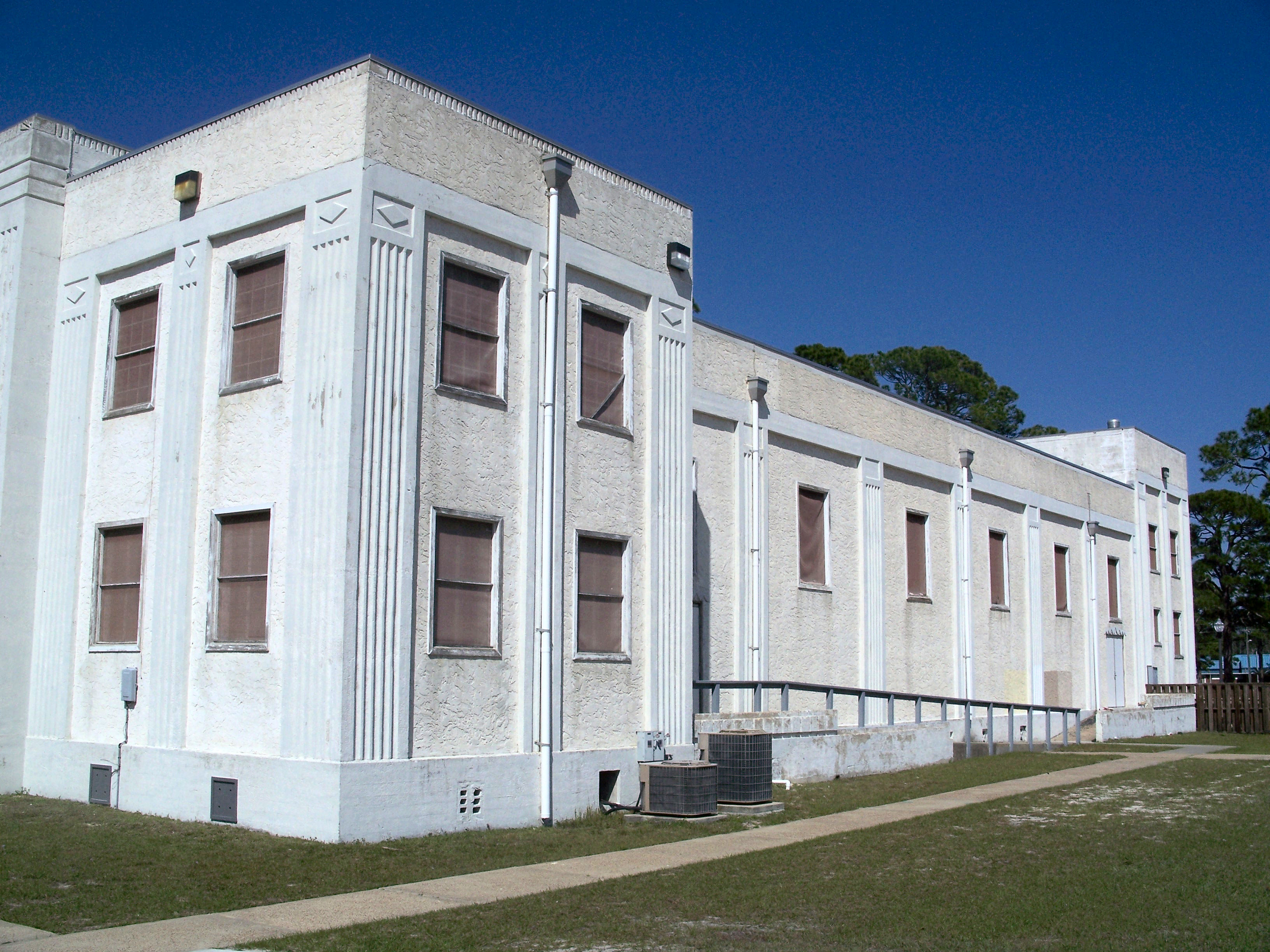

In 2024, the Centennial Building was remodeled to include roof repair, joist repair and flooring repair due to termites and water damage over the years. It typically hosts events like prom, First Baptist Church's Fifth Sunday, and Port Saint Joe Junior Service League events among others.
