= Wewahitchka Junior/Senior High School =

Public high school in Florida, United States

Wewahitchka High School

Location
- 1 Gator Circle; Wewahitchka, Florida; United States; 30.1038°N 85.1906°W

Information
- Type: Public
- Established: 1969
- School district: Gulf County Schools
- NCES School ID: 120069000870
- Principal: Karen Shiver
- Faculty: 24.00 (on FTE basis)
- Grades: 6 to 12
- Enrollment: 363 (2022-23)
- Student to teacher ratio: 15.12
- Colors: Red and white
- Mascot: Gators
- Website: wewahs.com

Wewahitchka High School is located in Wewahitchka in Gulf County, Florida. The school's teams compete as the Gators and the school is located at 1 Gator Circle.
