= WOYS =

Radio station in Carrabelle, Florida

- Carrabelle, Florida; United States
- Broadcast area: Apalachicola, Port St. Joe
- Frequency: 106.5 MHz
- Branding: Oyster Radio

Programming
- Format: Classic rock, blues, and beach music

Ownership
- Owner: Michael and Lena Allen; (East Bay Broadcasting, Inc.)

History
- First air date: August 1998
- Former call signs: WCAF (1997–1998, CP); WOCY (1998–2022)
- Call sign meaning: Oyster

Technical information
- Licensing authority: FCC
- Facility ID: 56218
- Class: C1
- ERP: 100,000 watts
- HAAT: 147 meters (482 ft)
- Transmitter coordinates: 29°43′57.00″N 84°53′24.00″W

Links
- Public license information: Public file; LMS
- Webcast: Listen live
- Website: oysterradio.com

WOYS (106.5 FM, "Oyster Radio") is a radio station broadcasting a classic rock format licensed to Carrabelle, Florida, United States, and serving Apalachicola and Port St. Joe. The station is owned by East Bay Broadcasting, Inc., and originates from studios in Eastpoint.

Prior to the current format, it had broadcast as sports, Top 40 Hitz 106, and Oyster Country.

== History ==
The station went on the air in 1998 as WOCY.

Effective February 7, 2022, Live Communications Inc., owned by the Rev. Dr. R.B. Holmes, Jr., sold the station to East Bay Broadcasting, which owned WOYS (100.5 FM). The Christian and country Cross Country format on the 106.5 frequency was dropped in order to move WOYS to the higher-power 106.5 frequency on April 1, 2022.
