= Calvin Pryor =

American football player (born 1992)

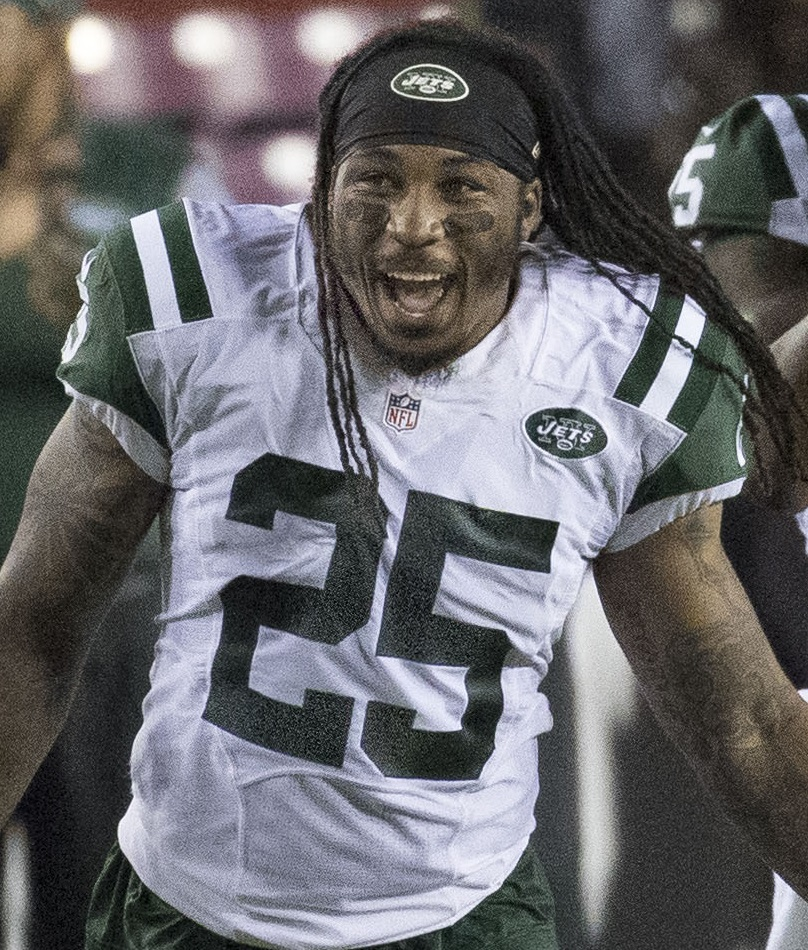
- Pryor with the New York Jets in 2016

No. 25, 35
- Position: Safety

Personal information
- Born: July 2, 1992 (age 34); Port St. Joe, Florida, U.S.
- Listed height: 5 ft 11 in (1.80 m)
- Listed weight: 207 lb (94 kg)

Career information
- High school: Port St. Joe
- College: Louisville (2011–2013)
- NFL draft: 2014: 1st round, 18th overall pick

Career history
- New York Jets (2014–2016); Cleveland Browns (2017)*; Jacksonville Jaguars (2017)
- * Offseason or practice squad member only

Awards and highlights
- Pro Football Focus All-Rookie Team (2014); First-team All-AAC (2013); Second-team All-Big East (2012)

Career NFL statistics
- Total tackles: 193
- Sacks: 0.5
- Forced fumbles: 2
- Interceptions: 2
- Stats at Pro Football Reference

Calvin Starlin Pryor III (born July 2, 1992) is an American former professional football player who was a safety in the National Football League (NFL). He was selected by the New York Jets in the first round of the 2014 NFL draft. He played college football for the Louisville Cardinals. He also spent time with the Cleveland Browns and Jacksonville Jaguars.

== Early life ==
A native of Port St. Joe, Florida, Pryor attended the local high school where he was a three-sport athlete in football, basketball and baseball. He played both running back and safety for the Tiger Sharks.

Considered a three-star by Rivals.com, Pryor was rated the 31st-best safety prospect in the nation.

== College career ==
Pryor attended the University of Louisville from 2011 to 2013. During his tenure, he accumulated 218 total tackles, including 11 for losses, two sacks, seven interceptions, and nine forced fumbles. He was a second-team All-Big East Conference selection as a sophomore, and a first-team All-American Athletic Conference (AAC) selection as a junior.

On December 29, 2013, Pryor announced that he would forgo his remaining eligibility at Louisville and enter the 2014 NFL draft.

== Professional career ==
Pre-draft measurables
Height	Weight	Arm length	Hand span	Wingspan	40-yard dash	10-yard split	20-yard split	20-yard shuttle	Three-cone drill	Vertical jump	Broad jump	Bench press
5 ft 11 1/8 in (1.81 m)	207 lb (94 kg)	31 3/8 in (0.80 m)	9 1/8 in (0.23 m)	6 ft 3 1/2 in (1.92 m)	4.58 s	1.58 s	2.66 s	4.30 s	6.98 s	34.5 in (0.88 m)	9 ft 8 in (2.95 m)	18 reps
All values from NFL Combine, except shuttle and cone drill times from Louisville Pro Day

=== New York Jets ===
Pryor was selected by the New York Jets as the 18th pick of the first round of the 2014 NFL draft.

On May 2, 2017, the Jets declined Pryor's fifth year option after the draftings of safeties Jamal Adams and Marcus Maye.

=== Cleveland Browns ===
On June 1, 2017, Pryor was traded to the Cleveland Browns in exchange for Demario Davis. He was released on September 7, 2017, due to a fight with teammate Ricardo Louis.

=== Jacksonville Jaguars ===
On September 8, 2017, Pryor was claimed off waivers by the Jacksonville Jaguars. He was placed on injured reserve on September 18, 2017. He was activated off injured reserve to the active roster on November 18, 2017. He was released by the Jaguars on December 2, 2017.

== NFL career statistics ==
Legend
**Bold**	Career high

Year	Team	Games		Tackles					Interceptions					Fumbles			
Year	Team	GP	GS	Cmb	Solo	Ast	Sck	TFL	Int	Yds	TD	Lng	PD	FF	FR	Yds	TD
2014	NYJ	**16**	11	61	36	**25**	**0.5**	1	0	0	0	0	2	0	0	0	0
2015	NYJ	13	12	**69**	**50**	19	0.0	2	**2**	**47**	0	**29**	**6**	**1**	0	0	0
2016	NYJ	15	**15**	62	45	17	0.0	**4**	0	0	0	0	**6**	**1**	0	0	0
2017	JAX	2	0	1	1	0	0.0	0	0	0	0	0	0	0	0	0	0
		46	38	193	132	61	0.5	7	2	47	0	29	14	2	0	0	0
