= Port Theatre Art and Culture Center =

- U.S. National Register of Historic Places
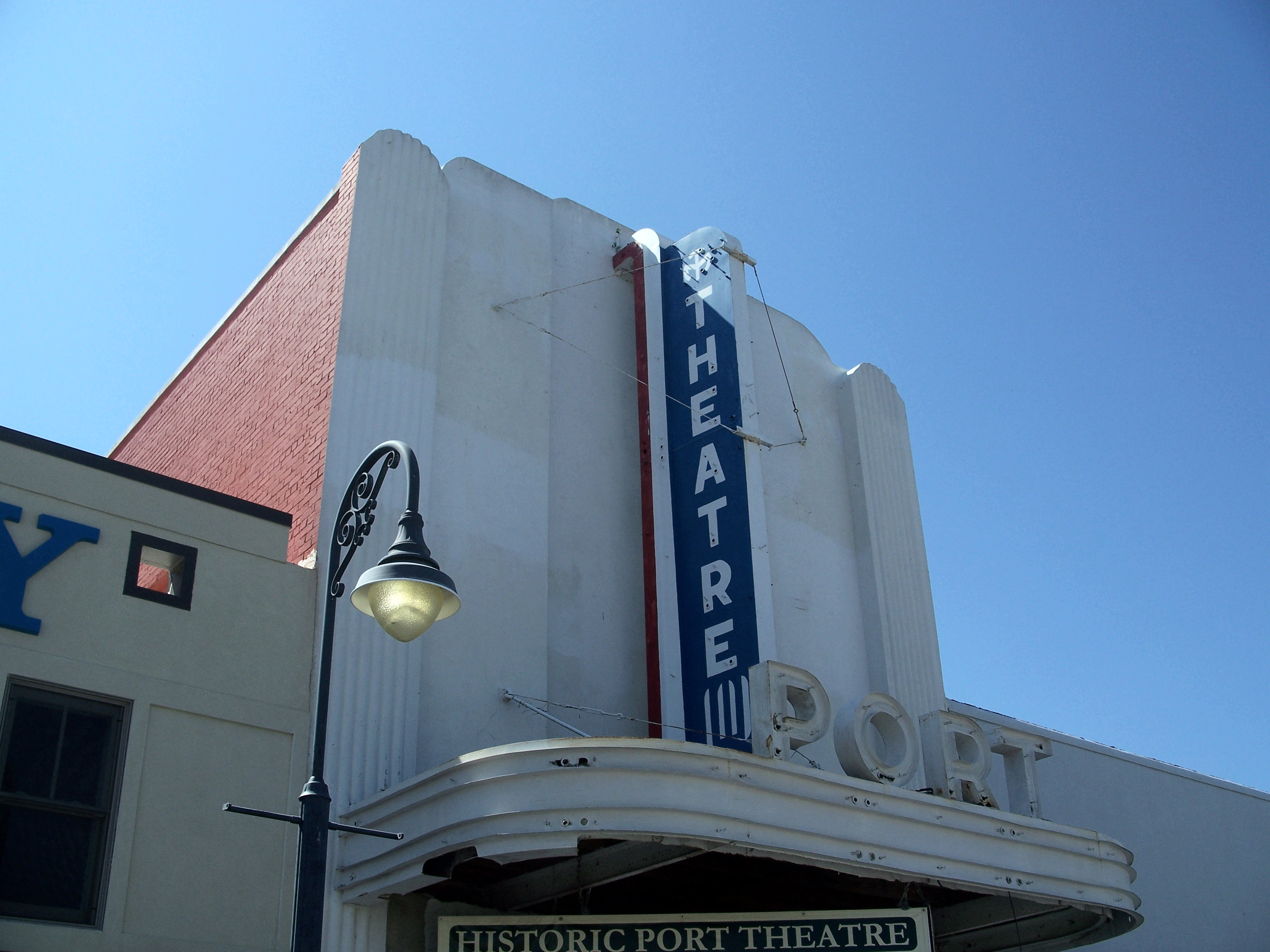

- Location within Florida Location within the United States
- Location: Port St. Joe, Florida
- Coordinates: 29°48′48″N 85°18′13″W
- NRHP reference No.: 03000508
- Added to NRHP: June 5, 2003

The Port Theatre Art and Culture Center is a historic site in Port St. Joe, Florida, located at 314 Reid Avenue. On June 5, 2003, it was added to the U.S. National Register of Historic Places.
