= St. Joseph Catholic Mission Church =

Historic church in Florida, United States

- U.S. National Register of Historic Places
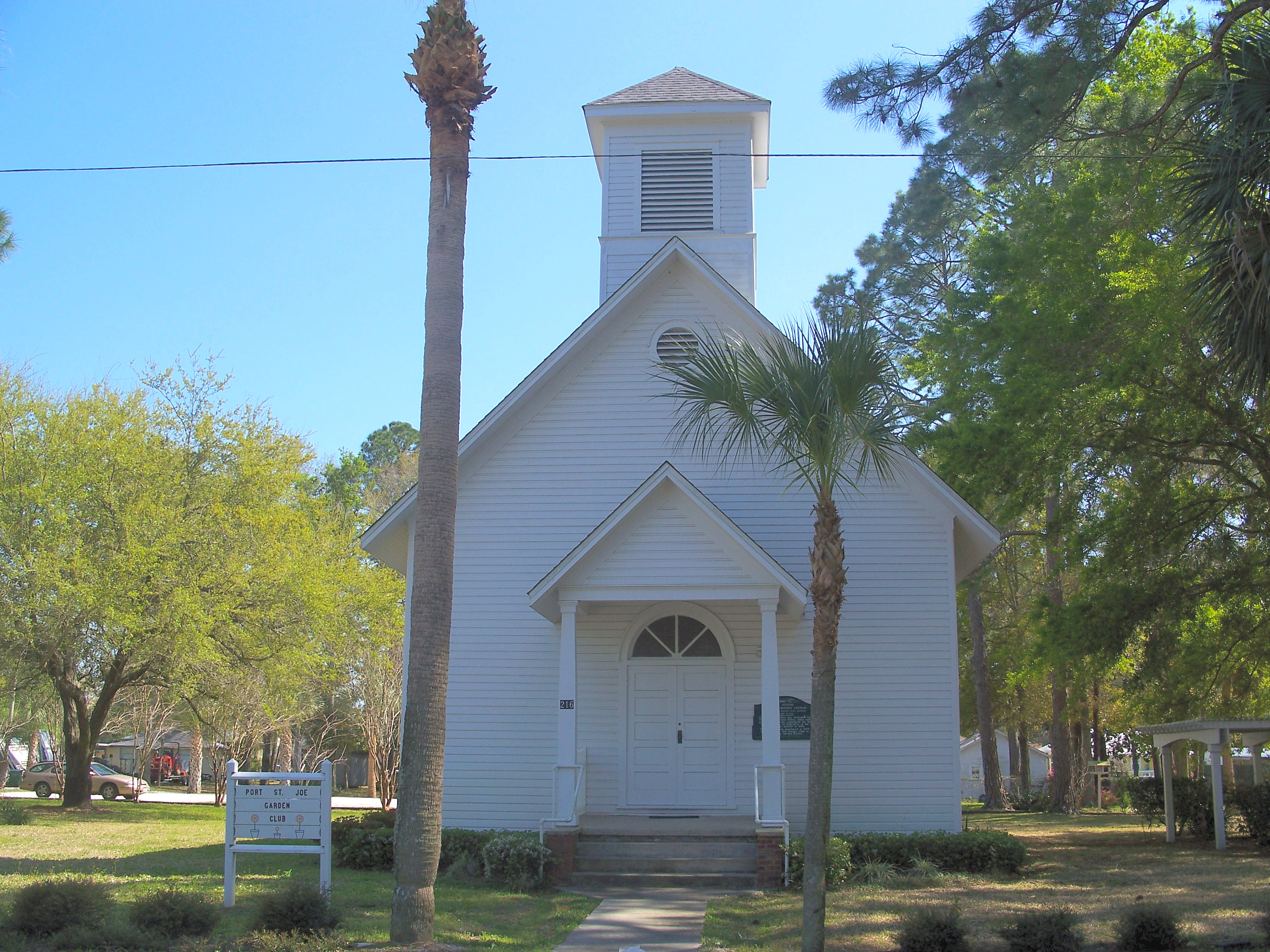

- Location within Florida Location within the United States
- Location: Port St. Joe, Florida, USA
- Coordinates: 29°48′30″N 85°18′6″W
- NRHP reference No.: 98000924
- Added to NRHP: July 31, 1998

The St. Joseph Catholic Mission Church (also known as the Port St. Joe Garden Club) is a historic site in Port St. Joe, Florida, located at 216 8th Street. On July 31, 1998, it was added to the U.S. National Register of Historic Places.
