= Constitution Convention Museum State Park =

State Park in Northwest Florida

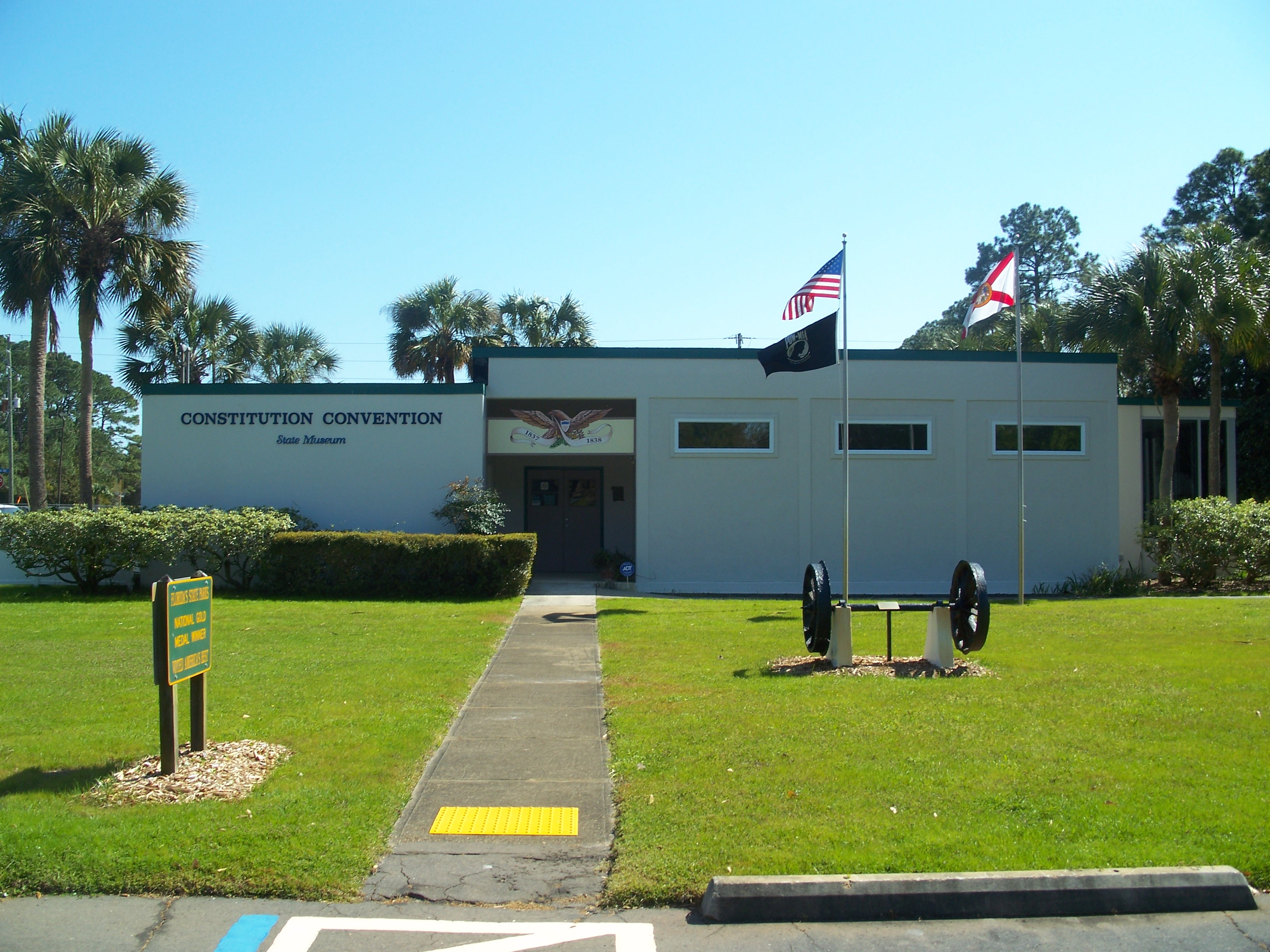
- Museum at the far end of the park

- Location within Florida Location within the United States
- Interactive map of Constitution Convention Museum State Park
- Location: Port St. Joe, Gulf County, Florida, USA
- Coordinates: 29°47′35″N 85°17′53″W
- Area: 15 acres (6.1 ha)
- Governing body: Florida Department of Environmental Protection
- Website: Florida State Parks

Constitution Convention Museum State Park is a Florida State Park located just outside Port St. Joe, off US 98, in northwestern Florida. The 14-acre (57,000 m^{2}) park contains a museum with examples of 19th-century life in the former town of St. Joseph, and features life-sized figures with audio presentations about the state's first Constitutional Convention. The address is 200 Allen Memorial Way.

== History ==
Founded in 1835 and gone by 1844, St. Joseph is notable for being the site of the first Constitutional Convention of the state of Florida in 1838. It was selected over Tallahassee (at the time the territorial capital) due to promoters of the town, as well as conflict between East Florida and Middle Florida. The more affluent Middle Floridians had long been proponents of statehood. However, the people of East and West Florida believed a state government could not yet be financially supported, so they wished Florida to remain a territory.

A group of territorial delegates met finally in St. Joseph, working from December 3, 1838, through January 11, 1839, to create the initial draft of Florida's constitution. Four more conventions were held in other locations, and Florida joined the Union in 1845, but St. Joseph has the distinction of being where Florida's statehood began.

The museum was dedicated in 1956 at a ceremony attended by Governor LeRoy Collins. Along with the John Gorrie Museum, it was one of the first two museum buildings constructed by the Florida Park Service.

== Recreational activities ==
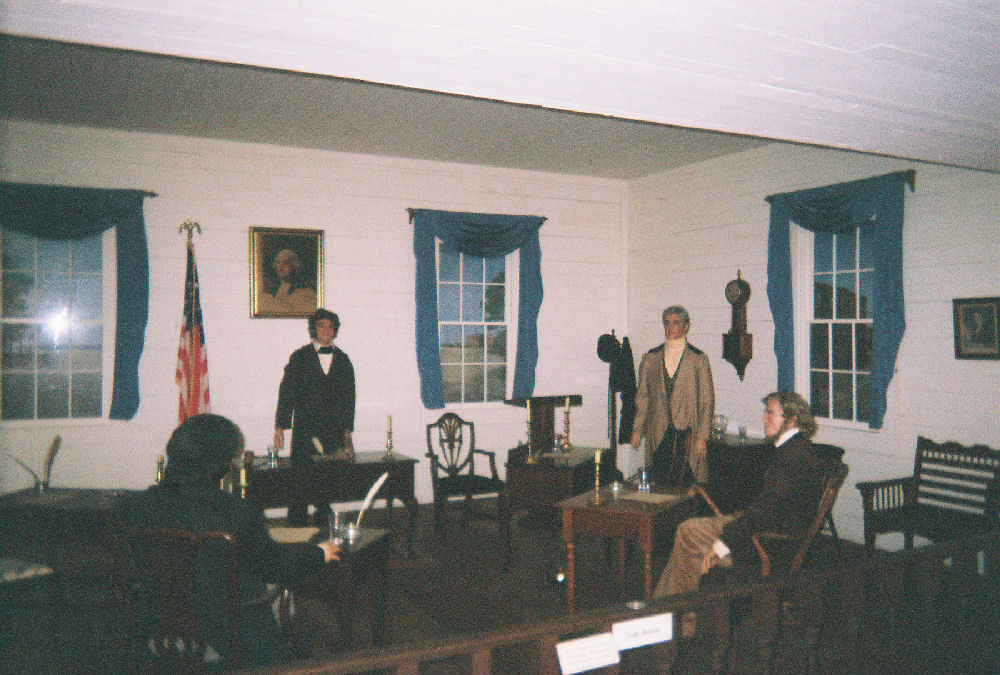
Convention hall reproduction

Besides the historical displays of town life, the park's museum also has a reproduction of the original convention hall with audio-animated life-sized recreations of some of the delegates. Visitors can see and hear facsimiles of Territorial Governors Robert Reid and William P. Duval, Senator David Y. Levy and Attorney Thomas L. Baltzell debating and framing the early constitution of Florida.

== See also ==
- St. Joseph, Florida
