= Port St. Joe, Florida =

- City
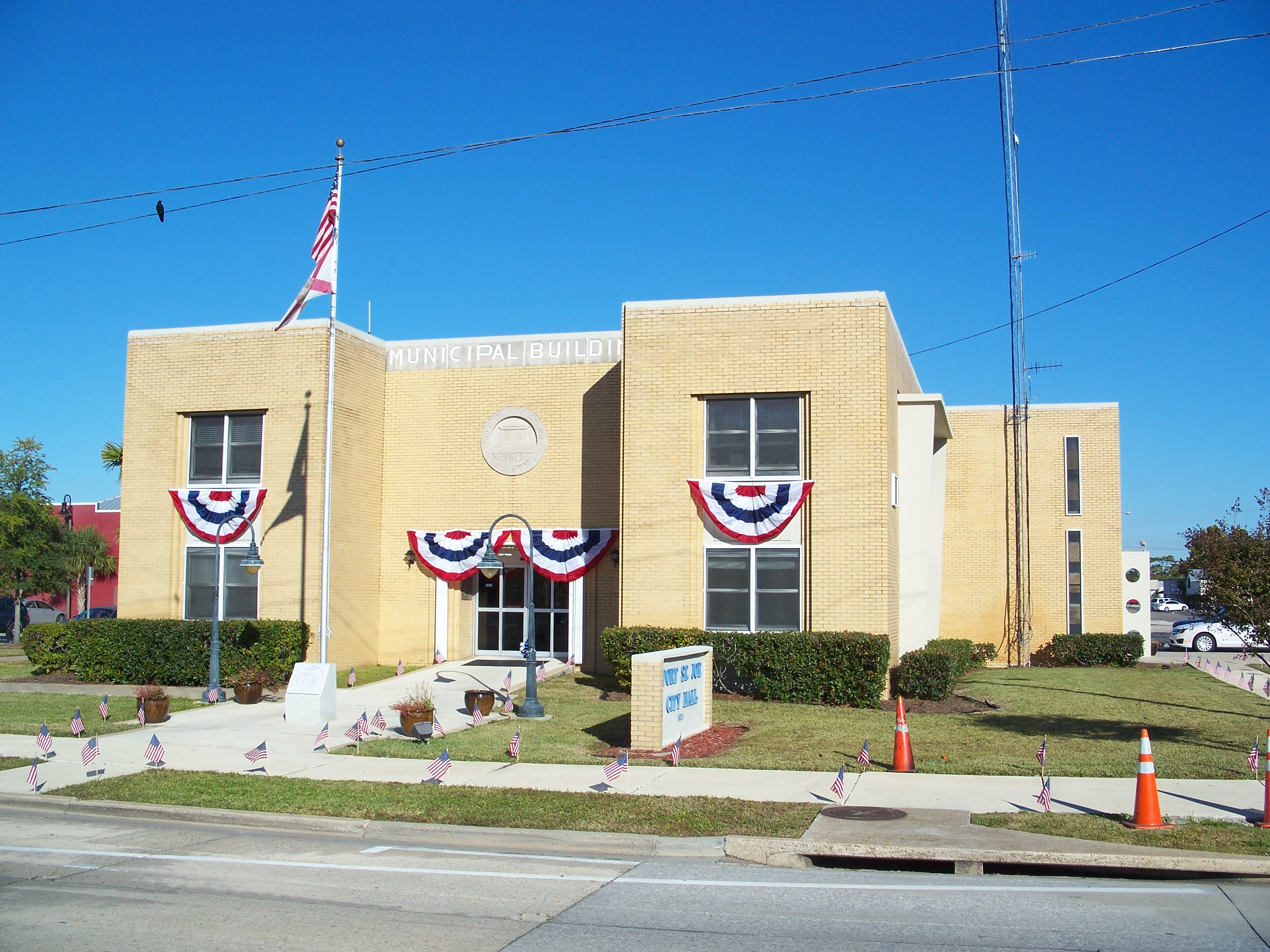
- Port St. Joe City Hall
- Nickname: St. Joe
- Motto(s): "The Constitution City" "Birthplace of the Florida Constitution" "In God We Trust"
- Location in Gulf County and the state of Florida
- Coordinates: 29°51′20″N 85°19′33″W
- Country: United States
- State: Florida
- County: Gulf
- Settled (San José) in Spanish Florida: c. 1700
- Settled (St. Joseph's or St. Joseph) in the Florida Territory: 1835–1844
- Settled (Port St. Joe): 1904–1909
- Incorporated (City of Port St. Joe): 1913
- Named for: St. Joseph Bay

Government
  - Type: Commission–Manager
  - Mayor: William "Rex" Buzzett
  - Commissioners: Scott Hoffman, Steve P. Kerigan, Brett Lowry, and Eric Langston
  - City Manager: James "Jim" A. Anderson
  - City Clerk: Charlotte M. Pierce
  - City Attorney: Clinton T. McCahill

Area
  - Total: 11.97 sq mi (30.99 km^{2})
  - Land: 9.37 sq mi (24.26 km^{2})
  - Water: 2.60 sq mi (6.73 km^{2})
- Elevation: 10 ft (3.0 m)

Population (2020)
  - Total: 3,357
  - Density: 358.4/sq mi (138.38/km^{2})
- Time zone: UTC−5 (Eastern (EST))
  - Summer (DST): UTC−4 (EDT)
- ZIP codes: 32456, 32457
- Area code(s): 850, 448
- FIPS code: 12-58675
- GNIS feature ID: 2404557
- Website: www.cityofportstjoe.com

Port St. Joe or Port Saint Joe is a city and the county seat of Gulf County, Florida, United States. It is located at the intersection of U.S. Highway 98 and State Road 71. As of the 2020 census, the population was 3,357.

== History ==
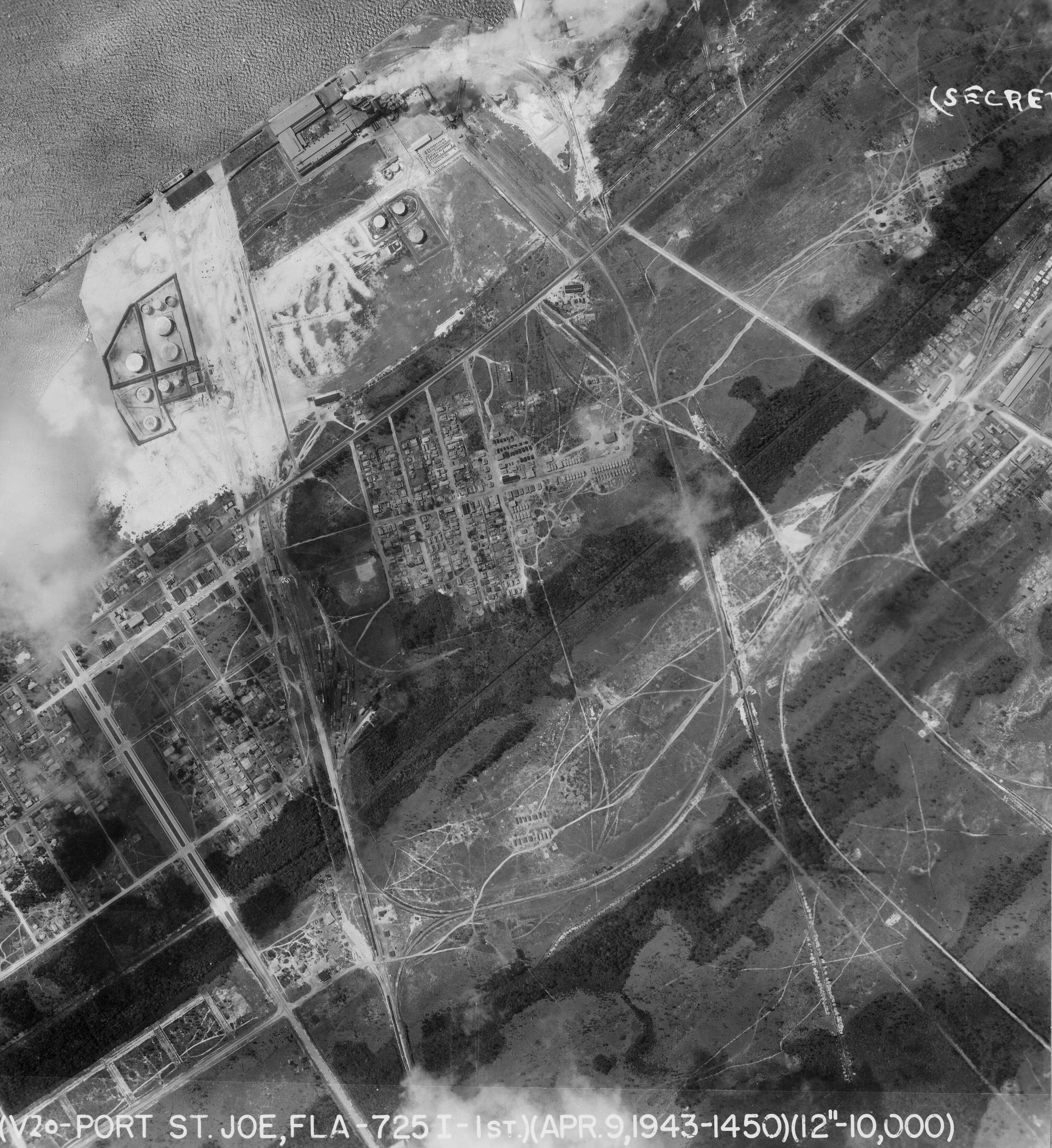
Port St. Joe, 1943

The first non-indigenous settlement of the area was around 1700, when it was Spanish Florida, and called "San José" (the Spanish name for Saint Joseph) by settlers from Spain.

During the Florida Territory era, St. Joseph (or St. Joseph's) was founded in 1835 by businessmen from nearby Apalachicola, which was troubled by legal conflict over land titles.

St. Joseph was the largest city in the Florida Territory by 1837, with an estimated population between 11,000 to 12,000 residents. This was why the location was chosen by 56 delegates to create the Constitution of Florida in order to become a state. The Florida Constitutional Convention of 1838 was a political convention that took place there between December 3, 1838 and January 11, 1839. This is why the city is still called the “Constitution City”, and uses it as one of its mottoes.

It was mostly abandoned in 1841, after a yellow fever epidemic; a storm surge produced by a hurricane in 1844 destroyed what structures remained.

On May 1, 1844, the USS General Taylor called at St. Joseph, and found a town largely deserted, with only a few residents preparing to leave, and some workers dismantling houses. Later that year a hurricane struck St. Joseph on September 9 with a large storm surge, destroying whatever remained in the abandoned town. Some who had regarded St. Joseph as a "sin city" interpreted the storm surge as a manifestation of God's wrath.

During the Civil War, Florida was a leading producer of salt for the Confederate army. On September 15, 1862, a Union army officer on board the USS Kingfisher wrote that he and his men had sent a demand to the extensive salt works at Saint Joseph that they cease production. When the work was not halted, the Kingfisher went into Saint Joseph Bay, sent at least 50 men inland, and destroyed the salt works.

In the early 20th century, a new settlement was founded close to the original after the arrival of the Apalachicola Northern Railroad in 1909. It appears that the more informal "Port St. Joe" was adopted for official use around this time.

The City of St. Joe was officially incorporated as a municipality in 1913.

The community was extensively damaged by Hurricane Michael on October 10, 2018.

== Geography ==
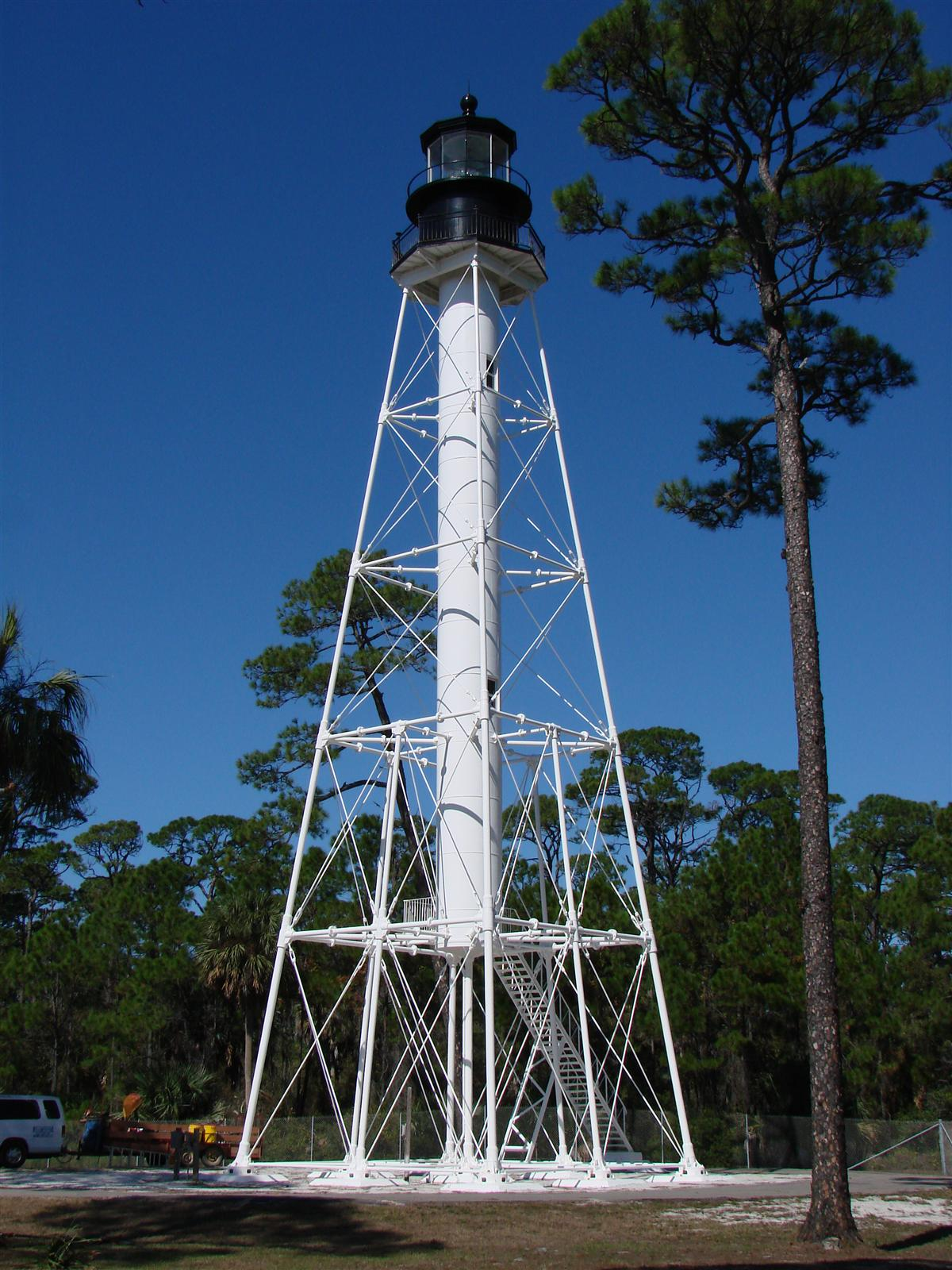
Cape San Blas Light

Port St. Joe is located in southern Gulf County within the Florida Panhandle and along the Emerald Coast in North Florida. According to the United States Census Bureau, the city has a total area of 12.1 square miles (31.3 km^{2}), of which 9.5 square miles (24.5 km^{2}) is land and 2.6 square miles (6.8 km^{2}), or 21.86%, is water. The city limits extend into St. Joseph Bay, an arm of the Gulf of Mexico.

U.S. Route 98 passes through Port St. Joe as Monument Drive in the north and Constitution Drive in the south. US 98 leads northwest along the Gulf shore 36 miles (58 km) to Panama City and southeast 23 miles (37 km) to Apalachicola. Florida State Road 71 (Cecil G. Costin Sr. Boulevard) leads northeast 24 miles (39 km) to Wewahitchka.

Port St. Joe averages only 3 feet (0.91 m) above sea level. At its highest point it is only 8 feet (2.4 m) above sea level. This portion of the town has been dubbed "Highland View".

=== Climate ===
The City of Port St. Joe is part of the humid subtropical climate zone with a Köppen Climate Classification of "Cfa" (C = mild temperate, f = fully humid, and a = hot summer).

== Demographics ==
Historical population
Census	Pop.	Note	%±
1930	851		—
1940	2,393		181.2%
1950	2,752		15.0%
1960	4,217		53.2%
1970	4,401		4.4%
1980	4,027		−8.5%
1990	4,044		0.4%
2000	3,644		−9.9%
2010	3,445		−5.5%
2020	3,357		−2.6%
U.S. Decennial Census

=== Racial and ethnic composition ===
Port St. Joe racial composition (Hispanics excluded from racial categories) (NH = Non-Hispanic)
Race	Pop 2010	Pop 2020	% 2010	% 2020
White (NH)	2,408	2,210	69.90%	65.83%
Black or African American (NH)	879	781	25.52%	23.26%
Native American or Alaska Native (NH)	10	14	0.29%	0.42%
Asian (NH)	12	25	0.35%	0.74%
Pacific Islander or Native Hawaiian (NH)	1	0	0.03%	0.00%
Some other race (NH)	1	11	0.03%	0.33%
Two or more races/Multiracial (NH)	44	145	1.28%	4.32%
Hispanic or Latino (any race)	90	171	2.61%	5.09%
Total	3,445	3,357		

=== 2020 census ===
As of the 2020 census, Port St. Joe had a population of 3,357. The median age was 48.0 years. 19.0% of residents were under the age of 18, and 25.2% were 65 years of age or older. For every 100 females, there were 98.2 males, and for every 100 females age 18 and over, there were 95.8 males.

As of 2020, 0.0% of residents lived in urban areas, while 100.0% lived in rural areas.

In 2020, there were 1,368 households in the city, of which 27.6% had children under the age of 18 living in them. Of all households, 47.3% were married-couple households, 17.5% were households with a male householder and no spouse or partner present, and 29.6% were households with a female householder and no spouse or partner present. About 27.7% of all households were made up of individuals, and 15.4% had someone living alone who was 65 years of age or older.

In 2020, there were 1,810 housing units, of which 24.4% were vacant. The homeowner vacancy rate was 2.6% and the rental vacancy rate was 16.3%.

The 2020 American Community Survey 5-year estimates reported 999 families residing in the city.

=== 2010 census ===
As of the 2010 United States census, there were 3,445 people, 1,544 households, and 946 families residing in the city.

=== 2000 census ===
As of the census of 2000, there were 3,644 people, 1,402 households, and 1,030 families residing in the city. The population density was 1,097.4 inhabitants per square mile (423.7/km^{2}). There were 1,571 housing units at an average density of 473.1 per square mile (182.7/km^{2}). The racial makeup of the city was 68.52% White, 30.10% African American, 0.22% Native American, 0.22% Asian, 0.05% from other races, and 0.88% from two or more races. Hispanic or Latino of any race were 0.55% of the population.

In 2000, there were 1,402 households, out of which 28.8% had children under the age of 18 living with them, 54.2% were married couples living together, 14.8% had a female householder with no husband present, and 26.5% were non-families. 24.9% of all households were made up of individuals, and 14.0% had someone living alone who was 65 years of age or older. The average household size was 2.48 and the average family size was 2.94.

In 2000, in the city, the population was spread out, with 23.6% under the age of 18, 6.7% from 18 to 24, 24.6% from 25 to 44, 23.6% from 45 to 64, and 21.5% who were 65 years of age or older. The median age was 42 years. For every 100 females, there were 88.4 males. For every 100 females age 18 and over, there were 80.7 males.

In 2000, the median income for a household in the city was $33,800, and the median income for a family was $39,489. Males had a median income of $30,244 versus $21,111 for females. The per capita income for the city was $16,205. About 11.2% of families and 13.0% of the population were below the poverty line, including 16.2% of those under age 18 and 11.7% of those age 65 or over.

== Education ==
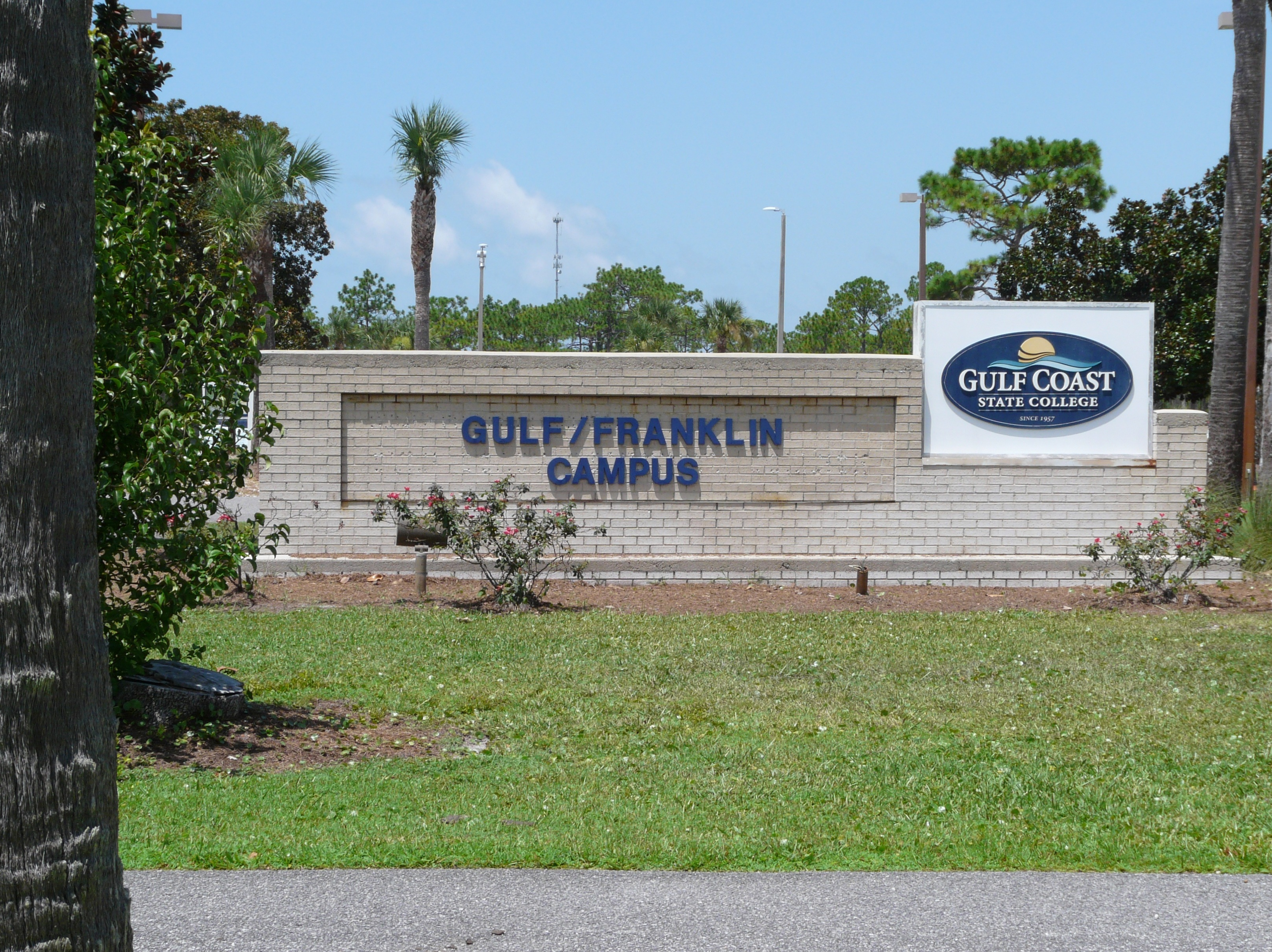
Gulf/Franklin Campus of Gulf Coast State College

Port St. Joe is within the Gulf County Schools school district.

- Port St. Joe Elementary School
- Port St. Joe High School
- Gulf Academy (adult education)

Private schools:

- Faith Christian School

Colleges and universities:

- Gulf Coast State College, Gulf/Franklin Campus - part of the Florida College System

=== Library ===
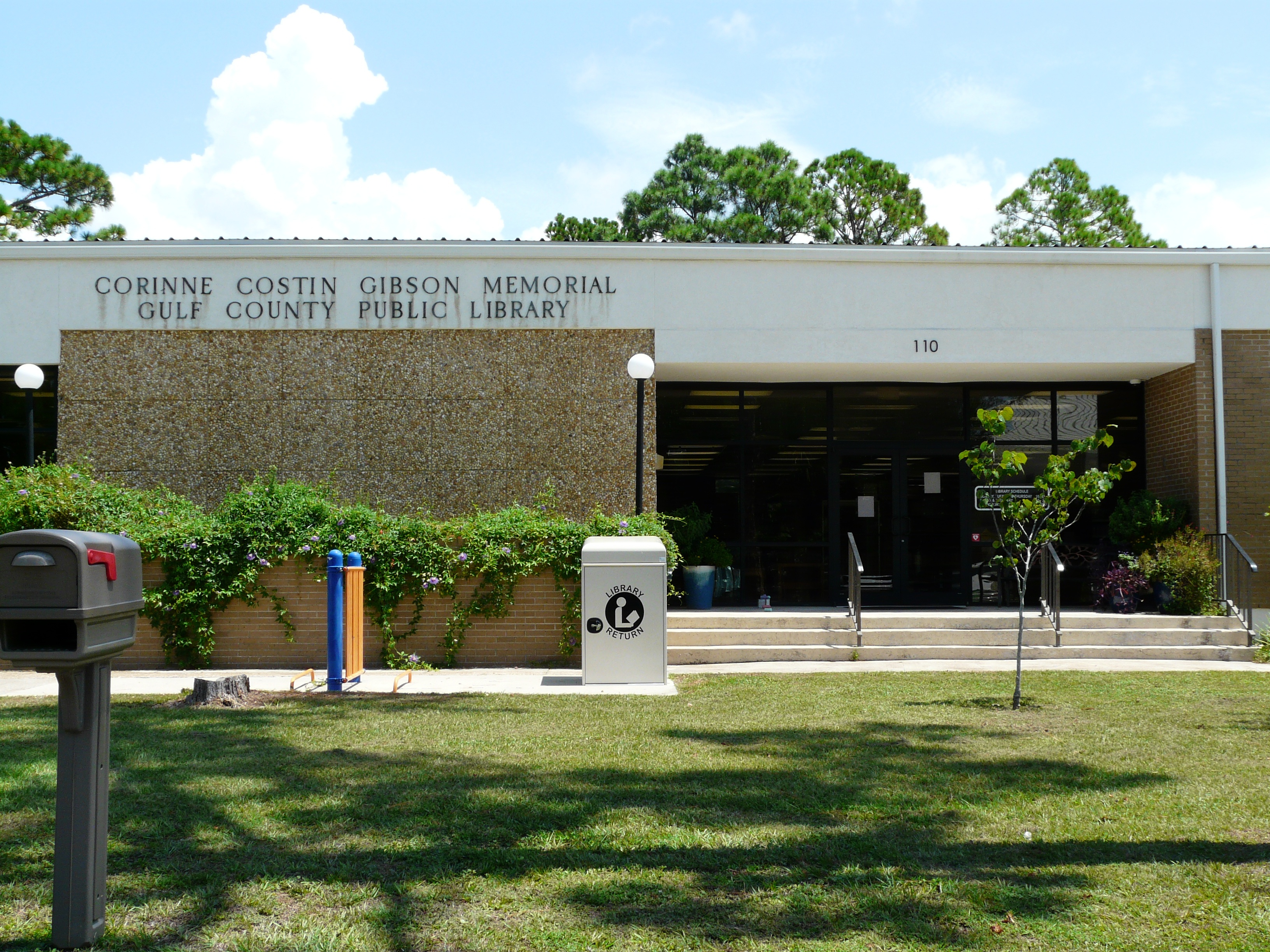
Library

The Corinne Costin Gibson Memorial Public Library is a part of the Northwest Regional Library System. The library is co-located with the senior citizens center, sheriff's office, courthouse, and animal shelter off State Road 71.

== Points of interest ==
- Constitution Convention Museum State Park
- Centennial Building
- Port Theatre Art and Culture Center
- St. Joseph Catholic Mission Church

== Local media ==
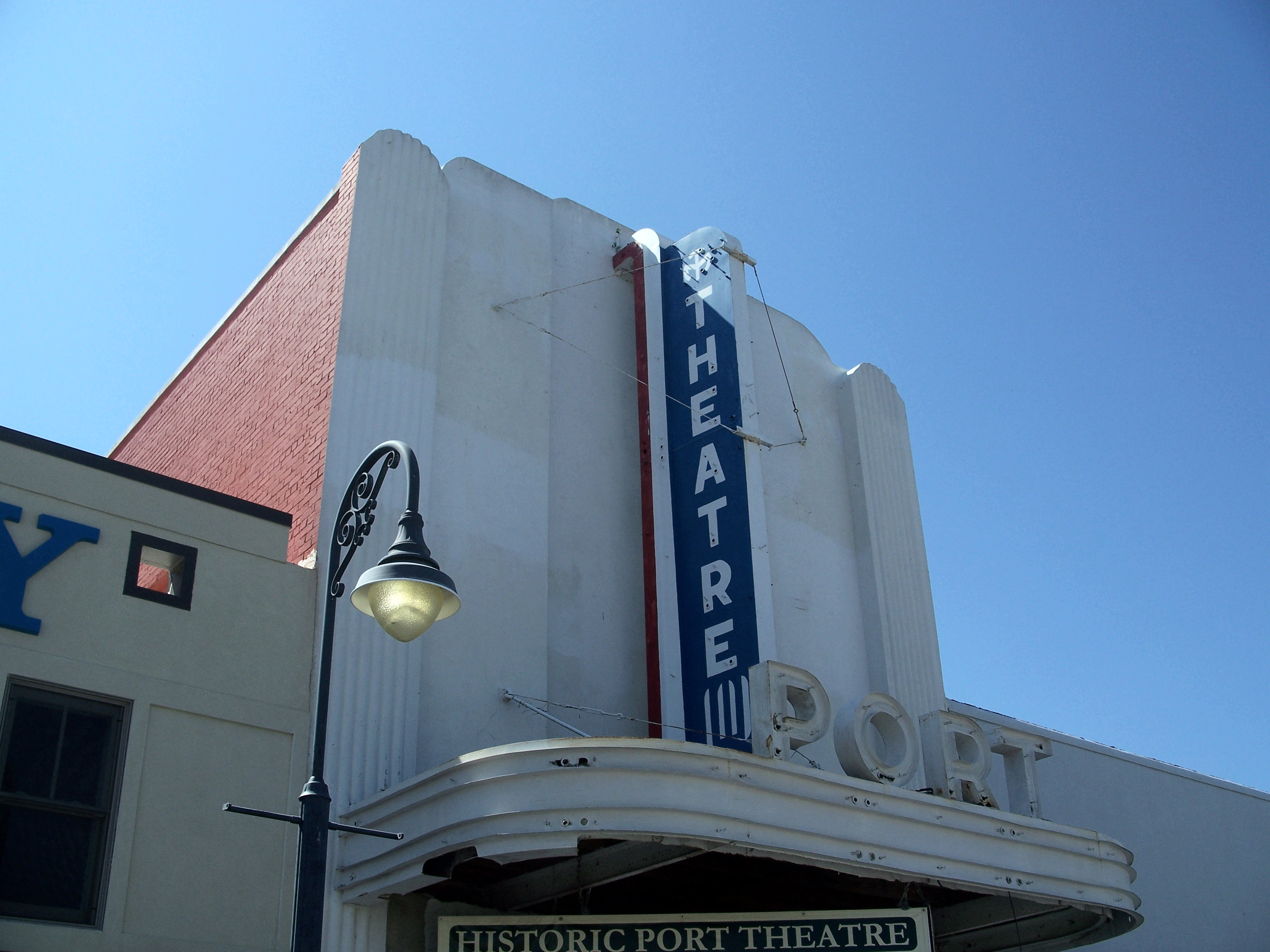
Port Theatre

=== Radio ===
- WEBZ 99.3 FM (Urban)
- W216BT 91.1 FM (repeater of WFSW-FM, Panama City)
- WDBW-LP, 97.3 FM (Long Avenue Baptist Church, repeater of Bible Broadcasting Network)
- WOYS 106.5 FM Classic Rock/Blues/Beach Music
- WFCX 100.5 FM Tropical Rock

=== Newspaper ===
- The Star was formerly headquartered in Port St. Joe. As of 2026 the headquarters are in Apalachicola.

== Transportation ==
=== Water ===
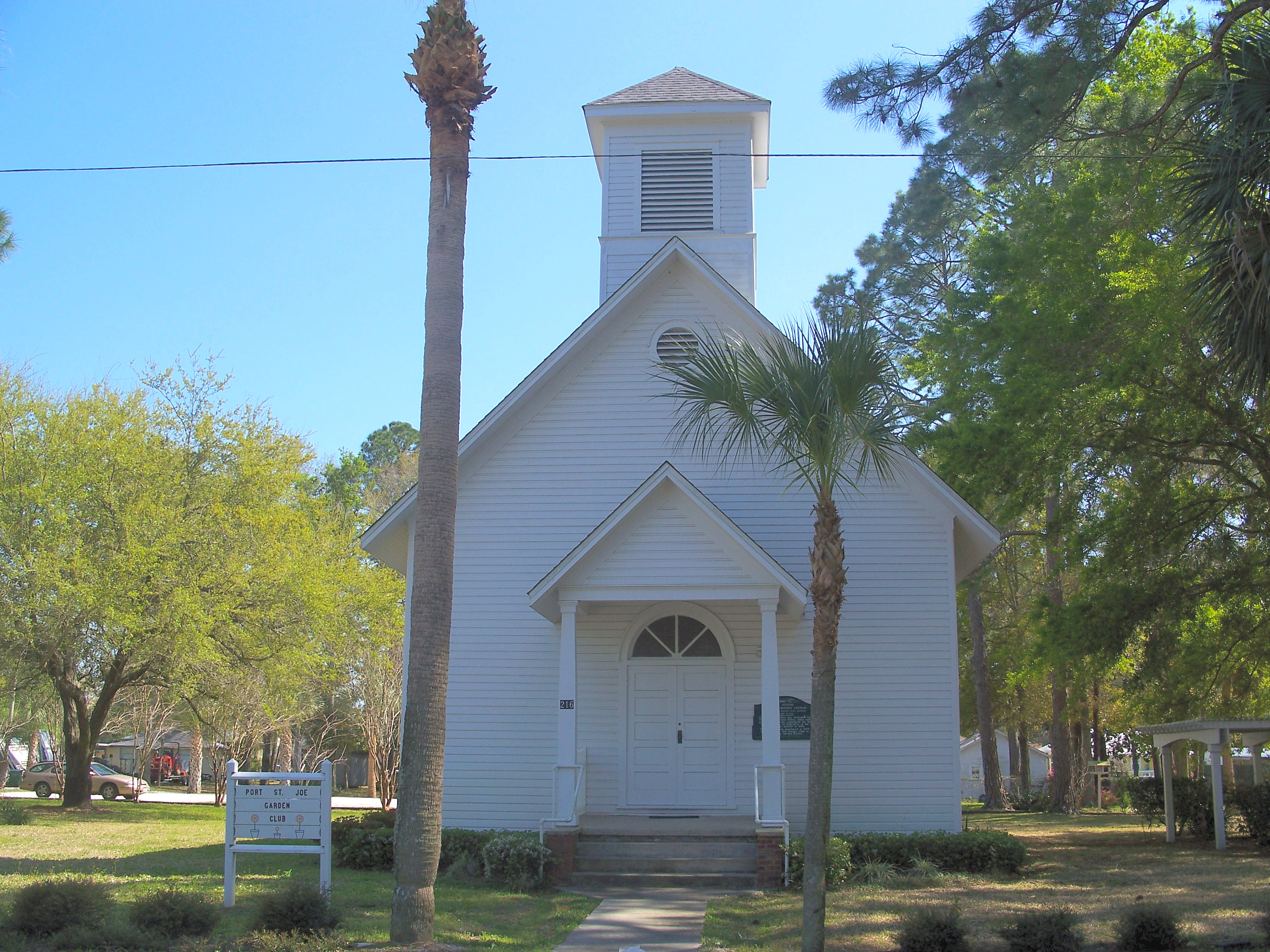
St. Joseph Catholic Mission Church

The Gulf Intracoastal Waterway (GIWW), a federally maintained canal with a channel of 12 feet (3.7 m) deep by 125 feet (38 m) wide, connects Port St. Joe to Panama City and Apalachicola.

The Port of Port St. Joe shipping channel is congressionally authorized to a depth of 35 feet (11 m) and connects to the shipping lanes of the Gulf of Mexico. Existing facilities include a manufacturer of chemical lime from dolomite, a chemical plant, a 9 million ton/year dry bulk barge-to-rail transloading terminal, and a builder of dive-cruise ships.

=== Rail ===
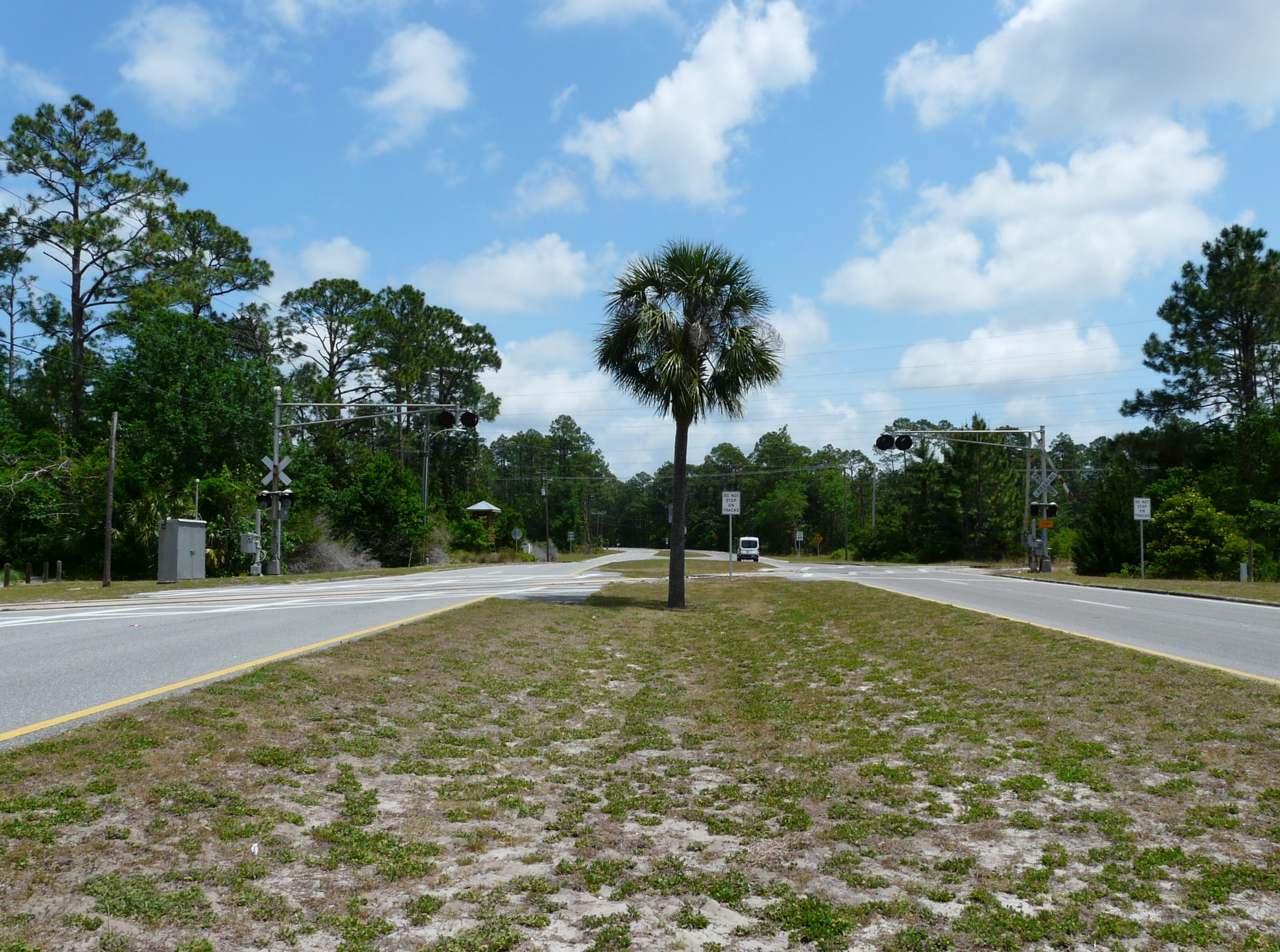
AN Railway crossing Florida State Road 71

The AN Railway previously served the industries and port of Port St. Joe and had a history of transporting a variety of products including wood chips and other forest products, chemicals, and coal. In light of the latter, most of its 96-mile (154 km) mainline consisted of heavy duty, 140-pound (64 kg) rail on concrete ties. The AN connected with the Class I CSX Transportation at Chattahoochee, Florida. There is currently no rail service in Port St. Joe.

=== Highway ===
U.S. Route 98 along the coast and through Port St. Joe providing a route west to Panama City and east to Apalachicola. State Road 71 connects Port St. Joe northward toward Alabama and Georgia, including providing access to Interstate 10 which is 72 miles (116 km) away.

== Notable people ==
- Joshua Farmer, NFL defensive end
- Greg Lewis, retired NFL running back
- Calvin Pryor former NFL strong safety
- Roman Quinn, MLB player
- Jason Shoaf, member of the Florida House of Representatives
- Clifford Chester Sims, United States Army soldier and Medal of Honor recipient

== Gallery ==
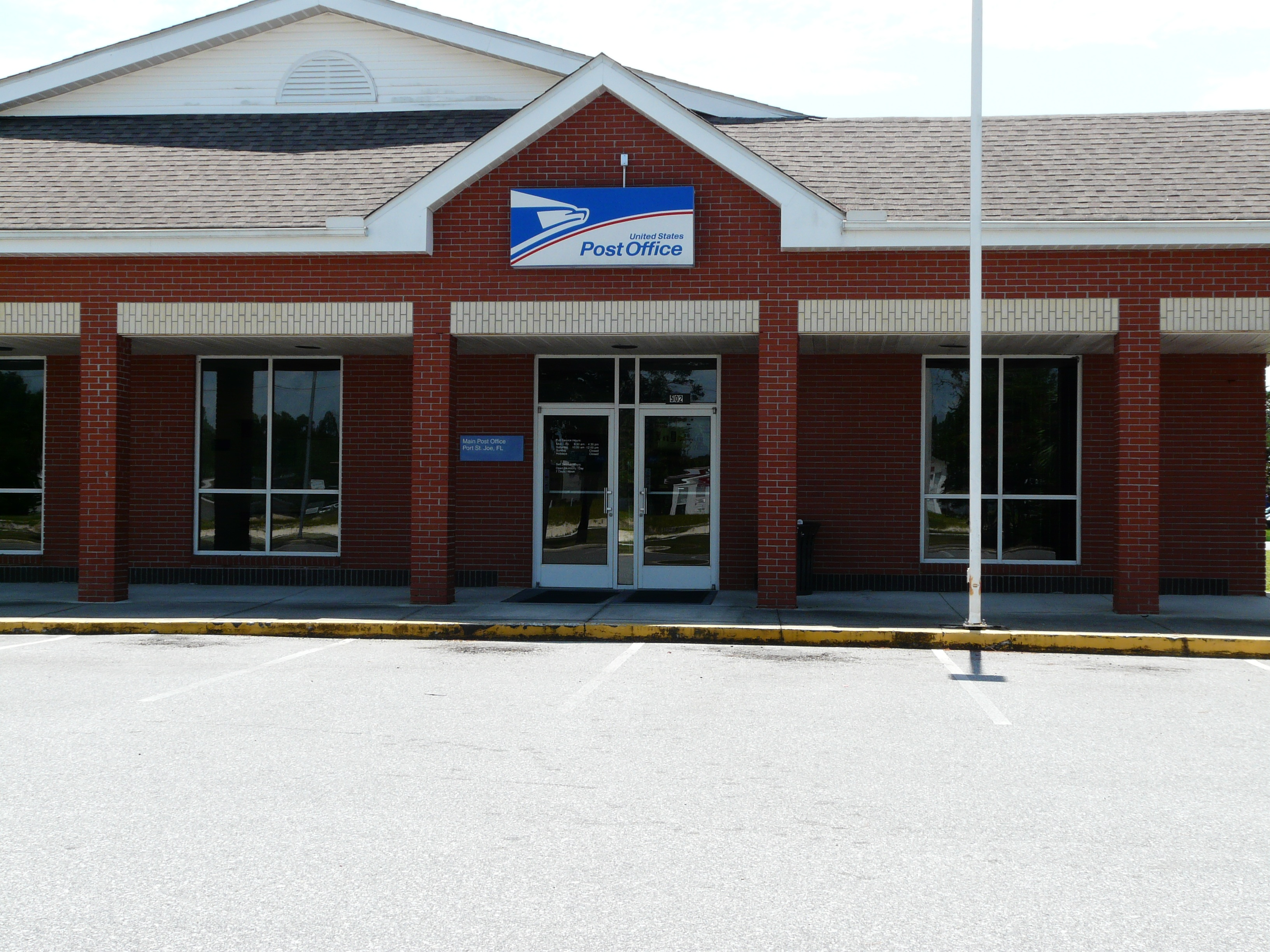
Post office

== See also ==
- St. Joseph, Florida
