= National Register of Historic Places listings in Gadsden County, Florida =

Location of Gadsden County in Florida

This is a list of the National Register of Historic Places listings in Gadsden County, Florida.

This is intended to be a complete list of the properties and districts on the National Register of Historic Places in Gadsden County, Florida, United States. The locations of National Register properties and districts for which the latitude and longitude coordinates are included below, may be seen in a map.

There are 18 properties and districts listed on the National Register in the county.

This National Park Service list is complete through NPS recent listings posted August 7, 2026.

Contents: Counties in Florida (non-linked contain no National Register listings)
Alachua - Baker - Bay - Bradford - Brevard - Broward - Calhoun - Charlotte - Citrus - Clay - Collier - Columbia - DeSoto - Dixie - Duval - Escambia - Flagler - Franklin - Gadsden - Gilchrist - Glades - Gulf - Hamilton - Hardee - Hendry - Hernando - Highlands - Hillsborough (Tampa) - Holmes - Indian River - Jackson - Jefferson - Lafayette - Lake - Lee - Leon - Levy - Liberty - Madison - Manatee - Marion - Martin - Miami-Dade (Miami) - Monroe - Nassau - Okaloosa - Okeechobee - Orange - Osceola - Palm Beach - Pasco - Pinellas - Polk - Putnam - St. Johns - St. Lucie - Santa Rosa - Sarasota - Seminole - Sumter - Suwannee - Taylor - Union - Volusia - Wakulla - Walton - Washington

== Current listings ==
	Name on the Register	Image	Date listed	Location	City or town	Description
1	Chattahoochee Historic District	Chattahoochee Historic District	September 4, 2020 (#100005240)	North Bolivar and Decatur Sts., East Washington St., South McDonald Ave., and East Chattahoochee St. 30°42′19″N 84°50′51″W	Chattahoochee	
2	Joshua Davis House	Joshua Davis House	May 21, 1975 (#75000554)	2½ miles northwest of Mt. Pleasant on U.S. Route 90; 30°41′19″N 84°43′20″W	Mount Pleasant	
3	Dezell House	Dezell House	May 10, 2006 (#06000358)	328 East 8th Street; 30°34′00″N 84°44′38″W	Greensboro	
4	Willoughby Gregory House	Willoughby Gregory House	December 16, 1983 (#83003520)	Highway 274 and Krausland Road; 30°33′29″N 84°36′43″W	Quincy	
5	Gretna School	Gretna School	June 10, 2008 (#08000502)	722 Church Street; 30°37′01″N 84°39′10″W	Gretna	
6	E. C. Love House	E. C. Love House	December 30, 1974 (#74000626)	219 North Jackson Street; 30°35′26″N 84°34′45″W	Quincy	
7	John Lee McFarlin House	John Lee McFarlin House	December 27, 1974 (#74000627)	305 East King Street; 30°35′26″N 84°34′22″W	Quincy	
8	Dr. Malcolm Nicholson Farmhouse	Dr. Malcolm Nicholson Farmhouse	October 28, 1994 (#94001272)	Northern side of State Road 12, west of Havana; 30°36′39″N 84°28′14″W	Havana	
9	Northside High School	Northside High School	February 4, 2019 (#100003408)	264 Carver Ave. 30°38′17″N 84°24′46″W	Havana	
10	Old Philadelphia Presbyterian Church	Old Philadelphia Presbyterian Church	February 24, 1975 (#75000557)	5 miles north of Quincy off State Road 65; 30°38′37″N 84°34′38″W	Quincy	
11	Planter's Exchange, Inc.	Planter's Exchange, Inc.	September 17, 1999 (#99001147)	204 Second Street, Northwest; 30°37′28″N 84°25′02″W	Havana	
12	Quincy Historic District	Quincy Historic District	November 9, 1978 (#78000942)	Roughly bounded by Sharon, Clark, Stewart, and Corry Streets; 30°35′28″N 84°34′30″W	Quincy	
13	Quincy Library	Quincy Library	September 9, 1974 (#74000628)	303 North Adams Street; 30°35′28″N 84°34′37″W	Quincy	
14	Quincy Woman's Club	Quincy Woman's Club	March 10, 1975 (#75000555)	300 North Calhoun Street; 30°35′27″N 84°34′51″W	Quincy	
15	E. B. Shelfer House	E. B. Shelfer House	April 4, 1975 (#75000556)	205 North Madison Street; 30°35′25″N 84°34′31″W	Quincy	
16	Stockton-Curry House	Stockton-Curry House	December 31, 1974 (#74000629)	121 North Duval Street; 30°35′23″N 84°34′28″W	Quincy	
17	U.S. Arsenal-Officers Quarters	U.S. Arsenal-Officers Quarters	July 2, 1973 (#73000578)	Florida State Hospital, U.S. Route 90; 30°42′24″N 84°50′12″W	Chattahoochee	
18	Judge P. W. White House	Judge P. W. White House	December 5, 1972 (#72000319)	212 North Madison Street; 30°35′27″N 84°34′34″W	Quincy	

== Former listings ==
	Name on the Register	Image	Date listed	Date removed	Location	City or town	Description
1	Malachi Martin House		August 11, 1976 (#76000597)	June 2, 1989	5 mi. E of Chattahoochee off U.S. 90	Chattahoochee vicinity	Burned down in 1986

== See also ==
- List of National Historic Landmarks in Florida
- National Register of Historic Places listings in Florida
