= Elizabeth Bellamy (disambiguation) =

Elizabeth Bellamy may refer to:

- Elizabeth Bellamy, fictional character
- Elizabeth Bellamy (missionary) (1845–1940), New Zealand Anglican missionary
- Elizabeth Whitfield Croom Bellamy (1837–1900), American writer
