= Robert H. M. Davidson =

American politician (1832-1908)

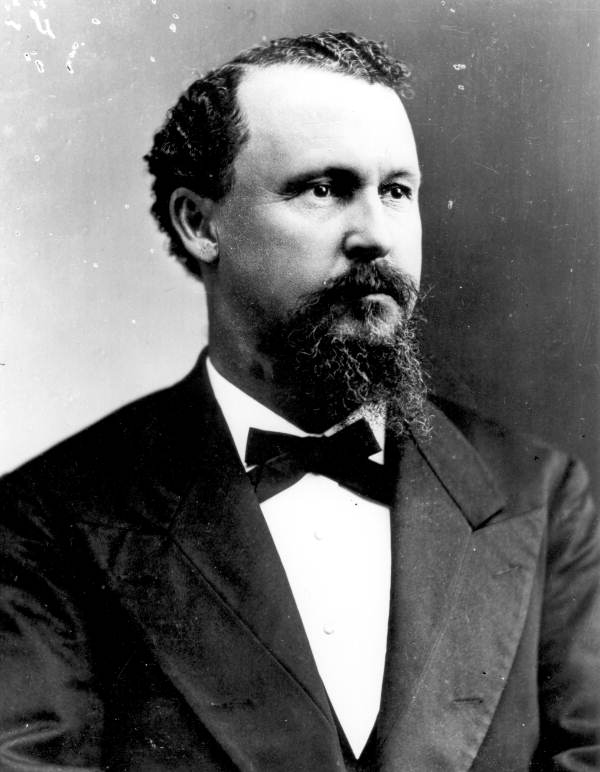

Member of the U.S. House of Representatives from Florida's 1st district
- In office March 4, 1877 – March 3, 1891
- Preceded by: William J. Purman
- Succeeded by: Stephen Mallory II

Member of the Florida House of Representatives
- In office 1856 – 1859

Member of the Florida Senate
- In office 1860 – 1862

Personal details
- Born: September 23, 1832 Near Quincy, Florida
- Died: January 18, 1908 (aged 75) Quincy, Florida, U.S.
- Party: Democratic
- Education: University of Virginia
- Profession: Lawyer, Politician

Military service
- Allegiance: Confederate States of America
- Branch/service: Confederate States Army
- Years of service: 1862–1865
- Rank: Lieutenant Colonel
- Battles/wars: American Civil War

Robert Hamilton McWhorta Davidson (September 23, 1832 – January 18, 1908) was a U.S. representative from Florida.

== Biography ==
Born near Quincy, Florida, Davidson attended the common schools and the Quincy Academy in Quincy, Florida. He studied law at the University of Virginia, Charlottesville, Virginia. He was admitted to the bar in 1853 and commenced practice in Quincy, Florida. He served as member of the State house of representatives 1856–1859. He served in the State senate 1860–1862. He retired from the State senate in 1862 and served during the Civil War in the Confederate States Army as captain of Infantry and later with rank of lieutenant colonel. He served as member of the State constitutional convention in 1865.

Davidson was elected as a Democrat to the Forty-fifth and to the six succeeding Congresses (March 4, 1877 – March 3, 1891). He served as chairman of the Committee on Railways and Canals (Forty-eighth through Fiftieth Congresses). He was an unsuccessful candidate for renomination in 1890 to the Fifty-second Congress. He served as member of the State railroad commission in 1897 and 1898. Also member of the Florida Public Service Commission (July 1, 1897 - January 3, 1899). He engaged in the practice of his profession until his death in Quincy, Florida, January 18, 1908. He was interred in Western Cemetery.

== Notes ==
U.S. House of Representatives
Preceded by William J. Purman	Member of the U.S. House of Representatives from Florida's 1st congressional district 1877 – 1891	Succeeded by Stephen Mallory II
