= Freddie Figgers =

American technology entrepreneur

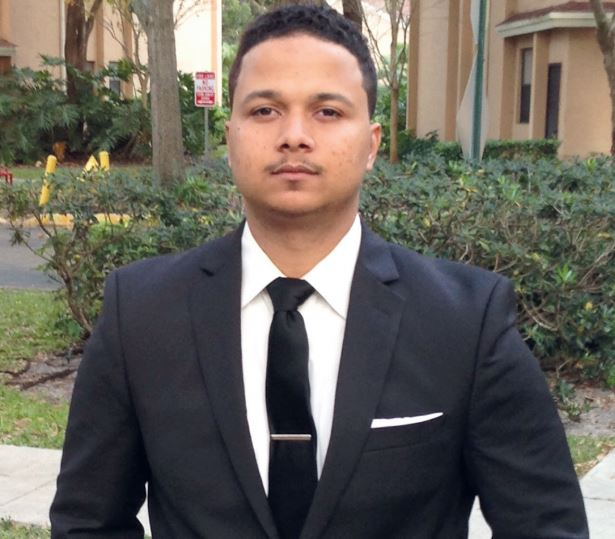
- Headshot of Freddie Figgers
- Born: September 26, 1989 (age 37); Gadsden County, Florida
- Occupation: CEO of Figgers Communication
- Spouse(s): Natlie G. Figgers, Esq. (2015–present)
- Children: 1
- Parent: Nathan Figgers (adoptive father) Betty Mae Figgers (adoptive mother)
- Website: FreddieFiggers.com

Freddie Figgers (born September 26, 1989) is an American technology entrepreneur, inventor, and founder of Figgers Communication and the Figgers Foundation.

== Life and career ==
Freddie Figgers was abandoned at birth and adopted in two days by Nathan Figgers. Nathan was a maintenance worker and handyman, while his wife, Betty Mae, was a farm worker. Freddie grew up in Quincy, Florida. As a child he enjoyed repairing old electrical equipment. His first computer repair was a broken Macintosh he acquired when he was nine and fixed by soldering parts from a clock radio to the circuit board. When he was twelve, he began repairing and maintaining computers at his school during an after-school program. The program's director, who was the mayor, then hired him to repair computers at city hall. Later, Freddie wrote a program to check water pressure gauges. He then left school at fifteen to go into business, repairing computers in a backyard shed. He launched his own cloud storage service in 2005. He financed subsequent expansion by writing software for clients.

Figgers' inventions include a GPS tracker that he embedded together with a two-way communicator in the sole of his father's shoe after Nathan Figgers developed Alzheimer's disease and started to wander; he sold the rights to the tracker for $2.2 million in January 2014, but his father died the same month.

Following the death of his uncle, a diabetic, he also developed a networked glucometer, to transmit users' glucose levels to a designated relative and their physician and it created an alert in case of abnormalities.

At sixteen, Figgers started Figgers Communication. In 2008, when he was nineteen, he started Figgers Wireless and began applying to the FCC for a telecommunications license to provide internet service to rural areas in northern Florida and adjacent southern Georgia. When he received a license in 2011, at 21, he was the youngest telecom operator in the United States, and as of February 2020, Figgers Communication was the only Black-owned telecom in the country.

== Personal life ==
Figgers is married to Natlie Figgers, an attorney; they have a daughter. He runs a foundation that assists disadvantaged children and families and provides grants for education and healthcare projects.
