= Leaf Theater =

Theater in Quincy, Florida, U.S.

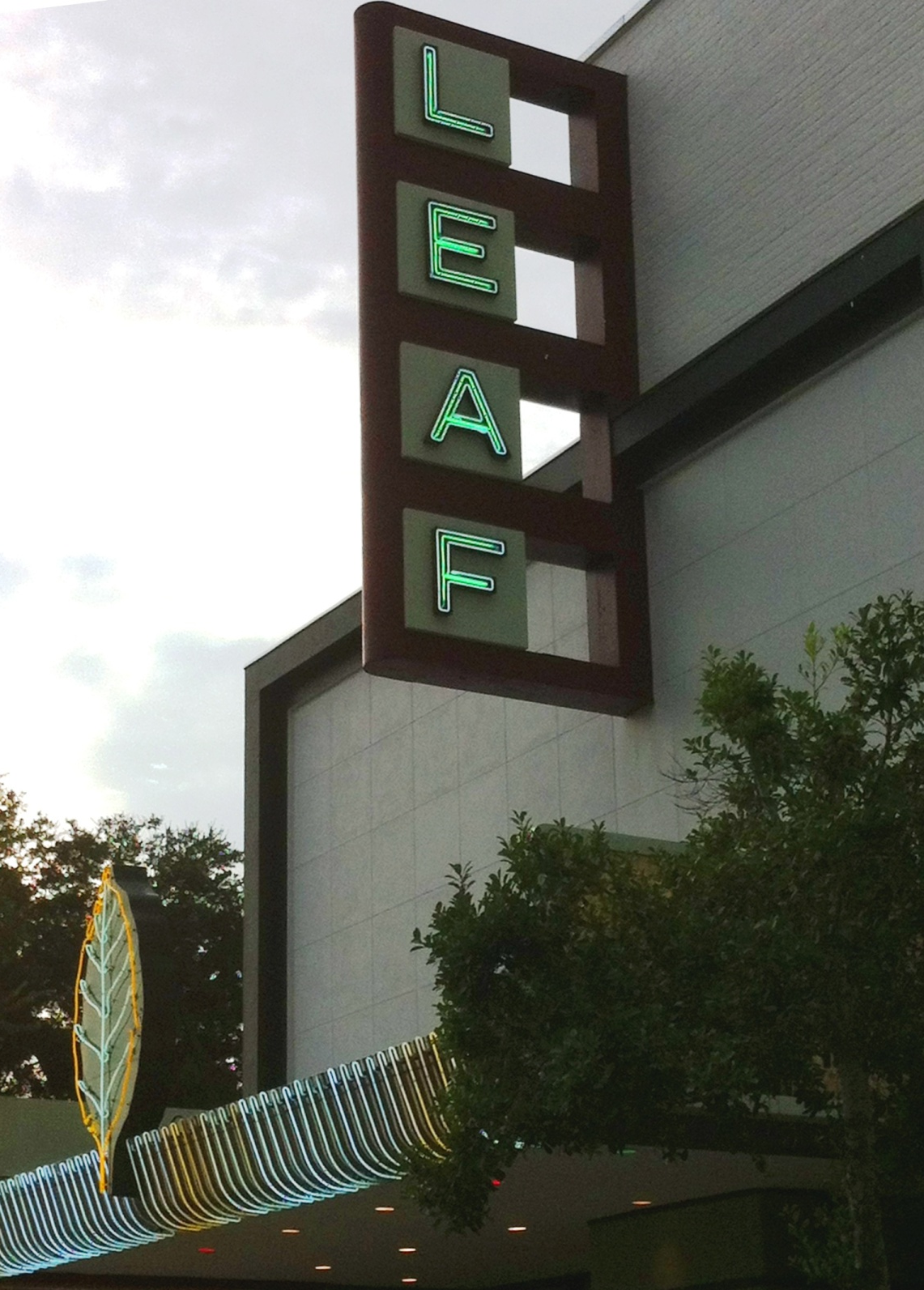
The Leaf Theater

The Leaf Theater is a historical theater in Quincy, Florida, run by the non-profit group Quincy Music Theater.

The Leaf Theater was built in 1949 and named for the economic impact of shade tobacco on the community. Originally a movie theater, the grand opening was hosted by Roy Rogers. The building had air conditioning, a cry room, and a separate entrance for blacks before desegregation took effect. In 1980, the Leaf closed due to competition from multiplexes.

In 1983, the building was purchased and donated to the Quincy Music Theatre group who restored it through a preservation grant, local funds and private gifts from donors who were relations of the Quincy residents who were original purchasers of Coca-Cola stocks. The theater now hosts live musical theatre and educational events throughout the year. In the summer, The Leaf sponsors a Children's Summer Theatre Workshop and film events. Steven L. Taylor periodically conducts master class workshops at The Leaf.

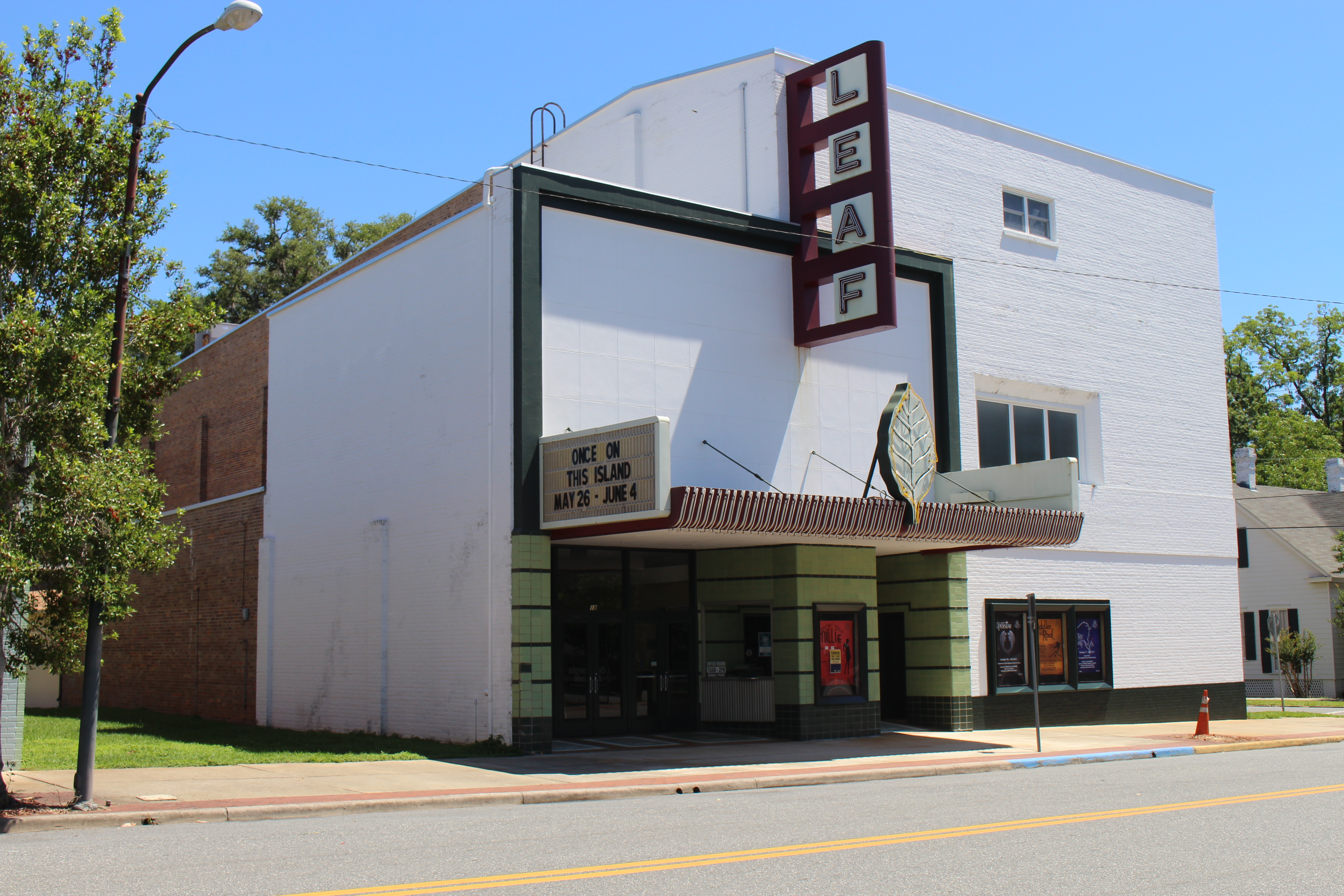
