= Robert F. Munroe Day School =

Location
- 30.6534°N 84.6996°W

Information
- Founded: 1969
- Campus size: 20 acres (8.1 ha)
- Website: www.rfmunroe.org
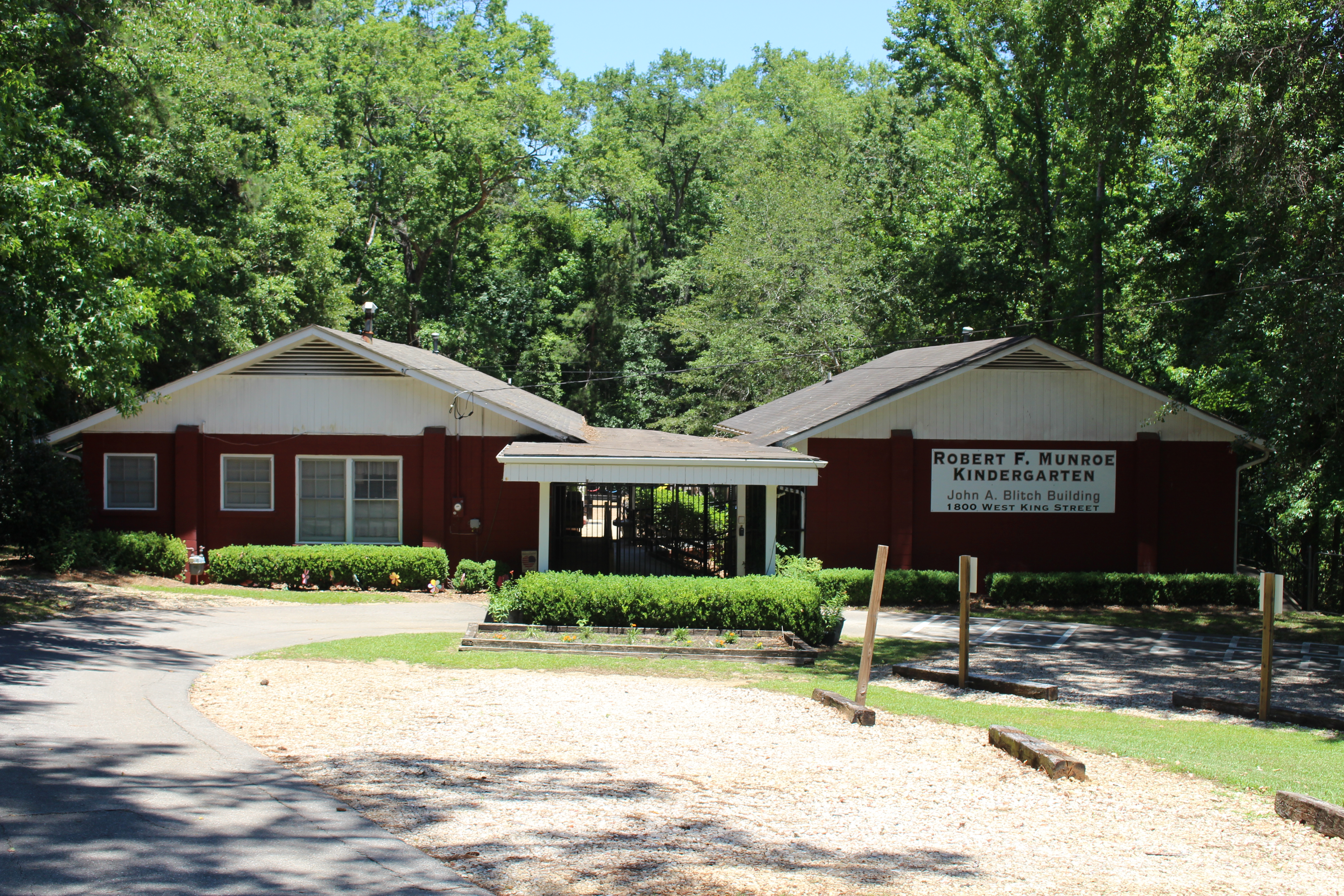
- The Robert F. Munroe Day Kindergarten John A. Blitch Building is within Quincy proper

Robert F. Munroe Day School is a K-12 private school in Gadsden County, Florida, which was opened as a segregation academy in 1970.

== History ==
As in many public school districts in the Southern United States, Gadsden County officials delayed their compliance with the U.S. Supreme Court's 1954 order to end segregation in public schools. In 1965, the first Black students began attending previously all-white schools in county schools. That same year, groups of white parents began organizing private schools, dubbed segregation academies, to keep their children from being educated alongside black students. One such group came together in 1968; the following year, the board incorporated a non-profit organization to launch what was to be called Gadsden Day School. Founding board member Robert Fraser Munroe died before the school opened its doors, and the remaining members renamed their segregation academy to honor his work in creating it.

In 1970, the school began operations with grades 1 through 12 under headmaster S.M. Eubanks. The day kindergarten Quincy campus opened in 1977.

== Campuses ==
The current main campus is in unincorporated Gadsden County, Florida, with a Havana post office address. The kindergarten campus, the Robert F. Munroe Day Kindergarten, is in Quincy proper.

The campus which it previously used for teaching elementary through high school is in Mount Pleasant, an unincorporated area near Quincy, As of 2024 the athletic fields at this campus continue to be in use.

The main campus had 20 acres (8.1 ha) of land. Buildings on the Mount Pleasant campus included:

- Bates Science Building (1981). Named for George Davis Bates Jr. and Mortimer Boulware Bates.
- Billy Don Grant Student Center (1990). Named for a donor.
- Angus T. Hinson Elementary Science Lab & Maker's Space (2019).
- Carolyn Brinson May Auditorium. Remodeled and renamed in 2005.
- Mary Gray Munroe Library (1983). Named for the mother of the school's namesake.
- Byron and Isabel Suber Complex (1971). School gymnasium remodeled and renamed in 1998.
- VanLandingham & Mahaffey Building (1997). Holds classrooms for grades 1 and 2; named for Jimmy Mahaffey and Hall VanLandingham.
- Julia Munroe Woodward Elementary Building (1997). Holds classrooms for grades 3–5

The Quincy kindergarten campus included the John Allen Blitch Child Development Center (1987).

In 2021, the school planned to move its main campus to a new 40-acre (16 ha) site on the eastern edge of Gadsden County, near the boundary with Leon County. It planned to continue operating the Quincy kindergarten. The move would make it easier for high school students to take courses at Tallahassee Community College. After the move, the school continued to use the sports fields in the former Mount Pleasant campus.
