= Elizabeth Croom Bellamy =

American poet and novelist (1837–1900)

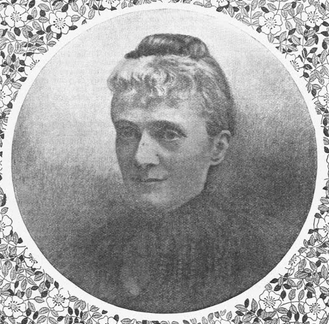
- Kamba Thorpe
- Born: Elizabeth Whitfield Croom; April 17, 1837 Quincy, Florida, U. S.
- Died: April 13, 1900 (aged 62) Mobile, Alabama, U.S.
- Occupation: teacher; author
- Genre: novels; short stories; essays
- Spouse: Charles E. Bellamy (m. 1858; died 1863)
- Children: 2

Elizabeth Whitfield Croom Bellamy (née Croom; pen name, Kamba Thorpe; 1837–1900) was an American author of novels, short stories, and essays. She also taught school for many years. Her first novels were, Four Oaks (1867), and The Little Joanna (1876). Under her own name, she published Old Man Gilbert (1888) and Benny Lancaster (1890). She was a frequent contributor to the Atlantic Monthly, Appleton's Magazine, The Cycle, The Youth's Companion, and many other periodicals.

== Early life and education ==
Elizabeth (Note: Willard & Livermomre (1893) use the given name, "Emily".) Whitfield Croom was born in Quincy, Florida, April 17, 1837. Her parents were William Whitfield and Julia (Stephens) Croom, natives of North Carolina, who removed to Florida prior to the American Civil War. She was a granddaughter of Gen. William and Elizabeth (Whitfield) Croom of Lenoir County, North Carolina, and of Cicero Stephens.

She was educated at Pelham Priory, Philadelphia, and Springer institute, New York City, and was an accomplished musician and linguist.

== Career ==
She taught in a female seminary in Eutaw, Alabama, for several years. Upon the death of her husband and children, she began teaching in Mobile, Alabama, 1863, and continued in that profession until her death.

Bellamy wrote under the pen-name "Kamba Thorpe" (sometimes misspelled, "Kampa Thorpe") Four Oaks (New York, 1867), and Little Joanna (New York, 1876). Additional works included Old Man Gilbert (1888) and The Luck of the Pendennings (1895, Ladies Home Journal). She contributed essays to the Mobile Sunday Times.

== Personal life ==
In 1858, she married Dr. Charles E. Bellamy, her cousin, a native of North Carolina, who had located in Florida. He was a Confederate surgeon, and died in the service in 1863. They had two children: Bryan, who at the age of four, and a daughter who died in infancy.

Elizabeth Croom Bellamy died April 13, 1900, four days before her 63rd birthday, in Mobile, Alabama.

Her biography, Elizabeth Whitfield Croom Bellamy: The Life and Works of a Southern Bell (University of Texas at Austin, 1996) was published by Dorothy McLeod MacInerney.

== Selected works ==
- Four-oaks: A Novel (1867) (text)
- Elizabeth Bellamy's Composition Book (1872)
- The Little Joanna: A Novel (1876) (text)
- Old Man Gilbert (1888)
- Penny Lancaster, Farmer (1889)
- Benny Lancaster (1890)
- Ely's Automatic Housemaid (1899)
