= John Lee McFarlin House =

Historic house in Florida, United States

- U.S. National Register of Historic Places
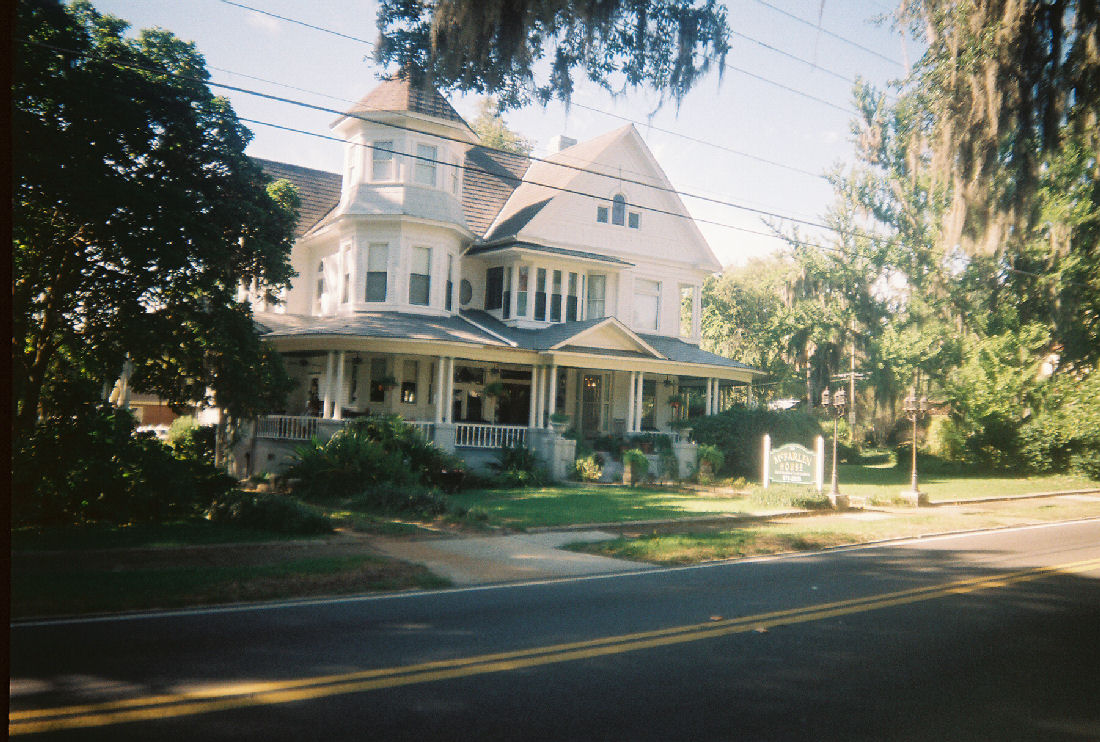

- Location within Florida Location within the United States
- Location: 305 E. King St., Quincy, Florida
- Coordinates: 30°35′26″N 84°34′22″W
- Area: less than one acre
- Built: c.1895
- Architectural style: Queen Anne
- NRHP reference No.: 74000627
- Added to NRHP: December 27, 1974

The John Lee McFarlin House, also known as the A.D. Lester House, is a historic house located at 305 East King Street in Quincy, Florida. It was added to the National Register of Historic Places in 1974.

It is a Queen Anne-style house built for John Lee McFarlin in 1895 or 1896. Its NRHP nomination reports:

Compared to Queen Anne houses in other parts of the country, McFarlin's house may seem restrained, but in Gadsden County it is an extravaganza. It is a testament to a time when the function of a decorative turret was "to show that the owner could afford to build a home with decorative turrets."

== Gallery ==
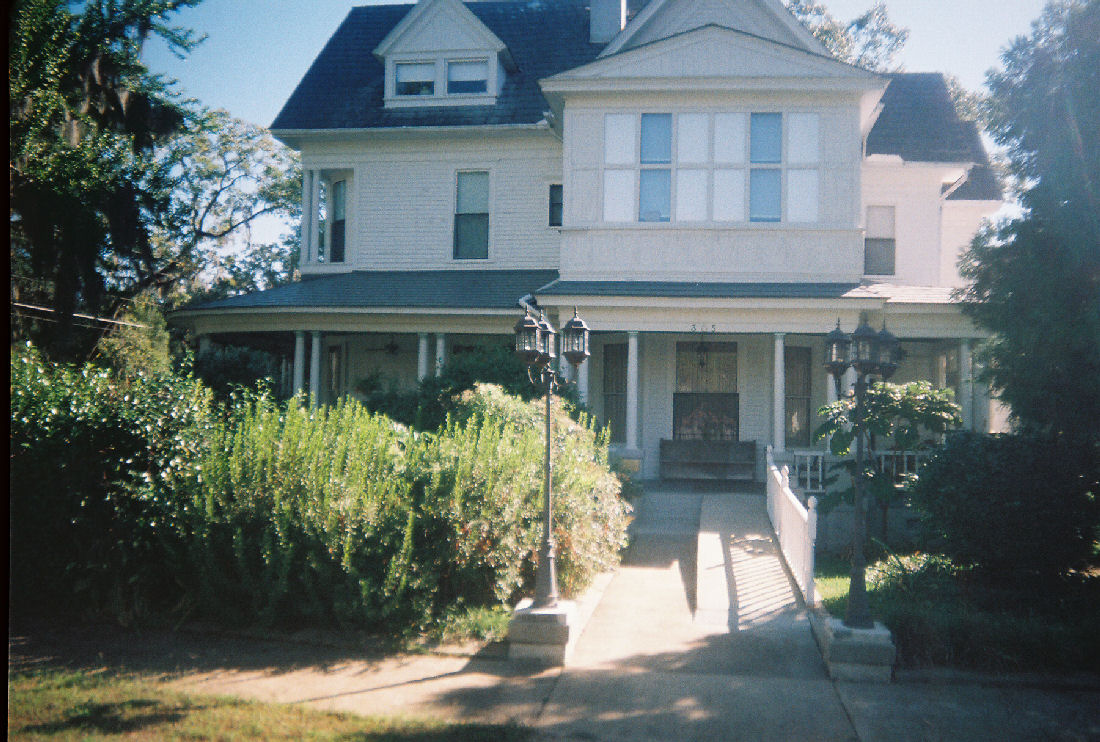
