= Willoughby Gregory House =

Historic house in Florida, United States

- U.S. National Register of Historic Places
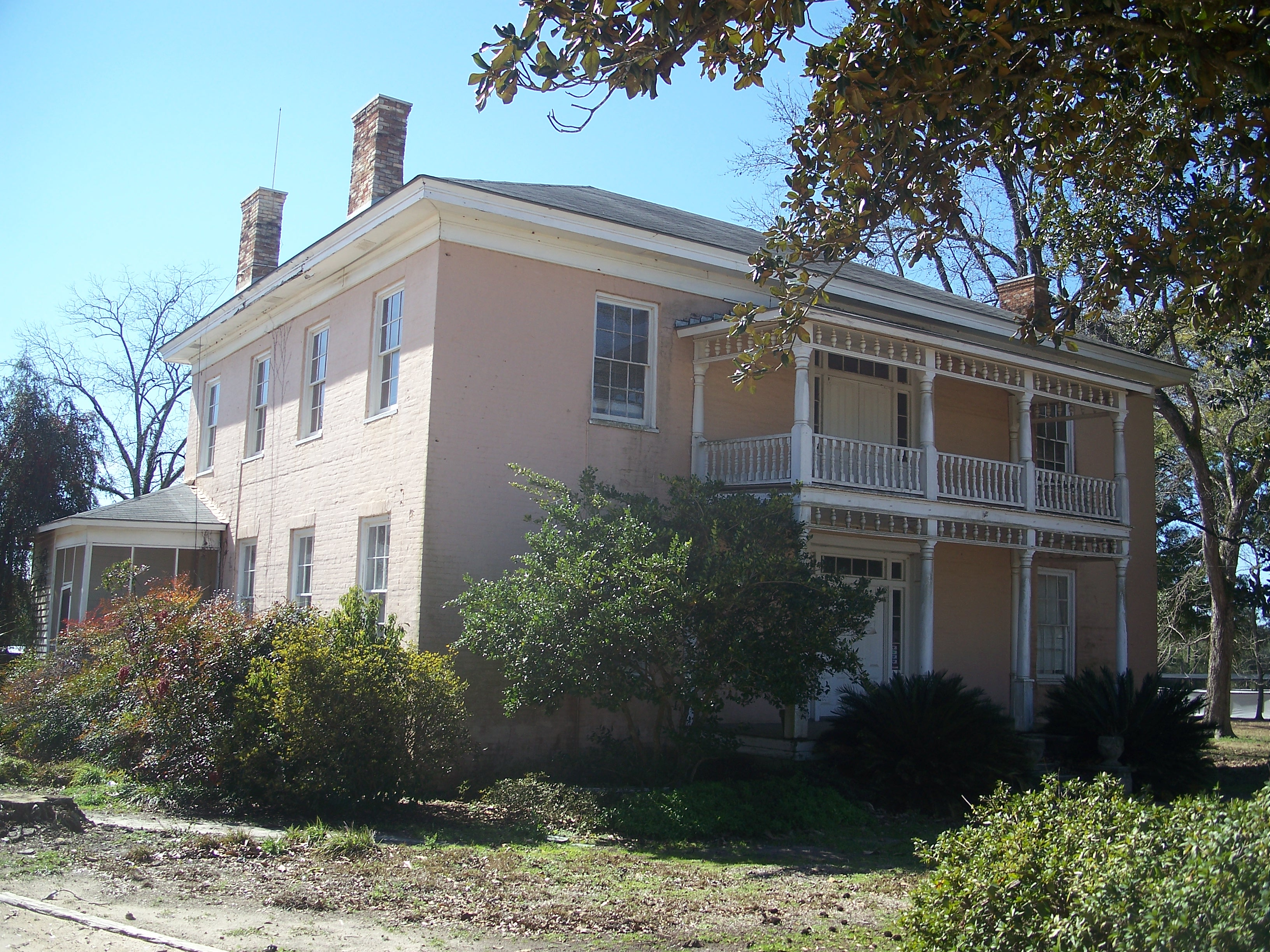

- Location within Florida Location within the United States
- Location: Hwy. 274 and Krausland Rd., Quincy, Florida
- Coordinates: 30°33′29″N 84°36′43″W
- Area: less than one acre
- NRHP reference No.: 83003520
- Added to NRHP: December 16, 1983

The Willoughby Gregory House (also known as Krausland) is a historic home in Quincy, Florida. It is located near the junction of Highway 274 and Krausland Road. On December 16, 1983, it was added to the U.S. National Register of Historic Places.
