= Gretna School =

Historic school in Gretna, Florida

- U.S. National Register of Historic Places
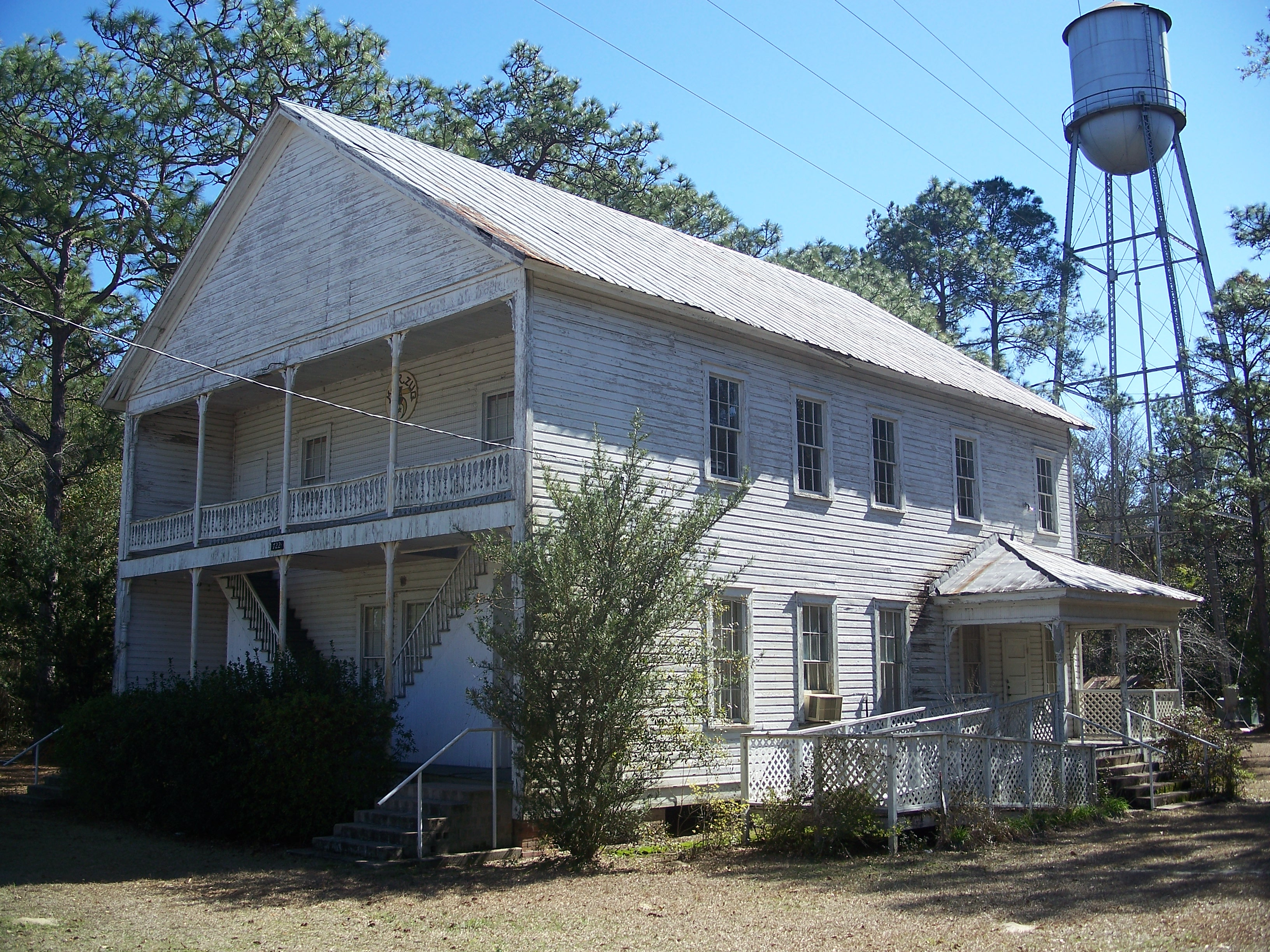

- Location within Florida Location within the United States
- Location: Gretna, Florida, USA
- Coordinates: 30°37′00″N 84°39′29″W
- NRHP reference No.: 08000502
- Added to NRHP: June 10, 2008

Gretna School is a historic school at 722 Church Street in Gretna, Florida, United States. On June 10, 2008, it was added to the U.S. National Register of Historic Places.
