= E. B. Shelfer House =

Historic house in Florida, United States

- U.S. National Register of Historic Places
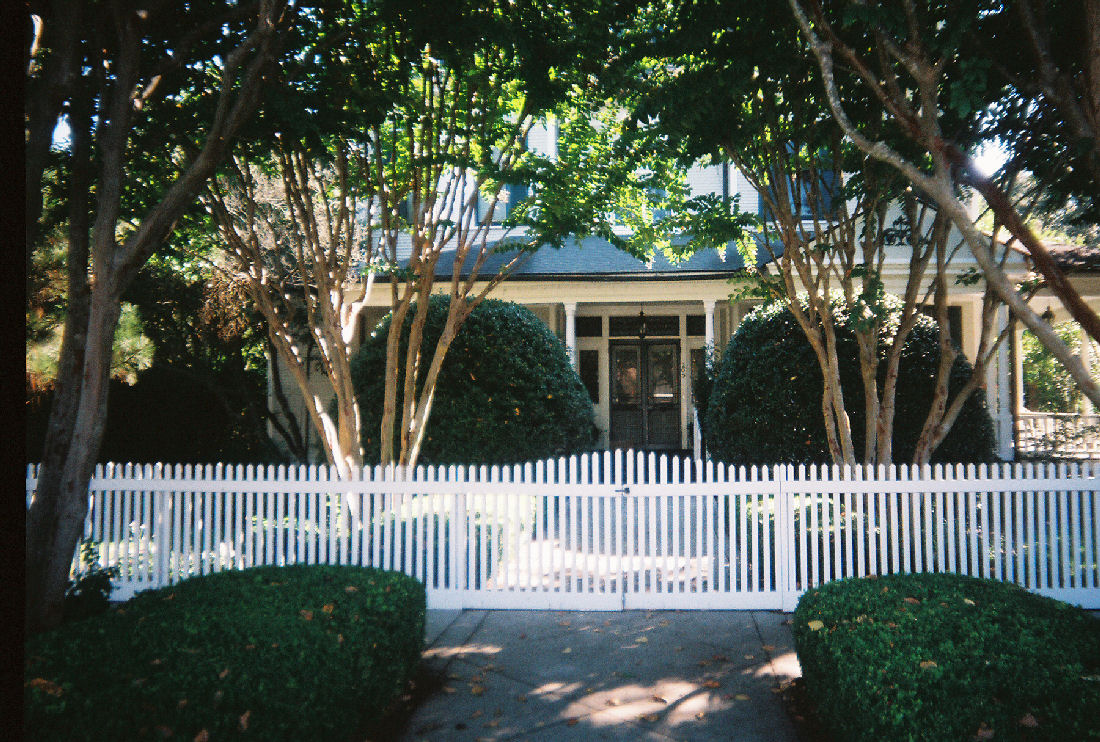

- Location within Florida Location within the United States
- Location: 205 N. Madison St., Quincy, Florida
- Coordinates: 30°35′25″N 84°34′31″W
- Area: less than one acre
- Built: 1903; 123 years ago
- Architectural style: Frame Vernacular with Queen Anne elements
- NRHP reference No.: 75000556
- Added to NRHP: April 4, 1975

The E. B. Shelfer House is a historic home in Quincy, Florida, United States. It is located at 205 North Madison Street. On April 4, 1975, it was added to the U.S. National Register of Historic Places.
