= Quincy Historic District =

Historic district in Florida, United States

- U.S. National Register of Historic Places
- U.S. Historic district
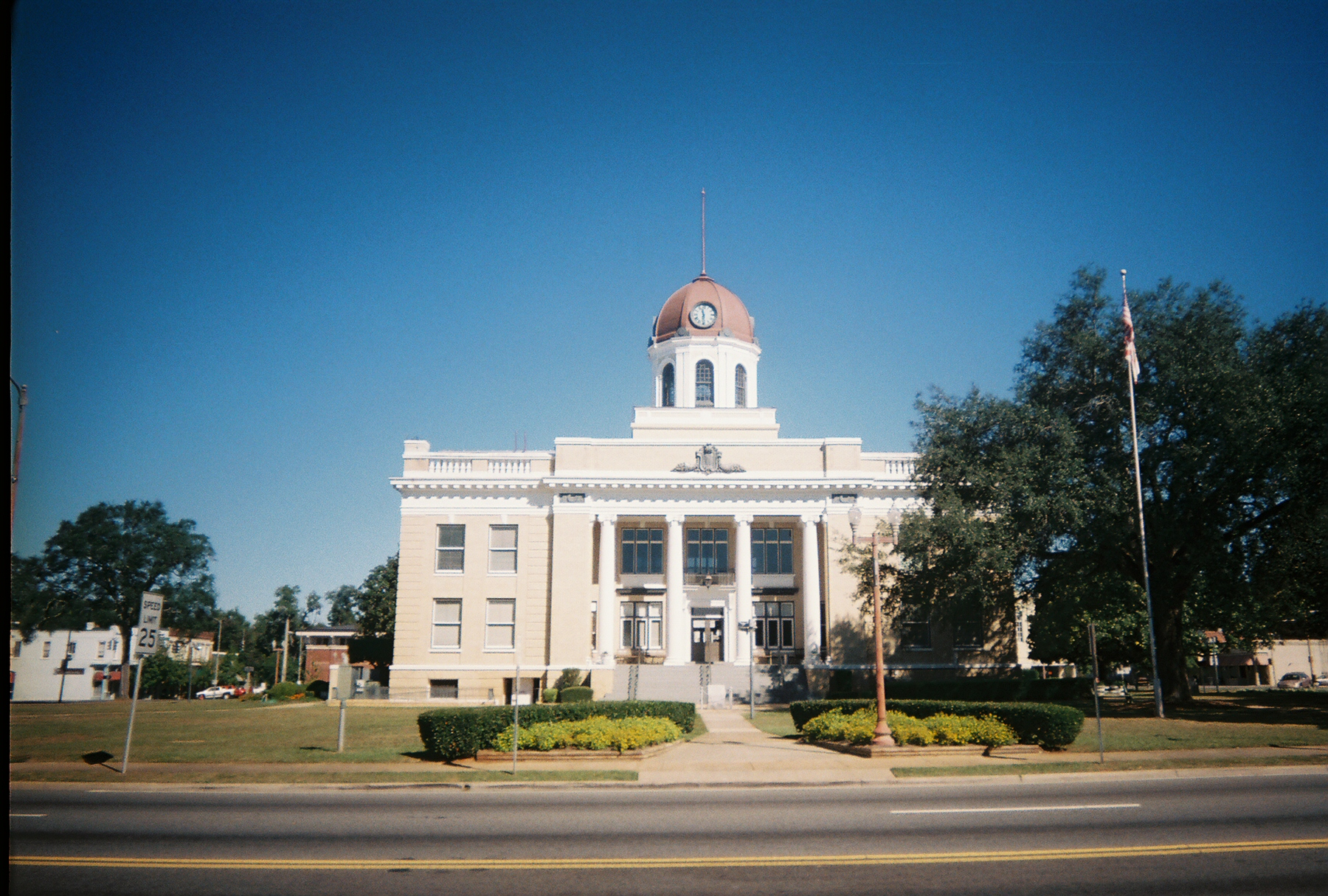
- Gadsden County Courthouse, in the district

- Location within Florida Location within the United States
- Location: Quincy, Florida
- Coordinates: 30°35′28″N 84°34′30″W
- Area: 1,400 acres (5.7 km^{2})
- NRHP reference No.: 78000942
- Added to NRHP: November 9, 1978

The Quincy Historic District is a U.S. Historic District (designated as such on November 9, 1978) located in Quincy, Florida. The district is bounded by Sharon, Clark, Stewart, and Corry Streets. It contains 145 historic buildings.
