= Dezell House =

Historic house in Florida, United States

- U.S. National Register of Historic Places
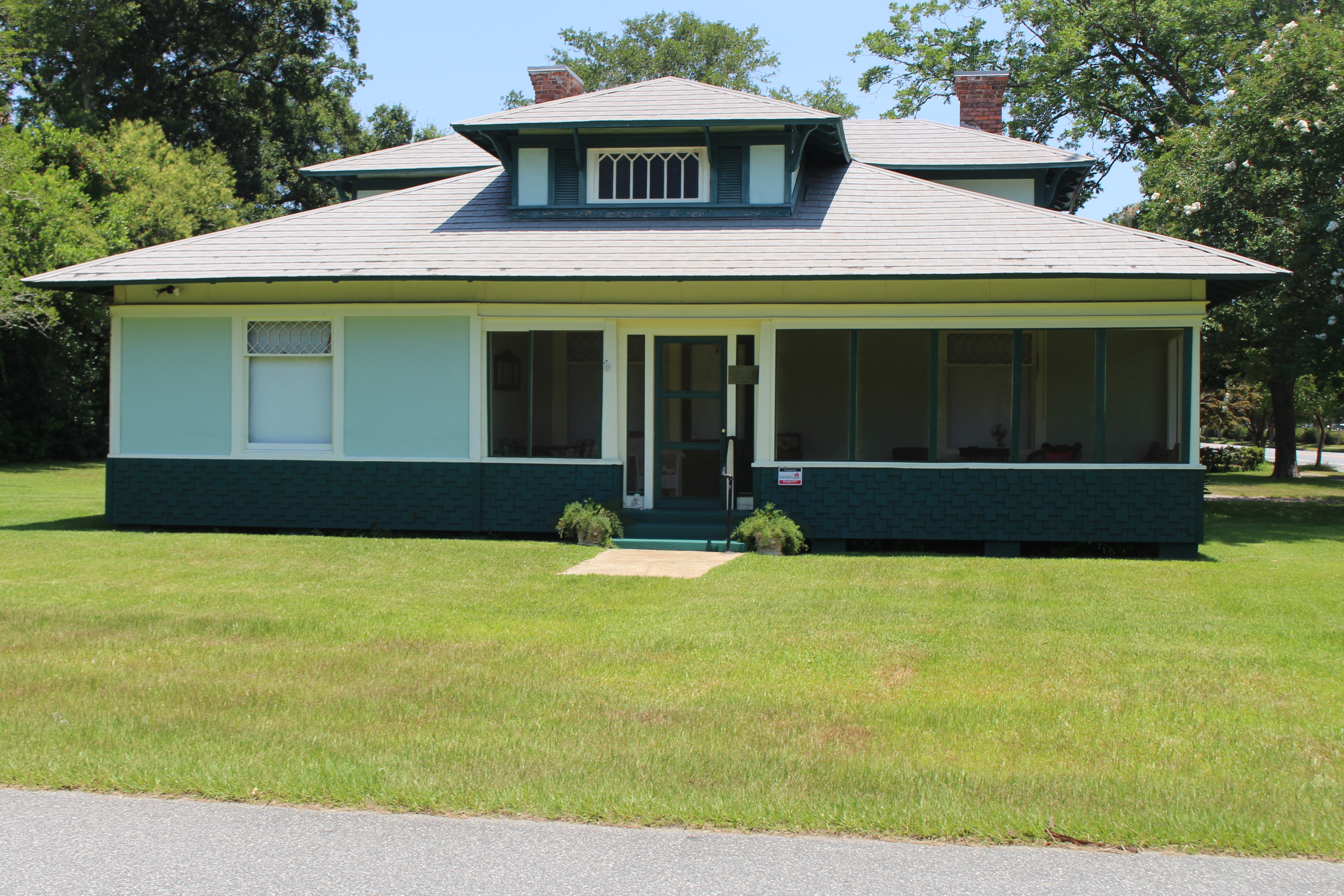

- Location within Florida Location within the United States
- Location: 328 E. 8th St., Greensboro, Florida
- Coordinates: 30°34′0″N 84°44′38″W
- Area: less than one acre
- Built: 1912
- Architect: Dezell, James
- Architectural style: Prairie School
- NRHP reference No.: 06000358
- Added to NRHP: May 10, 2006

The Dezell House is a historic house located at 328 East 8th Street in Greensboro, Florida. The house retains a high degree of its historic integrity.

== Description and history ==
The Prairie Style house was completed in 1919, and is distinguished by its prominent horizontal lines, broad eaves on a complex hip roof with dormers on each of the four elevations radiating from the roof peak. On May 10, 2006, it was added to the National Register of Historic Places.
