= Elizabeth Bellamy (missionary) =

English Anglican missionary and teacher who served in Beirut

Elizabeth Bellamy (19 March 1845 – 18 August 1940) was an English Anglican missionary and teacher who served in Beirut. She was born in Birmingham, Birmingham, England on 19 March 1845. After her missionary labours, she moved to Dunedin, New Zealand.
