= Judge P. W. White House =

Historic house in Florida, United States

- U.S. National Register of Historic Places
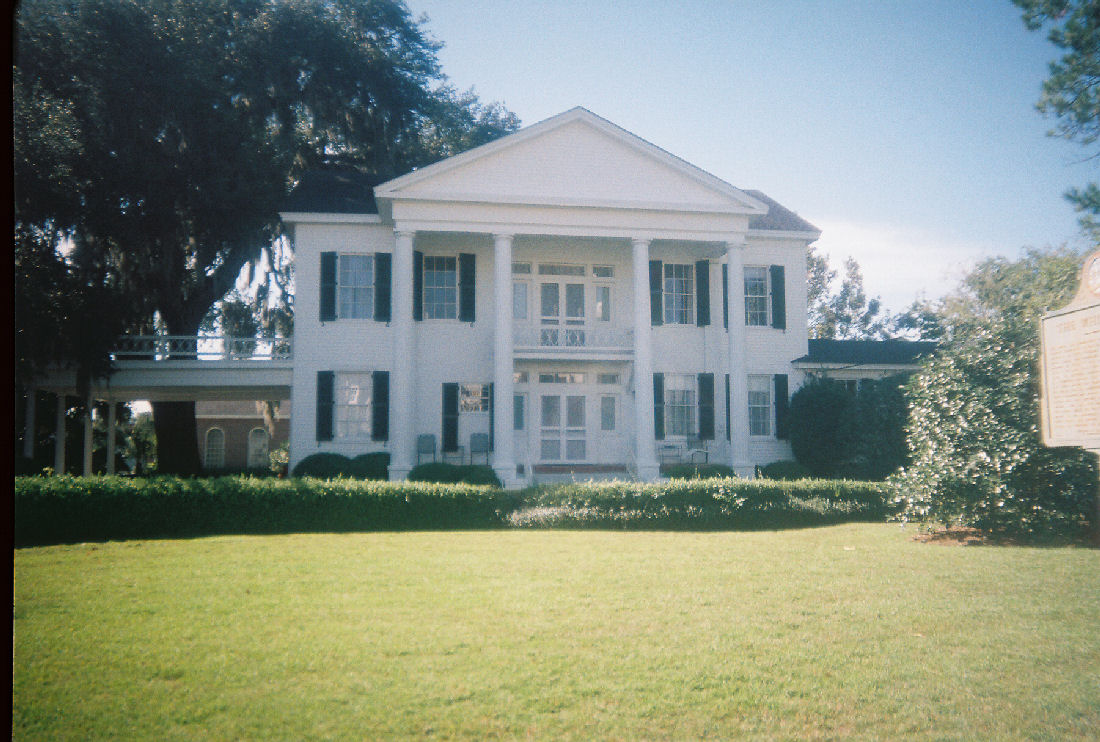

- Location within Florida Location within the United States
- Location: Quincy, Florida
- Coordinates: 30°35′27″N 84°34′34″W
- Built: 1843
- Architectural style: Greek Revival, Classical Revival
- NRHP reference No.: 72000319
- Added to NRHP: December 5, 1972

The Judge P. W. White House (also known as the Methodist Parsonage) is a historic home in Quincy, Florida, United States. It is located at 212 North Madison Street. On December 5, 1972, it was added to the U.S. National Register of Historic Places.
