= E. C. Love House =

Historic house in Florida, United States

- U.S. National Register of Historic Places
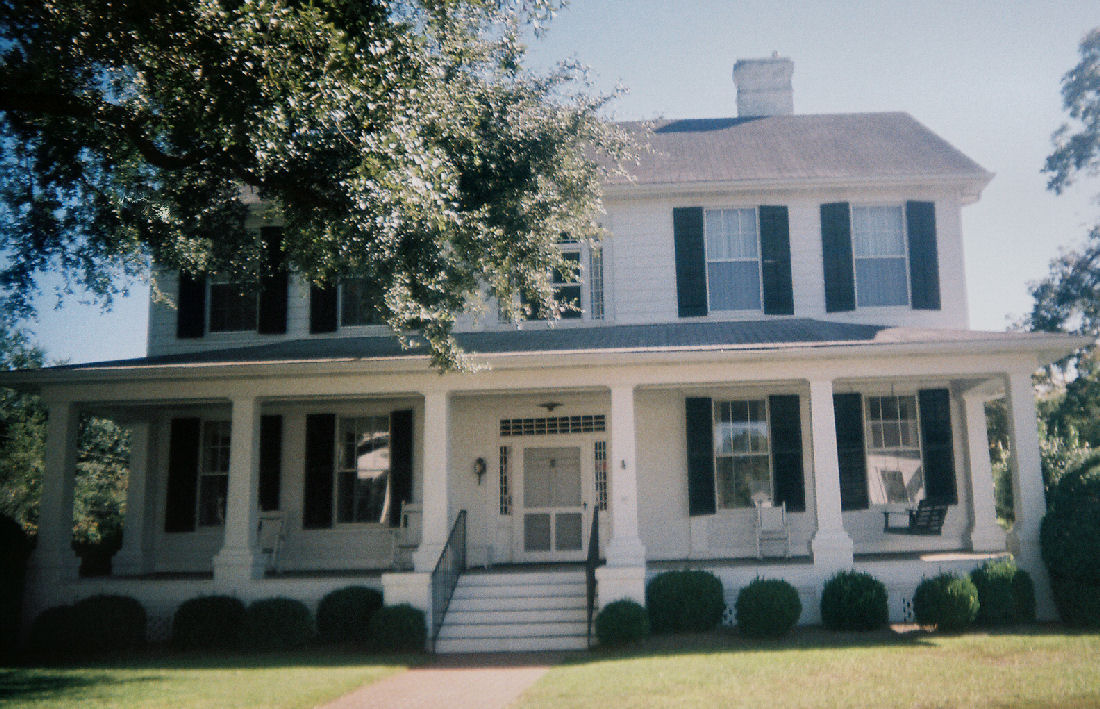

- Location within Florida Location within the United States
- Location: 219 N. Jackson St., Quincy, Florida
- Coordinates: 30°35′26″N 84°34′45″W
- Area: less than one acre
- Built: 1850
- NRHP reference No.: 74000626
- Added to NRHP: December 30, 1974

The E. C. Love House is a historic home in Quincy, Florida, United States. It is located at 219 North Jackson Street. On December 30, 1974, it was added to the U.S. National Register of Historic Places.
