= Stockton-Curry House =

Historic house in Florida, United States

- U.S. National Register of Historic Places
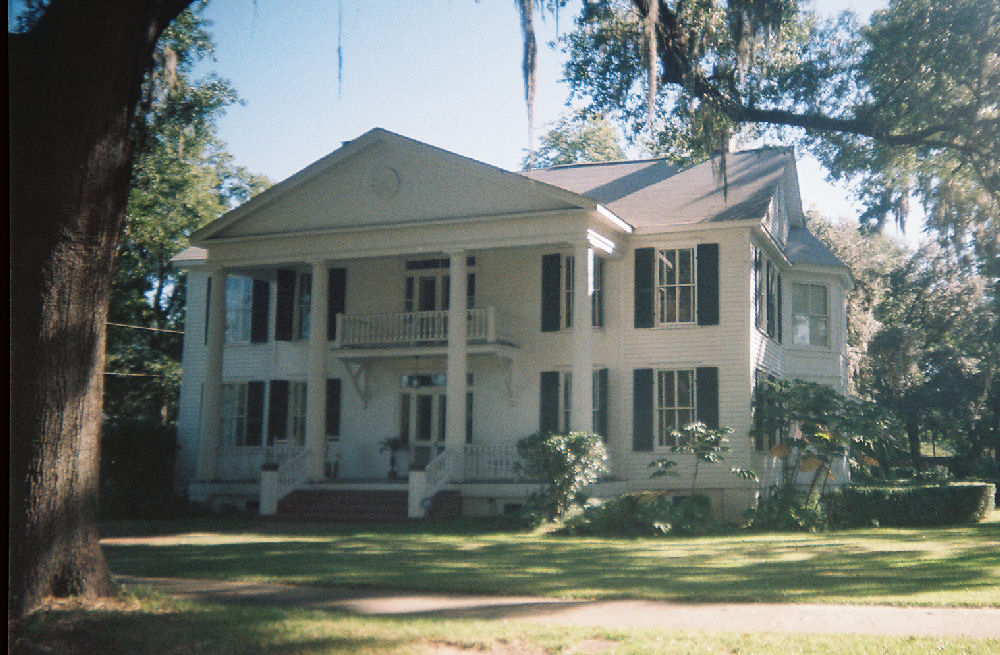

- Location within Florida Location within the United States
- Location: 121 N. Duval St., Quincy, Florida
- Coordinates: 30°35′23″N 84°34′28″W
- Area: less than one acre
- Built: c. 1842
- Architect: Isaac R. Harris
- Architectural style: Classical Revival
- NRHP reference No.: 74000629
- Added to NRHP: December 31, 1974

The Stockton-Curry House (also known as the Philip A. Stockton House or C.H. Curry House) is a historic house located in Quincy, Florida. It is locally significant as a surviving example of antebellum-era Classic Revival architecture.

== Description and history ==
It was originally of clap-boarded frame construction, two-and-a-half stories in height, and covered by a moderately pitched roof. It had a rectangular plan with a broad central hall, two rooms deep, and the stairs were partitioned within one of the rear bedrooms. It was added to the National Register of Historic Places on December 31, 1974.
