= Old Philadelphia Presbyterian Church =

Historic church in Florida, United States

- U.S. National Register of Historic Places
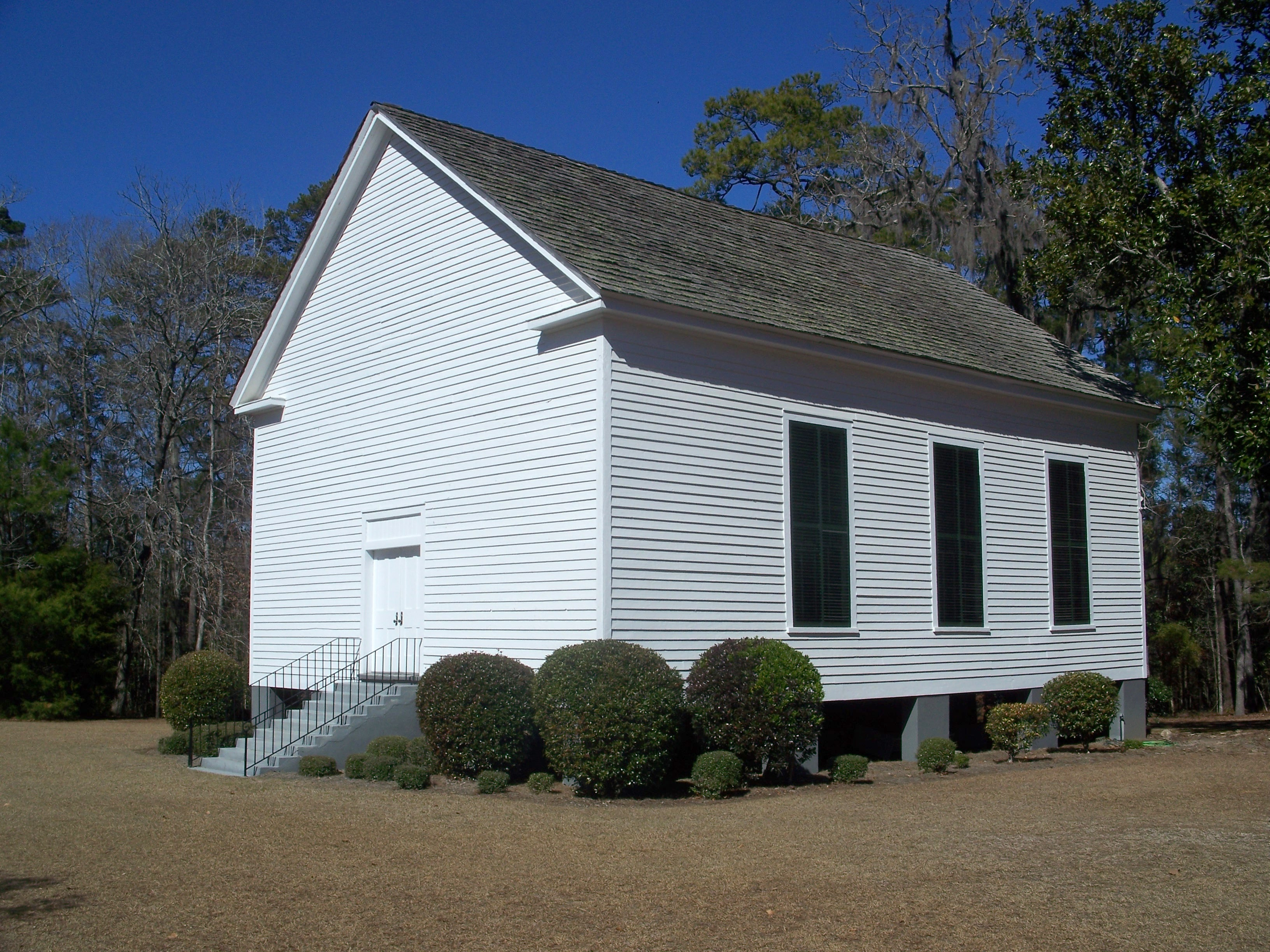

- Location within Florida Location within the United States
- Location: Gadsden County, Florida
- Nearest city: Quincy
- Coordinates: 30°38′37″N 84°34′38″W
- NRHP reference No.: 75000557
- Added to NRHP: February 24, 1975

The Old Philadelphia Presbyterian Church is a historic church in Quincy, Florida. It is located five miles north of Quincy, off SR 65 on County Road 272. On February 24, 1975, it was added to the U.S. National Register of Historic Places.
