= Quincy Library =

- U.S. National Register of Historic Places
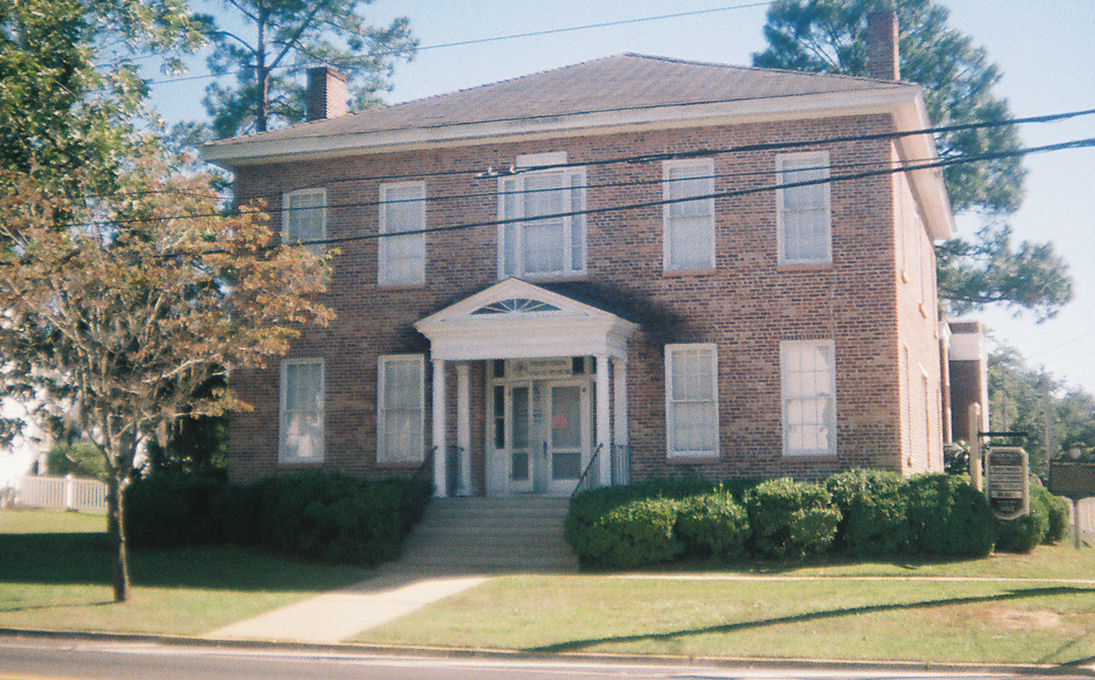

- Location within Florida Location within the United States
- Location: Quincy, Florida
- Coordinates: 30°35′28″N 84°34′37″W
- Built: 1850
- Architectural style: Georgian, Federal
- NRHP reference No.: 74000628
- Added to NRHP: September 9, 1974

The Quincy Library (also known as the Quincy Academy) is a historic library in Quincy, Florida, United States. It is located at 303 North Adams Street. On September 9, 1974, it was added to the U.S. National Register of Historic Places.

The building was built in 1850-1851 for the Quincy Academy. It has had numerous uses through Quincy's history.

The Quincy Women's Library Club opened its library in the building in 1931 and the library was still operating in 1973.

== History ==
The Quincy Academy likely began during the 1820s in Quincy, Florida, during a time of increasing establishment of private education institutions in Florida. In 1834, a physical plant was provided for the academy, but an 1849 fire destroyed the building. It is supposed that the designer of the still-standing 1850 building was local builder Charles Waller. Resident testimony claims that the Quincy Academy ceased operations in 1863 due to the Civil War and was utilized as a hospital until 1865, although there is little documentary evidence supporting this claim. The Quincy Academy ceased operations in 1912, and the building was utilized as a temporary county courthouse until 1914. It was then used as a public school until 1920. During the 1920s, it was utilized as a private lending library, a meeting place for local churches, a county vocational school, and a W.P.A.-sponsored childcare center. In 1931, the Quincy Woman’s Club Library began operating in the building. In the 1950s, the building was renovated to make it more useable as a library. The library was still in use in 1974.

== Gallery ==
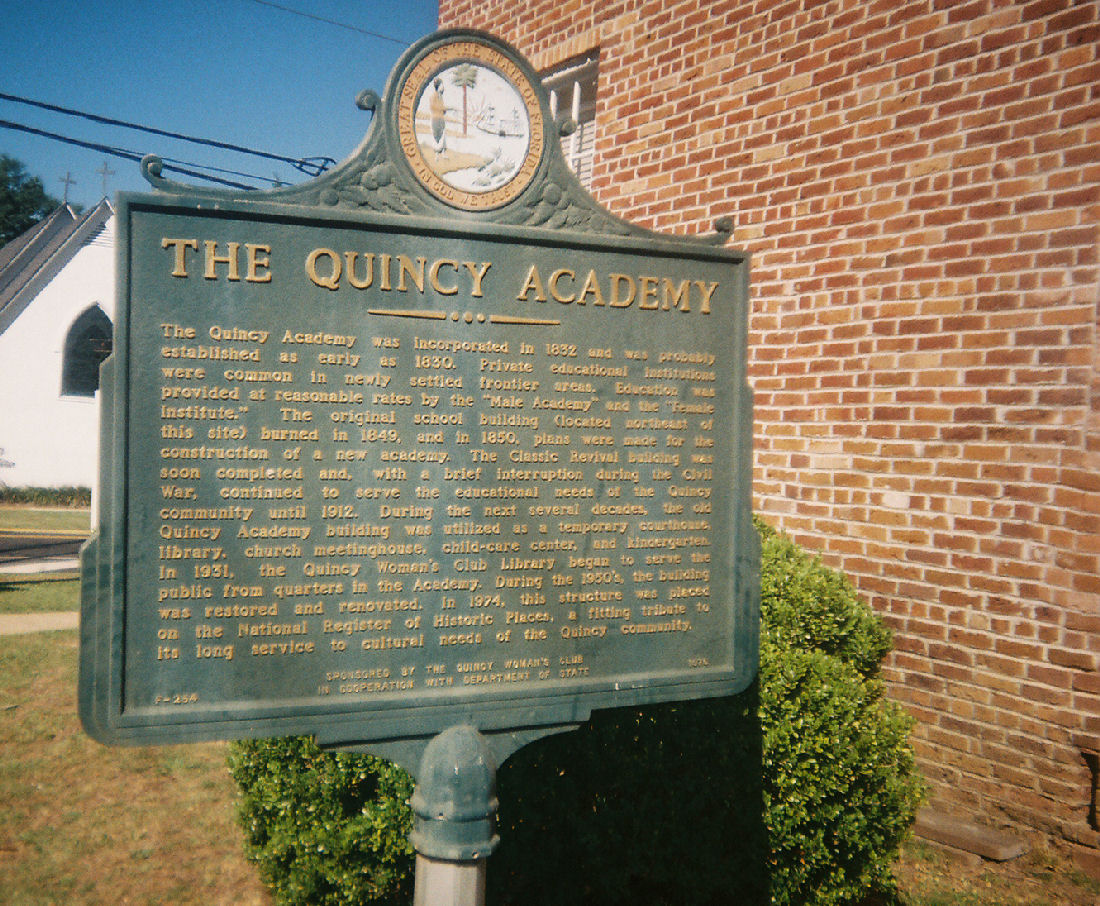
