= Quincy, Florida =

- City
- City of Quincy
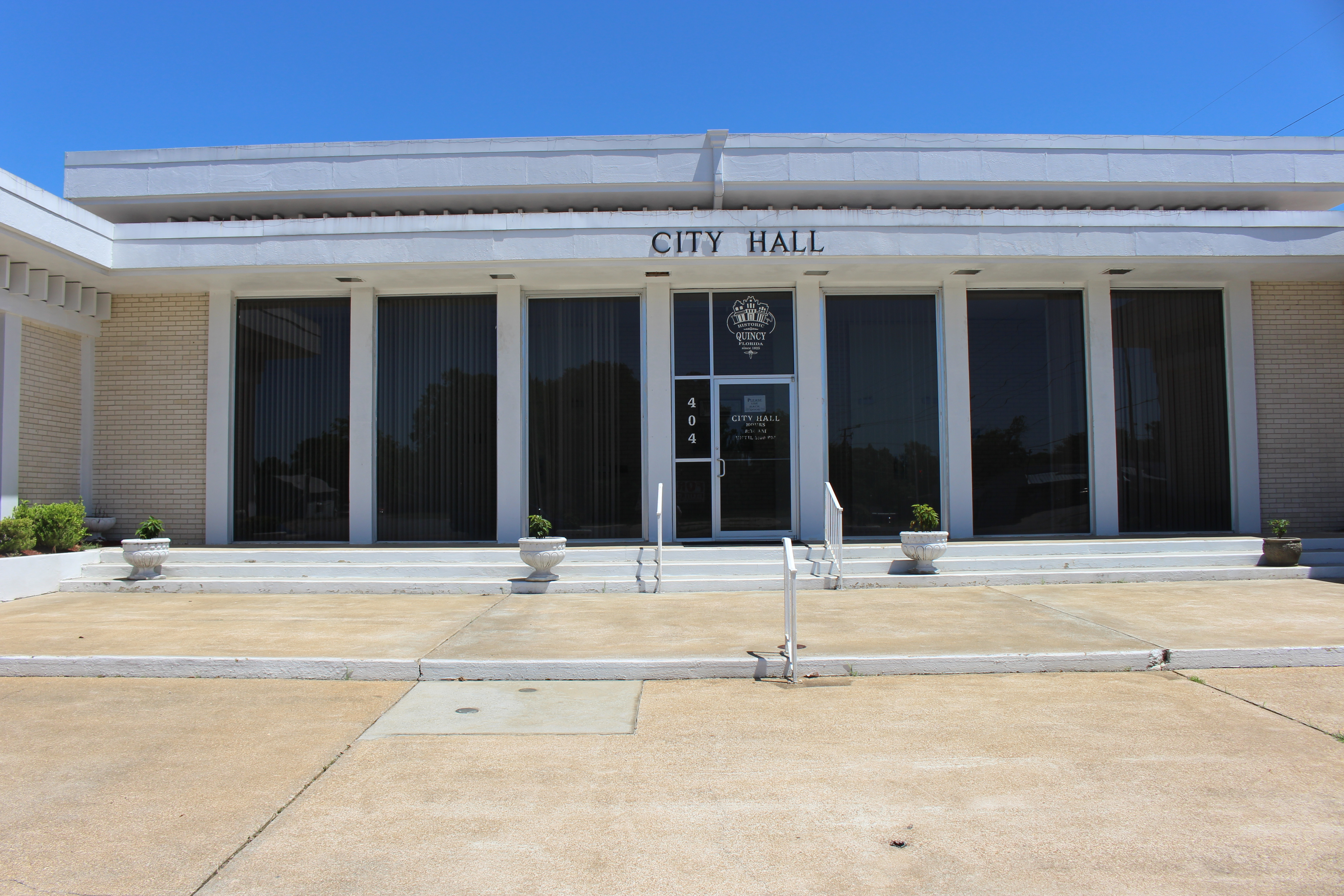
- Quincy City Hall

- Logo
- Motto: "...In the heart of Florida's future"
- Location in Gadsden County and the state of Florida
- Coordinates: 30°33′58″N 84°35′09″W
- Country: United States
- State: Florida
- County: Gadsden
- Incorporated: 1828

Government
  - Type: Commission-Manager

Area
  - City: 11.65 sq mi (30.17 km^{2})
  - Land: 11.65 sq mi (30.17 km^{2})
  - Water: 0 sq mi (0.00 km^{2})
  - Urban: 6.15 sq mi (15.93 km^{2})
- Elevation: 233 ft (71 m)

Population (2020)
  - City: 7,970
  - Density: 684.2/sq mi (264.16/km^{2})
  - Urban: 8,541
  - Urban density: 1,388.6/sq mi (536.16/km^{2})
- Time zone: UTC-5 (Eastern (EST))
  - Summer (DST): UTC-4 (EDT)
- ZIP codes: 32351-32353
- Area code: 850
- FIPS code: 12-59325
- GNIS feature ID: 2404581
- Website: www.myquincy.net

Quincy is a city in and the county seat of Gadsden County, Florida, United States. Quincy is part of the Tallahassee, Florida Metropolitan Statistical Area. The population was 7,970 as of the 2020 census, almost even from 7,972 at the 2010 census.

== History ==
=== Early Florida Statehood and Antebellum Years ===
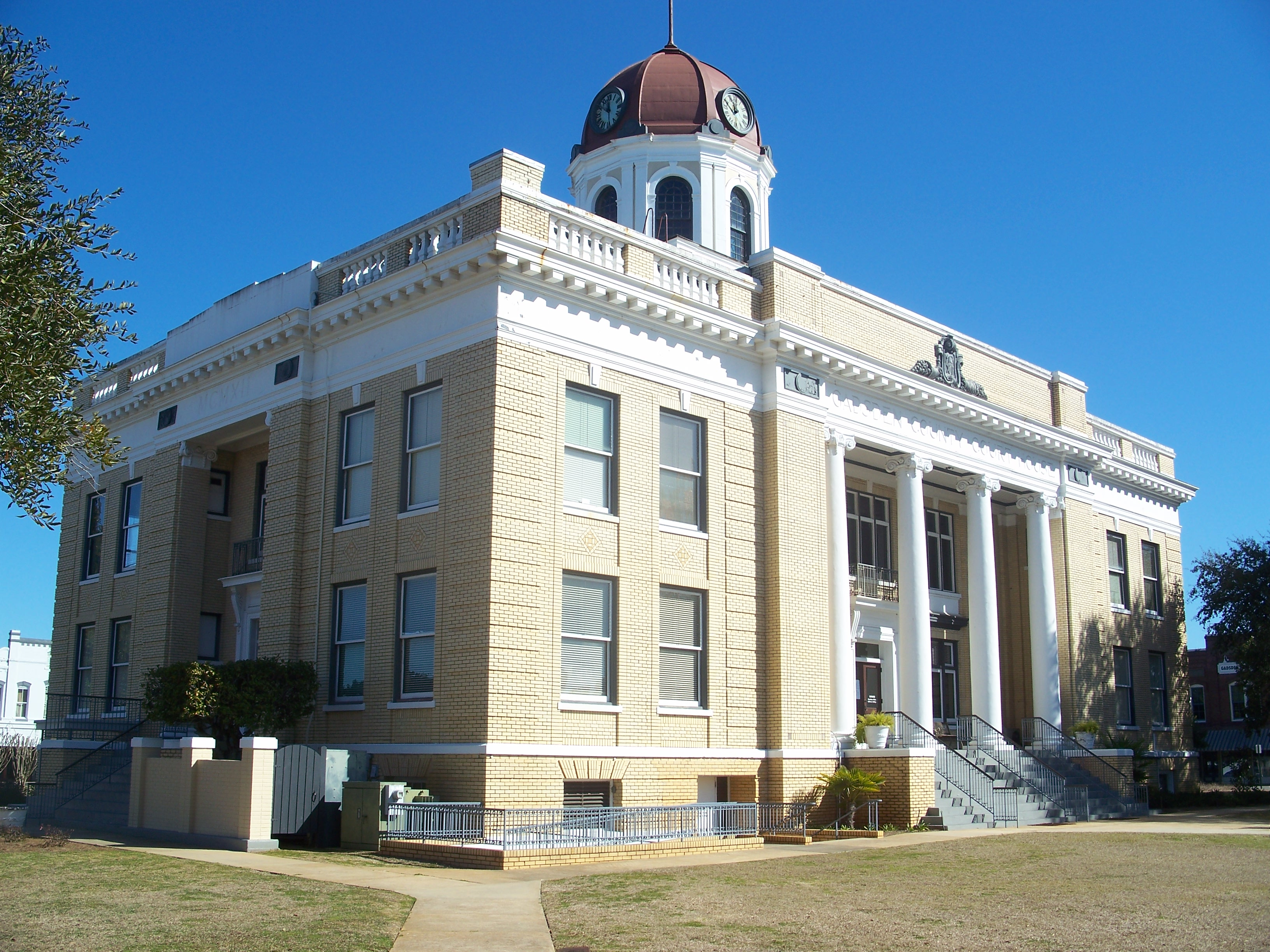
Gadsden County Courthouse in Quincy

Established in 1828, Quincy is the county seat of Gadsden County, and was named for John Quincy Adams. It is located 25 miles (40 km) northwest of Tallahassee, the state capital. Quincy's economy was based on agriculture, including farming tomatoes, tobacco, mushrooms, soybeans and other crops.

According to The Floridian newspaper, in 1840 there were two schools in Quincy, the Quincy Male Academy and the Quincy Female Academy. Joshua Knowles published the Quincy Sentinel in Quincy from November 1839 until it relocated to Tallahassee and became the Florida Sentinel in 1841. The paper began publishing in Tallahassee in February or March 1841 as a successor to Quincy Sentinel.

=== American Civil War ===
One of the most important anti-secession organizations in Florida leading up to the Civil War was the Constitutional Union Party. The party, while acknowledging the "wrongs" inflicted upon the south by the north, advocated for "pacific, rational, and judicial methods for righting these wrongs." The party held its state convention in Quincy on June 27, 1860.

William Tennent Stockton, once mayor of Quincy, raised a cavalry company following secession called the Gadsden Dragoons. He was subsequently appointed as captain of the 1st Florida Cavalry Regiment.

Florida was a major contributor of beef, salt, and other supplies to the Confederacy. To facilitate the supply chain, the state was divided into five commissary districts under the overall command of Major Pleasant W. White of Quincy.

=== Tobacco ===
In 1828, Governor William P. Duval introduced Cuban tobacco to the territory of Florida. As a result, the culture of shade-grown cigar wrapper tobacco was a dominant factor in the social and economic development of Gadsden County. Tobacco is a native plant of the western hemisphere. Early European explorers discovered Native Americans growing the plant when they arrived.

In 1829, John Smith migrated to Gadsden County in covered wagons with his family and four related families. Since there was already a resident named John Smith in the community, he became known as John "Virginia" Smith. When Smith ventured southward he brought with him a type of tobacco seed which was used for chewing and pipe smoking. He planted that seed and found that the plants grew vigorously. Because there was no market for tobacco in small quantities, it was twisted together, cured and shared with his friends. He purchased some Cuban tobacco seed and planted them with his Virginia tobacco. Several years passed and the two tobaccos blended.

When the Virginia tobacco was grown in Florida soil, it was much thinner and lighter in color. Smith began saving the seed from the hybridized stalks. From these seeds, a new plant known as "Florida Wrapper" was developed. So began a tobacco industry at a time when the South was suffering from the low price of cotton.

Growing tobacco continued to be profitable until the beginning of the Civil War in 1861, even when the European markets were no longer available. Of course, during the war and the Reconstruction Era, very little tobacco was grown except for personal use. Those days were tremendously difficult, and recovery was a slow process. The post-war search for a money crop led to the resurgence of the tobacco culture. Through these experiments it was discovered that tobacco which was light in color and silky in texture demanded the highest prices. With more experimentation, shading the plants began. At first, wood slats were used, but these proved too heavy. Then they tried slats draped with cheesecloth to keep the plants from the light. Next came ribbed cheesecloth. Ultimately in 1950, the white cheesecloth was replaced with a treated, longer lasting, yellow cloth that provided perfect shade.

Colonel Henry DuVal, president of the Florida Central and Peninsular Railroad, shipped samples of Gadsden County tobacco to New York for leaf dealers and cigar manufacturers to inspect. Soon representatives of several companies came down from New York to purchase land for growing tobacco. There was such an influx of land purchases that a number of packing houses arose. This continued until 1970 when tobacco companies came under fire and demand diminished. Around 1970, growing tobacco declined substantially in Gadsden. The development of a homogenized cigar wrapper, the ever-increasing cost of production, the subsidizing of the tobacco culture in Central America by the U.S. government, and the increasing, negative legal climate against the tobacco industry have added to the demise of Gadsden's future in tobacco. The last crop of shade-grown cigar wrapper tobacco was grown in 1977.

Quincy then turned to its other crops, tomato, mushroom and egg farms. This continued until the close of Quincy's mushroom factory and massive layoff of workers at Quincy's tomato farm in 2008. Quincy now turns to its businesses and is attempting to build itself into a business-based district.

=== Race relations ===
Quincy was home to Dunbar High School. It also had a Knights of Pythias of North America, South America, Europe, Asia, Africa and Australia Lodge that was attacked, burned, and members murdered by the Ku Klux Klan reportedly because members were required to pay poll taxes and register to vote.

==== Lynchings ====
In 1929, Will Larkins was accused of an attack on a white 13 year old Quincy school girl, for which he was quickly indicted. As Larkins was being transferred he was taken by a mob of 40 masked men from Sheriff Gregory of Gadsden county, near Madison and Live Oak. When he was kidnapped by the mob he was being taken to the Duval county jail in a series of moves that newspapers claimed were for his safe keeping. After his capture by the mob Larkins was carried back to Quincy, near the railroad grade crossing, shot to death and hanged with wire, his body was then dragged through the street tied to an automobile and burned at the area where the mob thought the accused committed his crime. Though Governor Carlton promised an inquiry and investigators were put on the case in late 1929, no mention of Will Larkins, except for the NAACP lynching lists of 1929, is made again in newspapers of the time. Larkins was the third man lynched in Florida that year.

In 1941, A. C. Williams was accused of robbery and the attempted rape of a 12-year-old white girl. The account of the details makes the accusation very improbable, but Williams did not live long enough to be tried for the crime. He was kidnapped from jail by a group of white men, and although they both shot him and hanged him, Williams survived. After learning he was alive, the sheriff formed a search party. His family was aware the sheriff had been involved in the lynching, and hid him. Williams needed medical attention and since the hospitals in the Quincy area would not treat a black person, he needed to be transported to Florida A&M University in Tallahassee. The following day a group of masked men kidnapped him from the ambulance and killed him. His body was dumped on his mother's porch.

==== Resistance to Jim Crow ====
In the 1920s, blacks in Quincy including A. I. Dixie repeatedly tried to form political organizations and vote, and protest brutal labor conditions, but were suppressed by violence from whites. Dixie was flogged repeatedly for his efforts. Later, in 1964, Dixie hosted Congress of Racial Equality student activists, while his daughter Linda organized a sit-in, and Jewell Dixie became the first African American to run for Gadsden County Sheriff.

=== All American City ===
In 1996, Quincy was recognized as an All American City.

== Geography ==
Quincy is located in central Gadsden County in the rolling hills of North Florida.

According to the United States Census Bureau, the city has a total area of 7.9 square miles (20.5 km^{2}), of which 0.02 square miles (0.04 km^{2}), or 0.18%, is water.

=== Climate ===
Quincy has a humid subtropical climate (Köppen: Cfa) with long, hot summers and short, mild winters.

Climate data for Quincy, Florida, 1991–2020 normals, extremes 1896–present
Month	Jan	Feb	Mar	Apr	May	Jun	Jul	Aug	Sep	Oct	Nov	Dec	Year
Record high °F (°C)	85 (29)	86 (30)	91 (33)	95 (35)	102 (39)	108 (42)	104 (40)	102 (39)	105 (41)	96 (36)	89 (32)	86 (30)	108 (42)
Mean maximum °F (°C)	77.4 (25.2)	79.4 (26.3)	83.8 (28.8)	87.5 (30.8)	92.9 (33.8)	95.9 (35.5)	96.4 (35.8)	95.6 (35.3)	93.6 (34.2)	89.0 (31.7)	83.9 (28.8)	79.2 (26.2)	97.6 (36.4)
Mean daily maximum °F (°C)	63.9 (17.7)	66.8 (19.3)	72.6 (22.6)	78.9 (26.1)	86.2 (30.1)	89.9 (32.2)	91.3 (32.9)	90.8 (32.7)	87.9 (31.1)	81.1 (27.3)	73.0 (22.8)	66.5 (19.2)	79.1 (26.2)
Daily mean °F (°C)	51.9 (11.1)	54.0 (12.2)	59.5 (15.3)	66.1 (18.9)	74.2 (23.4)	79.4 (26.3)	81.5 (27.5)	81.2 (27.3)	77.7 (25.4)	69.4 (20.8)	60.0 (15.6)	54.0 (12.2)	67.4 (19.7)
Mean daily minimum °F (°C)	39.8 (4.3)	41.1 (5.1)	46.4 (8.0)	53.2 (11.8)	62.2 (16.8)	68.9 (20.5)	71.6 (22.0)	71.5 (21.9)	67.4 (19.7)	57.7 (14.3)	46.9 (8.3)	41.5 (5.3)	55.7 (13.2)
Mean minimum °F (°C)	22.9 (−5.1)	26.4 (−3.1)	30.3 (−0.9)	39.0 (3.9)	48.7 (9.3)	62.0 (16.7)	66.3 (19.1)	65.7 (18.7)	56.8 (13.8)	41.9 (5.5)	31.4 (−0.3)	27.6 (−2.4)	21.4 (−5.9)
Record low °F (°C)	4 (−16)	13 (−11)	19 (−7)	30 (−1)	39 (4)	49 (9)	57 (14)	58 (14)	42 (6)	28 (−2)	19 (−7)	9 (−13)	4 (−16)
Average precipitation inches (mm)	4.81 (122)	4.62 (117)	5.20 (132)	3.89 (99)	4.46 (113)	6.30 (160)	7.01 (178)	6.05 (154)	6.09 (155)	3.93 (100)	3.60 (91)	3.85 (98)	59.81 (1,519)
Source: NOAA

== Demographics ==
Historical population
Census	Pop.	Note	%±
1870	743		—
1880	639		−14.0%
1890	681		6.6%
1900	847		24.4%
1910	3,204		278.3%
1920	3,118		−2.7%
1930	3,788		21.5%
1940	3,888		2.6%
1950	6,505		67.3%
1960	8,874		36.4%
1970	8,334		−6.1%
1980	8,591		3.1%
1990	7,444		−13.4%
2000	6,982		−6.2%
2010	7,972		14.2%
2020	7,970		0.0%
U.S. Decennial Census

=== Racial and ethnic composition ===
Quincy city, Florida – Racial and ethnic composition Note: the U.S. census treats Hispanic/Latino as an ethnic category. This table excludes Latinos from the racial categories and assigns them to a separate category. Hispanics/Latinos may be of any race.
Race / Ethnicity (NH = Non-Hispanic)	Pop 2000	Pop 2010	Pop 2020	% 2000	% 2010	% 2020
White alone (NH)	1,979	1,594	1,507	28.34%	20.00%	18.91%
Black or African American alone (NH)	4,469	5,111	4,860	64.01%	64.11%	60.98%
Native American or Alaska Native alone (NH)	10	24	5	0.14%	0.30%	0.06%
Asian alone (NH)	16	52	34	0.23%	0.65%	0.43%
Pacific Islander or Native Hawaiian alone (NH)	0	0	0	0.00%	0.00%	0.00%
Other race alone (NH)	0	17	19	0.00%	0.21%	0.24%
Mixed race or Multiracial (NH)	27	66	123	0.39%	0.83%	1.54%
Hispanic or Latino (any race)	481	1,108	1,422	6.89%	13.90%	17.84%
Total	6,982	7,972	7,970	100.00%	100.00%	100.00%

=== 2020 census ===
As of the 2020 census, Quincy had a population of 7,970. The median age was 38.6 years. 23.3% of residents were under the age of 18 and 17.3% of residents were 65 years of age or older. For every 100 females there were 95.5 males, and for every 100 females age 18 and over there were 92.7 males age 18 and over.

91.3% of residents lived in urban areas, while 8.7% lived in rural areas.

There were 2,824 households in Quincy, of which 33.1% had children under the age of 18 living in them. Of all households, 31.7% were married-couple households, 18.4% were households with a male householder and no spouse or partner present, and 43.7% were households with a female householder and no spouse or partner present. About 28.5% of all households were made up of individuals and 13.8% had someone living alone who was 65 years of age or older.

There were 3,171 housing units, of which 10.9% were vacant. The homeowner vacancy rate was 1.1% and the rental vacancy rate was 6.3%.

=== Demographic estimates ===
By age, the population was split as such in 2020: 6.7% were under 5 years old. 49.5% of the population were female. There were 370 veterans living in Quincy and 11.2% of the population were foreign born persons.

=== Income and poverty ===
In 2020, the median value of owner-occupied housing units was $78,600. The median gross rent was $681. 76.3% of the households had a computer and 54.7% had a broadband internet subscription. 72.1% of the population 25 years and older were highschool graduates and 16.9% of that same population had a bachelor's degree or higher. The median household income was $31,756. The per capita income in a 12-month period was $17,117. 43.6% of the population lived below the poverty threshold.

=== 2010 census ===
As of the 2010 United States census, there were 7,972 people, 3,244 households, and 1,843 families residing in the city.

== Arts and culture ==
=== Museums and other points of interest ===
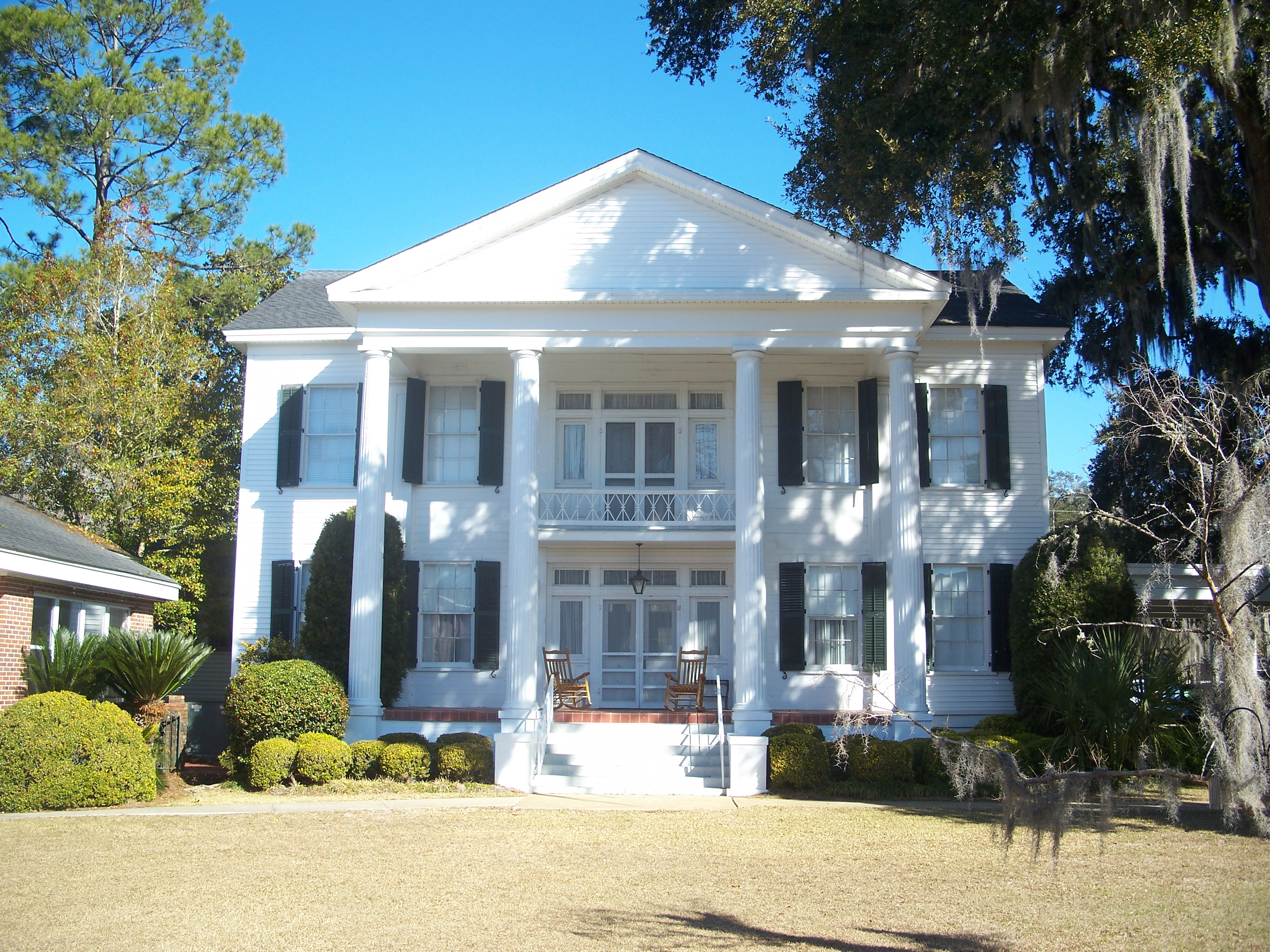
Judge Pleasants Woodson (P. W.) White House

Several locations in Quincy have been included in the National Register of Historic Places, most within the boundary of the Quincy Historic District. They are:

- E. B. Shelfer House
- E. C. Love House
- John Lee McFarlin House
- Judge P. W. White House
- Old Philadelphia Presbyterian Church
- Quincy Library
- Quincy Woman's Club
- Stockton-Curry House
- Willoughby Gregory House

The Gadsden Arts Center, an AAM accredited art museum housed in the renovated 1912 Bell & Bates hardware store, with rotating regional & national art exhibitions and a permanent collection of Vernacular Art, is also situated in the Quincy Historic District.

Also notable is the Leaf Theater, which is considered a "historic cinema treasure." It is also said to be haunted.

The North Florida Research and Education center is on Pat Thomas Parkway in Quincy.

The Florida A&M Research and Extension Center is located on Old Bainbridge Road in the St. John community of Quincy.

== Media ==
Quincy has two local papers that cover all of Gadsden County, The Gadsden County Times of Gadsden County and The Herald of the city of Havana, Florida.

== Education ==
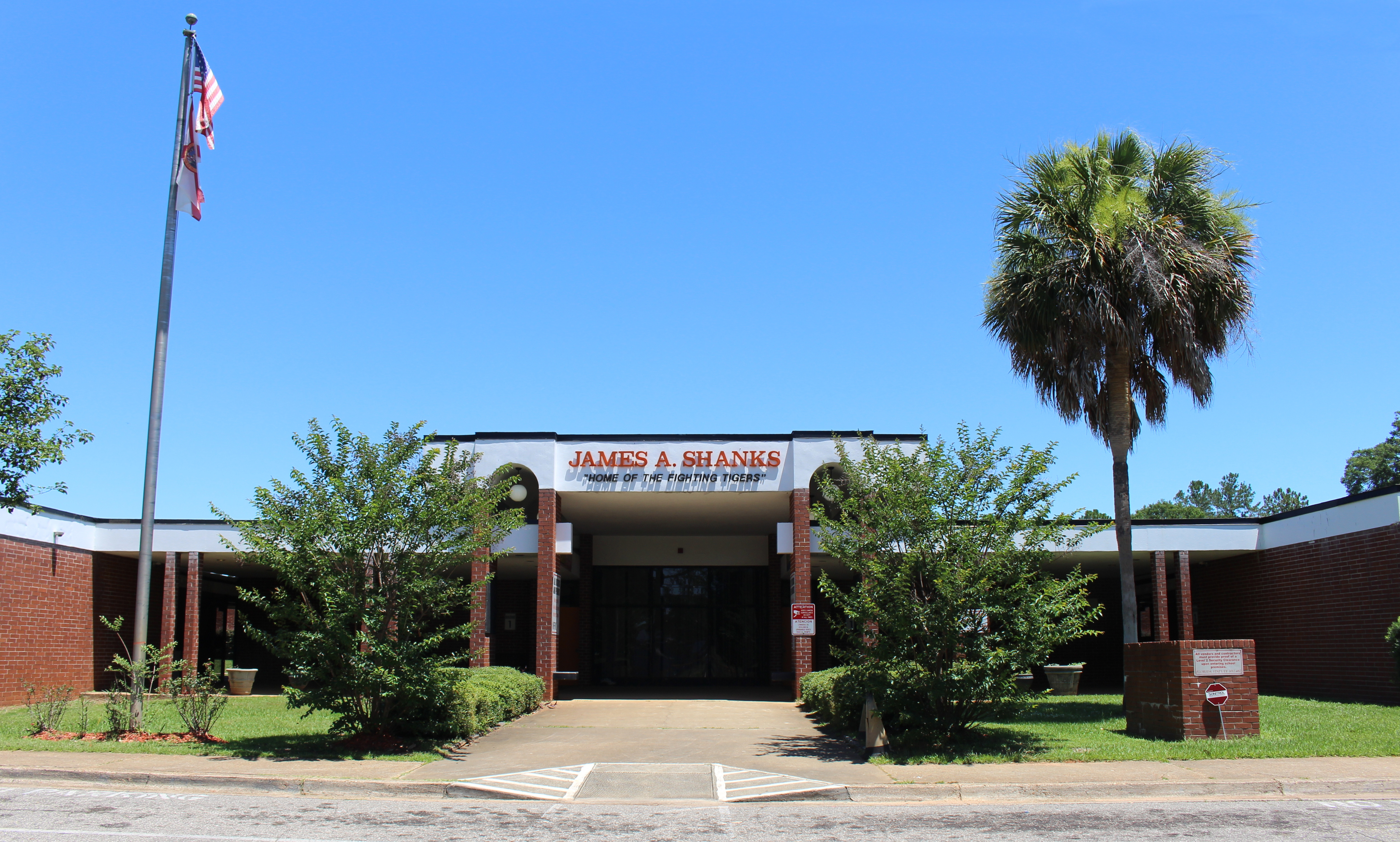
James A. Shanks Middle School (formerly James A. Shanks High School)

The Gadsden County School District operates area public schools.

- Carter-Parramore Academy School
- Chattahoochee Elementary School
- Crossroad Academy Charter School
- Gadsden Central Academy School
- Gadsden County High School
- Gadsden Elementary Magnet School
- Gadsden Technical Institute School
- George W. Munroe Elementary School
- Greensboro Elementary School
- Havana Magnet School
- James A. Shanks Middle School
- Stewart Street Elementary School
- West Gadsden Middle School

In 2003, James A. Shanks High School in Quincy and Havana Northside High School consolidated into East Gadsden High School. In 2017, East Gadsden High became the only zoned high school in the county due to the consolidation of the high school section of West Gadsden High School into East Gadsden.

Robert F. Munroe Day School, a K–12 private school which was founded as a segregation academy, has its kindergarten campus, the Robert F. Munroe Day Kindergarten, in Quincy proper. The main campus for grade 1–12 in nearby Mount Pleasant.

The Gadsden County Public Library system operates the William A. "Bill" McGill Public Library.

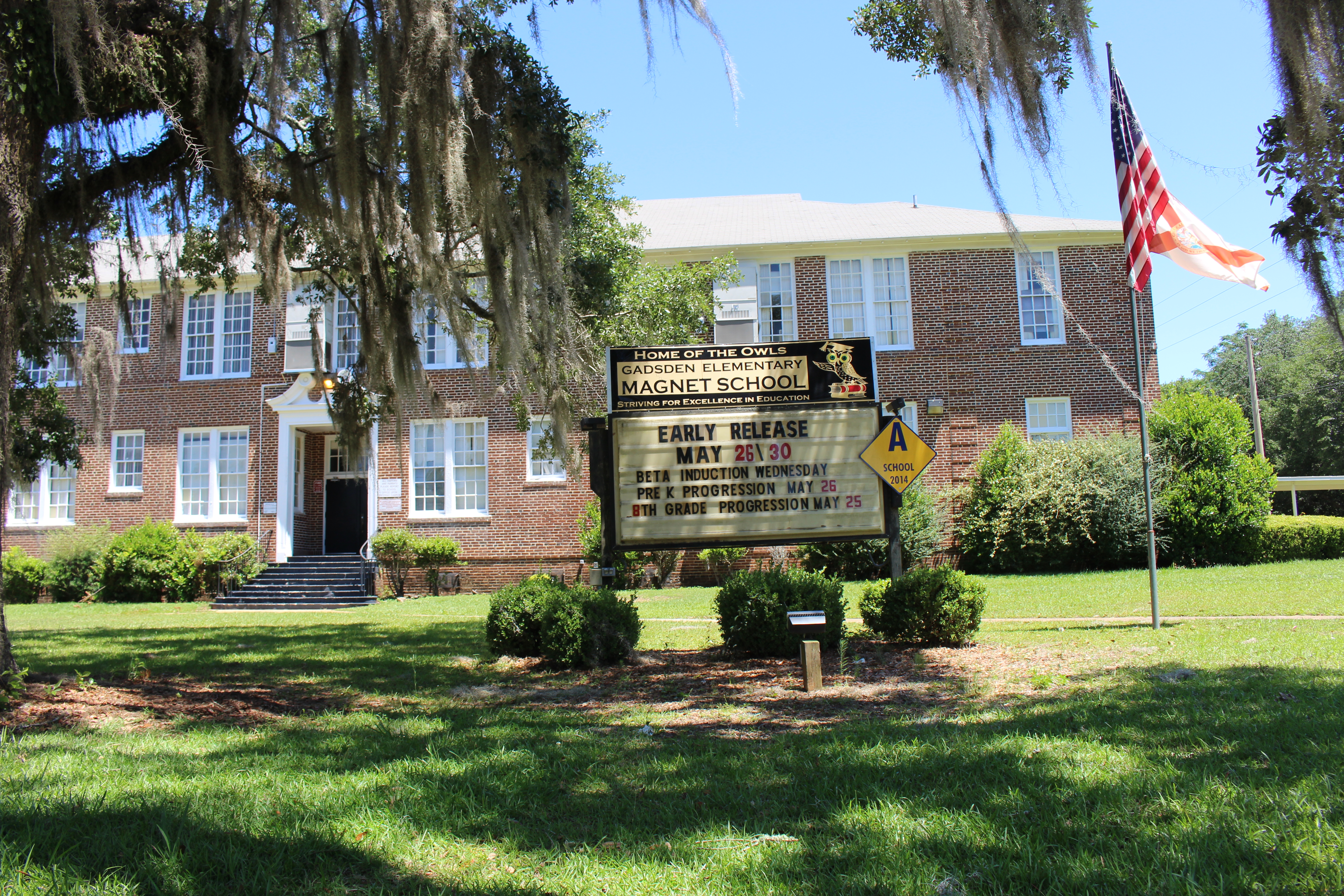
Gadsden Magnet Elementary School (former Quincy High School)

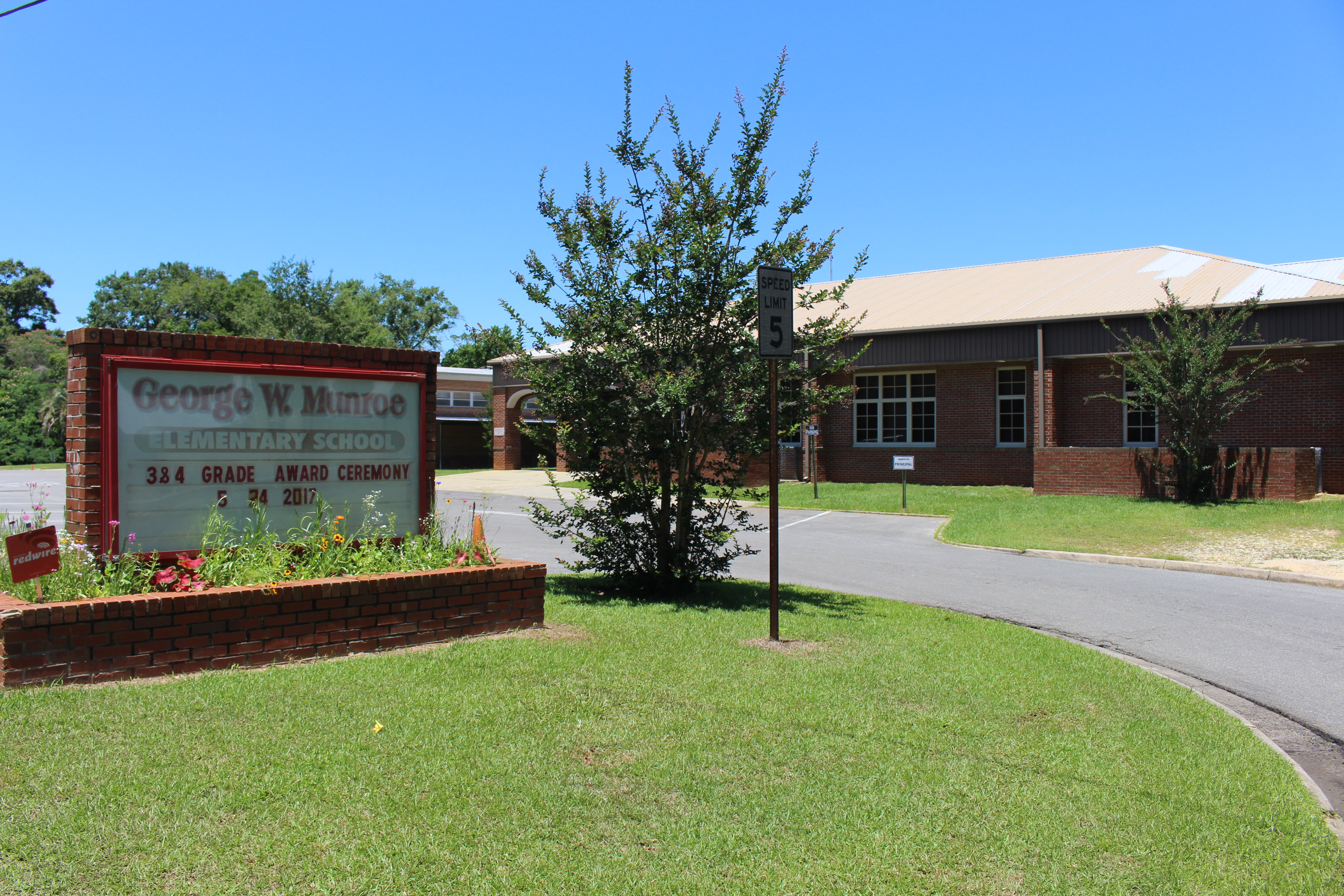
George W. Munroe Elementary School

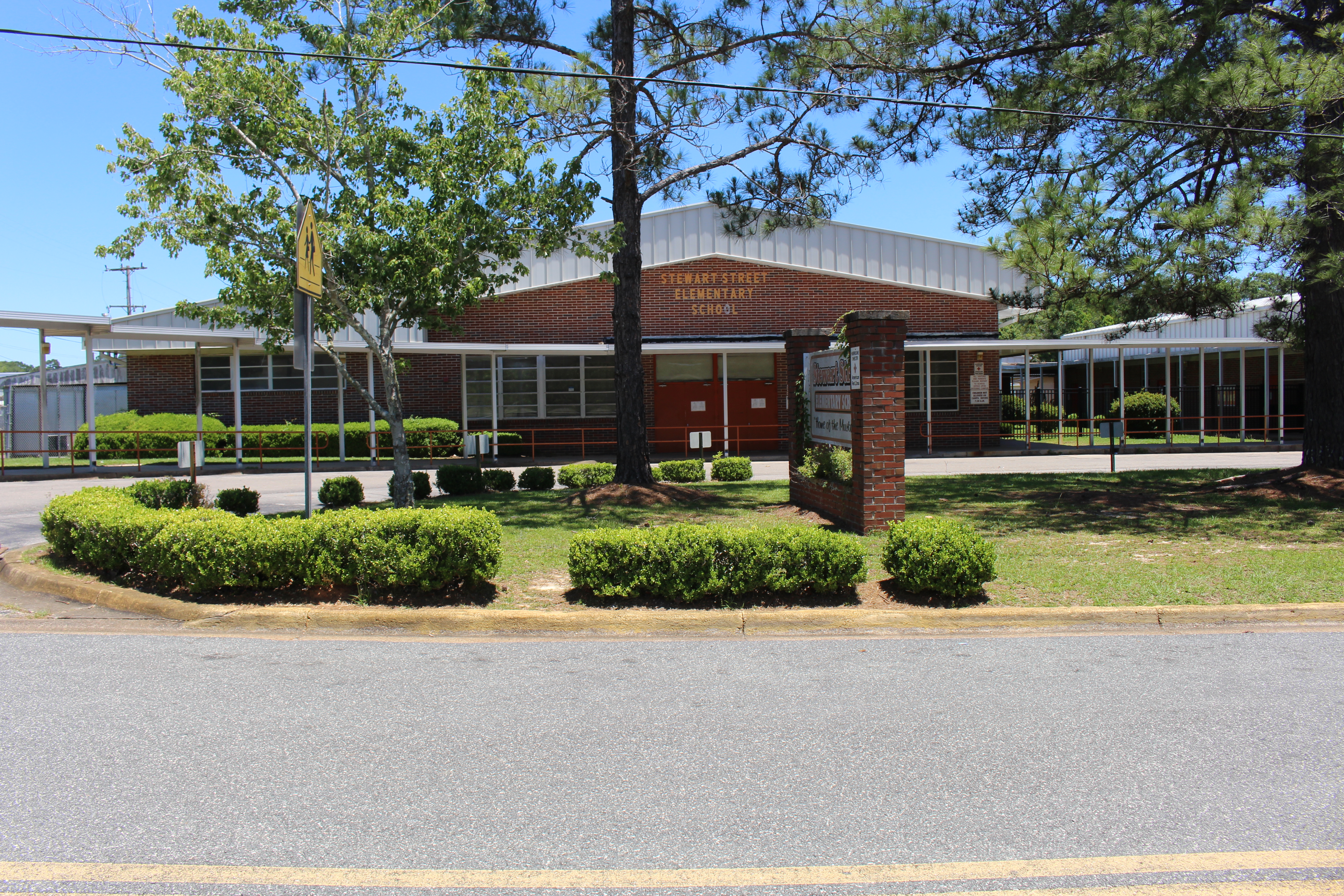
Stewart Street Elementary School

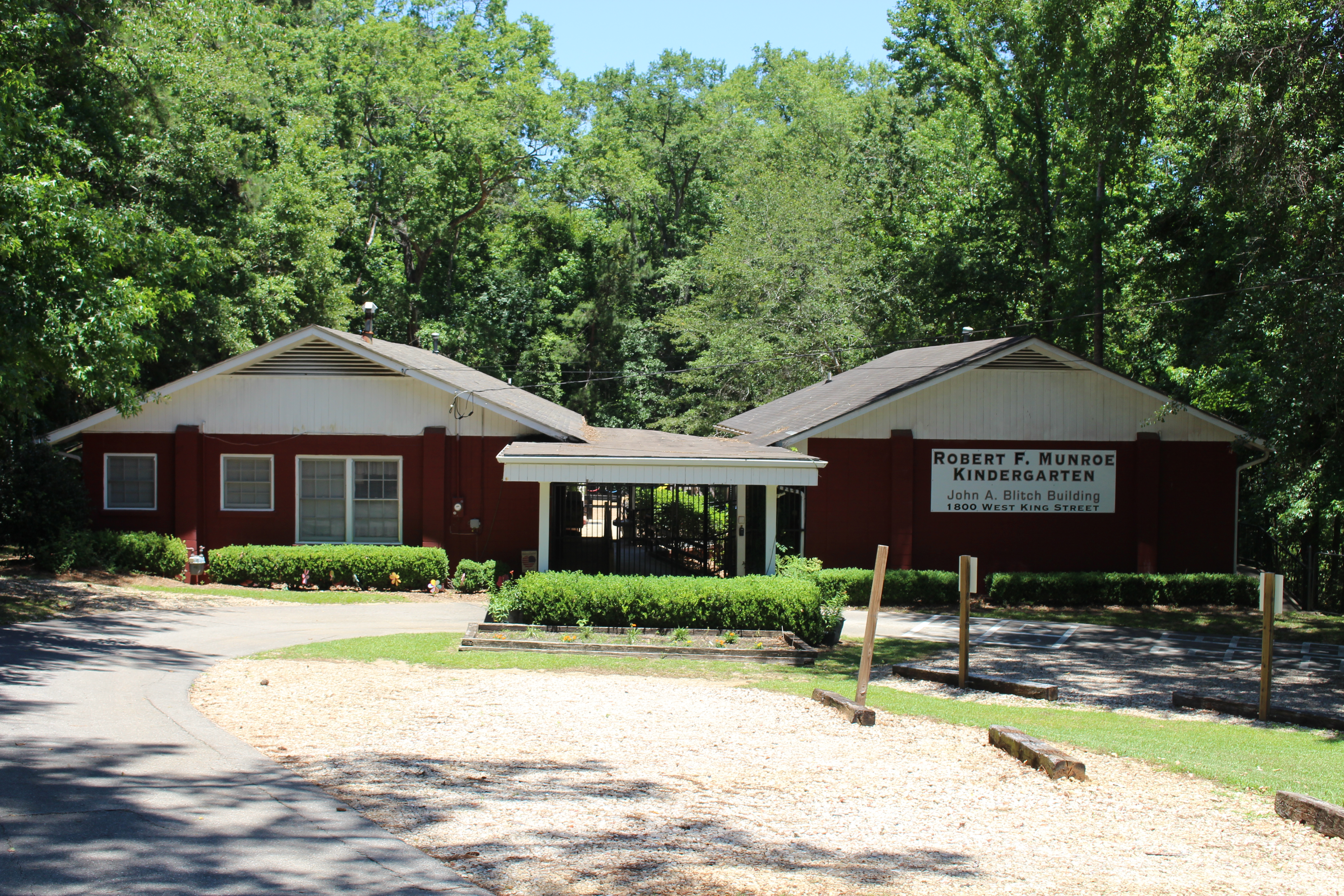
Robert F. Munroe Kindergarten (private)

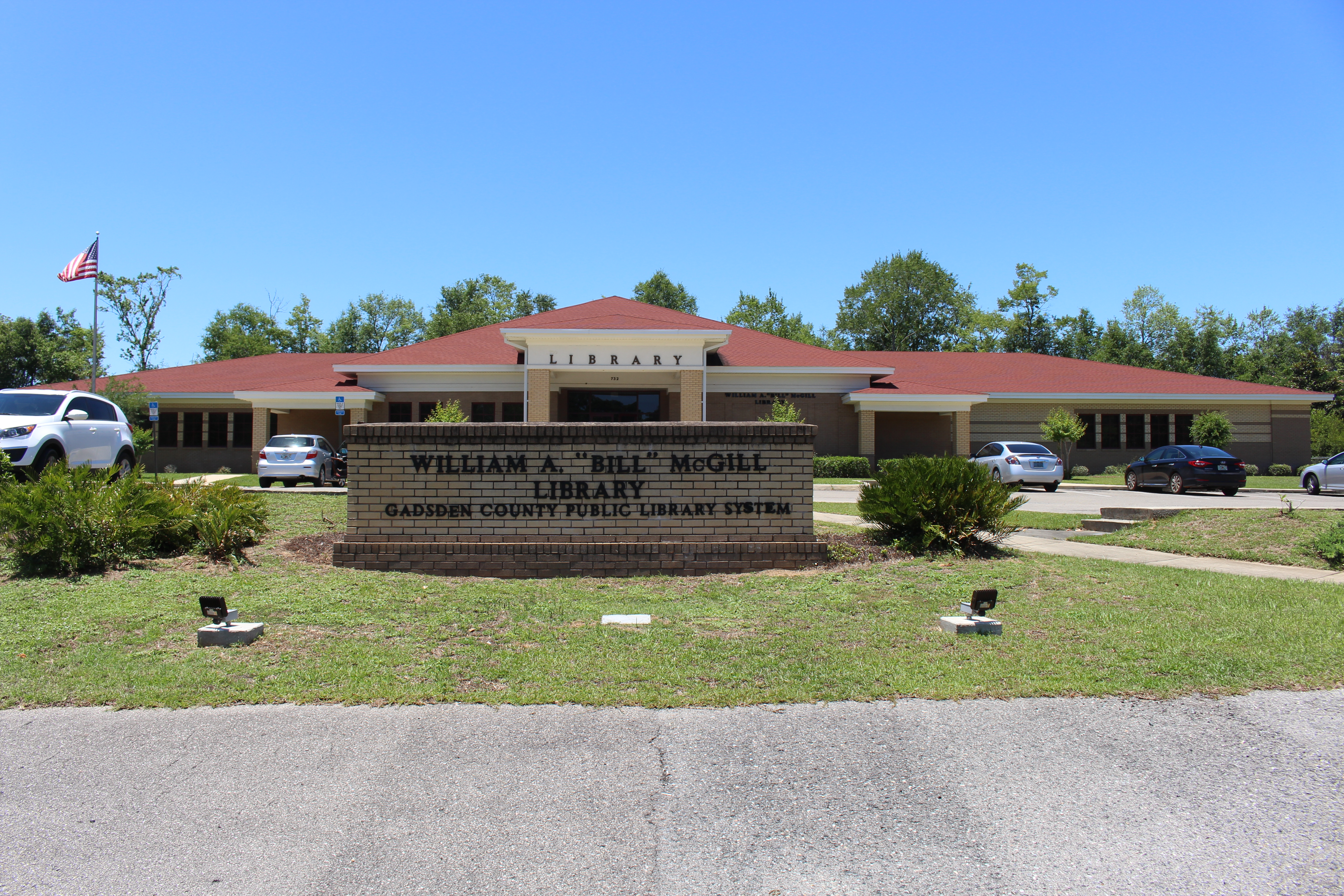
William A. "Bill" McGill Public Library

== Transportation ==
=== Highways ===
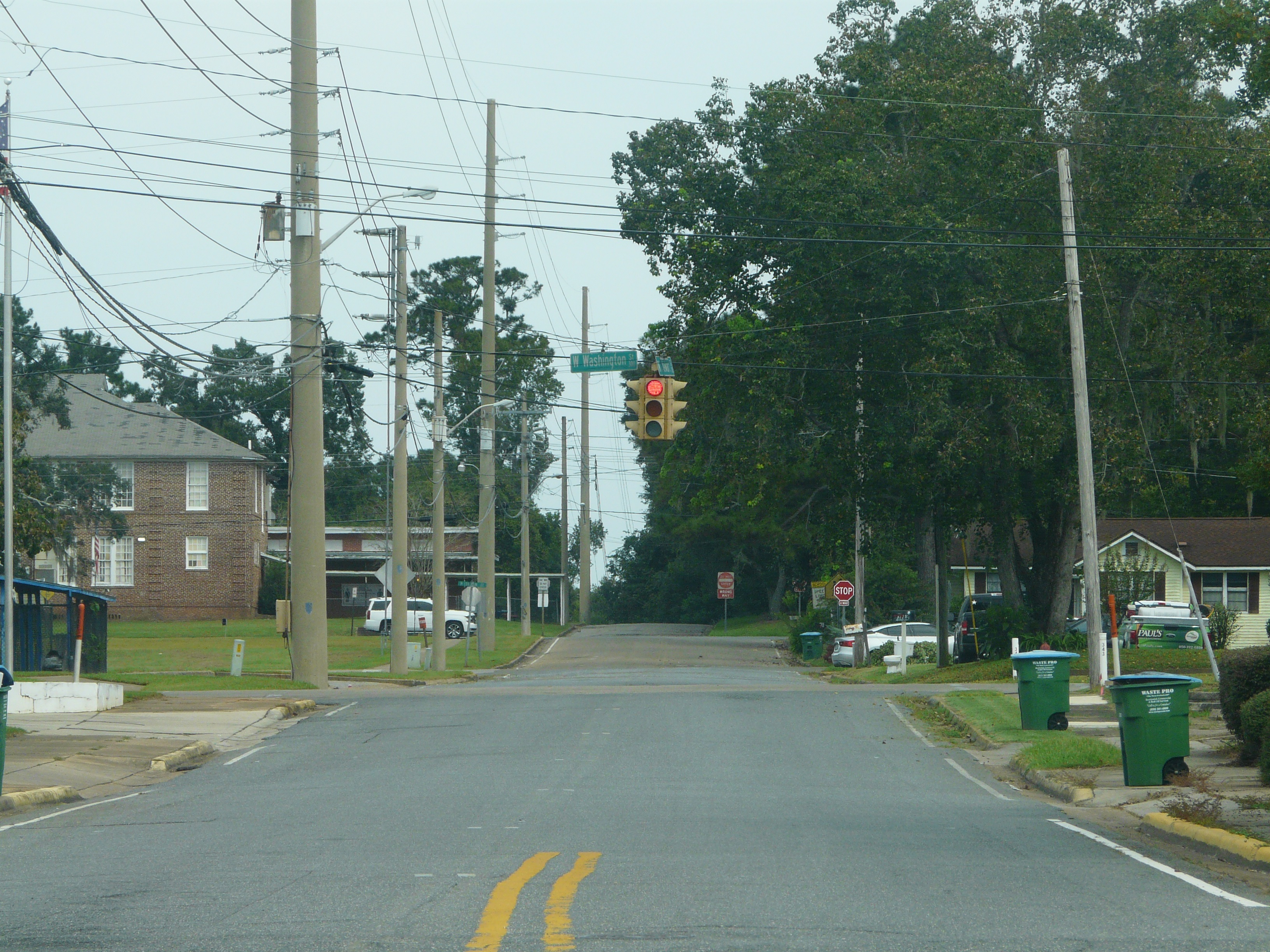
Traffic signal at Stewart St. and Washington St. in Quincy

U.S. Route 90 (Jefferson Street) is the main highway through the city; US 90 leads southeast 24 miles (39 km) to Tallahassee and northwest 19 miles (31 km) to Chattahoochee. The city limits extend south to beyond Interstate 10, which passes 3 miles (5 km) south of the center of the city. I-10 leads east 22 miles (35 km) to Tallahassee and west 170 miles (270 km) to Pensacola.

Other highways in Quincy include SR 12, which leads 12 miles (19 km) to Havana and southwest 28 miles (45 km) to Bristol; SR 267, which leads north 8 miles (13 km) to the Georgia line and south 8 miles to Wetumpka; and SR 268, which leads southeast 11 miles (18 km) to Midway.

=== Transit ===
Shuttle-bus and van transportation between Quincy and Chattahoochee, Havana, and Tallahassee is provided by Big Bend Transit, which operates three routes serving the area.

=== Railroad ===
Freight service is provided by the Florida Gulf & Atlantic Railroad, which acquired most of the former CSX main line from Pensacola to Jacksonville on June 1, 2019.

=== Airport ===
Quincy Municipal Airport is a public-use airport located 2 miles (3.2 km) northeast of the central business district.

== Coca-Cola ==
Quincy investors were largely responsible for the development of its local Coca-Cola company into a worldwide conglomerate. Quincy was once rumored to be home to many millionaires due to the Coca-Cola boom. Mark Welch “Mr Pat” Munroe, a local banker, father of 18 children by two wives, and W.C. Bradley were among the stockholders of three of the banks that released 500,000 shares of new Coca-Cola common stock. They urged widows and farmers to invest for $40 each, and several did. Eventually that stock split, and made as many as 67 accounted-for investors and Gadsden County residents rich. A single share of Coca-Cola stock bought in 1919 for $40 would be worth $6.4 million today, if all dividends had been reinvested.

== Notable people ==
- Nat Adderley Jr. (born 1955), music arranger who spent much of his career with Luther Vandross
- Elizabeth Whitfield Croom Bellamy (1837–1900), writer
- The Lady Chablis (1957–2016), born Benjamin Edward Knox, transgender entertainer
- Billy Dean (born 1962), country music singer
- Freddie Figgers (born 1989), electronics inventor and entrepreneur
- Mack Lee Hill (1940–1965), football player and American Football League
- Willy Holt (1921–2007), French-American film production designer and art director
- Dexter Jackson (born 1977), football player and Super Bowl XXXVII MVP
- Nathan Kellogg McGill, attorney who represented The Chicago Defender
- Jerrie Mock (1925–2014), first woman to fly solo around the world
- TeJyrica Robinson (born 1998), American hurdler
- Willie Simmons (born 1980), head coach of the Florida A&M Rattlers football team

== Gallery ==
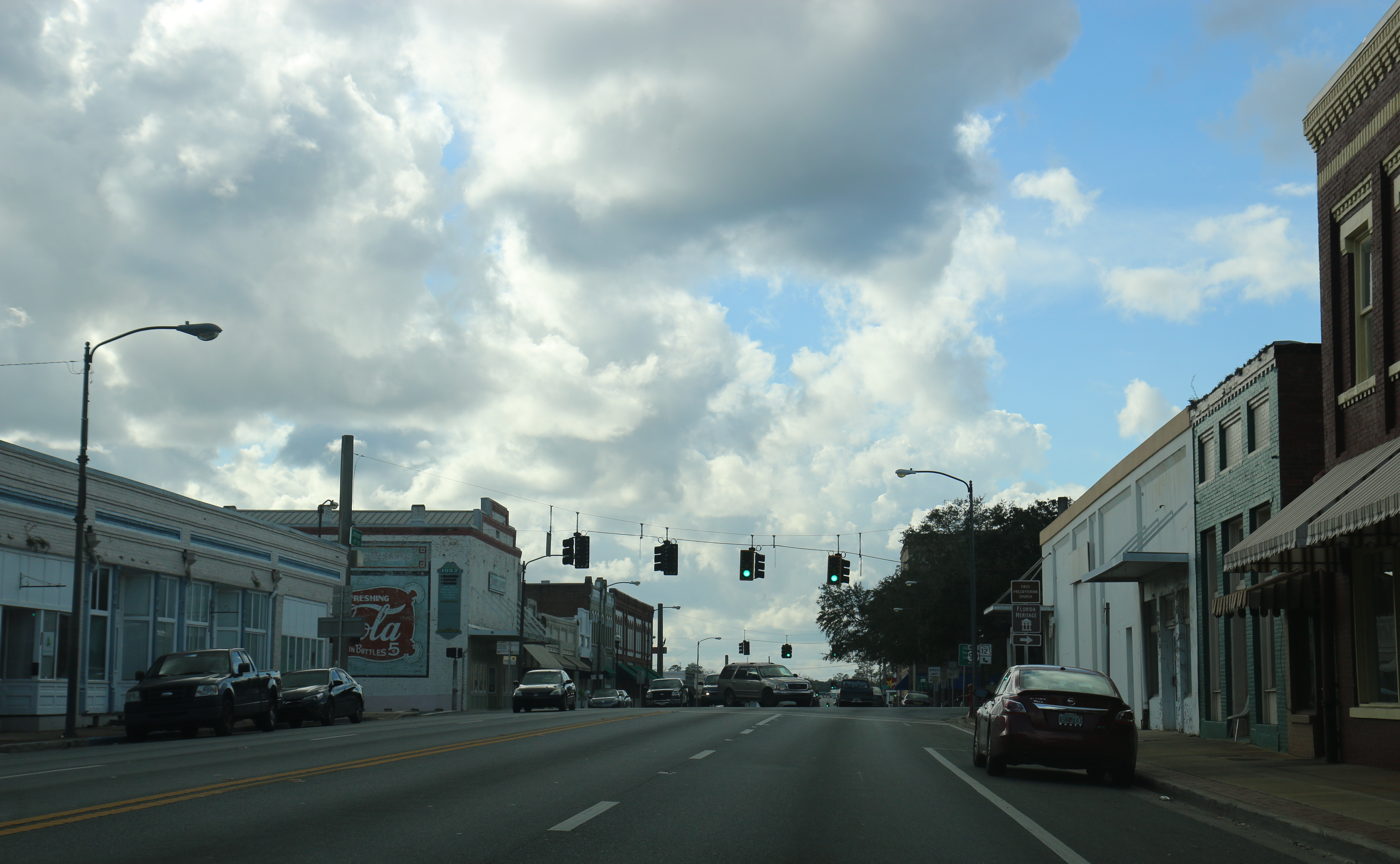
Downtown Quincy on US90

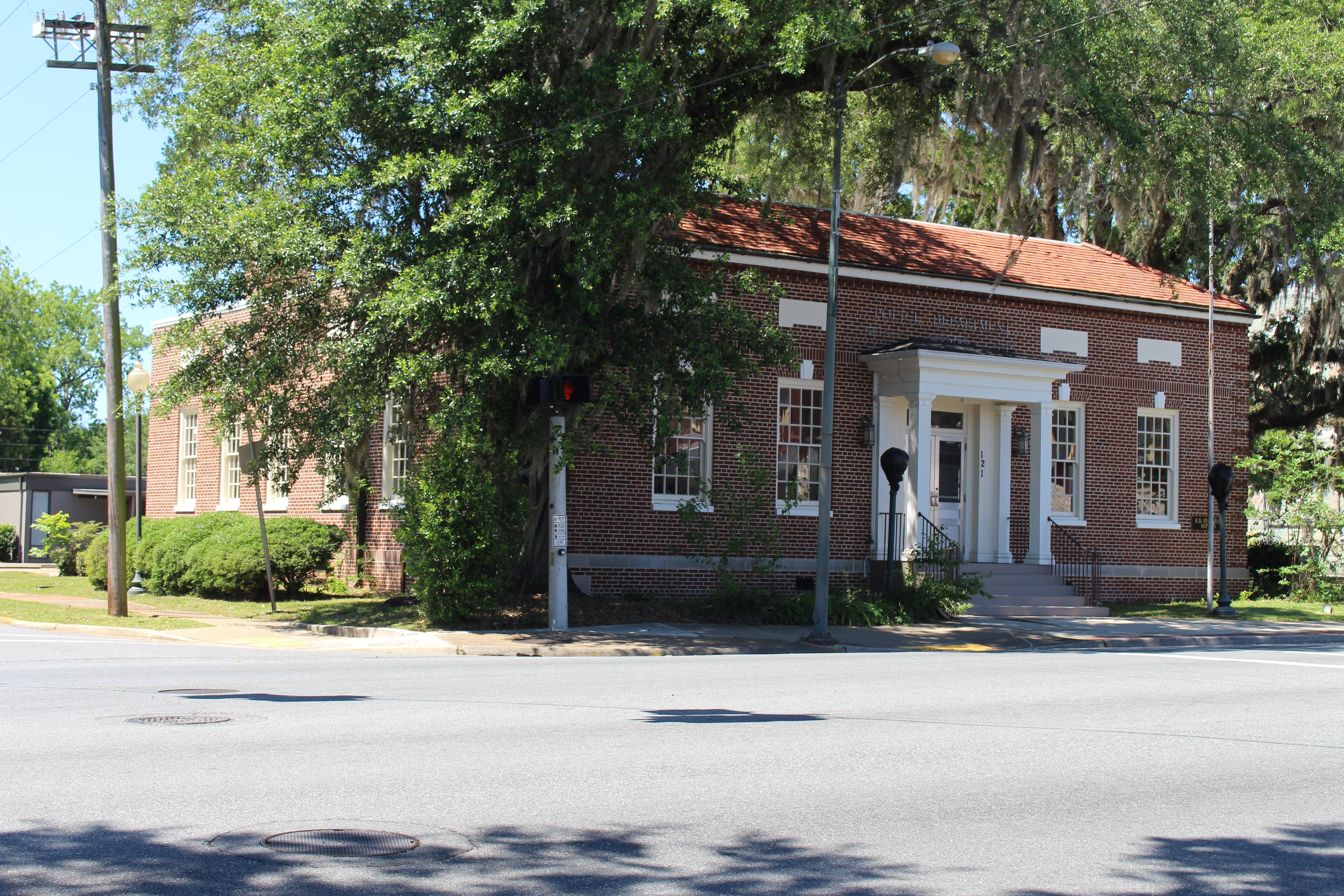
Police department

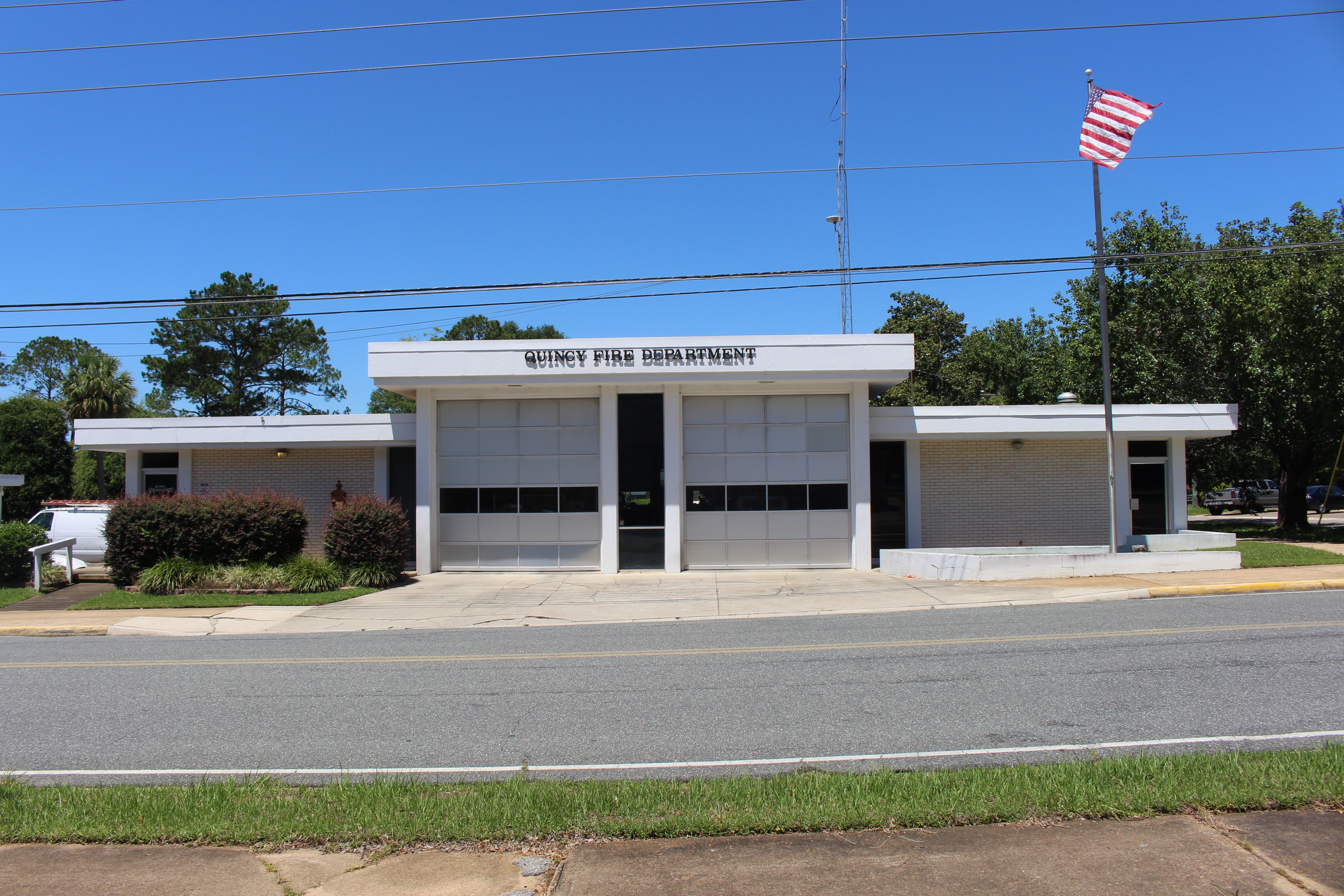
Quincy Fire Department

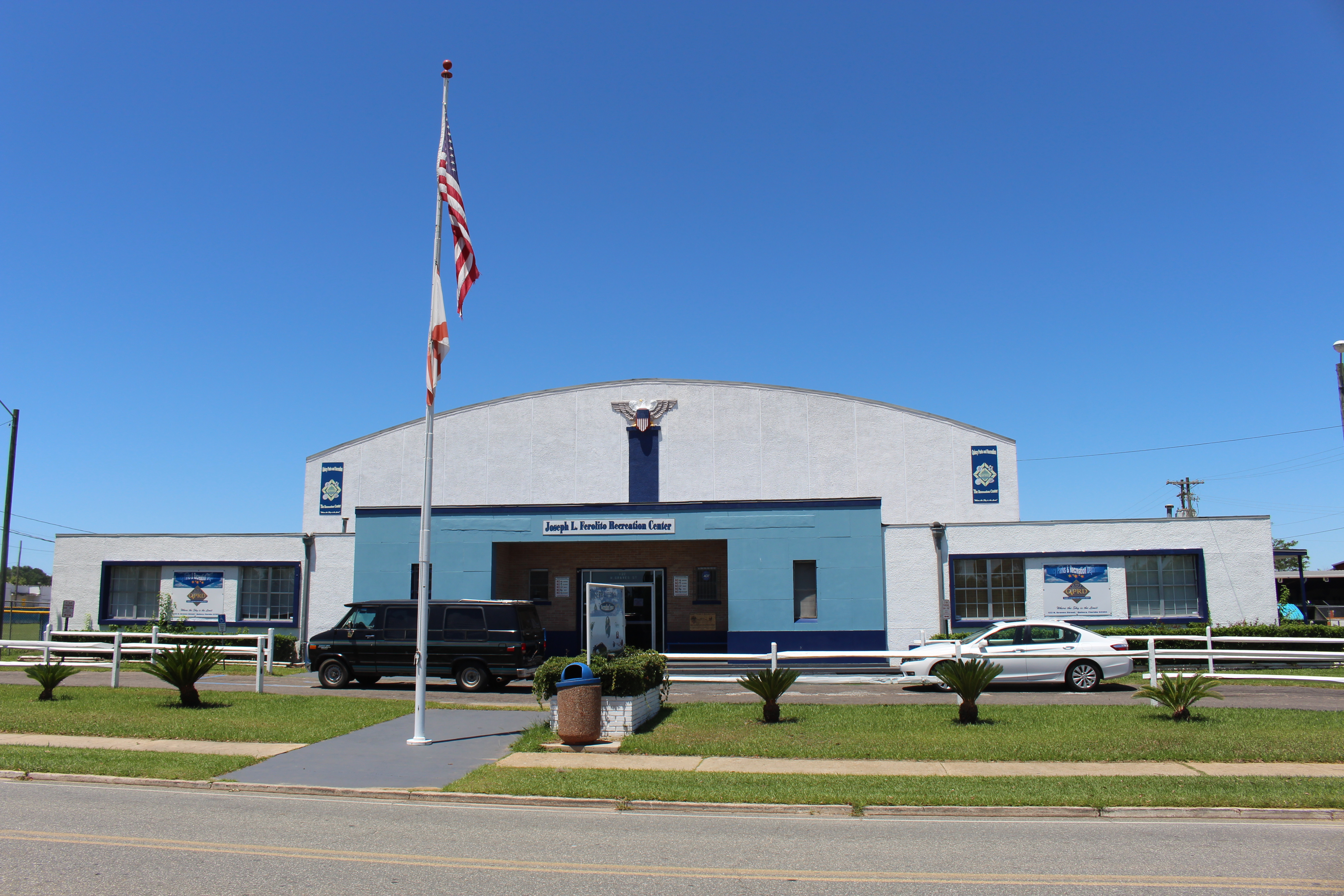
Joseph L. Ferolito Recreation Center

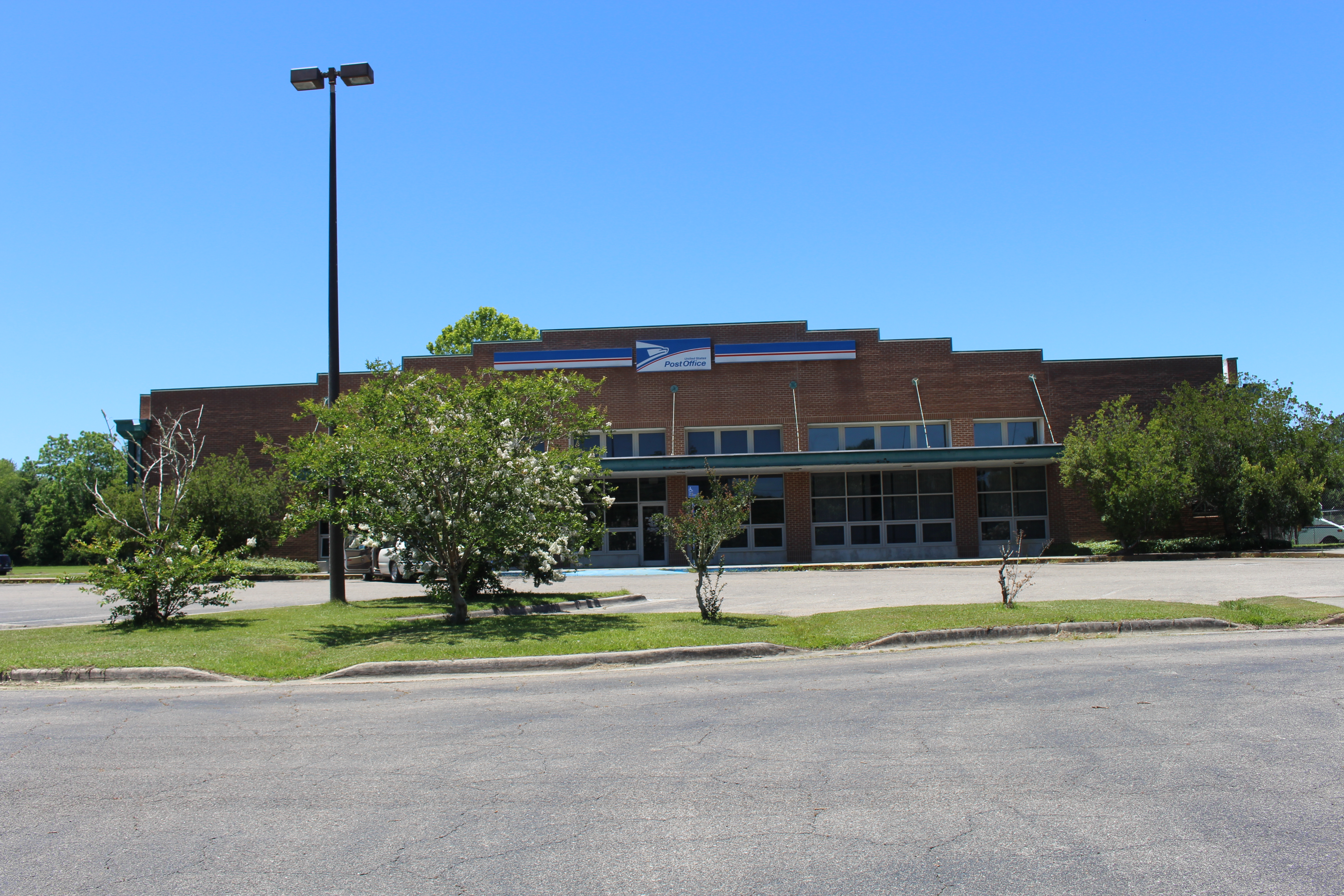
Quincy Post Office
