= Gretna, Florida =

- City
- City of Gretna
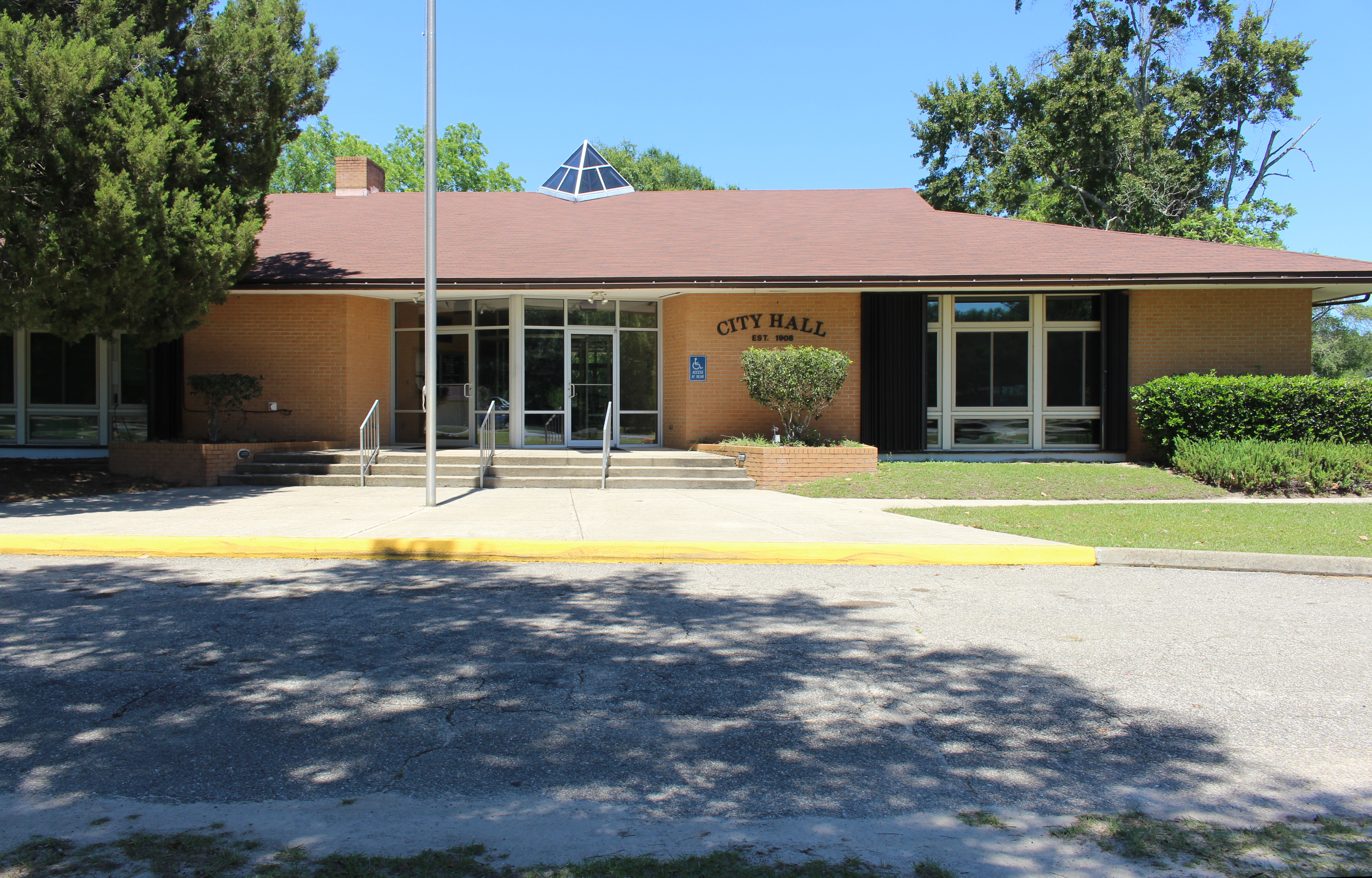
- Gretna City Hall

- Logo
- Motto(s): "A Vision for Tomorrow" "Come Grow With Us"
- Location in Gadsden County and the state of Florida
- Coordinates: 30°36′56″N 84°39′45″W
- Country: United States
- State: Florida
- County: Gadsden
- Settled: 1897
- Platted: 1905
- Incorporated: 1909

Government
  - Type: Commission–Manager
  - Mayor: Anthony J. Baker
  - Mayor Pro Tem: Jeff McNealy
  - Commissioners: Evelyn Riley Goldwire, James Payne, and Gary L. Russ-Sills
  - City Manager: Antonio Jefferson
  - City Attorney: Harold M. Knowles

Area
  - Total: 8.61 sq mi (22.30 km^{2})
  - Land: 8.56 sq mi (22.17 km^{2})
  - Water: 0.046 sq mi (0.12 km^{2})
- Elevation: 299 ft (91 m)

Population (2020)
  - Total: 1,357
  - Density: 159/sq mi (61.2/km^{2})
- Time zone: UTC-5 (Eastern (EST))
  - Summer (DST): UTC-4 (EDT)
- ZIP code: 32332
- Area code(s): 850, 448
- FIPS code: 12-27650
- GNIS feature ID: 0294791
- Website: mygretna.com

Gretna is a city in Gadsden County, Florida, United States. It is part of the Tallahassee, Florida Metropolitan Statistical Area. The majority of the population is African American, and as of the 2020 census, had 1,357 residents, down from 1,460 at the 2010 census.

The city is on U.S. 90, approximately 8 miles (13 km) south of the Florida-Georgia border.

== History ==
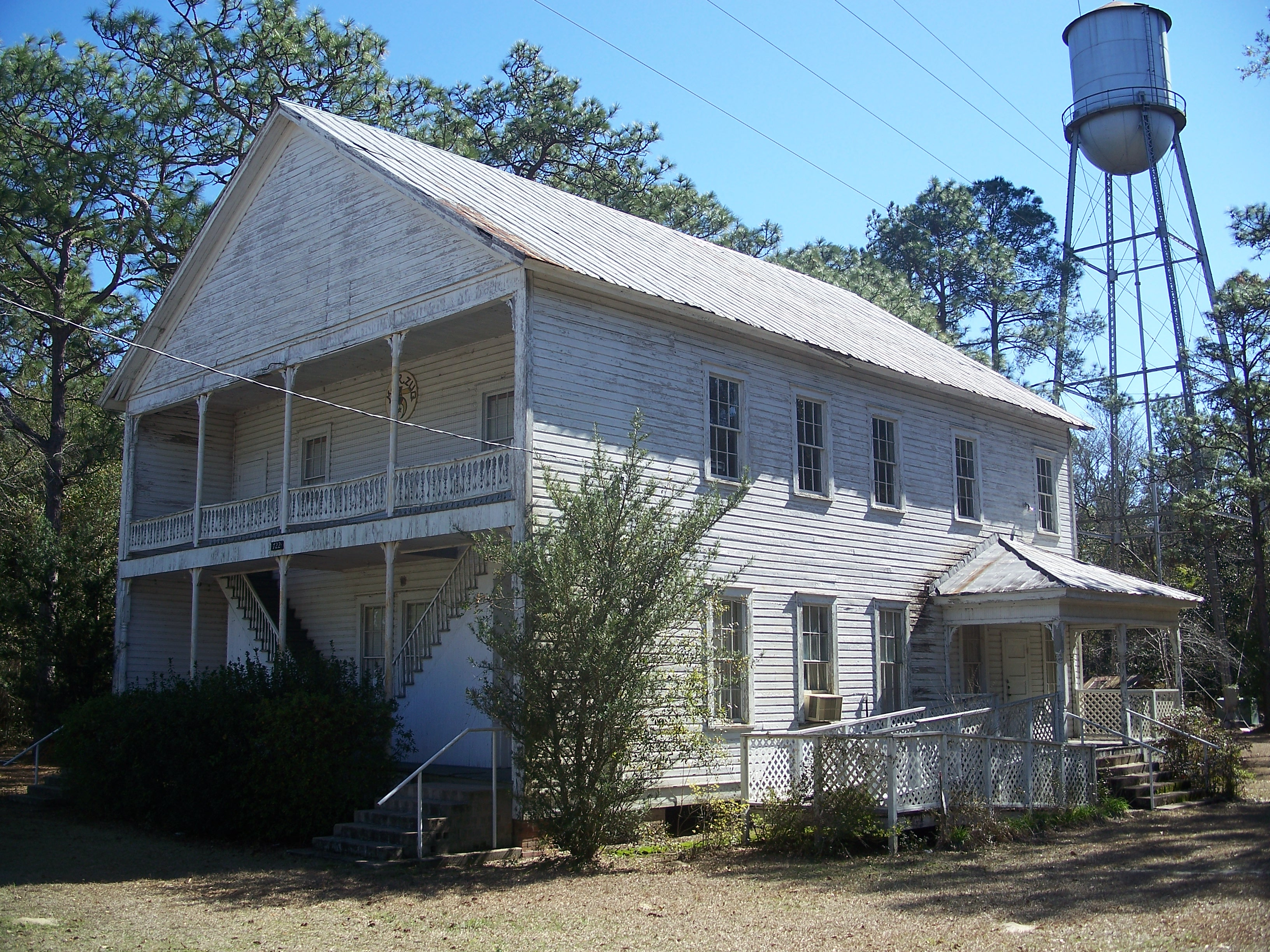
Old Gretna School building

The Gretna settlement was established in 1897 by Humphrey Company, and it was platted as a town in 1905. R. A. Gray served as principal at the Gretna School. Sunny Dell Baptist Church and school served the community until Gretna School was built in 1908. A historical marker commemorates its history. The City of Gretna was officially incorporated as a municipality in 1909.

The Florida Archives have photographs from Gretna including the Sunny Dell school, Presbyterian church, and W.P. Humphrey Company buildings including its turpentine still.

The Colored American Appeal was a Republican Party affiliated newspaper serving the community. Florida A&M University and its business school led by Sybil C. Mobley in nearby Tallahassee, Florida announced a rehabilitation program for the majority African American community in 1974.

== Geography ==
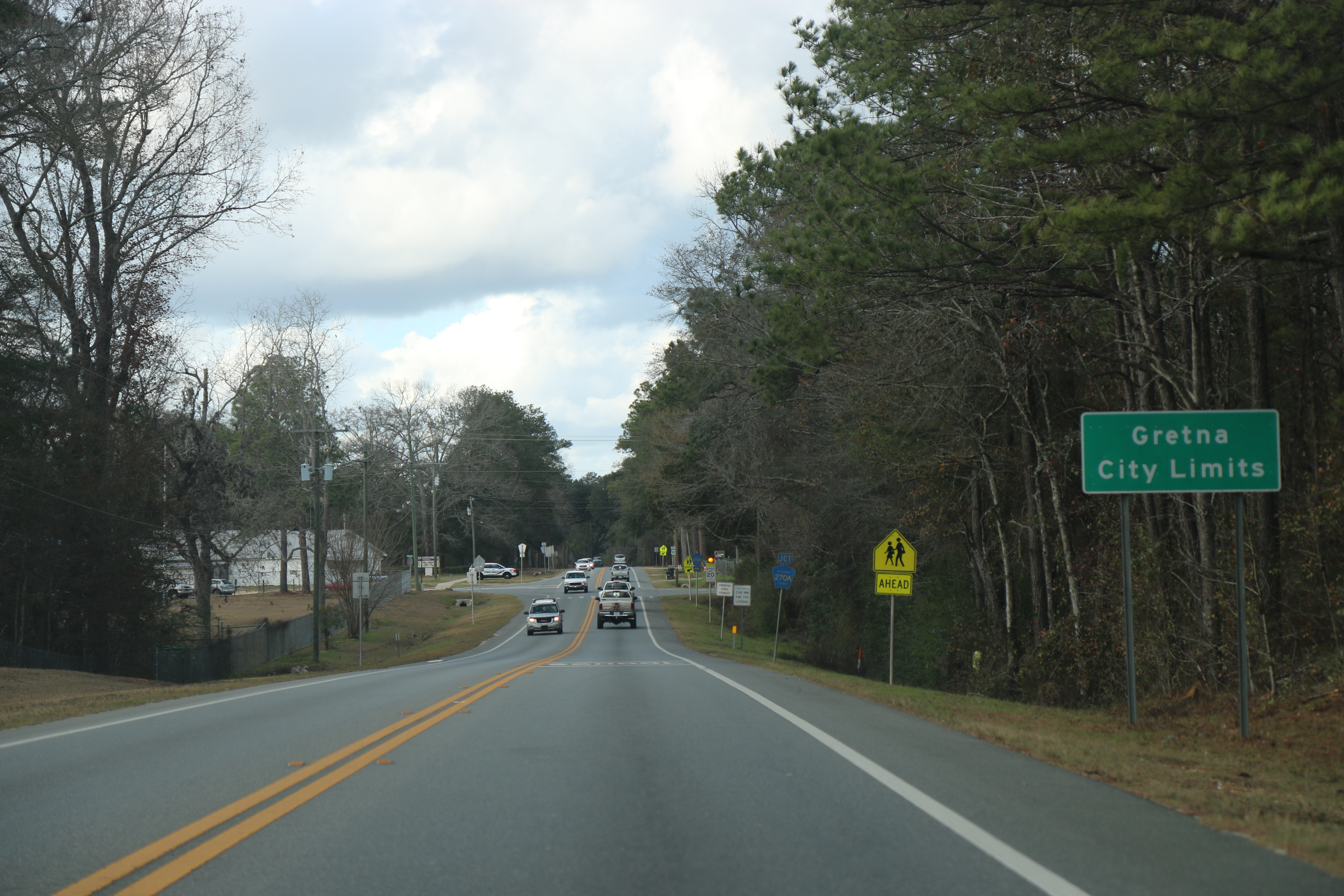
The city limits welcome sign for Gretna on U.S. Route 90

The City of Gretna is in west-central Gadsden County on the Florida Panhandle in North Florida, and its approximate coordinates is located at 30°36′56″N 84°39′45″W (30.615598, –84.662457).

The city limits have expanded south and west 5 miles (8 km) to encompass part of Interstate 10; the city is now bordered on the south by Greensboro.

U.S. Route 90 passes through Gretna as Main Street; it leads southeast 5 miles (8 km) to Quincy, the Gadsden County seat, and northwest 14 miles (23 km) to Chattahoochee.

Interstate 10 passes through the southwest part of Gretna, with access from Exit 174 (Florida State Road 12). I-10 leads east 28 miles (45 km) to Tallahassee and west 160 miles (260 km) to Pensacola. SR 12 leads southwest 24 miles (39 km) to Bristol, and SR 65 leads south 17 miles (27 km) to Hosford.

According to the United States Census Bureau, the city of Gretna has a total area of 6.0 square miles (15.6 km^{2}), of which 0.01 square miles (0.02 km^{2}), or 0.13%, is water.

== Climate ==
The climate in this area is characterized by hot, humid summers and generally mild winters. According to the Köppen climate classification, the City of Gretna has a humid subtropical climate zone (Cfa).

== Demographics ==
Historical population
Census	Pop.	Note	%±
1950	385		—
1960	647		68.1%
1970	883		36.5%
1980	1,557		76.3%
1990	1,981		27.2%
2000	1,709		−13.7%
2010	1,460		−14.6%
2020	1,357		−7.1%
U.S. Decennial Census

=== Racial and ethnic composition ===
Gretna city, Florida – Racial and ethnic composition Note: the US Census treats Hispanic/Latino as an ethnic category. This table excludes Latinos from the racial categories and assigns them to a separate category. Hispanics/Latinos may be of any race.
Race / Ethnicity (NH = Non-Hispanic)	Pop 2000	Pop 2010	Pop 2020	% 2000	% 2010	% 2020
White alone (NH)	34	40	80	1.99%	2.74%	5.90%
Black or African American alone (NH)	1,501	1,218	1,104	87.83%	83.42%	81.36%
Native American or Alaska Native alone (NH)	3	0	1	0.18%	0.00%	0.07%
Asian alone (NH)	0	0	0	0.00%	0.00%	0.00%
Native Hawaiian or Pacific Islander alone (NH)	0	0	0	0.00%	0.00%	0.00%
Other race alone (NH)	0	0	2	0.00%	0.00%	0.15%
Mixed race or Multiracial (NH)	6	8	15	0.35%	0.55%	1.11%
Hispanic or Latino (any race)	165	194	155	9.65%	13.29%	11.42%
Total	1,709	1,460	1,357	100.00%	100.00%	100.00%

=== 2020 census ===
As of the 2020 census, Gretna had a population of 1,357. The median age was 38.3 years. 22.7% of residents were under the age of 18 and 18.1% of residents were 65 years of age or older. For every 100 females, there were 97.2 males, and for every 100 females age 18 and over, there were 94.6 males age 18 and over.

0.0% of residents lived in urban areas, while 100.0% lived in rural areas.

There were 500 households in Gretna, of which 34.2% had children under the age of 18 living in them. Of all households, 27.6% were married-couple households, 19.4% were households with a male householder and no spouse or partner present, and 46.6% were households with a female householder and no spouse or partner present. About 29.2% of all households were made up of individuals and 13.6% had someone living alone who was 65 years of age or older.

There were 585 housing units, of which 14.5% were vacant. The homeowner vacancy rate was 1.9% and the rental vacancy rate was 15.5%.

According to the Census Bureau's 2020 American Community Survey 5-year estimates, there were 497 households and 259 families residing in the city.

=== 2010 census ===
As of the 2010 United States census, there were 1,460 people, 481 households, and 394 families residing in the city.

=== 2000 census ===
As of the census of 2000, there were 1,709 people, 503 households, and 401 families residing in the city. The population density was 906.7 inhabitants per square mile (350.1/km^{2}). There were 553 housing units at an average density of 293.4 per square mile (113.3/km^{2}). The racial makeup of the city was 88.41% African American, 6.14% White, 0.18% Native American, 0.12% Asian, 4.68% from other races, and 0.47% from two or more races. Hispanic or Latino of any race were 9.65% of the population.

In 2000, there were 503 households, out of which 41.0% had children under the age of 18 living with them, 41.0% were married couples living together, 31.2% had a female householder with no husband present, and 20.1% were non-families. 18.1% of all households were made up of individuals, and 6.6% had someone living alone who was 65 years of age or older. The average household size was 3.40 and the average family size was 3.84.

In 2000, in the city, the population was spread out, with 35.0% under the age of 18, 11.2% from 18 to 24, 28.1% from 25 to 44, 17.7% from 45 to 64, and 8.0% who were 65 years of age or older. The median age was 28 years. For every 100 females, there were 93.5 males. For every 100 females age 18 and over, there were 87.2 males.

In 2000, the median income for a household in the city was $24,769, and the median income for a family was $26,176. Males had a median income of $20,819 versus $17,955 for females. The per capita income for the city was $9,062. About 25.9% of families and 30.6% of the population were below the poverty line, including 43.3% of those under age 18 and 24.2% of those age 65 or over.

== Government and infrastructure ==
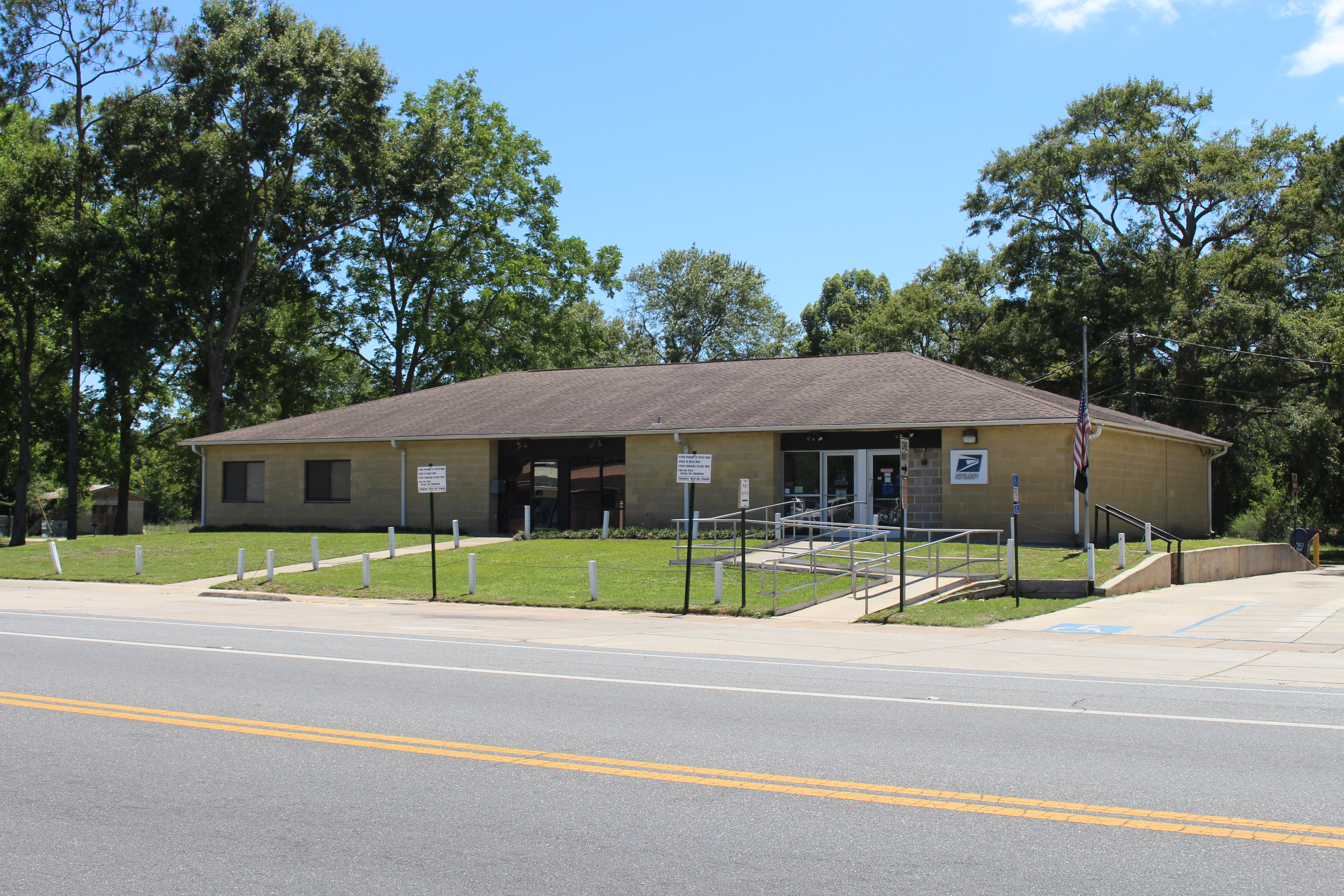
Gretna Post Office

The U.S. Postal Service operates the Gretna Post Office.

The county government operates the Brenda A. Holt Gadsden County Gretna Public Safety Complex.

The Gretna Volunteer Fire Department operates one fire station.

The Gadsden Connector, a Big Bend Transit bus route, has a stop in Gretna.

== Education ==
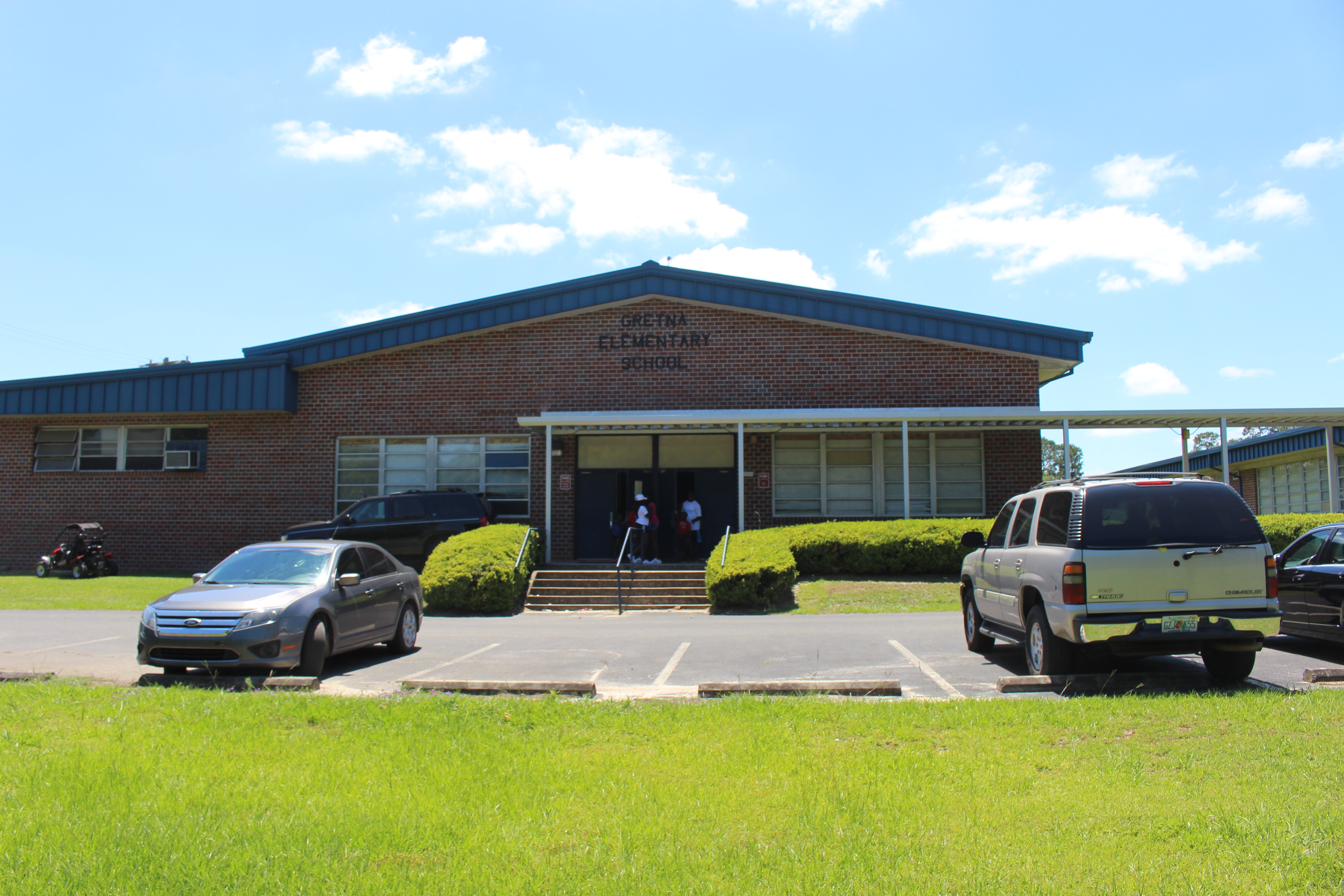
Gretna Elementary School (closed in 2017)

The Gadsden County School District operates area public schools. Residents in PreK–3 are served by Greensboro Primary School and residents in grades 4–5 are served by West Gadsden Middle School. Gretna Elementary School, which previously served elementary school students, closed in 2017.

As of 2017 Gadsden County High School (previously East Gadsden High School) is the only zoned high school in the county, due to the consolidation of West Gadsden High School's high school section into East Gadsden High.

== Gallery ==
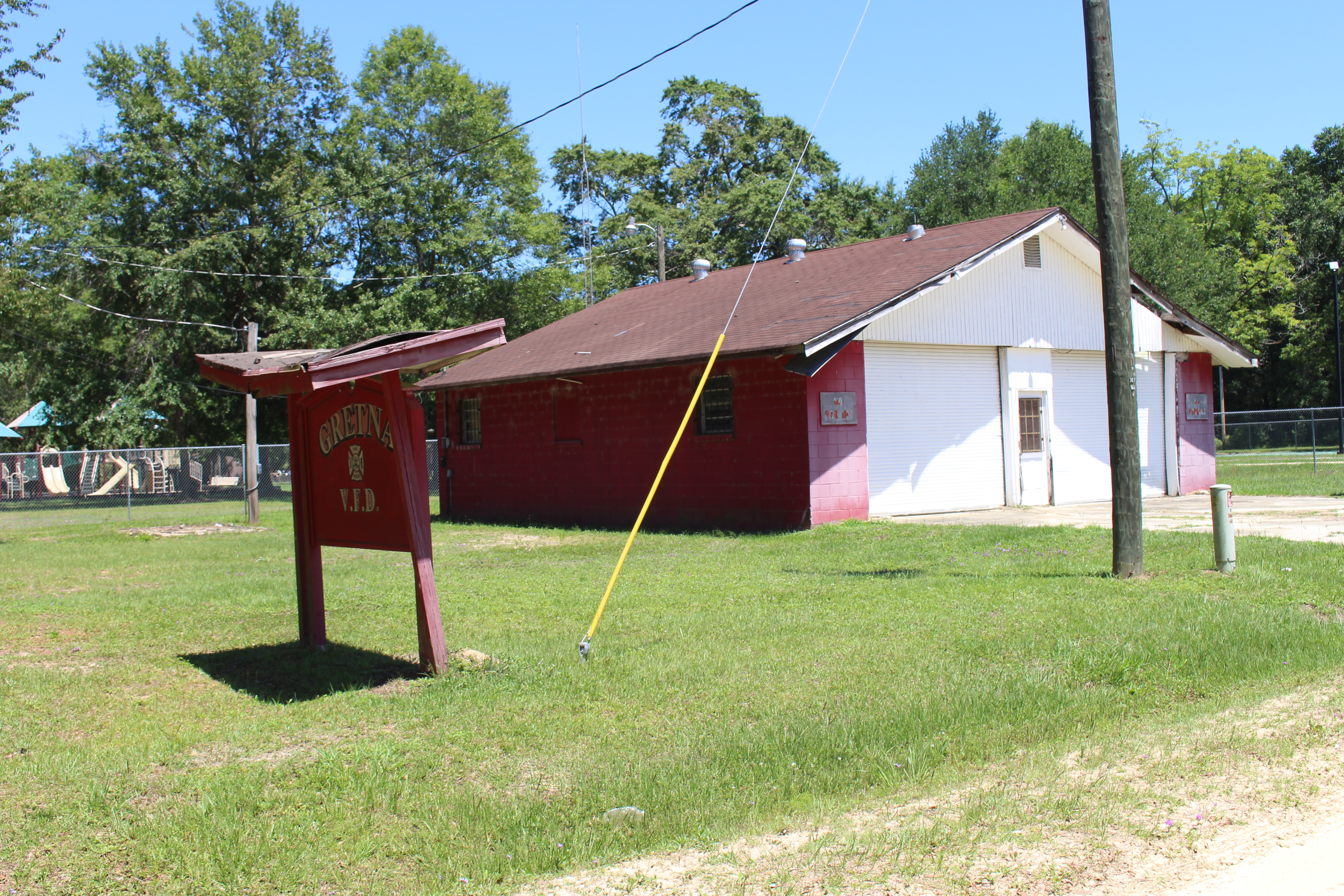
Gretna Volunteer Fire Department

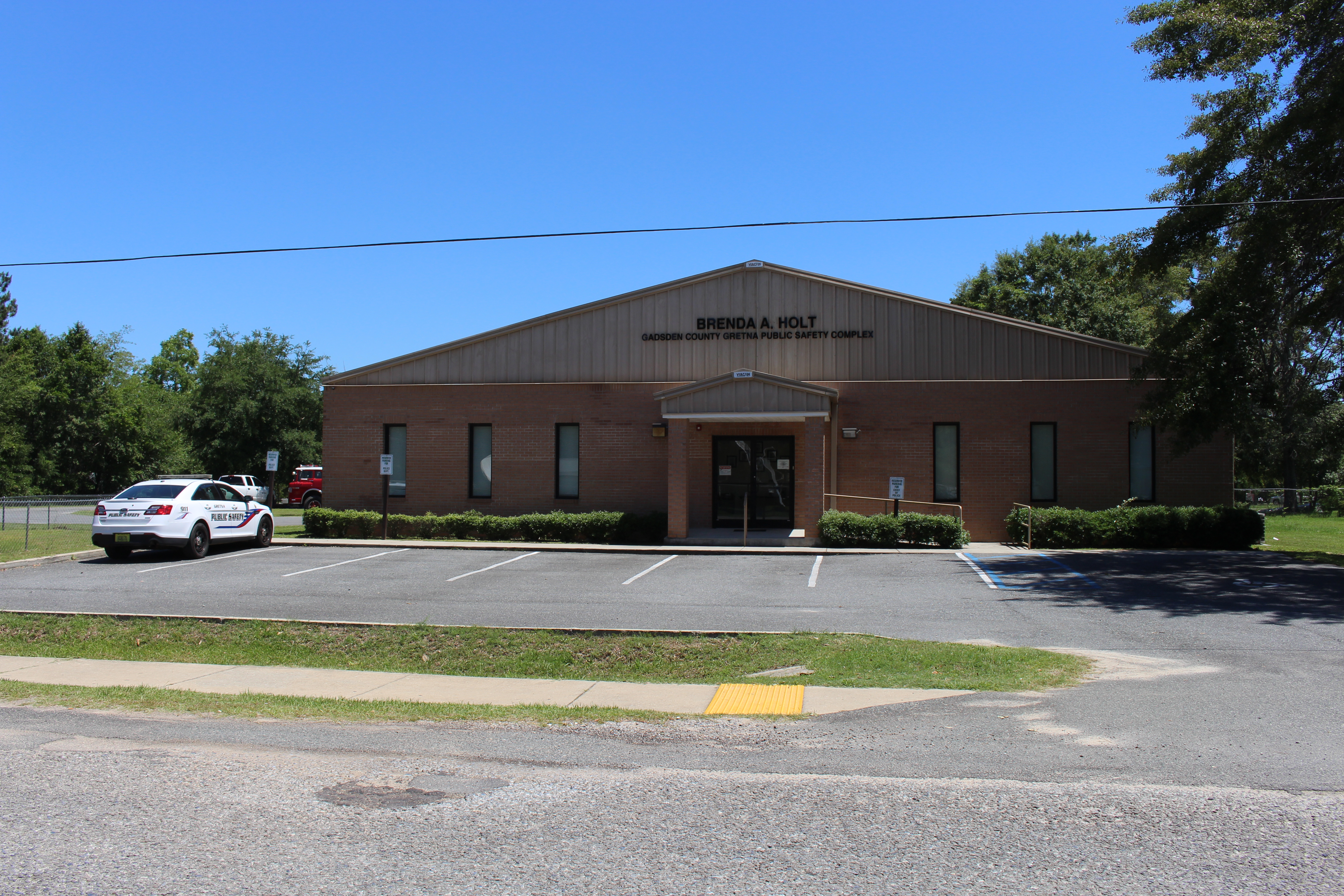
Brenda A. Holt Gadsden County Gretna Public Safety Complex
