= WVFT =

- Gretna, Florida; United States
- Broadcast area: Tallahassee, Florida
- Frequency: 93.3 MHz
- Branding: Real Talk 93.3

Programming
- Format: Talk

Ownership
- Owner: 923 Ventures LLC

History
- First air date: 1989
- Former call signs: WGWD (1987–2012)

Technical information
- Licensing authority: FCC
- Facility ID: 15979
- Class: C3
- ERP: 8,700 watts
- HAAT: 152 meters
- Transmitter coordinates: 30°29′48.00″N 84°27′33.00″W

Links
- Public license information: Public file; LMS
- Webcast: Listen Live
- Website: realtalk93.com

WVFT (93.3 FM) is a radio station broadcasting a talk radio format. Licensed to Gretna, Florida, United States, it serves the Tallahassee area. The station is currently owned by Magic Broadcasting. Studios are located near the interchange of Monroe Street and I-10 in Tallahassee, and its transmitter is in Midway, Florida.

On April 16, 2012, the then-WGWD changed its format to talk, and is now branded as "Real Talk 93.3". On December 10, 2012, the station changed its call sign to the current WVFT.
