= Chattahoochee, Florida =

- City
- City of Chattahoochee
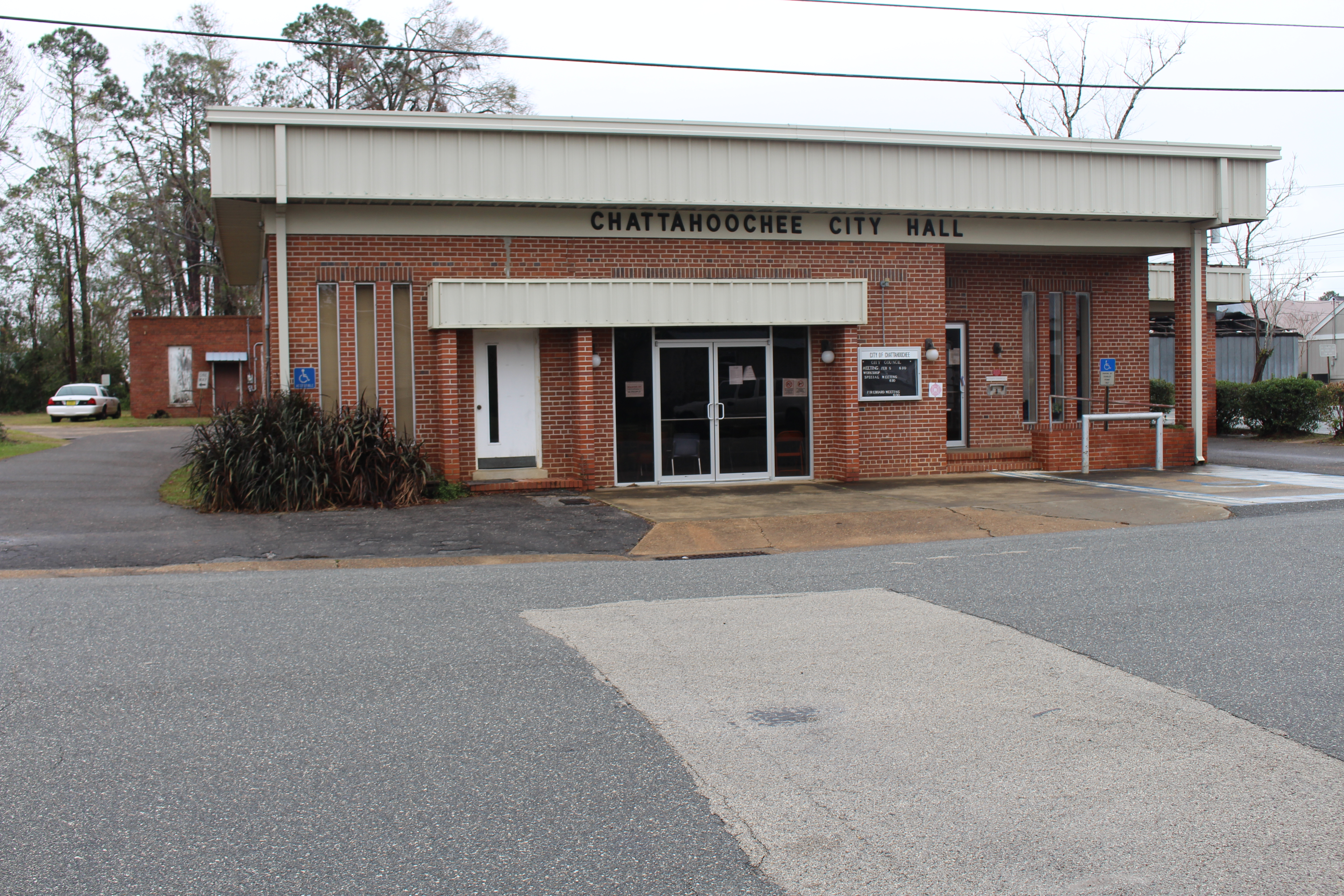
- Chattahoochee City Hall

- Seal
- Nickname: The Hooch
- Motto(s): "A Great Place to Live and Retire"
- Location in Gadsden County and the state of Florida
- Coordinates: 30°42′N 84°50′W
- Country: United States
- State: Florida
- County: Gadsden
- Settled (Mount Vernon): c. 1820s
- Incorporated (town): January 22, 1834
- Incorporated (city): 1921

Government
  - Type: Council–Manager
  - Mayor: Ken Kimrey
  - Mayor Pro Tem: Amy Glass
  - Council Members: Christopher Moultry, Ann Williams, and Ann Richardson
  - City Manager: Robert Presnell
  - City Clerk: Amanda Applewhite

Area
  - Total: 5.80 sq mi (15.01 km^{2})
  - Land: 5.60 sq mi (14.51 km^{2})
  - Water: 0.19 sq mi (0.50 km^{2})
- Elevation: 236 ft (72 m)

Population (2020)
  - Total: 2,955
  - Density: 527.6/sq mi (203.71/km^{2})
- Time zone: UTC-5 (Eastern (EST))
  - Summer (DST): UTC-4 (EDT)
- ZIP code: 32324
- Area code(s): 850, 448
- FIPS code: 12-11800
- GNIS feature ID: 0280346
- Website: www.chattgov.org

Chattahoochee is a city in Gadsden County, Florida, United States. Its colonial history dates back to the Spanish West Florida and Florida Territory era. It is part of the Tallahassee, Florida Metropolitan Statistical Area. The population was 2,955 as of the 2020 census, down from 3,652 at the 2010 census.

== History ==
The area was inhabited by indigenous people who, during the Mississippian era, built earthwork mounds in the area called the Chattahoochee Landing Mounds. It was later occupied by the Creek people, who were eventually pushed out by European encroachment from the Spanish and British, and later on, white Americans.

After European-Americans settled in this area in the early 19th century, residents first named the community "Mount Vernon" in the 1820s. This was in honor of former President George Washington's Virginia plantation.

The community was later renamed "Chattahoochee" because the U.S. Postal Service kept confusing the mail with Mount Vernon, Alabama. Chattahoochee is a name derived from the Creek-Muskogee language, meaning "marked rocks", from chato ("rock") plus huchi ("marked"), and was named after the rocks found along the Chattahoochee River that looked "painted" or "marked".

The British had built a fort, Nicolls' Outpost, when they controlled the area. The Scott Massacre of 1817 took place here. A ferry was established to give travelers and tradesmen access to other settlements across the river.

The community has been a colonial settlement since the 1820s, and was officially incorporated as the "Town of Chattahoochee" on January 22, 1834, later becoming the City of Chattahoochee in 1921.

== Geography ==
Chattahoochee is located in the northwest corner of Gadsden County at 30°42′N 84°50′W (30.703, –84.847). It is bordered to the west by the Apalachicola River, formed by the juncture of the Chattahoochee and Flint rivers within Lake Seminole just north of the city. The northern border of Chattahoochee follows the Florida–Georgia state line, and the Apalachicola River forms the Gadsden–Jackson county line.

Chattahoochee sits on the banks of the Apalachicola River. It is connected by the Apalachicola and Victory bridges to neighboring Sneads, Florida, which is in Jackson County.

U.S. Route 90 passes through the middle of Chattahoochee as Washington Street; it leads southeast 19 miles (31 km) to Quincy, the Gadsden County seat, and west 5 miles (8 km) to Sneads and 24 miles (39 km) to Marianna. Tallahassee, the state capital, is 43 miles (69 km) to the southeast. Main Street (Little Sycamore Road outside the city limits) leads south 6 miles (10 km) via Flat Creek Road to Interstate 10 at Exit 166.

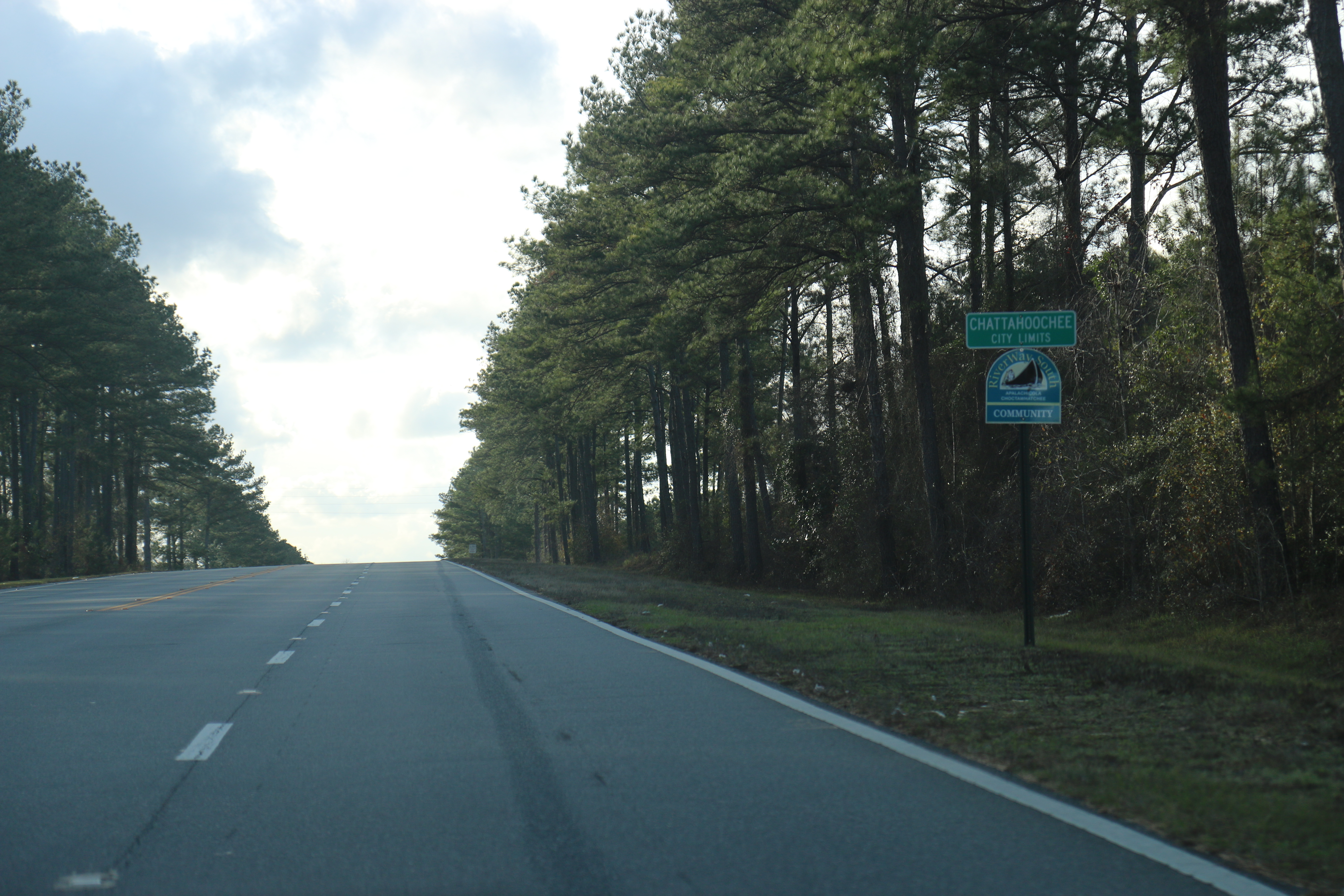
The sign for Chattahoochee on U.S. Route 90

The southern part of the city includes the community of River Junction at 30°41′N 84°50′W (30.686, –84.841). In the mid-1880s, River Junction was established as a railroad connection point between the Florida Central and Western Railroad, later the Seaboard Air Line, and the Pensacola and Atlantic Railroad. The connecting track survives.

According to the United States Census Bureau, Chattahoochee has a total area of 5.7 square miles (14.7 km^{2}), of which 5.5 square miles (14.2 km^{2}) is land and 0.2 square miles (0.5 km^{2}), or 3.30%, is water.

=== Climate ===
The climate for the City of Chattahoochee is characterized by hot, humid summers and generally mild to cool winters. According to the Köppen Climate Classification system, Chattahoochee has a humid subtropical climate zone, abbreviated "Cfa" on climate maps.

== Demographics ==
Historical population
Census	Pop.	Note	%±
1890	383		—
1930	5,624		—
1940	7,110		26.4%
1950	8,473		19.2%
1960	9,699		14.5%
1970	7,944		−18.1%
1980	5,332		−32.9%
1990	4,382		−17.8%
2000	3,287		−25.0%
2010	3,652		11.1%
2020	2,955		−19.1%
U.S. Decennial Census

=== Racial and ethnic composition ===
Chattahoochee city, Florida – Racial and ethnic composition Note: the US Census treats Hispanic/Latino as an ethnic category. This table excludes Latinos from the racial categories and assigns them to a separate category. Hispanics/Latinos may be of any race.
Race / Ethnicity (NH = Non-Hispanic)	Pop 2000	Pop 2010	Pop 2020	% 2000	% 2010	% 2020
White alone (NH)	1,613	1,557	1,208	49.07%	42.63%	40.88%
Black or African American alone (NH)	1,525	1,873	1,491	46.39%	51.29%	50.46%
Native American or Alaska Native alone (NH)	4	8	5	0.12%	0.22%	0.17%
Asian alone (NH)	31	38	22	0.94%	1.04%	0.74%
Native Hawaiian or Pacific Islander alone (NH)	1	0	2	0.03%	0.00%	0.07%
Other race alone (NH)	4	3	4	0.12%	0.08%	0.14%
Mixed race or Multiracial (NH)	25	38	80	0.76%	1.04%	2.71%
Hispanic or Latino (any race)	84	135	143	2.56%	3.70%	4.84%
Total	3,287	3,652	2,955	100.00%	100.00%	100.00%

=== 2020 census ===
As of the 2020 census, Chattahoochee had a population of 2,955. The median age was 44.1 years. 15.3% of residents were under the age of 18 and 18.4% of residents were 65 years of age or older. For every 100 females there were 124.4 males, and for every 100 females age 18 and over there were 125.0 males age 18 and over.

As of 2020, 0.0% of residents lived in urban areas, while 100.0% lived in rural areas.

In 2020, there were 845 households in Chattahoochee, of which 28.8% had children under the age of 18 living in them. Of all households, 32.0% were married-couple households, 21.8% were households with a male householder and no spouse or partner present, and 42.0% were households with a female householder and no spouse or partner present. About 31.9% of all households were made up of individuals and 15.6% had someone living alone who was 65 years of age or older.

In 2020, there were 1,069 housing units, of which 21.0% were vacant. The homeowner vacancy rate was 4.4% and the rental vacancy rate was 15.6%.

In 2020, the median household income was $40,000. 9.4% of the population over 25 years old had a Bachelor's degree or higher. There was an employment rate of 28.1%. 29.5% of the population lived without healthcare coverage.

=== 2010 census ===
As of the 2010 United States census, there were 3,652 people, 1,072 households, and 577 families residing in the city.

== Historic places ==
On January 6, 1861, 4 days before Florida delegates formally seceded from the Union as part of the American Civil War, state troops seized the federal arsenal located in the town. The former arsenal and current Administration Building of Florida State Hospital is listed on the National Register of Historic Places (Building - #73000578). Florida State Hospital, the hospital involved in the famous United States Supreme Court decision O'Connor v. Donaldson, is located within the City. The hospital was featured in a 1989 movie, Chattahoochee, starring Gary Oldman and Dennis Hopper, in which a war hero, Chris Calhoun, is involuntarily committed to Florida State Hospital where he sees doctors at the hospital humiliating patients and experiences filth and abuse.

== Government and infrastructure ==
The U.S. Postal Service operates the Chattahoochee Post Office.

The Chattahoochee Volunteer Fire Department operates one fire station.

Chattahoochee has its own police force with more than ten sworn officers and a police chief.

The Gadsden Connector, a bus route operated by Big Bend Transit, has a stop in Chattahoochee.

== Education ==
Gadsden County School District operates public schools.

The community is served by Chattahoochee Elementary School. In the fall of 2018, it will become a pre-K to kindergarten early learning center. Students in grades 1–3 will move to Greensboro Primary School and students in grades 4–5 will move to West Gadsden Middle School. The sole public high school of the county is Gadsden County High School (formerly East Gadsden High School).

Until 2004, Chattahoochee High School served as the community middle and high school. That year it consolidated into West Gadsden High School. As of 2017, East Gadsden became the only remaining zoned high school in the county due to the consolidation of West Gadsden High's high school section into East Gadsden High School.

== Notable people ==
- Roger Bailey, former MLB baseball pitcher for the Colorado Rockies
- Sandy D'Alemberte, former president of the American Bar Association and former president of Florida State University (FSU)
- Shanley Jackson, horse jockey

== In film ==
The 1989 film "Chattahoochee" is based on the Florida State Hospital and allegations of abuse on residents. The movie, which starred Gary Oldman and Dennis Hopper, was not shot in Chattahoochee, however.
