= Greensboro High School =

Defunct high school in Florida, United States

Coordinates: 30.5699°N 84.7361°W

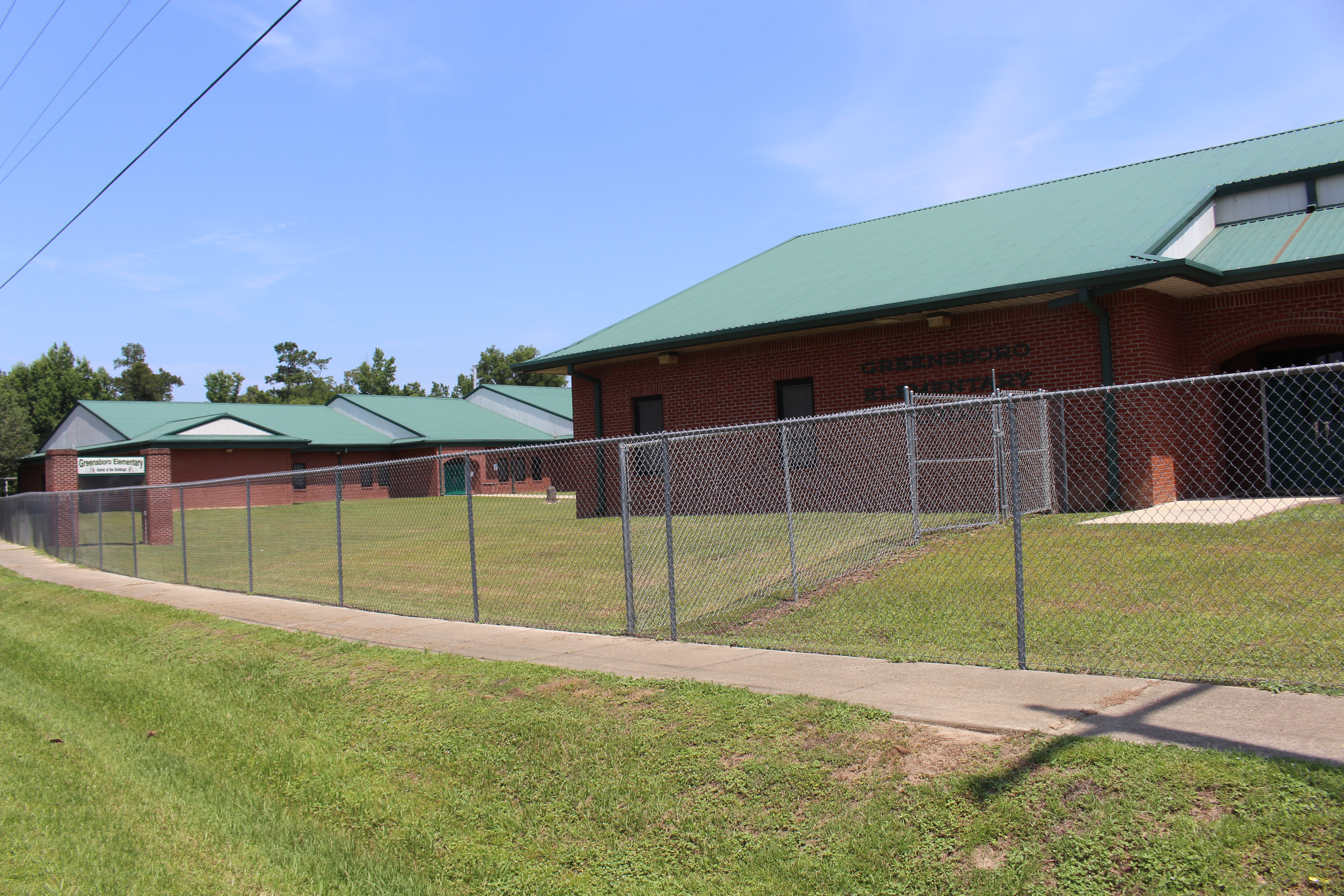
The Greensboro Elementary School site formerly housed Greensboro High School

Greensboro High School was a public high school in Greensboro, Florida. It was a part of Gadsden County Public Schools. West Gadsden High School, established in 2004, absorbed students who formerly attended Chattahoochee High School and Greensboro High School. The former Greensboro High campus was used for several years as the site of West Gadsden High; it now houses Greensboro Elementary School.

== Academics ==
In 2003 the school was ranked "D" under Florida's school ranking system.

== Desegregation ==
Brian Miller of the Tallahassee Democrat stated that the high school mergers damaged the school athletic spirit in the county as the former school identities were discarded.

According to Headley J. White, author of the 2006 PhD thesis "Effects of Desegregation on Gadsden County, Florida Public Schools 1968-1972," in post-desegregation Gadsden County, there was no stigma applied against white students who attended Greensboro High, while white students in other Gadsden County public schools experienced this stigma.
