= Chattahoochee High School (Florida) =

Defunct high school in Florida, United States

Coordinates: 30.6957°N 84.8391°W

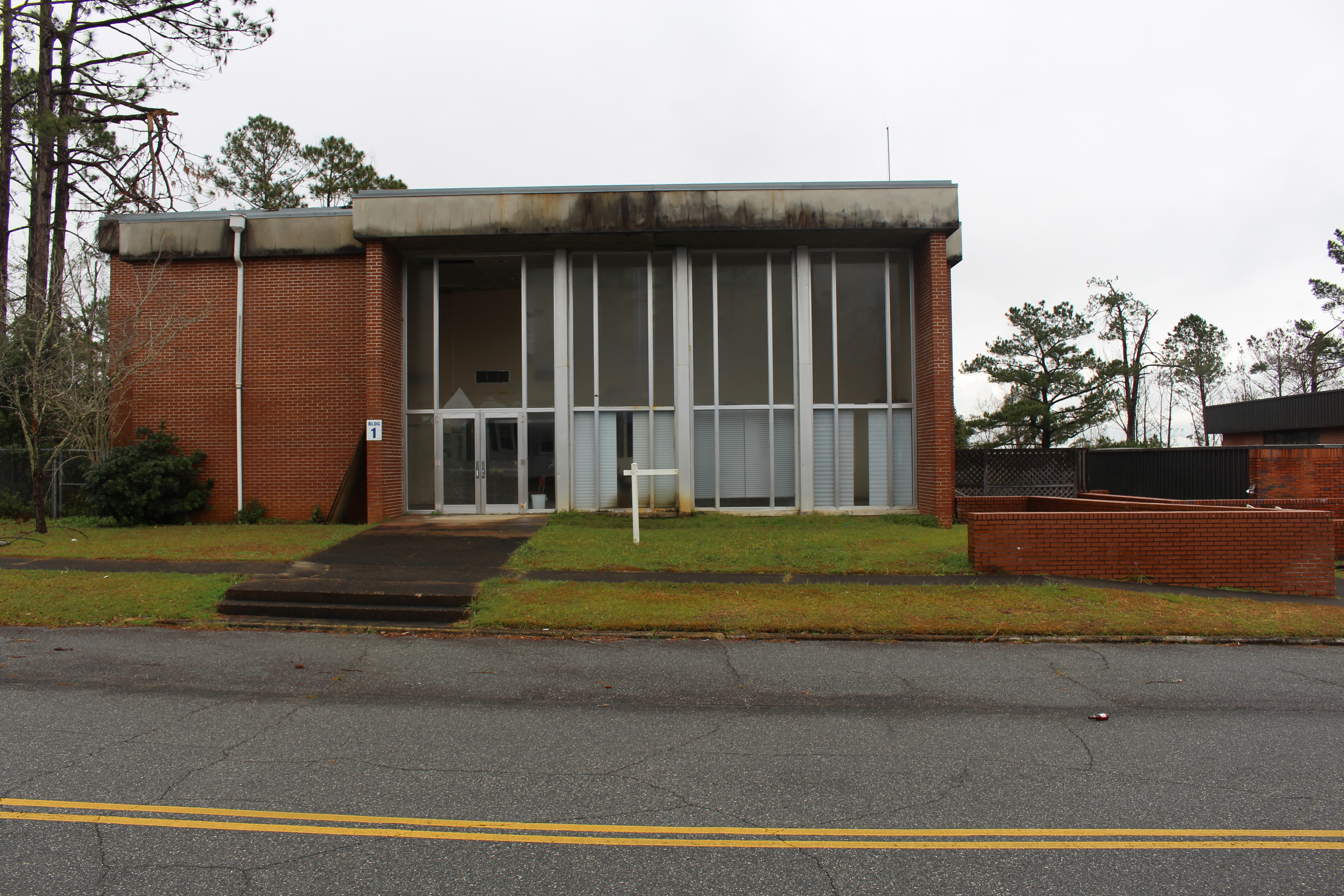
- Chattahoochee, Florida; United States

Information
- Other name: Chattahoochee High Magnet School
- Type: High school
- Closed: 2004
- School district: Gadsden County School District
- Enrollment: 228 (2003)

Chattahoochee High School (CHS) was a public middle and high school in Chattahoochee, Florida. It was a part of the Gadsden County Public Schools. In its final years it was also known as Chattahoochee High Magnet School (CHMS).

The school's student body became racially integrated in 1965. That year the school initially admitted black teachers only as physical education teachers, and asked them to keep white and black students separate.

According to Headley J. White, author of the 2006 PhD thesis "Effects of Desegregation on Gadsden County, Florida Public Schools 1968-1972," in post-desegregation Gadsden County, "to some extent" there was less stigma applied against white students who attended Chattahoochee High compared to those attending other public schools in Gadsden County.

In 2003 the school, which was "C"-ranked in Florida's school evaluation system, had 228 students. The school board decided it was too small to give a proper course offering to its students. West Gadsden High School, established in 2004, absorbed students who formerly attended Chattahoochee High School and Greensboro High School. Brian Miller of the Tallahassee Democrat stated that the high school mergers damaged the school athletic spirit in the county as the former school identities were discarded.
