= Midway, Gadsden County, Florida =

Midway, Florida
- City
- City of Midway
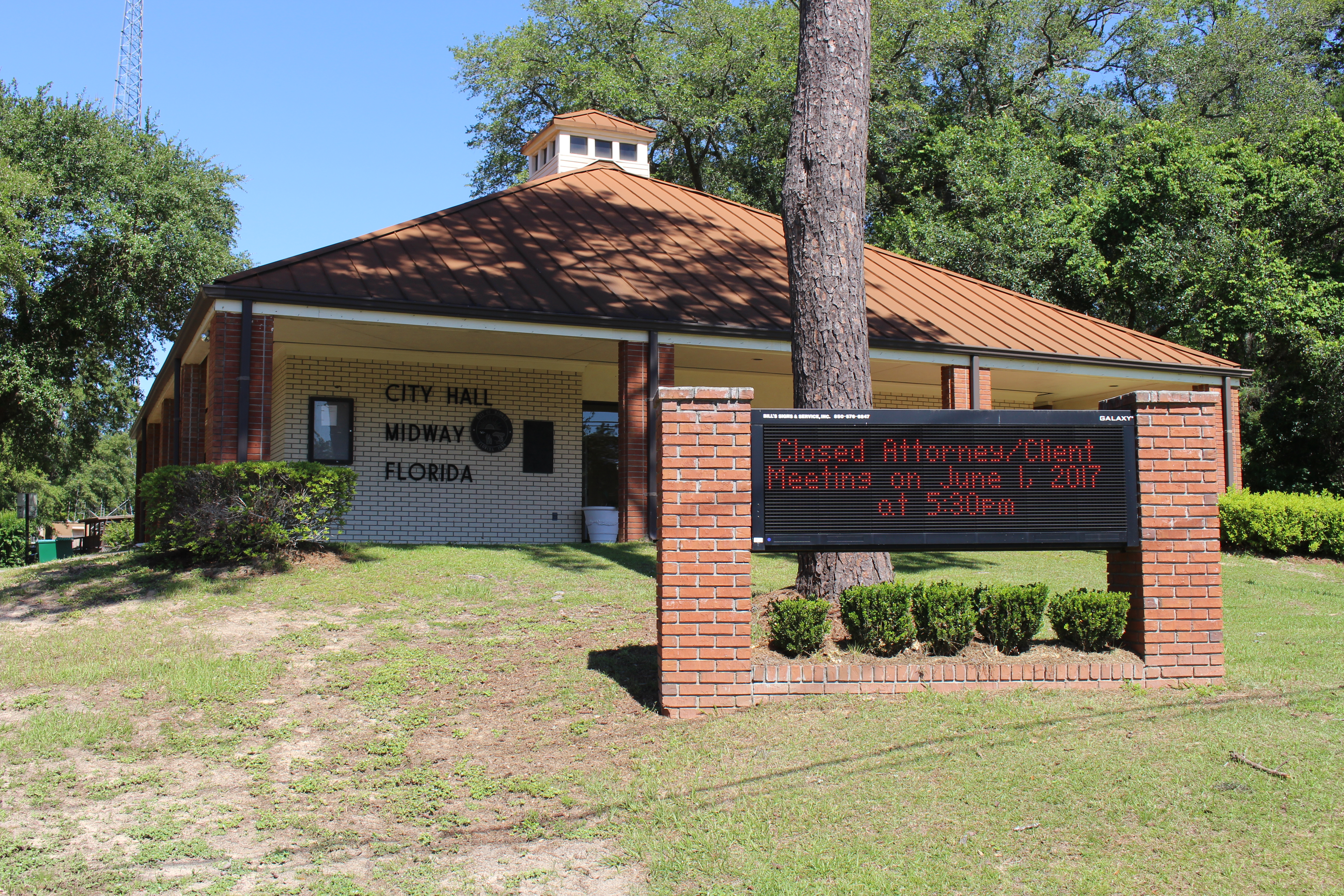
- Midway City Hall
- Motto(s): "A City of Progress & Possibilities"
- Location in Gadsden County and the state of Florida
- Country: United States
- State: Florida
- Counties: Gadsden
- Settled (Salubrity): c. 1800s
- Unincorporated (Midway): c. 1900s
- Incorporated (City of Midway): 1986

Government
  - Type: Council-manager
  - Mayor: Ella Parker Dickey
  - Mayor Pro Tem: NanDrycka King Albert
  - Council members: Braheem Russ, Valarie Ford, and Charles Williams
  - City Manager: Dr. Henry Grant
  - City Clerk: Frances Harrell

Area
  - Total: 9.70 sq mi (25.12 km^{2})
  - Land: 9.61 sq mi (24.90 km^{2})
  - Water: 0.085 sq mi (0.22 km^{2})
- Elevation: 200 ft (61 m)

Population (2020)
  - Total: 3,537
  - Density: 367.9/sq mi (142.03/km^{2})
- ZIP Code: 32343
- Area code(s): 850, 448
- FIPS code: 12-45425
- GNIS feature ID: 0306037
- Website: www.mymidwayfl.com

Midway is a city in Gadsden County, Florida, United States. It is a part of the Tallahassee, Florida Metropolitan Statistical Area. At the 2020 census, the population was 3,537, up from 3,004 at the 2010 census.

== History ==
Midway has a long history going back to the early days of Florida, such as contact by Spanish explorer conquistadors, wars against Native Americans by colonizers (like the Seminole Wars), and slavery. It's speculated that the name "Midway" was chosen because its location is midway between Pensacola and Jacksonville or between Quincy and Tallahassee. But in the 1800s, the community was actually called Salubrity. The Old Spanish Trail still goes through the city.

In 1835, Robert Meacham, a African Methodist Episcopal Church minister and Jefferson County circuit court clerk, won the seat for the Florida State Senate, becoming a state senator during the Reconstruction Era, (and afterwards a postmaster in Punta Gorda,) had parents from Salubrity who educated him at home. His mother was an enslaved African American woman and his dad was a white American father who was a doctor and slaver.

A normal school under the supervision of W.D. Scull was reportedly being established in Midway in 1867. The Florida Archives have a 1930 photograph of Florida Fuller Earth's mine in Midway. By the 1900s, the community became known as Midway. In 1986, the City of Midway was officially incorporated as a municipality by the special act of the Florida Legislature.

== Geography ==
Midway is located in eastern Gadsden County at 30°29′42″N 84°27′45″W. The city limits extend from the Little River in the west to the Ochlockonee River in the east. The Ochlockonee forms the Gadsden County–Leon County border.

The city is located along Interstate 10 (I-10), with access from Exit 192 (US-90). I-10 leads east 12 miles (19 km) to Tallahassee and west 52 miles (84 km) to Marianna. US 90 leads northwest 11 miles (18 km) to Quincy, the Gadsden County seat, and east 12 miles into Tallahassee. Also as per its name, it is close to the halfway point of both I-10 and US-90 with I-10 being 362.057 miles across, Midway (the city) is 191.949 miles, while the real midpoint is 181.0285 miles, US-90 is 408.723 miles across, Midway is 210.790 miles, the midpoint is 204.3615 miles According to the United States Census Bureau, Midway has a total area of 9.2 square miles (23.9 km^{2}), of which 0.04 square miles (0.1 km^{2}), or 0.35%, is water. The Old Spanish Trail also goes through the city.

== Demographics ==
Historical population
Census	Pop.	Note	%±
1990	852		—
2000	1,446		69.7%
2010	3,004		107.7%
2020	3,537		17.7%
U.S. Decennial Census

=== 2020 census ===
Midway city, Gadsden County, Florida – Racial and ethnic composition Note: the US Census treats Hispanic/Latino as an ethnic category. This table excludes Latinos from the racial categories and assigns them to a separate category. Hispanics/Latinos may be of any race.
Race / Ethnicity (NH = Non-Hispanic)	Pop 2000	Pop 2010	Pop 2020	% 2000	% 2010	% 2020
White alone (NH)	63	255	168	4.36%	8.49%	4.75%
Black or African American alone (NH)	1,361	2,577	3,062	94.12%	85.79%	86.57%
Native American or Alaska Native alone (NH)	0	7	1	0.00%	0.23%	0.03%
Asian alone (NH)	2	25	18	0.14%	0.83%	0.51%
Native Hawaiian or Pacific Islander alone (NH)	1	0	0	0.07%	0.00%	0.00%
Other race (NH)	0	1	32	0.00%	0.03%	0.90%
Mixed race or Multiracial (NH)	7	25	57	0.48%	0.83%	1.61%
Hispanic or Latino (any race)	12	114	199	0.83%	3.79%	5.63%
Total	1,446	3,004	3,537	100.00%	100.00%	100.00%

As of the 2020 United States census, there were 3,537 people, 1,131 households, and 818 families residing in the city.

As of the 2010 United States census, there were 3,004 people, 995 households, and 624 families residing in the city.

In 2010, there were 1,204 households, out of which 39.6% had children under the age of 18 living with them, 39.8% were married couples living together, 27.1% had a female householder with no husband present, and 26.6% were non-families. 28.5% of all households were made up of individuals, and 3.1% had someone living alone who was 65 years of age or older. The average household size was 2.79 and the average family size was 3.25.

=== 2000 census ===
As of the census of 2000, there were 1,446 people, 481 households, and 368 families residing in the city. The population density was 377.1 inhabitants per square mile (145.6/km^{2}). There are 559 housing units at an average density of 56.4/km² (145.8/mi²). The racial makeup of the city is 4.63% White, 94.40% African American, 0.00% Native American, 0.14% Asian, 0.07% Pacific Islander, 0.21% from other races, and 0.55% from two or more races. 0.83% of the population were Hispanic or Latino of any race.

In 2000, there were 481 households out of which 40.3% have children under the age of 18 living with them, 37.6% were married couples living together, 33.5% have a female householder with no husband present, and 23.3% were non-families. 20.6% of all households were made up of individuals and 4.0% have someone living alone who is 65 years of age or older. The average household size is 3.01 and the average family size is 3.47.

In 2000, in the city, the population was spread out, with 33.4% under the age of 18, 11.3% from 18 to 24, 26.6% from 25 to 44, 20.4% from 45 to 64, and 8.3% who were 65 years of age or older. The median age was 29 years. For every 100 females, there were 83.7 males. For every 100 females age 18 and over, there were 81.7 males.

In 2000, the median income for a household in the city was $24,875, and the median income for a family was $26,389. Males had a median income of $21,650 versus $17,500 for females. The per capita income for the city was $11,287. About 26.2% of families and 31.3% of the population were below the poverty line, including 39.7% of those under age 18 and 28.2% of those age 65 or over.

== Government and infrastructure ==
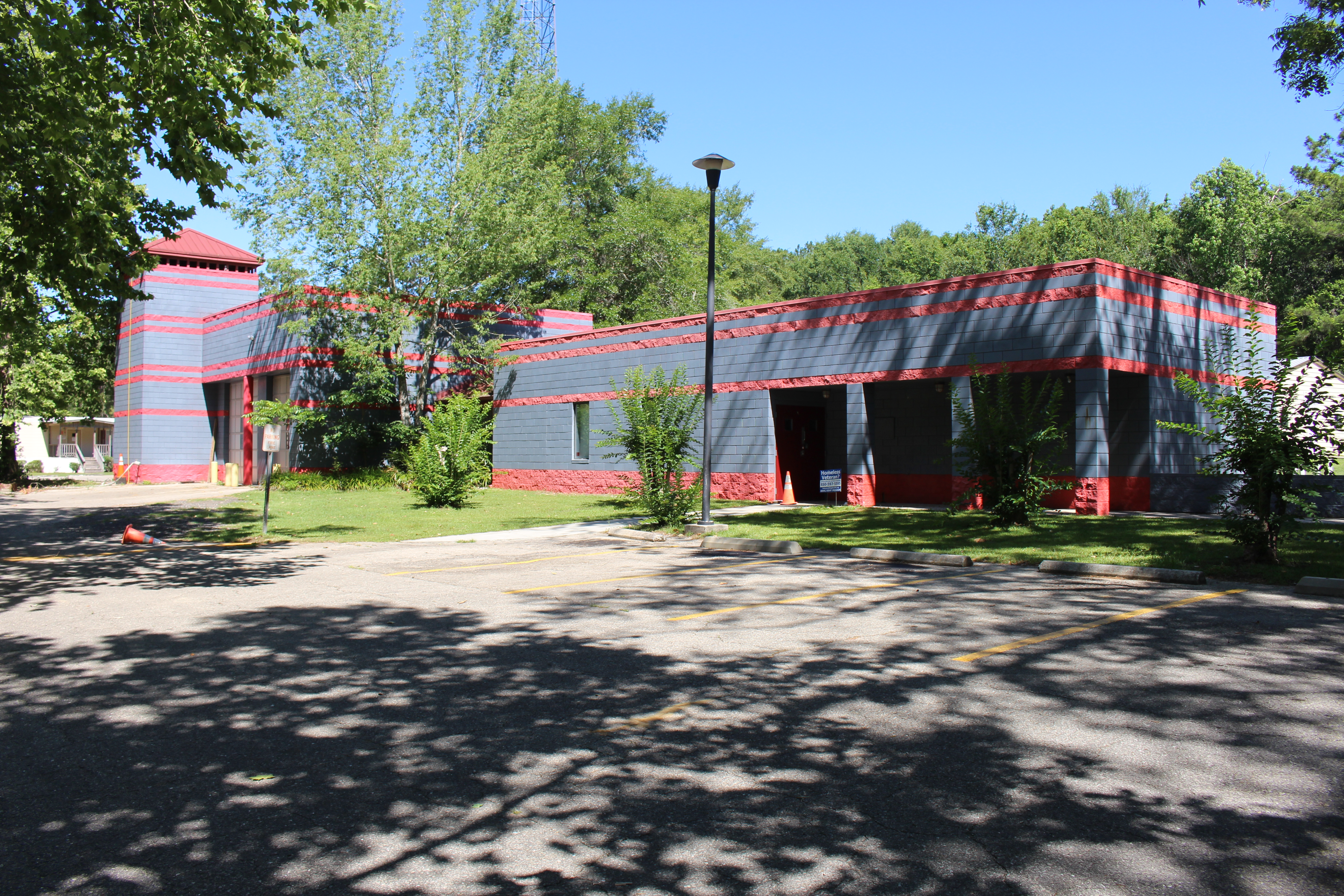
Midway Volunteer Fire Station

The Midway Post Office of the U.S. Postal Service serves the community. Midway Volunteer Fire Department operates a station in Midway. The Gadsden Express, a bus route operated by Big Bend Transit, has a stop in Midway.

== Education ==
Gadsden County School District operates public schools serving Midway. As of 2017 Gadsden County High School (formerly East Gadsden High School) is the only remaining zoned high school in the county due to the consolidation of West Gadsden High School's high school section into East Gadsden High. From 2003 until 2017 East Gadsden High served as the high school of Midway.

Previously the district operated Midway Magnet School, an early childhood center constructed on land donated by Pat McLain, who once served as the mayor of Midway. The district had planned to make it into an elementary school.
