= Gadsden County School District =

School district in Florida, United States

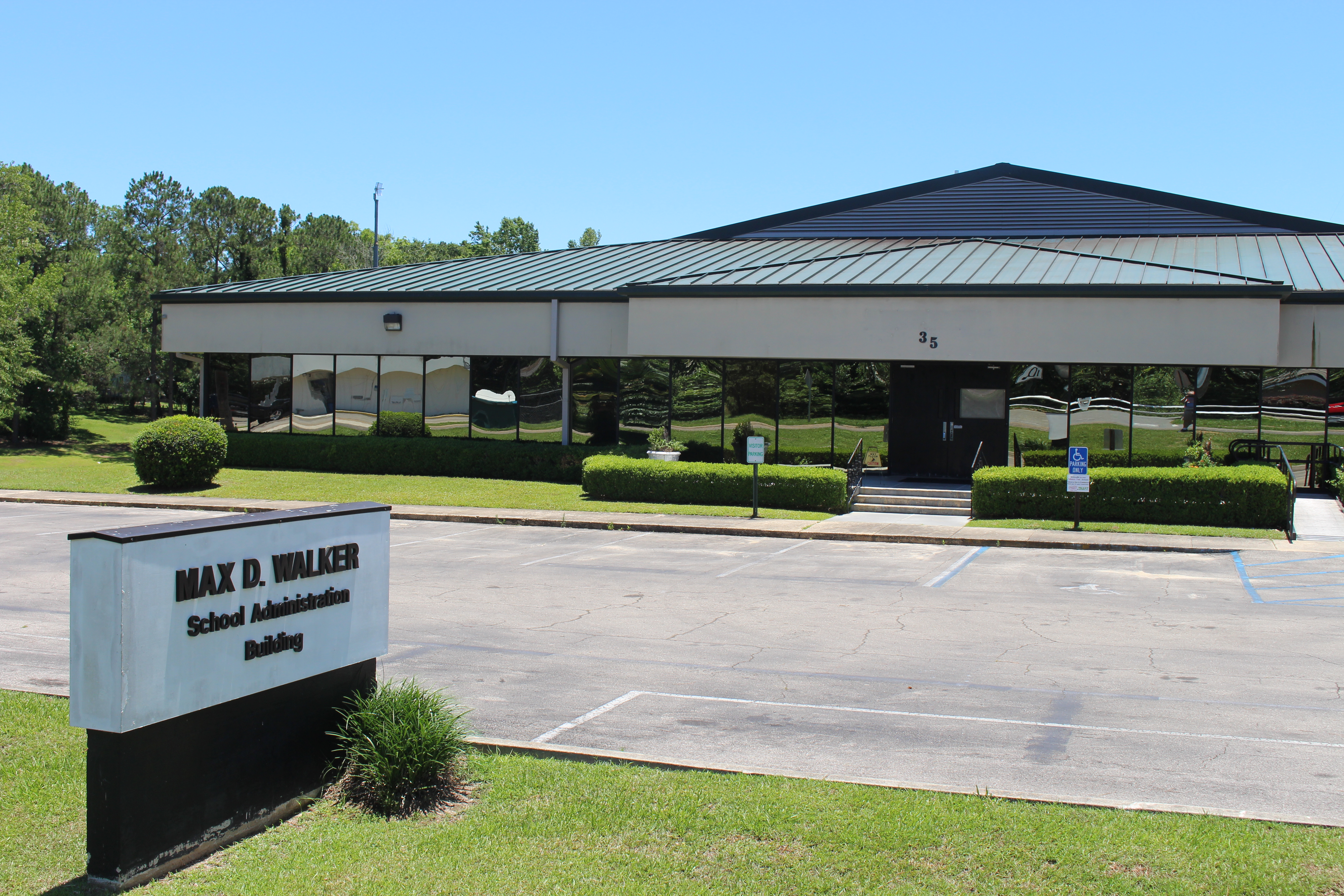
- Max D. Walker School Administration Building, the district headquarters

Address
- 35 Martin Luther King Jr. Boulevard Quincy, Florida, 32351; United States

District information
- Type: Public
- Grades: PreK–12
- NCES District ID: 1200600

Students and staff
- Students: 4,924
- Teachers: 340.94
- Staff: 503.29
- Student–teacher ratio: 14.44

Other information
- Website: www.gadsdenschools.org

Gadsden County School District (GCPS), or Gadsden County Schools (GCS), or Gadsden County Public Schools (GCPS), is a school district headquartered in the Max D. Walker School Administration Building in Quincy, Florida. It serves Gadsden County as its sole school district.

== History ==
Several area private schools served county students before the formation of the school district, which occurred during a meeting in the county sheriff's office on September 18, 1869. The district initially enrolled about 2,500 students. Throughout much of its history, it relied on Rosenwald schools. Many of its contemporary school buildings opened in the 1960s.

Prior to 1970, the school district had autonomous community schools and racial segregation; at that time all schools were integrated and the district was unified, with centrally located schools. After 1970 the white student population declined, with some students going to the Robert F. Munroe Day School and the Tallavanna Christian School. According to Headley J. White, author of the 2006 PhD thesis "Effects of Desegregation on Gadsden County, Florida Public Schools 1968-1972," in post-desegregation Gadsden County, white students attending most Gadsden County public schools experienced stigma. Many black students no longer worked on tobacco fields, causing the tobacco industry in the county to suffer and therefore damaging its economy and causing Gadsden County's population to decline.

By 1999 the majority of white students were in private schools. In 1999 a Florida Trend article written by Cynthia Barnett described the county public schools as representing "everything wrong with the state's public schools: High rates of illiteracy, delinquency, drop-outs and teen pregnancy."

Circa 2002 the school district had almost 10,000 students. In 2017 the school district had 5,400 students.

== Schools ==
High schools:

- Gadsden County High School (formerly East Gadsden High School) - Unincorporated area
  - Note: In fall 2017 grades 9-12 from East Gadsden High School and West Gadsden High School consolidated to East Gadsden High and West Gadsden High became a 5-8 middle school

PK-8 schools:

- Gadsden Elementary Magnet School - Quincy
- Havana Magnet School - Havana

Middle schools:

- James A. Shanks Middle School - Quincy
- West Gadsden Middle School - Unincorporated area

Elementary schools:

- Chattahoochee Elementary School - Chattahoochee
  - It will become a Pre-Kindergarten and Kindergarten early learning center in 2018.
- Greensboro Elementary School - Greensboro
  - Previously it served grades PK-5. In fall 2017 it became a PK-3 elementary school.
- George W. Munroe Elementary School - Quincy
  - It will become a PreK-3 school
- Stewart Street Elementary School - Quincy

Alternative:

- Carter-Parramore Academy (K-12) - Quincy
- Crossroad Academy Charter School (K-12) - Quincy
- Gadsden Central Academy (high school) - Quincy
- Hope Academy (high school) - Quincy

=== Former schools ===
High schools:

- Chattahoochee High School - Also known as Chattahoochee Magnet High School
- Greensboro High School
- Havana Northside High School
- James A. Shanks High School

Middle schools:

- Carter Parramore Middle School - Quincy
- Havana Middle School

Elementary schools:

- Gretna Elementary School - Gretna
  - It was scheduled to close in 2018. - It ultimately closed in July 2017
- Havana Elementary School
- St. John Elementary School - Unincorporated area
  - It closed in July 2017

Early childhood:

- Midway Magnet School

== Gallery ==
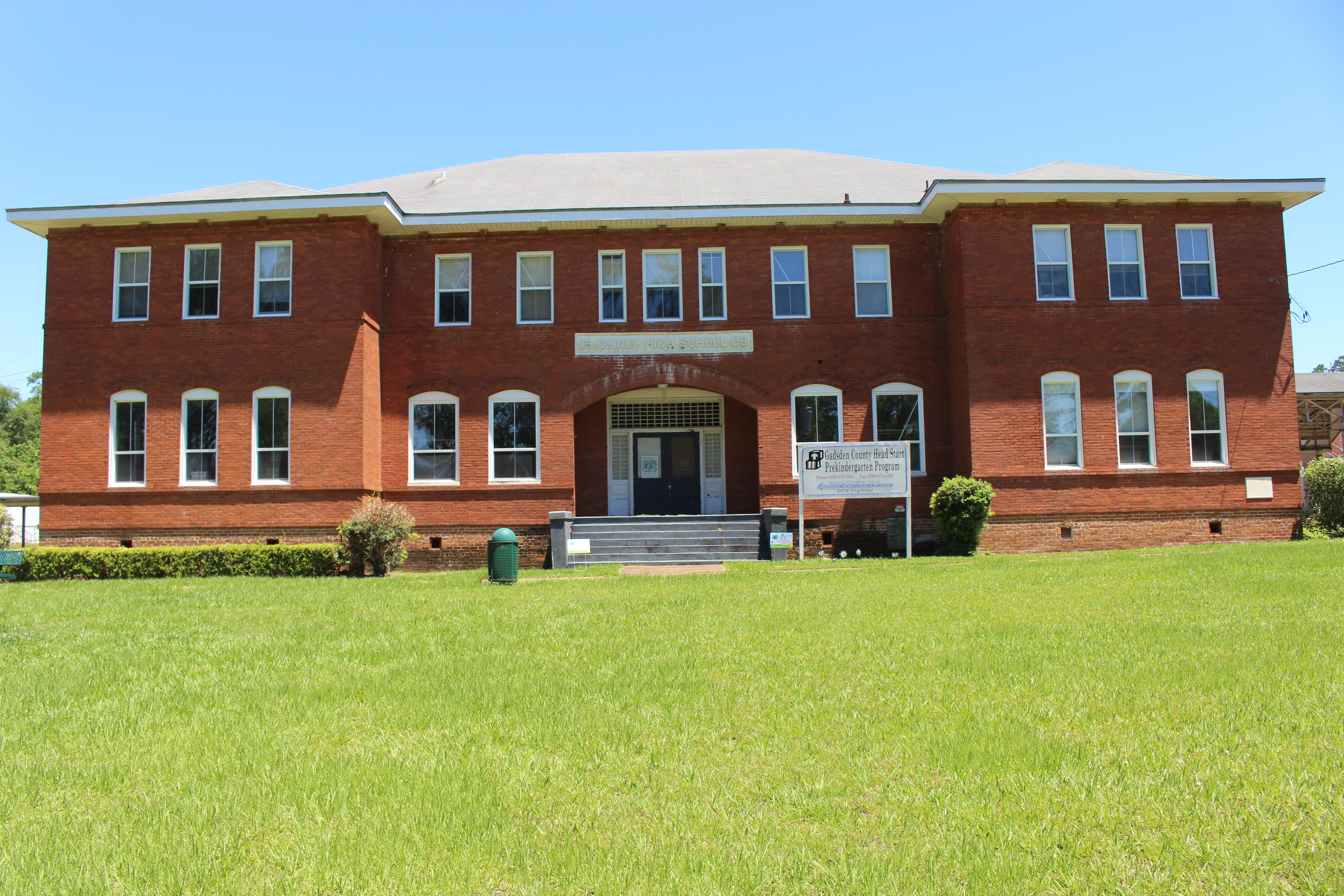
Gadsden County Head Start (formerly Quincy High School)

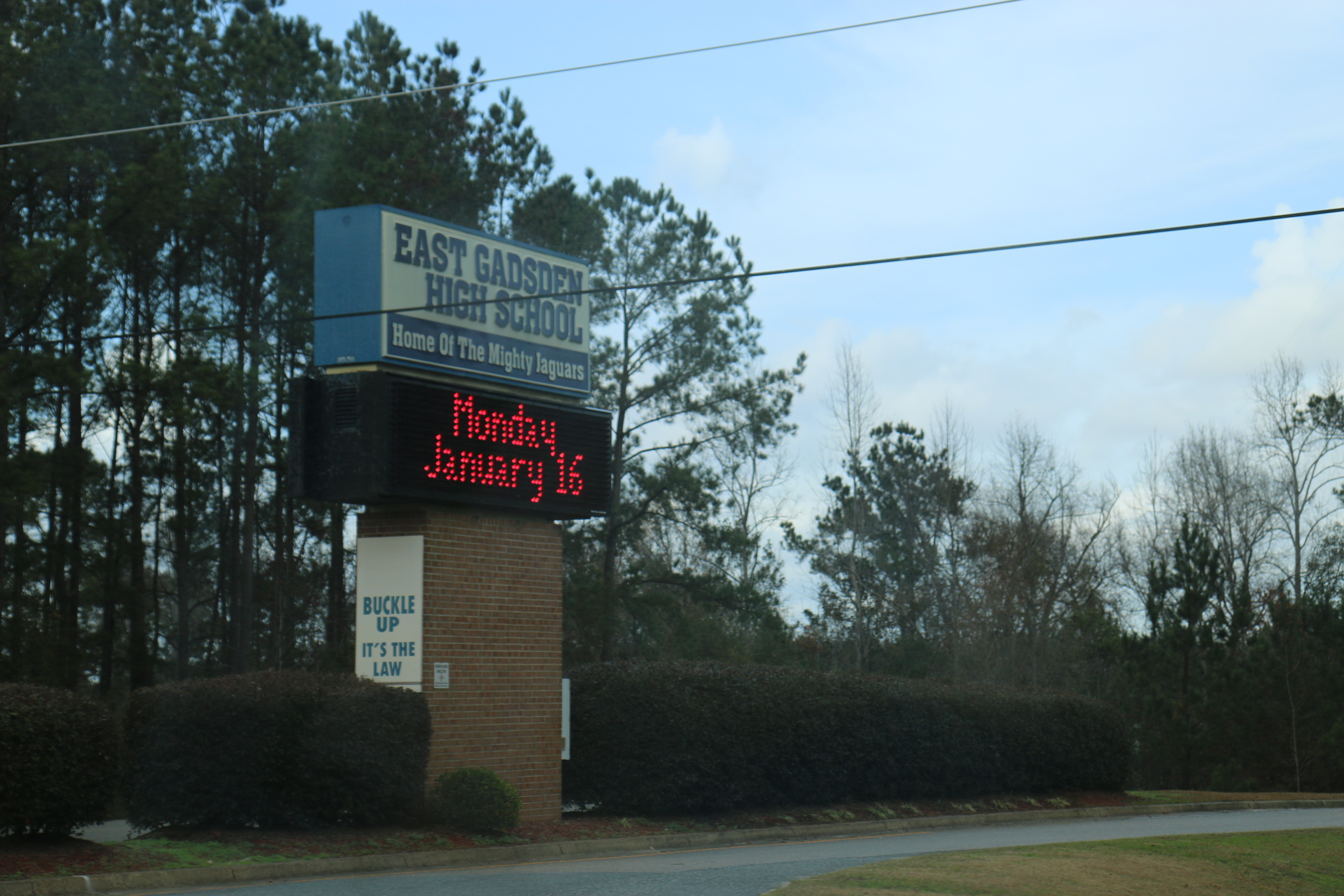
East Gadsden High School

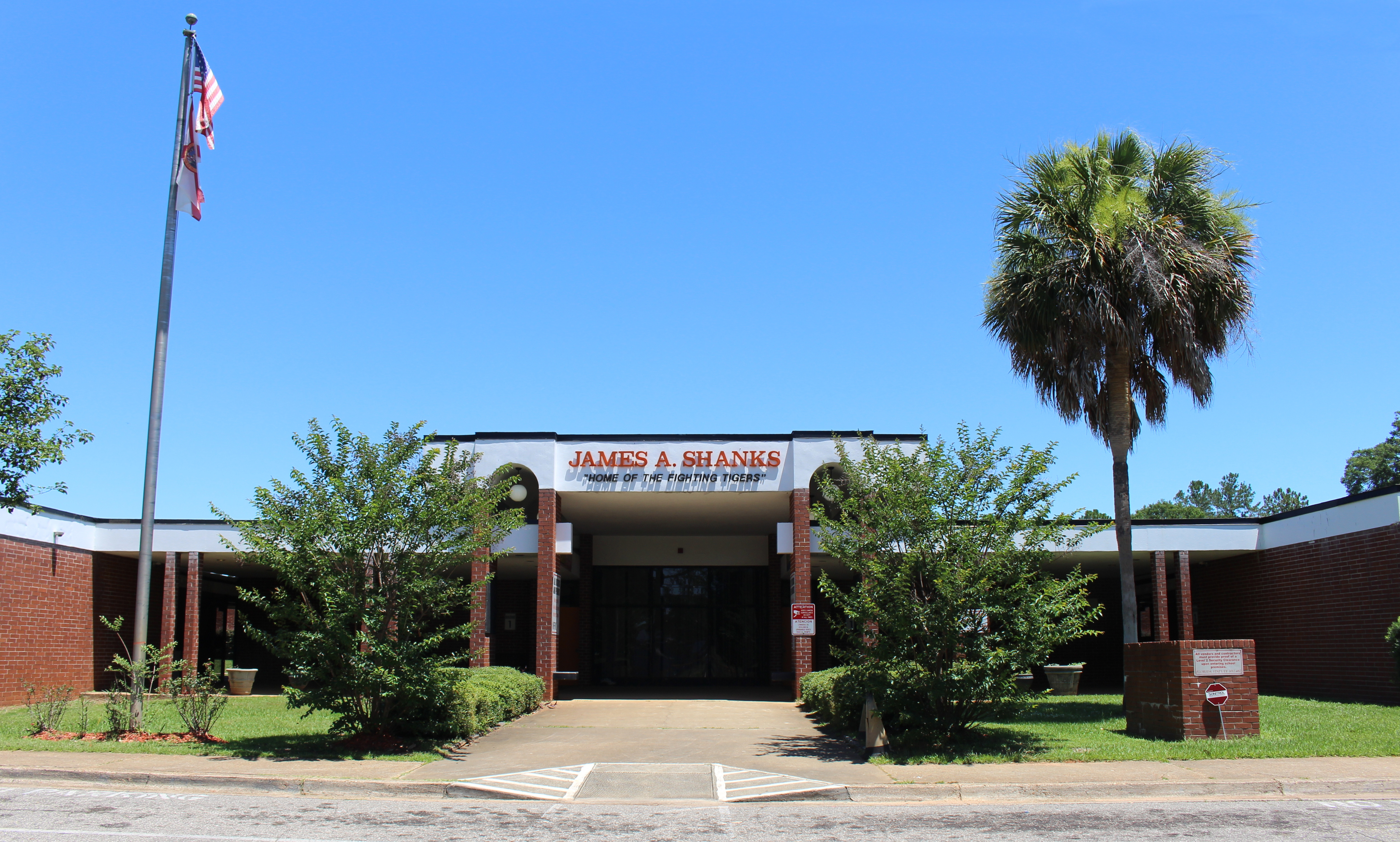
James A. Shanks Middle School

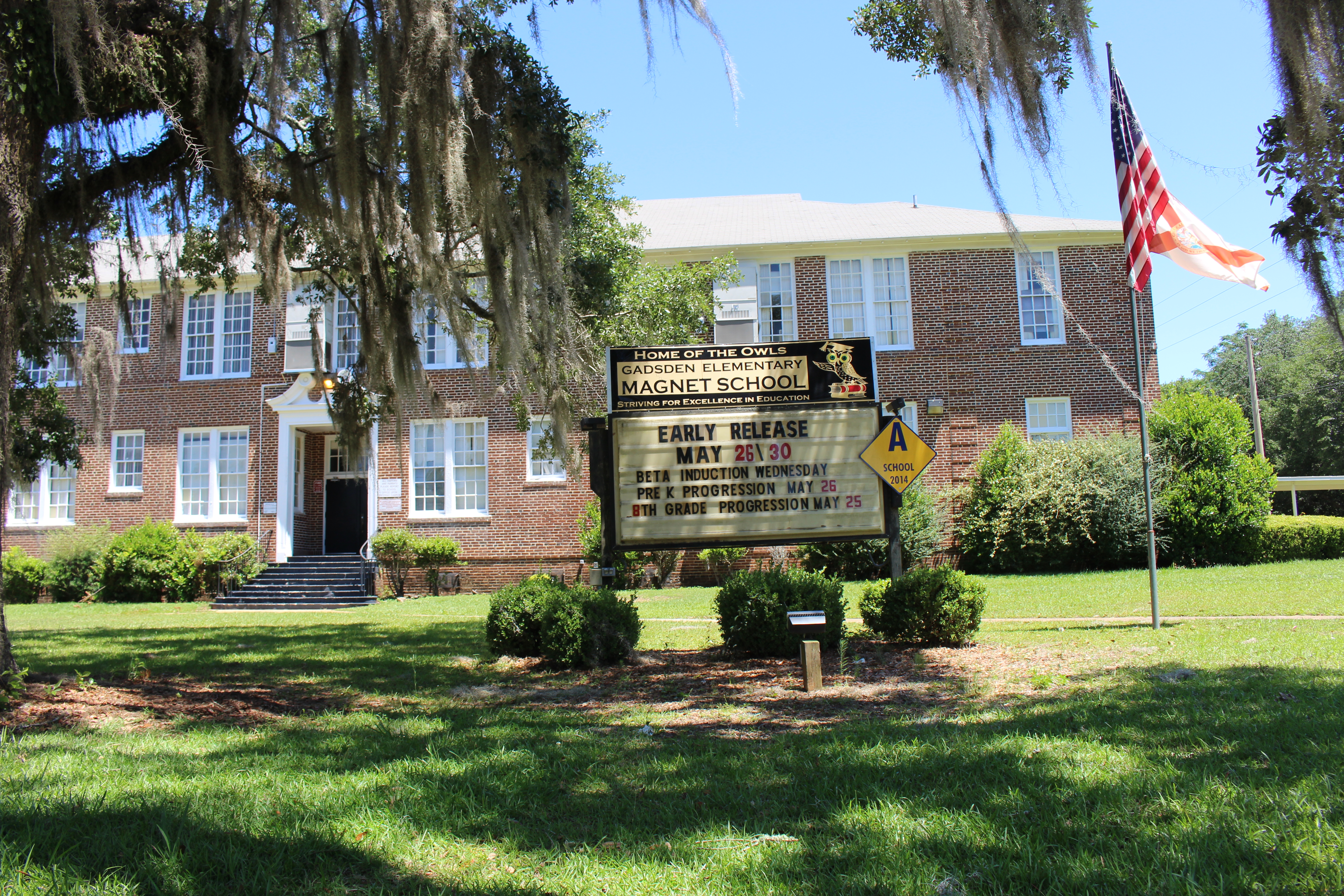
Gadsden Magnet Elementary School (former Quincy High School)

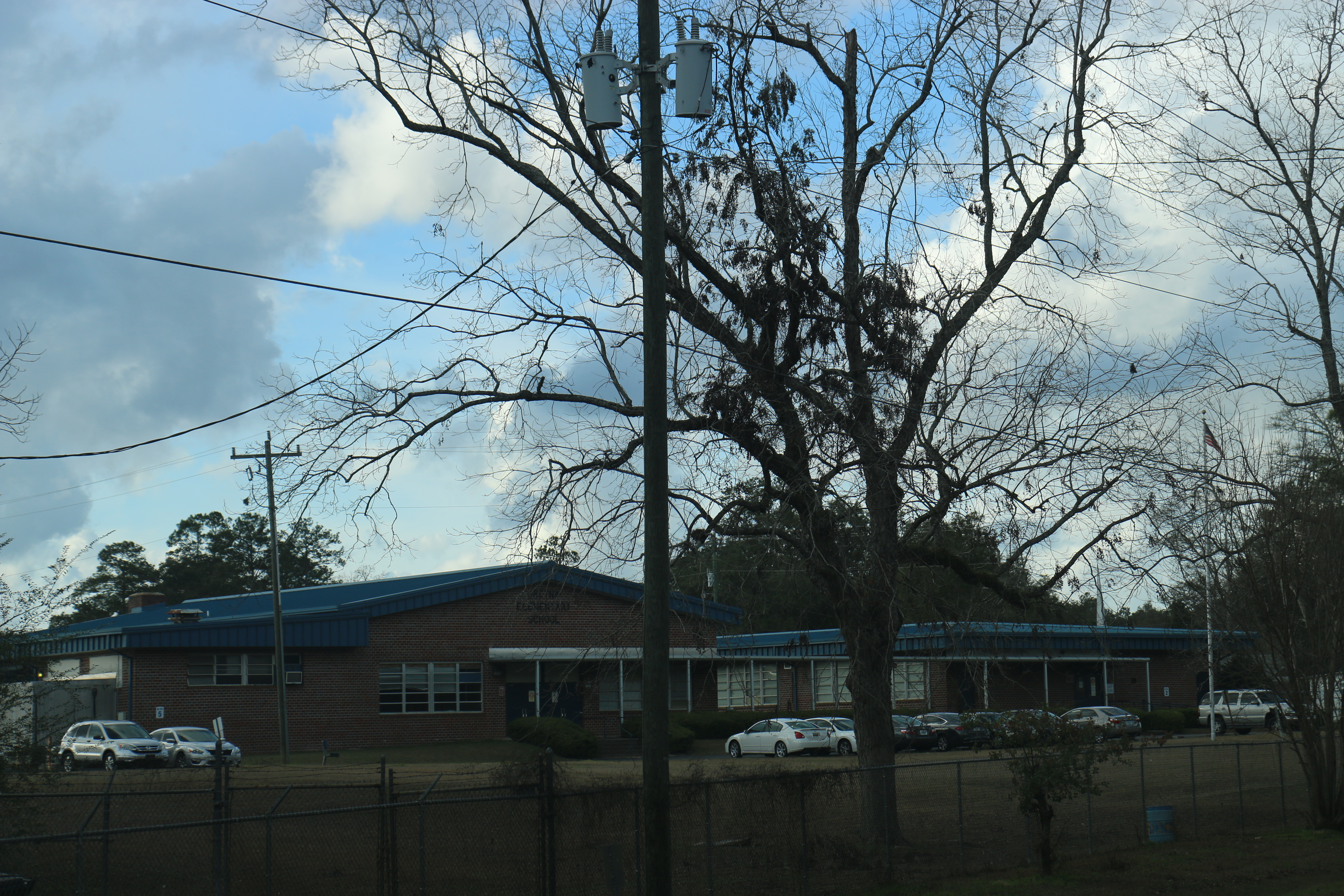
Gretna Elementary School

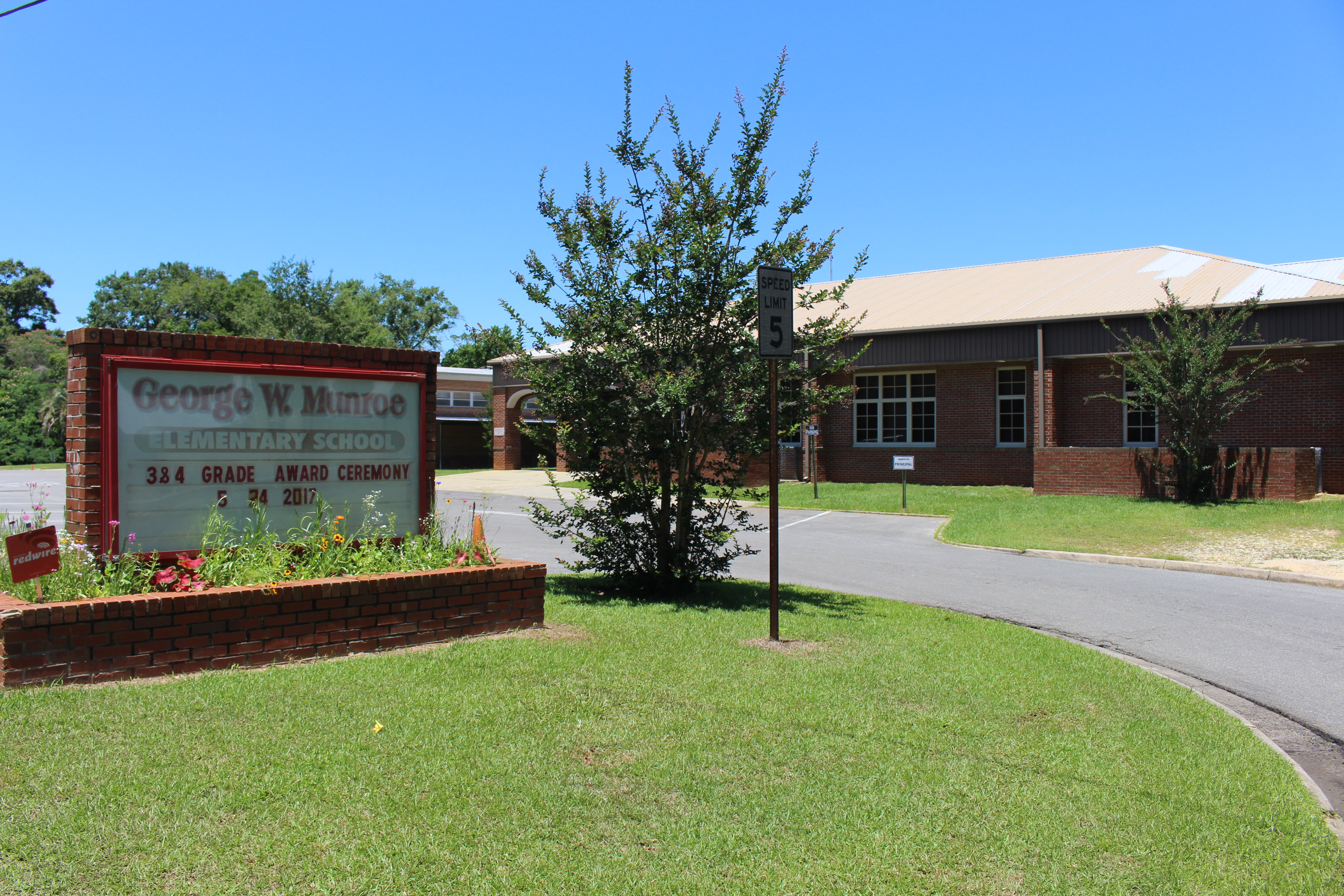
George W. Munroe Elementary School
