= Greensboro, Florida =

Town in the state of Florida, United States

- Town
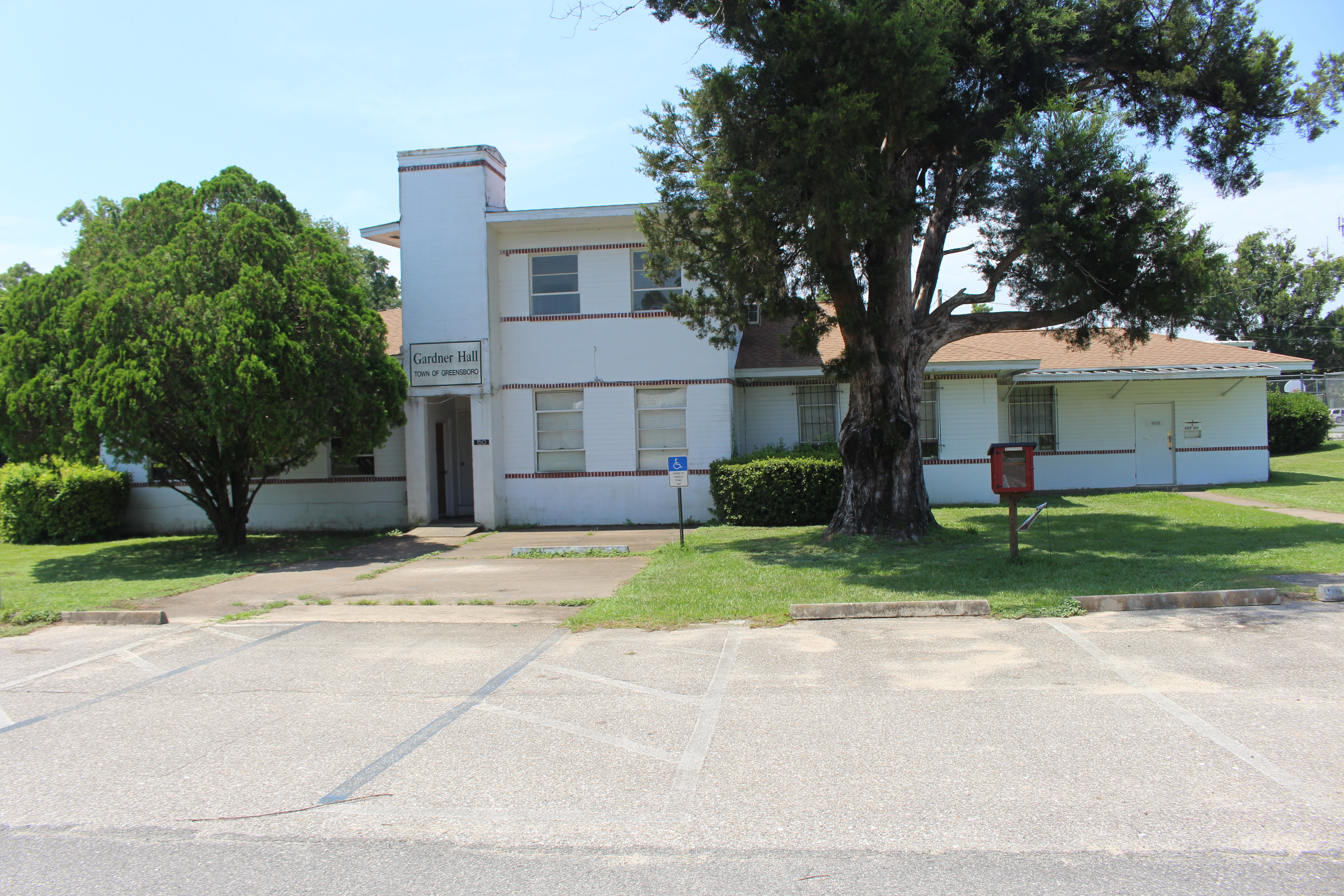
- Greensboro Town Hall
- Motto: "Welcome Home"
- Location in Gadsden County and the state of Florida
- Interactive map of Greensboro, Florida
- Coordinates: 30°34′15″N 84°44′40″W
- Country: United States
- State: Florida
- County: Gadsden
- Settled (Green's): 1895
- Platted (Green's): 1907
- Incorporated (Town of Greensboro): 1911

Government
  - Type: Mayor-Council
  - Mayor: Lamar Alday
  - Council President: Kimberly "Kim" A. Boyer
  - Councilmembers: Justin Alday, Brenda K. Martinez, Tamika Thurman, and Jacquelyn "Jackie" R. Barber
  - Town Manager: Michael "Mike" Wade
  - Town Clerk: Tere Strickland

Area
  - Total: 2.31 sq mi (5.97 km^{2})
  - Land: 2.30 sq mi (5.95 km^{2})
  - Water: 0.0077 sq mi (0.02 km^{2})
- Elevation: 269 ft (82 m)

Population (2020)
  - Total: 461
  - Density: 200.7/sq mi (77.48/km^{2})
- Time zone: UTC-5 (Eastern (EST))
  - Summer (DST): UTC-4 (EDT)
- ZIP code: 32330
- Area code(s): 850, 448
- FIPS code: 12-27550
- GNIS feature ID: 2406614
- Website: www.greensborofl.com

Greensboro is a town in Gadsden County, Florida, United States. It is part of the Tallahassee Metropolitan Statistical Area. The population was 461 at the 2020 census, down from 602 at the 2010 census.

== History ==
In 1895, J.W. Green bought 160 acres (64.7497 hectares) in Gadsden County. He built a house and farm, as well as a post office that he named after his land, "Green's". In 1907, the Apalachicola Northern Railroad built their train depot on his farmland, which made him decide to plat his land and transform it into a town. In 1911, the "Town of Greensboro" was officially incorporated as municipality, in honor of Green.

== Geography ==
The Town of Greensboro is located in western Gadsden County. It is bordered to the northeast by the city of Gretna. Florida State Road 12 passes through the town center, leading east 10 miles (16 km) to Quincy, the county seat, and southwest 18 miles (29 km) to Bristol. Interstate 10 (Exit 174) is 3 miles (5 km) east of the center of town via SR 12; I-10 leads east 29 miles (47 km) to Tallahassee, the state capital.

According to the United States Census Bureau, Greensboro has a total area of 1.0 square mile (2.6 km^{2}), all land.

== Climate ==
The climate in this area is characterized by hot, humid summers and generally mild winters. According to the Köppen climate classification, the Town of Greensboro has a humid subtropical climate zone (Cfa).

== Demographics ==
Historical population
Census	Pop.	Note	%±
1910	175		—
1920	302		72.6%
1930	350		15.9%
1940	443		26.6%
1950	565		27.5%
1960	709		25.5%
1970	716		1.0%
1980	562		−21.5%
1990	586		4.3%
2000	619		5.6%
2010	602		−2.7%
2020	461		−23.4%
U.S. Decennial Census

=== 2010 and 2020 census ===
Greensboro racial composition (Hispanics excluded from racial categories) (NH = Non-Hispanic)
Race	Pop 2010	Pop 2020	% 2010	% 2020
White (NH)	136	112	22.59%	24.30%
Black or African American (NH)	163	124	27.08%	26.90%
Native American or Alaska Native (NH)	0	0	0.00%	0.00%
Asian (NH)	0	8	0.00%	1.74%
Pacific Islander or Native Hawaiian (NH)	0	0	0.00%	0.00%
Some other race (NH)	3	0	0.50%	0.00%
Two or more races/Multiracial (NH)	3	4	0.50%	0.87%
Hispanic or Latino (any race)	297	213	49.34%	46.20%
Total	602	461		

As of the 2020 United States census, there were 461 people, 252 households, and 230 families residing in the town.

As of the 2010 United States census, there were 602 people, 267 households, and 159 families residing in the town.

=== 2000 census ===
As of the census of 2000, there were 619 people, 207 households, and 150 families residing in the town. The population density was 612.6 inhabitants per square mile (236.5/km^{2}). There were 230 housing units at an average density of 227.6 per square mile (87.9/km^{2}). The racial makeup of the town was 50.24% White, 32.47% African American, 1.13% Asian, 15.83% from other races, and 0.32% from two or more races. Hispanic or Latino of any race were 37.80% of the population.

In 2000, there were 207 households, out of which 37.7% had children under the age of 18 living with them, 48.3% were married couples living together, 16.9% had a female householder with no husband present, and 27.1% were non-families. 21.3% of all households were made up of individuals, and 12.6% had someone living alone who was 65 years of age or older. The average household size was 2.99 and the average family size was 3.41.

In 2000, in the town, the population was spread out, with 31.0% under the age of 18, 12.8% from 18 to 24, 28.1% from 25 to 44, 17.8% from 45 to 64, and 10.3% who were 65 years of age or older. The median age was 30 years. For every 100 females, there were 97.8 males. For every 100 females age 18 and over, there were 97.7 males.

In 2000, the median income for a household in the town was $31,458, and the median income for a family was $35,000. Males had a median income of $17,308 versus $17,708 for females. The per capita income for the town was $11,825. About 15.3% of families and 24.3% of the population were below the poverty line, including 36.2% of those under age 18 and 9.9% of those age 65 or over.

== Government and infrastructure ==
The U.S. Postal Service operates the Greensboro Post Office.

The Greensboro Volunteer Fire Department operates one fire station, located at the Earl Willis Community Center.

The Gadsden Connector, a bus route operated by Big Bend Transit, has a stop in Greensboro.

== Education ==
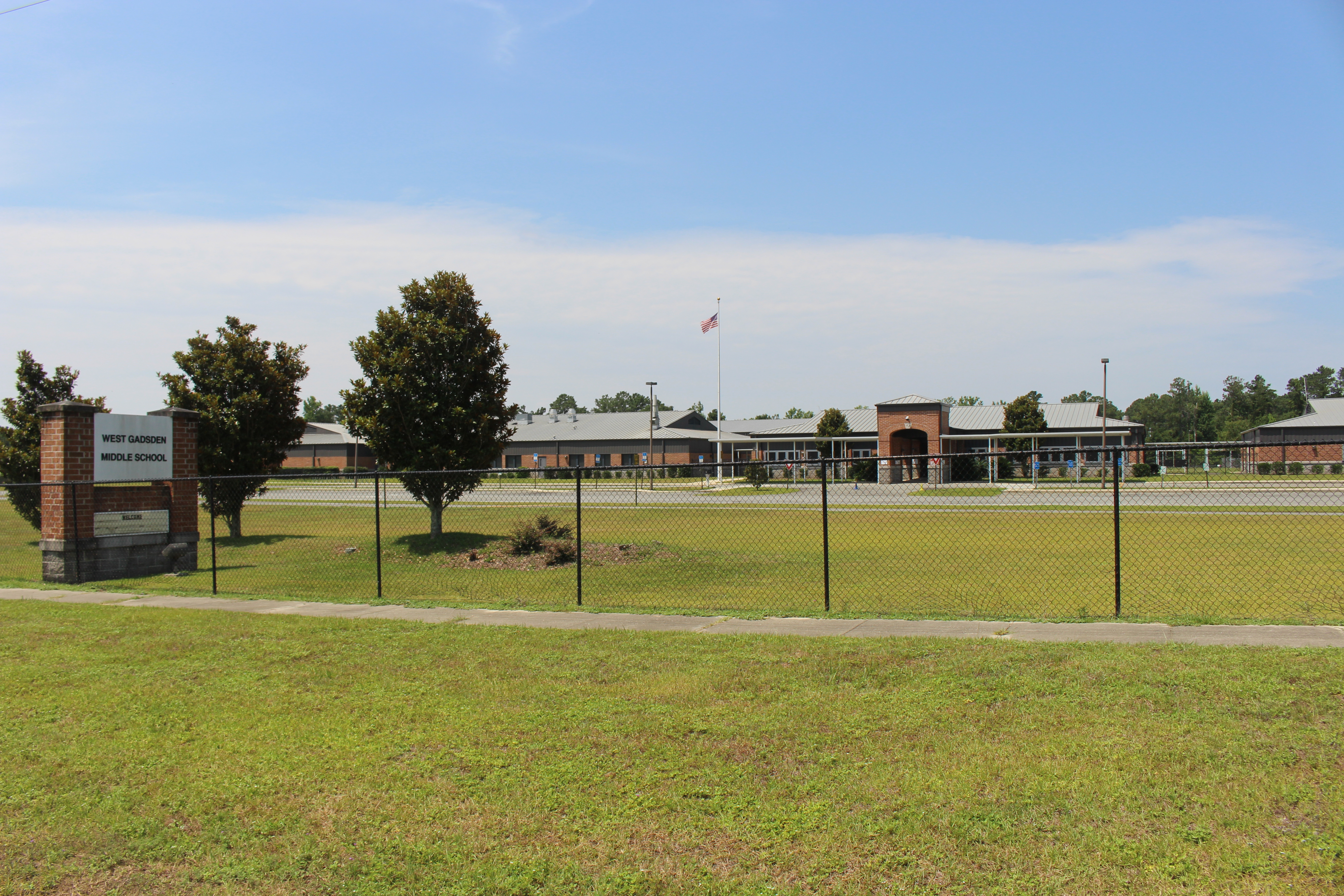
West Gadsden Middle School

Gadsden County School District operates two public schools in the community: Greensboro Elementary School and West Gadsden Middle School; the elementary facility was formerly Greensboro High School. Gadsden County High School (formerly East Gadsden High School) serves high school students.

In 2017, the former West Gadsden High School was renamed to West Gadsden Middle School as all high school students were moved to East Gadsden High School. At that time grades 4–5 moved from Greensboro Elementary to West Gadsden Middle.

The Earl Willis Community Center houses a library.

== Gallery ==
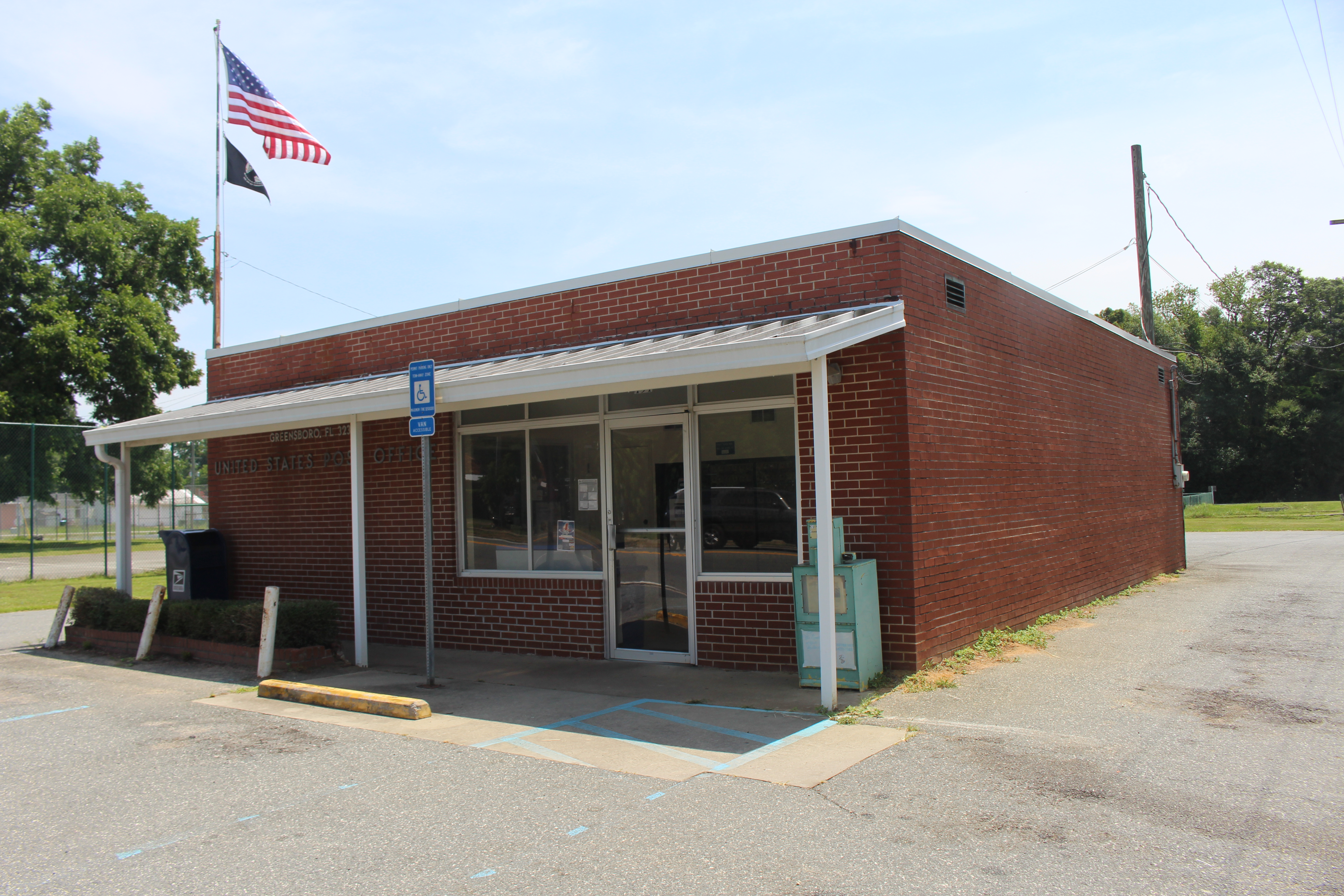
Greensboro Post Office

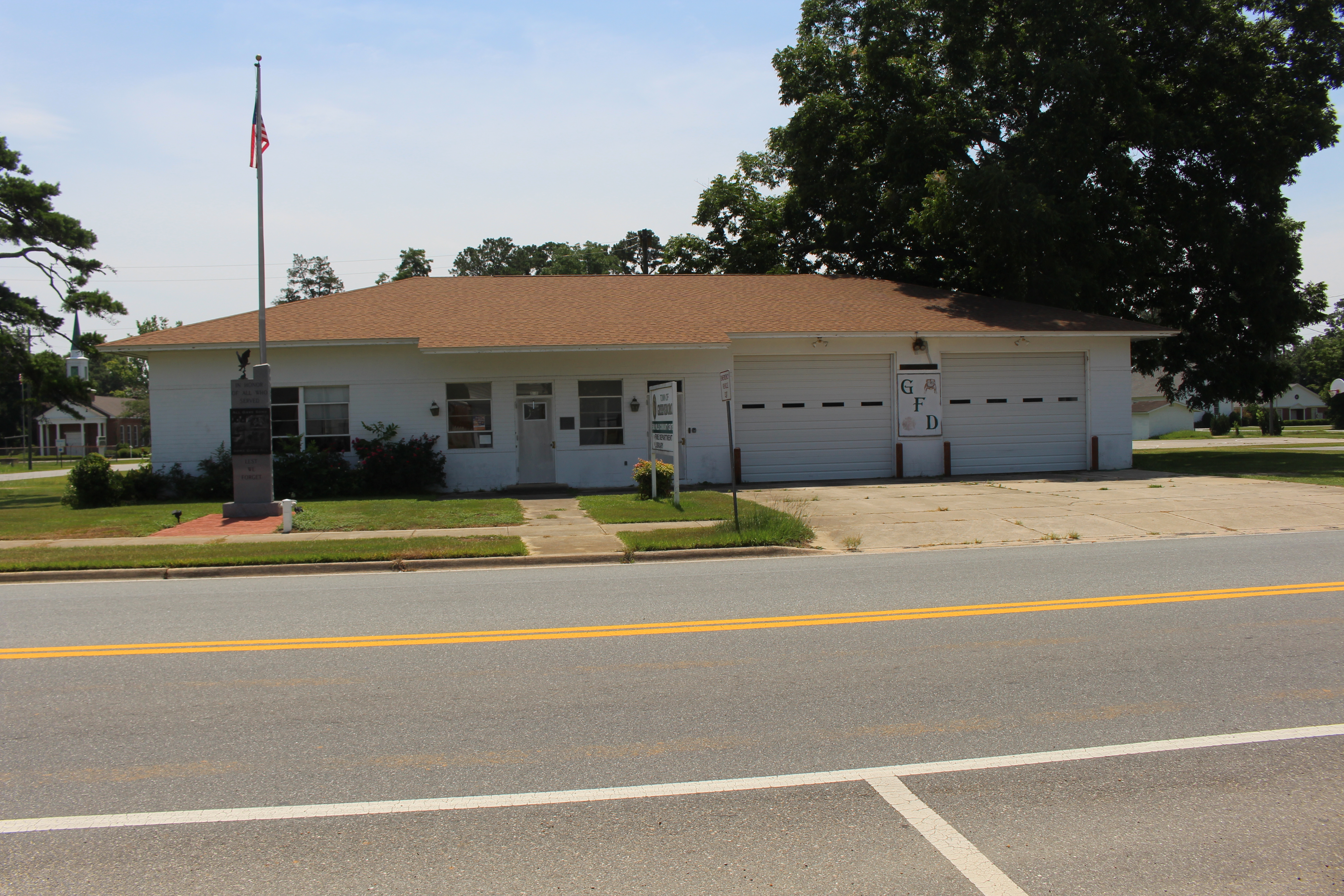
Fire Station and Earl Willis Community Center (including the library)

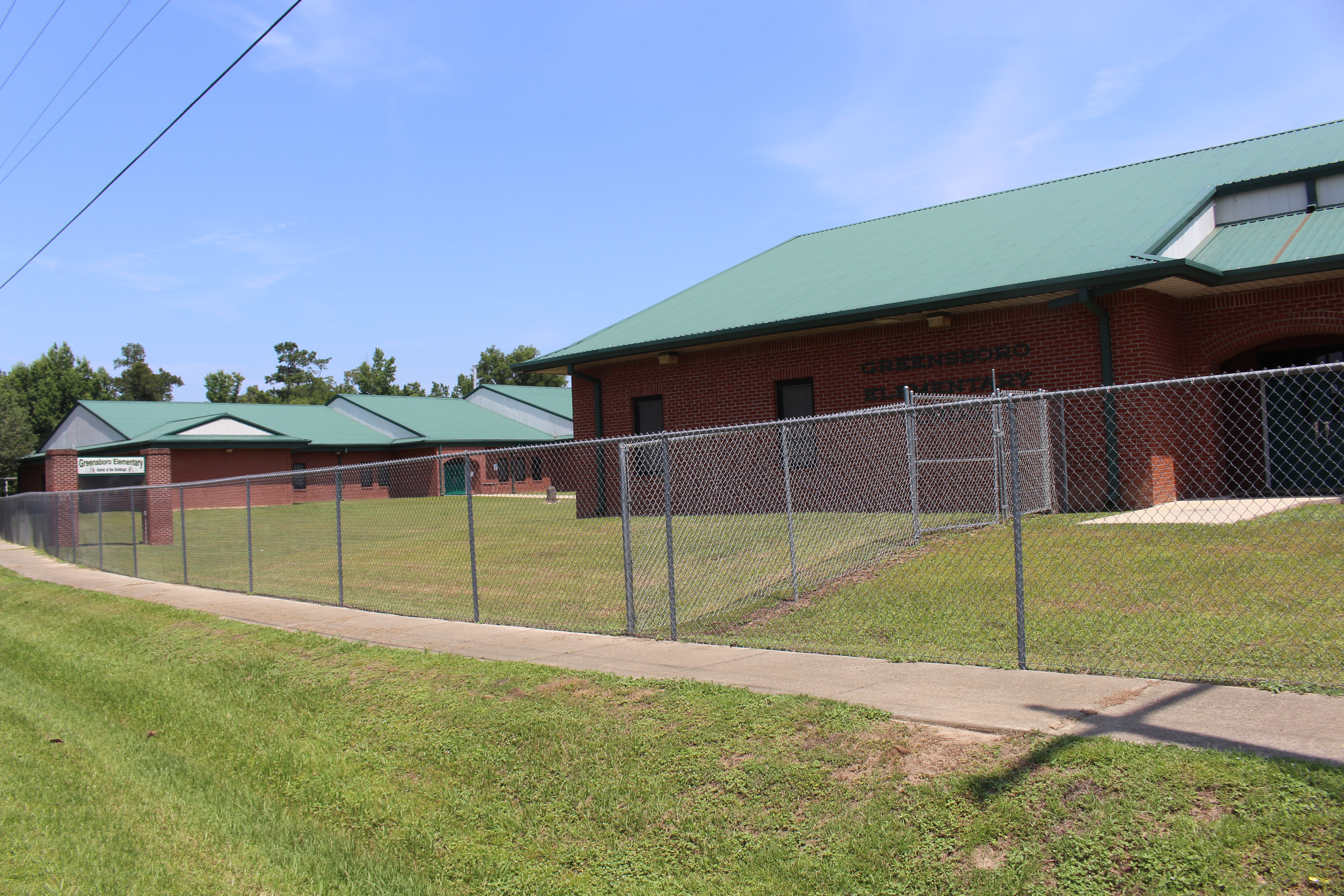
Greensboro Elementary School (previously Greensboro High School and West Gadsden High School)
