= West Gadsden High School =

Defunct school in Florida, United States

Coordinates: 30.5668°N 84.7336°W

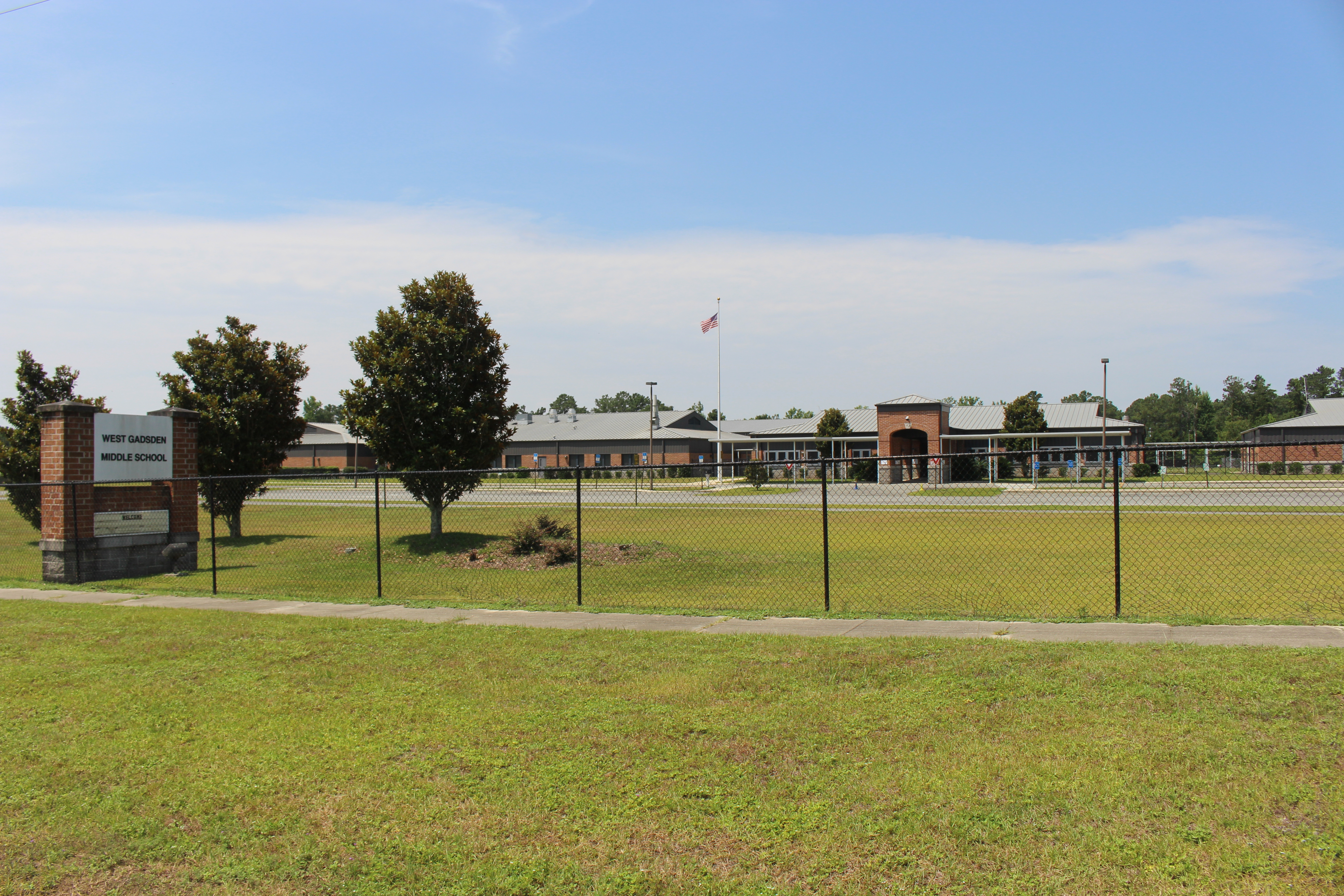
- West Gadsden Middle School, formerly West Gadsden High School
- Greensboro, Florida

Information
- Type: High school
- Established: 2004
- Grades: 5-12
- Enrollment: 487 (2004)
- Colors: Silver and Black
- Mascot: Panther

West Gadsden High School was a public secondary school in unincorporated Gadsden County, Florida, operated by Gadsden County School District. It is adjacent to the city of Greensboro, and served grades 5–12. Its building now houses West Gadsden Middle School.

The colors were silver and black and the mascot was the panther.

== History ==
The school was first established in the summer of 2004, housing students formerly attending Greensboro High School and Chattahoochee High School. A group of students from those two high schools selected the mascot, school name, and school colors. They intentionally chose not to use the colors and mascots used by the two previous schools so that West Gadsden High would have a new identity. The new school was to have a larger course offering than the previous Chattahoochee High.

It opened with 487 students. In its first year it held its classes at the former Greensboro High School, at 559 Greensboro Highway. There were four portable classrooms at the school during its first year. Its permanent campus, to be built next to the Greensboro Elementary building at the time, was scheduled to open in 2005. By 2007 the school moved into its current location, at 200 Providence Road. The former campus is now Greensboro Elementary School.

In 2017 it had approximately 482 students. As of March 2017 West Gadsden High was 76% occupied. On Tuesday April 4, 2017 the school board was scheduled to vote on whether East Gadsden High and the high school division of West Gadsden High should consolidate into a single high school. The board voted 3-2 to consolidate. The school would be renamed to West Gadsden Middle School as only middle school grades would remain. As part of the consolidation, grades 4-5 will move from area elementary schools to what would become West Gadsden Middle School. In March 2017 several members of the West Gadsden High community had opposed the consolidation plans.

The former principal of West Gadsden High, Juliette Jackson, became the principal of the consolidated Gadsden County High School.

== Athletics ==
The first athletic director and main coach of the American football team for West Gadsden was Robert Jackson, who served in that capacity at Greensboro High until the founding of West Gadsden High.

Brian Miller of the Tallahassee Democrat stated that the 2000s high school mergers damaged the school athletic spirit in the county as the former school identities were discarded. In October 2004 Jackson stated "We haven't figured out what we are all about. We don't have a flavor yet. We are not chocolate, we are not vanilla, we are not strawberry. We haven't played together long enough yet to figure it out, but we will."

Joey Striplin, previously the head American football coach at West Gadsden, became the head coach at East Gadsden High School in January 2017.

== Gallery ==
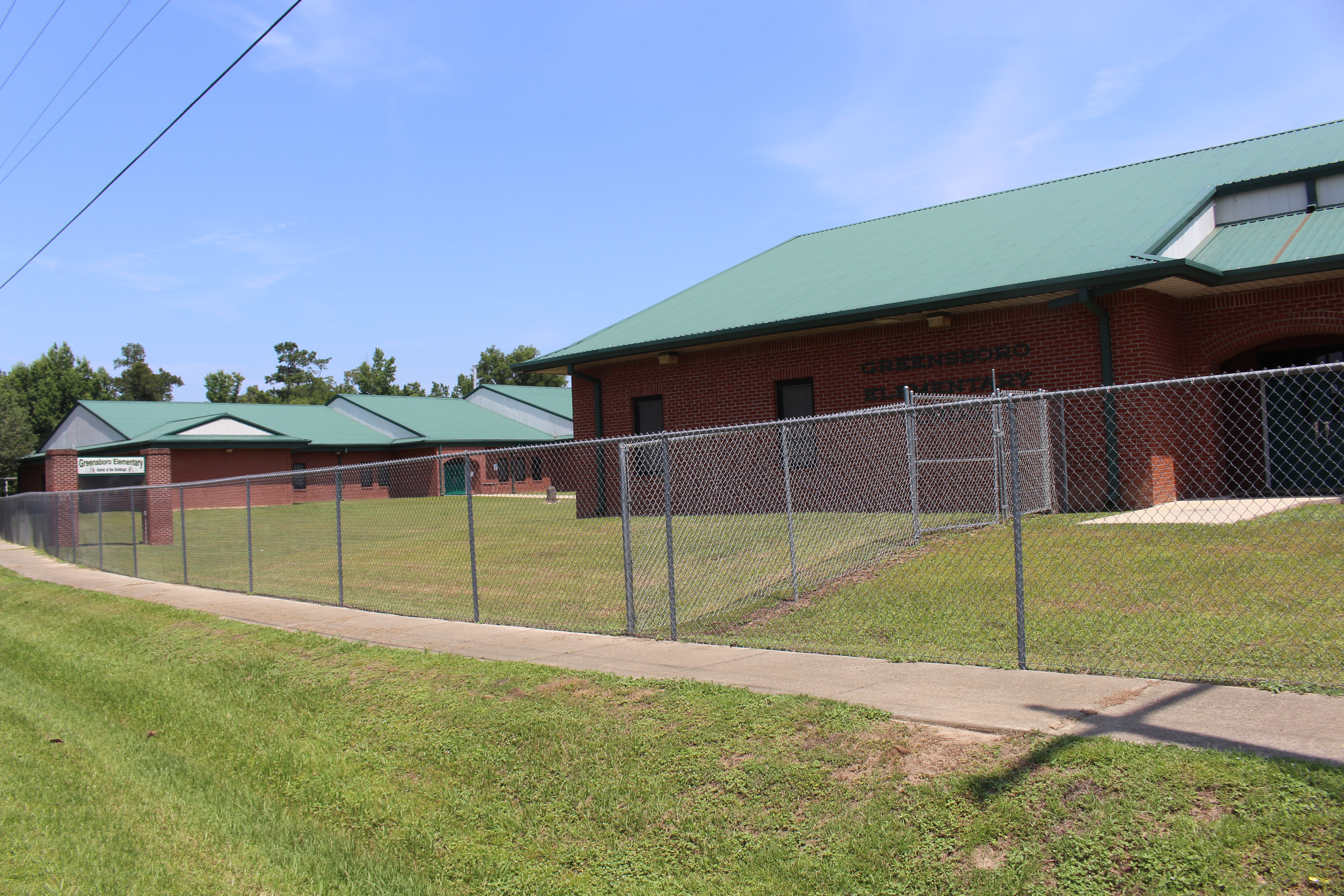
Greensboro Elementary School, formerly West Gadsden High School
