= Gadsden County High School =

Public school in Florida

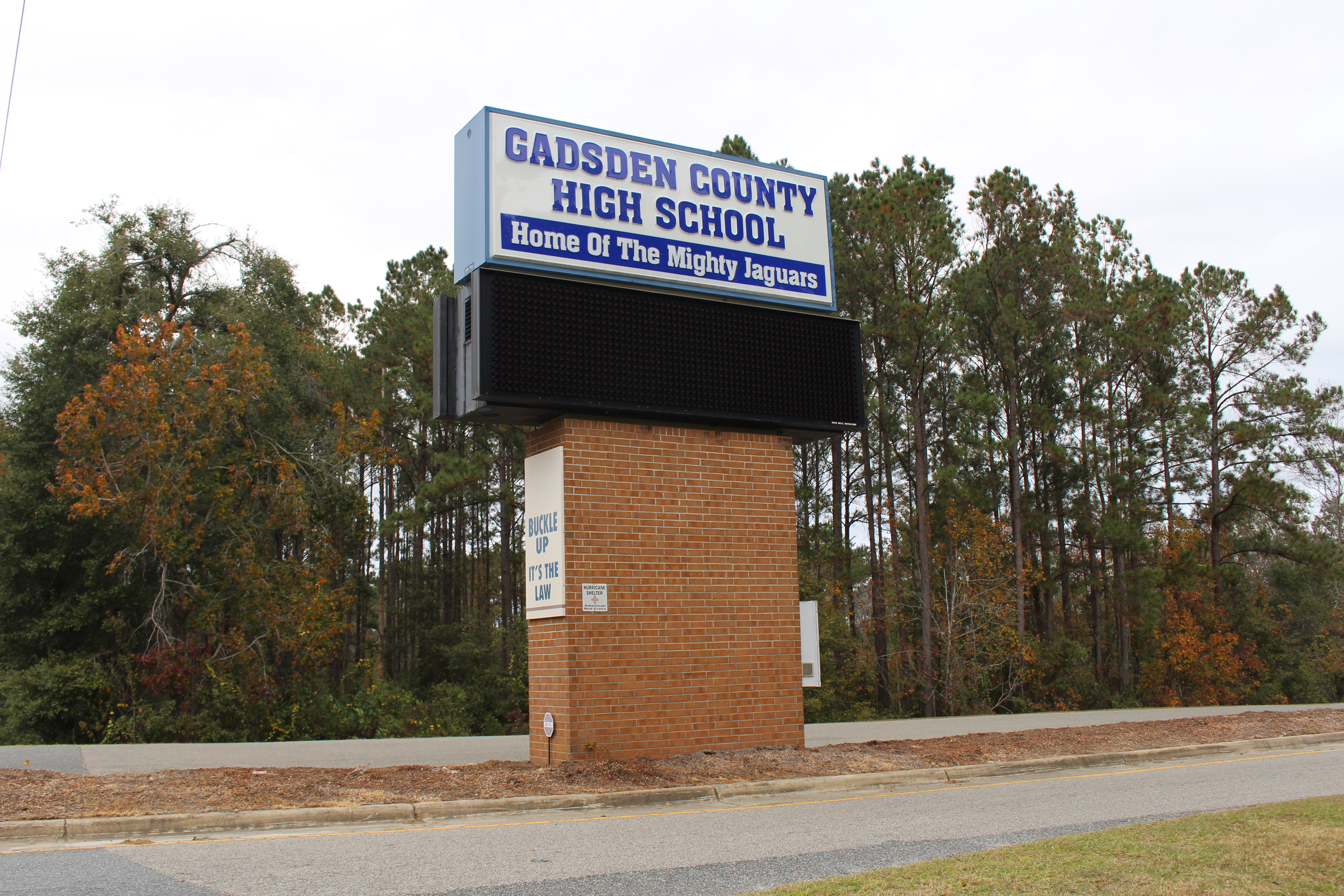
- entrance
- 27001 Blue Star Highway; Havana, Florida; United States

Information
- Established: 2003
- School district: Gadsden County Schools
- NCES School ID: 120060004082
- Principal: Pamela Jones
- Faculty: 56 (on FTE basis)
- Grades: 9 to 12
- Enrollment: 977
- Student to teacher ratio: 22.72
- Colors: Carolina blue, maroon, and navy
- Mascot: Jaguar
- Nickname: GC
- Website: gchs.gadsdenschools.org

Gadsden County High School, known as East Gadsden High School (EGHS) until 2016, was a public high school in unincorporated Gadsden County, Florida, operated by Gadsden County School District. It is between Havana and Quincy, and it has a "Havana, Florida" postal address. Starting in fall 2017 it is the zoned high school of all of Gadsden County. It closed in 2018 and was succeeded by Gadsden County High School with a student body 70 percent African American and about 25 percent Hispanic.

As of 2019 it has approximately 961 students. The school colors are: North Carolina blue, navy blue, maroon, black, and silver. The school mascot is the Jaguar.

== History ==
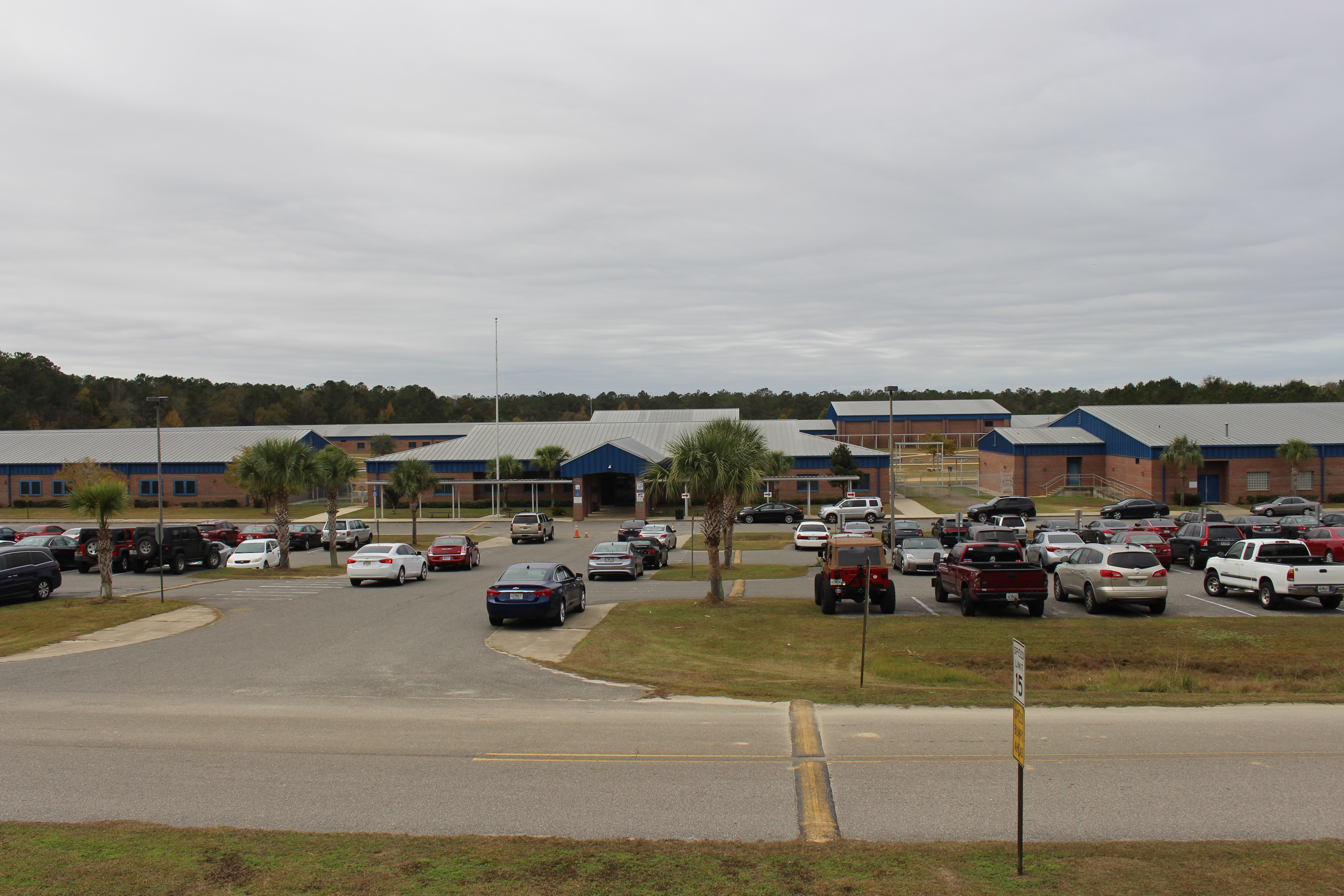
School building

It was formed from the combination of Havana Northside High School in Havana and James A. Shanks High School in Quincy. Both schools were formerly athletic rivals and represented their respective towns. Gerald Ensley of the Tallahassee Democrat wrote that "It is also a symbolic merger of [the two communities], which is eliciting concern as well as optimism." Upon its opening it was to serve Midway in addition to Quincy and Havana.

A committee of 26 students nominated proposals for various details, including the school's official mascot, emblem, colors, and flower, as well as the contents of the student handbook, that were voted upon by students at two middle schools and the two high schools that merged into East Gadsden High. A Florida Department of Education program for rural schools funded the construction, which began in March 2002. The total cost was $29.6 million. Ajax Building Corporation built the school.

The school was established on July 30, 2003, and opened on August 11 of that year, with at least 130 employees and 1,200 students. The mascot of East Gadsden High was the jaguar, the flower was the Rosa 'American Beauty' rose, and a lighted torch was the school emblem. There were three school colors: Carolina blue, silver, and light. The motto was "Lighting the path to excellence." The opening ceremony featured Al Lawson, a member of the Florida Senate from Tallahassee.

Immediately after the school's opening the administration made efforts to improve FCAT scores, including partnerships among teachers of separate subject areas and intensive mathematics classes; its two predecessor schools had previously scored poorly on the FCAT.

Joey Striplin, previously the head American football coach at West Gadsden High School, became the head coach at East Gadsden High in January 2017.

As of March 2017 East Gadsden High was 54% occupied. On Tuesday April 4, 2017 the school board was scheduled to vote on whether East Gadsden High and the high school portion of West Gadsden High should consolidate into a single high school. The board voted 3-2 to consolidate.

Prior to the 2017 consolidation, the school colors of East Gadsden were just North Carolina blue and silver. As part of the consolidation process, the colors from the former West Gadsden High School were added. The school mascot remained as the Jaguar. The previous principal of East Gadsden, Sonya Jackson, became the principal of West Gadsden Middle School. The former principal of West Gadsden High, Juliette Jackson, became the principal of the consolidated Gadsden County High.

== Campus ==
The campus is 16 miles (26 km) southwest of Havana and 6 miles (9.7 km) east of Quincy, along U.S. Highway 90. One Tallahassee Democrat article stated the complex was on a 75-acre (30 ha) plot of land, and another stated it was 100 acres (40 ha). Its capacity is for 1,200 students.

The complex houses eight academic buildings, all blue-trimmed and in brick. It also has a gymnasium with a 2,500 seats for spectators, and a 2-acre (0.81 ha) grassed area. The academic complex has a hallway the length of a football field. The gymnasium houses a dance studio, a wrestling room, a weight room, and a treatment clinic. Food is served in a combined cafeteria and performance stage; there are five serving lines. The ROTC complex includes a firing range. There is also a television studio.

== Athletics ==
Brian Miller of the Tallahassee Democrat stated that the 2000s high school mergers damaged the school athletic spirit in the county as the former school identities were discarded. A school football coach quoted in a Tallahassee Democrat article, Abdual Howard, stated that at East Gadsden the school colors and sports regalia had a lack of history and needed time to get more spirit behind them.

== Notable alumni ==
- Joshua Farmer, college football player for the Florida State Seminoles
- Darrell Jackson Jr., college football player for the Florida State Seminoles
- Derrick Kelly II, NFL football player
