= List of places in Florida: S =

This list of current cities, towns, unincorporated communities, counties, and other recognized places in the U.S. state of Florida also includes information on the number and names of counties in which the place lies, and its lower and upper ZIP Code bounds, if applicable.

Name of place	Number of counties	Counties	Lower zip code	Upper zip code
Sabal Palms Estates	1	Broward		
Saddlebag Lake Resort	1	Polk		
Saddlebunch Keys	1	Monroe		
Saddle Creek	1	Polk		
Safety Harbor	1	Pinellas	34695	
Saga Bay	1	Miami-Dade		
St. Andrews	1	Bay	32401	
St. Armands	1	Sarasota	33577	
St. Augustine	1	St. Johns	32084	95
St. Augustine Beach	1	St. Johns	32086	
St. Augustine Shores	1	St. Johns	32084	
St. Augustine South	1	St. Johns	32086	
St. Catherine	1	Sumter	33513	
St. Cloud	1	Osceola	34769	
St. Francis	1	Lake		
St. George	1	Broward		
St. George	1	Pinellas		
St. George Island	1	Franklin	32328	
St. Hebron	1	Gadsden		
St. James City	1	Lee	33956	
St. John	1	Gadsden		
St. Johns	1	St. Johns		
St. Johns Park	1	Duval	32210	
St. Johns Park	1	Flagler	32010	
St. Johns River Estates	1	Seminole		
St. Joseph	1	Gulf		
St. Joseph	1	Pasco	33525	
St. Josephs	1	Seminole		
St. Leo	1	Pasco	33574	
St. Lucie Village	1	St. Lucie	33452	
St. Marks	1	Wakulla	32355	
St. Marys	1	Nassau		
St. Nicholas	1	Duval	32225	
St. Pete Beach	1	Pinellas	33703	
St. Peter	1	Leon		
St. Petersburg	1	Pinellas	33701	99
St. Petersburg Beach	1	Pinellas	33706	
St. Petersburg Coast Guard Air Station	1	Pinellas		
St. Teresa	1	Franklin		
St. Teresa Beach	1	Franklin	32358	
Salem	1	Taylor	32356	
Salerno	1	Martin		
Salt Springs	1	Marion	32134	
Salvista	1	Lee	33903	
Samoset	1	Manatee	34208	
Sample Square	1	Broward	33064	
Sampson	1	Bradford		
Sampson	1	St. Johns		
Sampson City	1	Bradford	32091	
Samsula	1	Volusia	32069	
Samsula-Spruce Creek	1	Volusia		
San Antonio	1	Pasco	33576	
San Blas	1	Bay		
Sanborn	1	Wakulla	32304	
San Carlos	1	Lee		
San Carlos Park	1	Lee	33901	
San Castle	1	Palm Beach		
Sandalfoot Cove	1	Palm Beach	33432	
Sandalwood	1	Duval	32216	
Sand Cut	1	Palm Beach	33438	
Sanders Beach	1	Escambia		
Sanderson	1	Baker	32087	
Sanders Park	1	Broward		
Sandestin	1	Walton	32541	
Sand Lake	1	Orange	32819	
Sandland	1	Polk		
Sandpiper Cove	1	Okaloosa	32541	
Sandy	1	Manatee	33551	
Sandy Point	1	Suwannee		
Sanford	1	Seminole	32771	
Sanford and Everglades Junction	1	Seminole	32771	
Sanford Farms	1	Seminole		
Sangully	1	Polk	33801	
Sanibel	1	Lee	33957	
Sanibel Island	1	Lee		
San Jose	1	Duval	32217	
San Jose Estates	1	Duval	32217	
San Jose Forest	1	Duval		
Sanlando Springs	1	Seminole		
Sanlanta	1	Seminole		
San Marco	1	Duval	32211	
San Mateo	1	Duval	32218	
San Mateo	1	Putnam	32187	
San Pablo	1	Duval	32250	
San Souci	1	Duval	32216	
San Souci Estates	1	Miami-Dade	33161	
Sans Pareil	1	Duval		
Sans Souci	1	Charlotte		
Santa Barbara Shores	1	Broward		
Santa Clara	1	Gadsden		
Santa Fe	1	Alachua	32615	
Santa Fe Beach	1	Alachua		
Santa Fe Lake	1	Alachua	32631	
Santa Monica	1	Bay	32461	
Santa Monica	1	Duval	32216	
Santa Rosa	1	Walton		
Santa Rosa Beach	1	Walton	32459	
Santa Fe	1	Alachua	32616	
Santos	1	Marion	32670	
Sapp	1	Baker		
Sarabay Acres	1	Sarasota	33559	
Sarasota	1	Sarasota	34230	83
Sarasota Beach	1	Sarasota	33578	
Sarasota Colony	1	Glades		
Sarasota Heights	1	Sarasota		
Sarasota North	1	Sarasota	33580	
Sarasota South	1	Sarasota	33579	
Sarasota Southeast	1	Sarasota		
Sarasota Springs	1	Sarasota	33577	
Sarasota Square	1	Sarasota	33583	
Saratoga	1	Putnam	32089	
Sargent	1	Baker		
Sarno Plaza	1	Brevard	32935	
Satellite Beach	1	Brevard	32937	
Satsuma	1	Putnam	32189	
Saufley Field	1	Escambia	32509	
Saunders	1	Bay		
Sawdust	1	Gadsden	32351	
Sawgrass	1	St. Johns	32082	
Sawpit Bluff	1	Duval		
Saxton	1	Bradford		
Scanlon	1	Taylor		
Schall Circle	1	Palm Beach		
Schooley	1	Manatee		
School of the Resurrection	1	Duval		
Sconiers Mill	1	Walton		
Scotland	1	Gadsden	32333	
Scott Lake	1	Miami-Dade		
Scottown	1	Gadsden		
Scotts Ferry	1	Calhoun	32424	
Scottsmoor	1	Brevard	32775	
Seabreeze	1	Volusia		
Seacoll	1	Citrus		
Seaglades	1	Escambia	32507	
Seagrove Beach	1	Walton	32454	
Sea Ranch Lakes	1	Broward	33308	
Sears	1	Hendry		
Searstown	1	Polk	33801	
Seaside	1	Monroe	33037	
Sebastian	1	Indian River	32958	
Sebastian Highlands	1	Indian River	32958	
Sebring	1	Highlands	33870	
Sebring Southgate	1	Highlands	33870	
Secotan	1	Taylor		
Seffner	1	Hillsborough	33584	
Sellersville	1	Santa Rosa		
Selman	1	Calhoun		
Seminole	1	Okaloosa	32578	
Seminole	1	Pinellas	34642	
Seminole Heights	1	Hillsborough	33603	
Seminole Hills	1	Bay		
Seminole Indian Trust Lands	1	Broward		
Seminole Lake Country Club	1	Pinellas	33540	
Seminole Manor	1	Leon		
Seminole Manor	1	Palm Beach	33460	
Seminole Park	1	Pinellas	33540	
Seminole Shores	1	Martin		
Seminole Springs	1	Lake		
Seneca	1	Lake		
Senyah	1	Volusia		
Seva	1	Okaloosa		
Seven Springs	1	Pasco	34655	
Seville	1	Volusia	32190	
Sewall's Point	1	Martin	33457	
Shackleford	1	Escambia	32503	
Shadeville	1	Wakulla	32327	
Shadowlawn	1	Pinellas		
Shadow Lawn Estates	1	Alachua		
Shady	1	Marion	32670	
Shady Grove	1	Jackson	32442	
Shady Grove	1	Taylor	32357	
Shady Hills	1	Pasco	33526	
Shady Rest	1	Duval		
Shady Rest	1	Gadsden	32333	
Shalimar	1	Okaloosa	32579	
Shamrock	1	Dixie	32628	
Shands	1	Hernando		
Shangri-la	1	Pinellas	33540	
Shannon Wood	1	Alachua		
Shark Key	1	Monroe		
Sharpes	1	Brevard	32959	
Sharpstown	1	Calhoun		
Shawano	1	Palm Beach		
Shawnee	1	Glades	33440	
Sheffield	1	Jefferson		
Shell Bluff	1	Flagler	32010	
Shell Island	1	Collier		
Shell Island	1	Wakulla		
Shell Land	1	Pinellas	33516	
Shell Point	1	Wakulla		
Shell Point Village	1	Lee	33901	
Sheltering Pines	1	Lee	33901	
Shenandoah	1	Miami-Dade	33145	
Shenks	1	Alachua		
Sherman	1	Okeechobee	33472	
Sherwood Forest	1	Duval	32258	
Sherwood Park	1	Palm Beach	33444	
Shiloh	1	Alachua	32615	
Shiloh	1	Brevard	32780	
Shilow	1	Hillsborough	33566	
Shiney Town	1	Sarasota		
Shingle Creek	1	Osceola	32741	
Shired Island	1	Dixie		
Shoppers	1	Palm Beach	33434	
Shore Acres	1	Pinellas		
Shorewood	1	Broward	33441	
Siesta	1	Sarasota	34242	
Siesta Key	1	Sarasota	33578	
Siesta Key Village	1	Sarasota		
Sills	1	Jackson	32446	
Silver Beach Heights	1	Lake	32784	
Silver Bluff Estates	1	Miami-Dade		
Silver Lake	1	Lake		
SilverLeaf Plantation	1	St. Johns		
Silver Palm	1	Miami-Dade		
Silver Sands	1	Bay	32401	
Silver Shores	1	Broward	33308	
Silver Springs	1	Marion	34489	
Silver Springs	1	Okaloosa	32536	
Silver Springs Shores	1	Marion	34472	
Simpson Yard	1	Duval	32206	
Simsville	1	Jackson	32446	
Sinai	1	Jackson		
Singer Island	1	Palm Beach	33404	
Sink Creek	1	Jackson	32446	
Sipes	1	Seminole	32771	
Sirmans	1	Madison	32331	
Sisco	1	Putnam	32081	
Sixmile Bend	1	Palm Beach		
Sixmile Creek	1	Hillsborough		
Skipper	1	Wakulla		
Skycrest	1	Pinellas	33575	
Sky Lake	1	Orange	32809	
Skyland Heights	1	Alachua	32601	
Skyline	1	Santa Rosa		
Skytop	1	Lake		
Slade	1	Suwannee		
Slater	1	Lee		
Slaughter	1	Pasco	33597	
Slavia	1	Seminole	32765	
Sloans Ridge	1	Lake	32736	
Smith	1	Taylor		
Smith Creek	1	Wakulla	32304	
Smith Crossroads	1	Holmes	36314	
Smyrna	1	Holmes		
Snake Creek	1	Broward	33023	
Snapper Creek	1	Miami-Dade	33176	
Snapper Creek Park	1	Miami-Dade	33143	
Sneads	1	Jackson	32460	
Snead Island	1	Manatee		
Snell Island	1	Pinellas		
Snow Hill	1	Seminole	32765	
Snows Corner	1	Hillsborough		
Snug Harbor	1	Martin	33494	
Socrum	1	Polk	33805	
Solana	1	Charlotte	33950	
Solite	1	Clay		
Sopchoppy	1	Wakulla	32358	
Soroka Shores	1	Broward		
Sorrento	1	Lake	32776	
Sorrento Shores	1	Sarasota	33559	
Sorrento Shores South	1	Sarasota	33555	
South Allapattah	1	Miami-Dade		
South Apopka	1	Orange	32703	
South Arlington	1	Duval	32216	
South Bay	1	Palm Beach	33493	
South Bay Estates	1	Miami-Dade		
South Beach	1	Indian River		
South Boca Grande	1	Lee		
Southboro	1	Palm Beach	33405	
South Boyette	1	Hillsborough	33547	
South Bradenton	1	Manatee		
South Brooksville	1	Hernando		
Southchase	1	Orange		
South City	1	Leon		
South Clermont	1	Lake		
South Clewiston	1	Hendry	33440	
South Clinton Heights	1	Pasco		
South Cocoa Beach	1	Brevard		
South Daytona	1	Volusia	32121	
South Daytona West	1	Volusia		
Southeast	1	Polk	33880	
Southeast Arcadia	1	DeSoto		
South Federal	1	Martin	33497	
South Flomaton	1	Escambia		
South Florida Mailing Facility	1	Broward	33082	
Southfort	1	DeSoto		
South Fort Myers	1	Lee	33901	
Southgate	1	Sarasota	34277	
South Gate Ridge	1	Sarasota	33581	
South Highpoint	1	Pinellas		
South Jacksonville	1	Duval	32207	
Southland	1	Charlotte		
Southmere	1	Brevard		
South Metro	1	Duval		
South Miami	1	Miami-Dade	33143	
South Miami Heights	1	Miami-Dade	33157	
South Mulberry	1	Polk	33860	
South Ocala	1	Marion	32670	
South Palm Beach	1	Palm Beach	33480	
South Pasadena	1	Pinellas	33707	
South Patrick	1	Brevard	32937	
South Patrick Shores	1	Brevard	32937	
South Peninsula	1	Volusia	32016	
South Pine Lakes	1	Lake		
South Ponte Vedra Beach	1	St. Johns	32082	
Southport	1	Bay	32409	
South Port	1	Osceola		
South Port St. Lucie	1	St. Lucie	33452	
South Punta Gorda Heights	1	Charlotte	33950	
Southridge	1	Duval	32216	
South Sarasota	1	Sarasota		
South Shore	1	Palm Beach	33440	
Southside	1	Broward	33316	
Southside	1	Lake	32784	
Southside	1	Polk	33813	
Southside	1	Sarasota	33579	
Southside Estates	1	Duval	32216	
South Tampa	1	Hillsborough		
South Trail	1	Sarasota	34231	
South Venice	1	Sarasota	34293	
South Wauchula	1	Hardee		
South Weeki Wachee	1	Hernando		
Southwest	1	Palm Beach	33165	
Southwest Ranches	1	Broward	33330	
Southwood	1	Orange	32809	
Spanish Harbor	1	Monroe		
Spanish River	1	Palm Beach	33431	
Sparr	1	Marion	32192	
Spaulding	1	Duval	32218	
Sportsman Village	1	Glades		
Sportsmens Club	1	Palm Beach		
Spray	1	Madison		
Spring Creek	1	Wakulla	32305	
Springdale	1	Taylor		
Springfield	1	Bay	32401	
Springfield	1	Duval		
Spring Glen	1	Duval	32207	
Springhead	1	Hillsborough	33566	
Spring Hill	1	Alachua		
Spring Hill	1	Hernando	34606	
Spring Hill	1	Leon		
Spring Hill	1	Santa Rosa		
Spring Lake	1	Hernando	33512	
Spring Lake	1	Highlands	33870	
Spring Park	1	Duval	32207	
Spring Ridge	1	Gilchrist		
Spring Warrior Camp	1	Taylor		
Springside	1	Putnam	32077	
Springside Park	1	Putnam		
Springs Plaza	1	Seminole	32779	
Springville	1	Columbia		
Spuds	1	St. Johns	32033	
Stacy Street	1	Palm Beach		
Stanton	1	Marion	32695	
Starke	1	Bradford	32091	
Starkes Ferry	1	Marion		
Starkey Ranch	1	Pasco		
Starr	1	Suwannee		
State Highway	1	Seminole	32733	
State Line	1	Jackson		
Steckert	1	Baker		
Steele Church	1	Walton	32433	
Steele City	1	Jackson		
Steinhatchee	1	Taylor	32359	
Stella	1	Escambia		
Stephensville	1	Taylor	32359	
Sterling	1	Miami-Dade		
Stern	1	Madison		
Stetson	1	Volusia	32720	
Steward City	1	Dixie		
Stockade	1	Duval		
Stock Island	1	Monroe	33040	
Stokes Ferry	1	Citrus		
Stone Island	1	Volusia		
Storey	1	Citrus		
Streamline	1	Palm Beach	33476	
Stuart	1	Martin	34994	97
Stuckey	1	Lake		
Sturkey	1	Pasco		
Suburban Heights	1	Alachua	32601	
Sugar Junction	1	Hendry		
Sugarloaf	1	Monroe	33044	
Sugarloaf Key	1	Monroe	33042	
Sugarloaf Shores	1	Monroe	33044	
Sugar Mill Estates	1	Volusia		
Sugarmill Woods	1	Citrus	32646	
Sugarton	1	Hendry		
Sulphur Springs	1	Hillsborough	33604	
Sumatra	1	Liberty	32335	
Summerfield	1	Marion	34492	
Summer Haven	1	St. Johns	32084	
Summerland Key	1	Monroe	33042	
Summerport Beach	1	Orange	32787	
Sumner	1	Levy		
Sumter Correctional Institute	1	Sumter	33513	
Sumterville	1	Sumter	33585	
Sunbeam	1	Duval	32223	
Sun City	1	Hillsborough	33586	
Sun City Center	1	Hillsborough	33571	
Suncoast Estates	1	Lee	33903	
Sun Garden	1	Clay	32043	
Sun Haven	1	Sarasota	33577	
Suniland	1	Miami-Dade	33156	
Sunland	1	Seminole	32771	
Sunland Estates	1	Seminole		
Sunland Gardens	1	St. Lucie	33450	
Sunniland	1	Collier	33156	
Sun 'n Lake of Sebring	1	Highlands		
Sun 'n Lakes Estates	1	Highlands	33852	
Sunny Hills	1	Washington	32428	
Sunny Isles	1	Miami-Dade	33160	
Sunny Isles Beach	1	Miami-Dade	33160	
Sunnyland	1	Sarasota	33583	
Sunnyland Station	1	Hendry		
Sunnyside	1	Bay	32461	
Sunnyside	1	Lake	32748	
Sunnyside Beach	1	Bay		
Sun Ray	1	Polk	33843	
Sunrise	1	Broward	33313	
Sunrise Golf Village	1	Broward		
Sunrise Harbor	1	Miami-Dade		
Sunrise Heights	1	Broward	33314	
Sunrise Key	1	Broward		
Sunset	1	Miami-Dade		
Sunset Beach	1	Pinellas	33740	
Sunset Corners	1	Miami-Dade		
Sunset Gardens	1	Brevard	32901	
Sunset Harbor	1	Marion	32691	
Sunset Island	1	Miami-Dade	33140	
Sunset Point	1	Monroe	33070	
Sunshine	1	Hillsborough	33615	
Sunshine Acres	1	Broward		
Sunshine Beach	1	Pinellas	33708	
Sunshine Park	1	Broward		
Sunshine Ranches	1	Broward	33314	
Sun Swept Isles	1	Broward		
Sun-Tan Village	1	Miami-Dade		
Suntree	1	Brevard	32941	
Sunvale	1	Highlands		
Sun Valley	1	Palm Beach		
Surf	1	Wakulla		
Surf 5 & 10	1	Broward	33020	
Surfside	1	Miami-Dade	33154	
Sutton	1	Hillsborough		
Suwannee	1	Dixie	32692	
Suwannee	1	Suwannee		
Suwannee River	2	Gilchrist, Levy	32692	
Suwannee Springs	1	Suwannee	32060	
Suwannee Valley	1	Columbia	32055	
Svea	1	Okaloosa	32567	
Sweet Gum Head	1	Holmes	32464	
Sweetwater	1	Duval	32222	
Sweetwater	1	Hardee		
Sweetwater	1	Liberty		
Sweetwater	1	Miami-Dade	33144	
Sweetwater Creek	1	Hillsborough	33614	
Sweetwater Oaks	1	Seminole	32750	
Swift	1	Polk		
Switzerland	1	St. Johns	32259	
Sycamore	1	Gadsden	32351	
Sydney	1	Hillsborough	33587	
Sylvania	1	Washington		
Sylvan Lake	1	Seminole		
Sylvan Shores	1	Highlands	32757	
Sylvan Shores	1	Lake	32757	

== See also ==
- Florida
- List of municipalities in Florida
- List of former municipalities in Florida
- List of counties in Florida
- List of census-designated places in Florida
