= List of county roads in Gadsden County, Florida =

- County road shields used in Florida

Highway names
- Interstates: Interstate X (I-X)
- US Highways: U.S. Highway X (US X)
- State: State Road X (SR X)
- County: County Road X (CR-X)

System links
- County roads in Florida; County roads in Gadsden County

The following is a list of county roads in Gadsden County, Florida. All county roads are maintained by the county in which they reside, although not all routes are marked with standard county road shields.

== County roads in Gadsden County ==
Route	Road Name(s)	From	To	Notes
CR 12	Fifth Avenue East, Fairbanks Ferry Road	US 27 (SR 63) / SR 12 / CR 12A in Havana	CR 12 at the Leon County line east-northeast of Havana	Former SR 12
CR 12A	Ninth Avenue East, Kemp Road	US 27 (SR 63) / SR 12 / CR 12 in Havana	CR 157 east of Havana	Former SR 12A
CR 12B	Glades Road	US 27 (SR 63) north of Havana	CR 12 northeast of Havana	Former SR 12B
CR 65	North Madison Street, Attapulgus Highway	US 90 (SR 10) / SR 12 / Madison Street in Quincy	SR 241 at the Georgia state line north-northeast of Quincy	Former SR 65
CR 65A	Juniper Creek Road, Dewey Johnson Way, Porter Mitchell Road	SR 65 south-southwest of Sawdust SR 12 south of Gretna CR 65 west-southwest of Dogtown	SR 65 north-northeast of Sawdust CR 270 in Gretna Porter Mitchell Road at the Georgia state line west-northwest of Dogtown	Former SR 65A
CR 65B	Old Federal Road	SR 65 south-southwest of Sawdust CR 65A west-northwest of Dogtown	CR 268 northeast of Wetumpka Betts Community Road at the Georgia state line west-northwest of Dogtown	Former SR 65B
CR 65C	Pat Thomas Parkway, McCall Bridge Road	SR 267 in Wetumpka	Dead end on shore of Lake Talquin southeast of Wetumpka	Former SR 65C
CR 65D	Telogia Creek Road	SR 12 in Juniper	CR 65A southeast of Juniper	Former SR 65D
CR 153	Iron Bridge Road, Old Bainbridge Road	CR 0361 at the Leon County line southeast of Havana	CR 12A east of Havana	Former SR 153
CR 157	Old Bainbridge Road, Concord Road, Concord-Bainbridge Road	CR 153 southeast of Havana	SR 111 at the Georgia state line northeast of Darsey	Former SR 157
CR 157A	Cairo-Concord Road	CR 12 east-northeast of Concord	Concord Road at the Georgia state line northeast of Concord	Former SR 157A
CR 159	Dover Road, Shady Rest Road, Scotland Road, Salem Road	US 90 (SR 10) / CR 268 in Midway CR 270 northwest of Scotland SR 12 / Salem Road west of Havana	CR 270 in Scotland US 27 (SR 63) south of Havana SR 309 at the Georgia state line north-northwest of Dogtown	Former SR 159
CR 159A	Dodger Ball Park Road, Coastal Lumber Road	CR 65 west-northwest of Dogtown CR 159 north-northwest of Havana	CR 159 north-northwest of Dogtown US 27 (SR 63) north of Havana	Former SR 159A
CR 161	Point Milligan Road	SR 12 east-northeast of Quincy	CR 159 northeast of Branchville	Former SR 161
CR 161A	Dogtown Road	CR 161 in Branchville	CR 159 in Dogtown	Former SR 161A
CR 256	Lee Parramore Road	CR 379	Spitz Farm Road	former SR 256; Unsigned
CR 267A	Spooner Road	CR 65B northeast of Wetumpka	SR 267 north-northeast of Wetumpka	Former SR 267A
CR 268	Hardaway Highway, Church Street, Solomon Dairy Road, 14th Street, Washington Street, Pat Thomas Parkway Jefferson Street, Adams Street, High Bridge Road, Dover Road	CR 269 west-southwest of Rosedale US 90 (SR 10) / SR 12 / SR 267 in Quincy	US 90 (SR 10) / SR 12 / SR 267 in Quincy US 90 (SR 10) / CR 159 in Midway	Former SR 268
CR 268A	Cochran Road	CR 270A north-northeast of Greensboro	CR 268 south of Hardaway	Former SR 268A
CR 269	Pine Grove Church Road, Bonnie Hill Road, Little Sycamore Road, Main Street	SR 12 southwest of Juniper CR 270 northwest of Sycamore	CR 270 east-southeast of Sycamore US 90 (SR 10) / Main Street in Chattahoochee	Former SR 269
CR 269A	Lincoln Road, Maple Street, East Washington Street, Faceville Road	CR 268 in Rosedale US 90 (SR 10 east of Chattahoochee	CR 269 in Chattahoochee SR 97 at the Georgia state line east-northeast of Chattahoochee	Former SR 269A
CR 269B	Juniper Road	CR 269 west-southwest of Juniper	CR 379 west-southwest of Greensboro	Former SR 269B
CR 270	Sycamore Road, Jackson Street, Selman Street, Tolar White Road, Bassett Road, Dewey Johnson Way, Woodward Road, Shady Rest Road	CR 270 at the Liberty County line east-northeast of Sycamore SR 12 southwest of Gretna CR 65 north of Quincy SR 12 in Shady Rest	CR 270A north-northeast of Greensboro CR 268 in Gretna CR 161 southwest of Branchville US 27 (SR 63) east of Gibson	Former SR 270
CR 270A	Flat Creek Road, MLK Boulevard, Luten Road, Salter Road	CR 269 south-southwest of Rosedale CR 270 west of Gretna SR 267 north of Quincy	SR 12 south-southwest of Gretna CR 268 north-northwest of Quincy CR 65 north of Quincy	Former SR 270A; segment north of Quincy is typoed on the current FDOT Gadsden County map as CR 2704.
CR 270B	Lonnie Clark Road	CR 270 west of Greensboro	CR 270A north-northwest of Greensboro	Former SR 270B
CR 272	Hutchison Ferry Road, Bainbridge Highway, Old Philadelphia Church Road	CR 379A east-northeast of Mount Pleasant SR 267 north of Quincy	SR 267 east of Mount Pleasant CR 65 north of Quincy	Former SR 272
CR 274	Providence Road, Sawdust Road, Ben Bostick Road, South Atlanta Street, Martin Luther King Jr. Boulevard	SR 12 east of Greensboro CR 274 west-southwest of Quincy CR 274 in Quincy	US 90 (SR 10) / SR 12 / Olean Street west of Quincy US 90 (SR 10) / SR 12 in Quincy CR 268 in Quincy	Former SR 274
CR 379	Juniper Road, Edwin Clark Road, Mt. Pleasant Road	SR 12 south-southwest of Greensboro CR 268 west-northwest of Gretna	CR 270A northwest of Greensboro Mt. Pleasant Road at the Georgia state line east-northeast of Oak Grove	Former SR 379
CR 379A	Glory Road, Hutchison Ferry Road	CR 268 east of Gretna	Hutchinson Ferry Road at the Georgia state line east-northeast of Oak Grove	Former SR 379A
CR 379B	Smithtown Road	US 90 (SR 10) / Atwater Road in Oak Grove	Smithtown Road at the Georgia state line north-northeast of Oak Grove	Former SR 379B; no connection to CR 379 or CR 379A
CR 483	Matthew Clark Road	CR 379 west-southwest of Greensboro Hough Farm Road / Spitz Farm Road / Howell Road southeast of Mount Pleasant	CR 270 west of Greensboro SR 267 north of Quincy	
