= Sweetwater, Florida =

Sweetwater, Florida may refer to:

- Sweetwater, Duval County, Florida, a place in Florida
- Sweetwater, Liberty County, Florida, a place in Florida
- Sweetwater, Miami-Dade County, Florida
- Sweetwater Ranch, Florida, in Hardee County

== See also ==
- Sweetwater Creek, Florida
