= Florida State Road 12 =

Highway in Florida, US

State Road 12
- SR 12 in red, CR 12 in purple, former SR 12 in brown

Route information
- Maintained by FDOT
- Length: 42.176 mi (67.876 km)
- Existed: 1945 renumbering (definition)–present

Major junctions
- West end: SR 20 in Bristol
- I-10 near Greensboro; US 90 / SR 267 in Quincy
- East end: US 27 / CR 12A in Havana

Location
- Country: United States
- State: Florida
- Counties: Liberty, Gadsden

Highway system
- Florida State Highway System; Interstate; US; State; Former; Pre‑1945; Toll; Scenic
← SR 11	→ SR 13

State Road 12 (SR 12) is an east–west route in the Florida Panhandle, running from SR 20 in Bristol to U.S. Route 27 (US 27) in Havana.

The route continues as County Road 12 (CR 12) on both ends, on the western end running south to SR 65, and on the east running to US 319.

== Route description ==
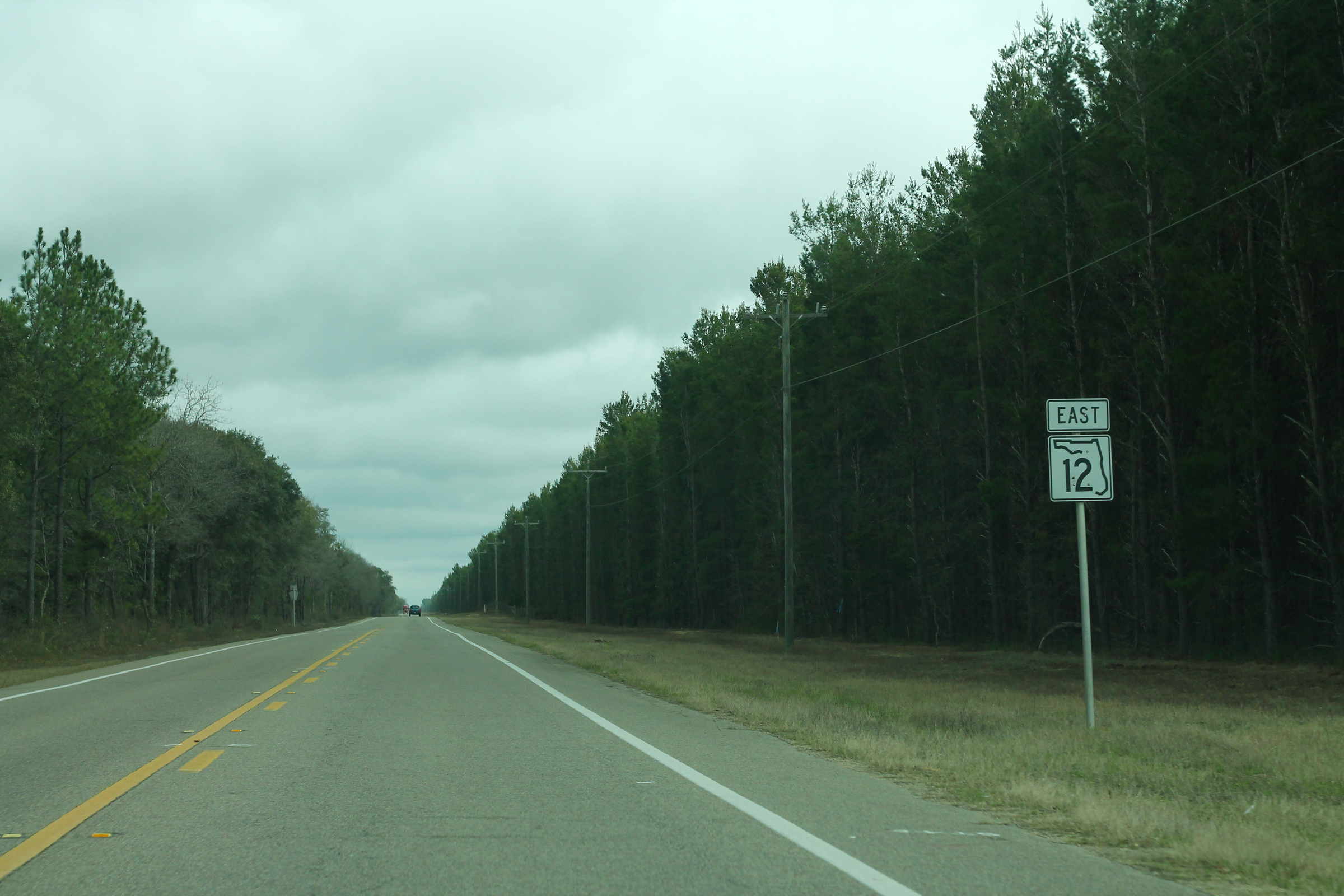
SR 12 in Liberty County

SR 12 begins at SR 20 in Bristol, although originally it starts off heading in more of a northerly direction then curves more towards the east. The surroundings are primarily forestland until it reaches CR 270, a bi-county east-west route in Liberty and Gadsden Counties. Pine trees become more prominent after this and the next moderate intersection is with CR 1641 which spans southeast towards Hosford and northwest to Torreya State Park. The segment south of SR 12 used to be County Road 271. State Road 12 continues moving relatively northeast as it crosses the Liberty-Gadsden County Line and passes by the Poley Branch Church. From there it descends into a valley, but emerges from it before approaching the southern terminus of County Road 269, a road in western Gadsden County that runs as far north as Chattahoochee before crossing the Florida-Georgia State Line. Later, it curves from east to north around a small farm across from the western terminus of County Road 65D (Telogia Creek Road), a county road that eventually leads to a state road which will soon prove to be far more significant. The next intersection is CR 379 (Juniper Road). After SR 12 veers off to the right from Coleman Road it enters the City of Greensboro and then crosses an Apalachicola Northern Railroad line before curving back to the same direction. Within downtown Greensboro, SR 12 turns right at Selman Street joining a brief concurrency with CR 270. Three and a half blocks later CR 270 turns north onto Tolar White Road and SR 12 continues as Selman Street. The last non-local street in Greensboro is the western terminus of CR 274 (Providence Road). From there, SR 12 is named Greensboro Highway, which crosses a bridge over Telogia Creek at Shepards Pond, and shortly after this curves to the northeast to become a four-lane divided highway for the diamond interchange with Interstate 10 (I-10) at exit 174.

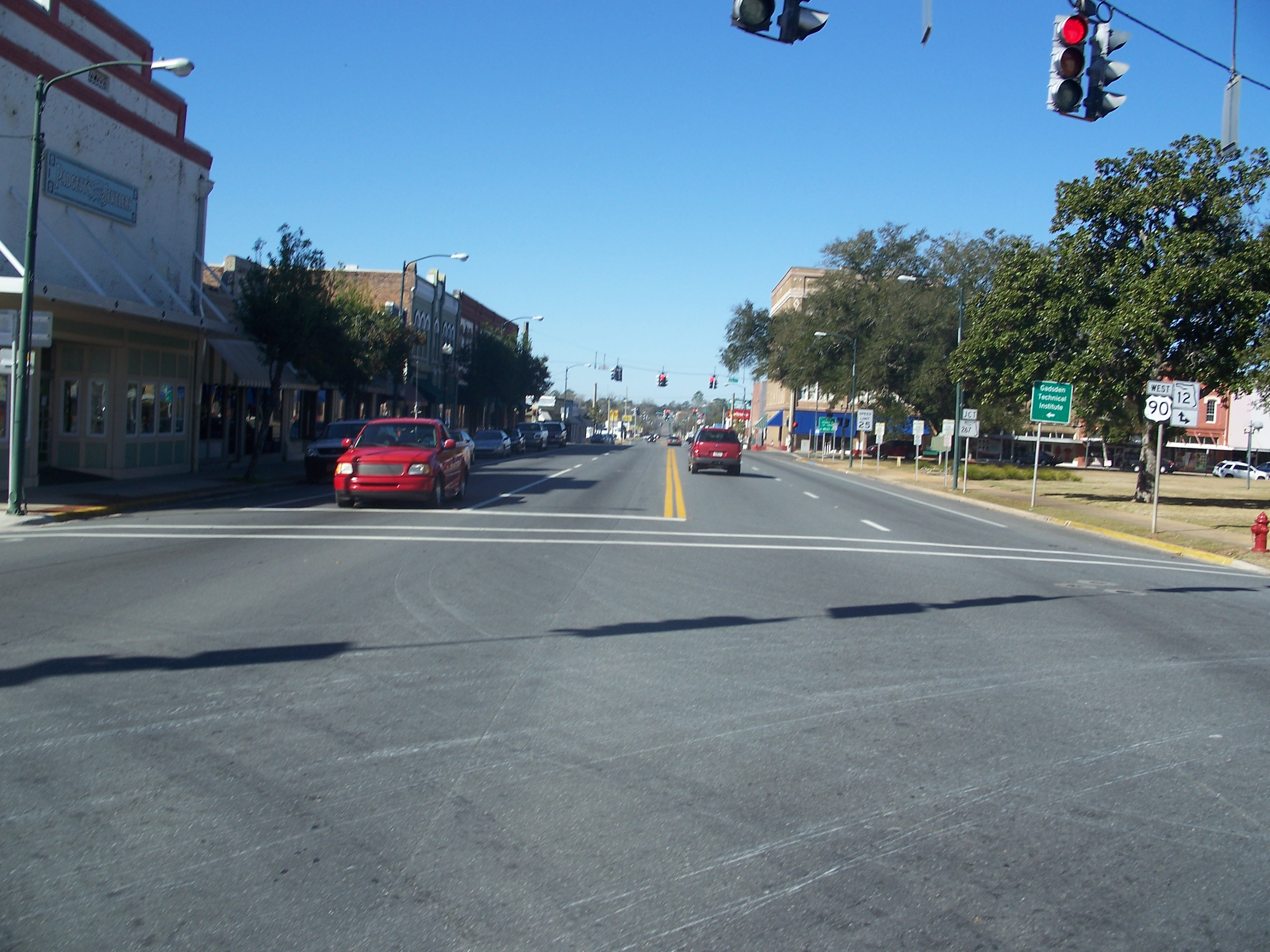
US 90 and SR 12 in downtown Quincy

The divided segment comes to an end north of I-10 between Beaver Lake Road and Thomas Smith Farm Road. As SR 12 curves back toward the east, it encounters another section of CR 270 (Bassett Road) and the eastern terminus of CR 270A (Flat Creek Road), just before a wye intersection with SR 65 (Hosford Highway) where the west end of concurrency with the route begins. Immediately after this intersection SR 12/65 has another intersection with another one of SR 65's suffixed routes, specifically County Road 65A (Dewey Johnson Way) that leads north to Gretna. In Douglas City SRs 12/65 serves as the address for the Gadsden Correctional Facility, and then an at-grade crossing with the CSX Tallahassee Subdivision a line that carried the Amtrak Sunset Limited until it was truncated to New Orleans, Louisiana by Hurricane Katrina in 2005. Right after this crossing SRs 12/65 has an intersection with U.S. Route 90, and joins that route in another concurrency. The Tallahassee Subdivision begins to move away from US 90/SRs 12/65, but almost comes back just before the intersection with CR 274 before entering Quincy where the concurrency becomes West Jefferson Street. Within the city the road encounters an at-grade railroad crossing with a spur of the Tallahassee Subdivision. This spur runs next to the beginning of the concurrency with SR 267 and CR 268 once again. The concurrency with SR 267 may have been in the process of being eliminated though, as a four-lane stub extends a block north of US 90. US 90/SRs 12/65/267/CR 268 enter the Quincy Historic District at Stewart Street. Four blocks later at Adams Street, SR 267 leave US 90 to the north, and CR 268 turns in the opposite direction. Between there it runs in front of the Gadsden County Courthouse and a block later at Madison Street, passes the former routing of SR 12. US 90 and SR 12 head east out of the city and at SR 269, SR 12 turns north off the US 90 concurrency.

At Quincy Municipal Airport and East King Street (the former routing of SR 12), SR 269 ends and SR 12 turns east onto Havana Highway. The road veers off to the right at the southern terminus of CR 161 (Point Milligan Road) where a small gas station can be found at the fork between the two roads. In Shady Rest the eastern segment of CR 270 (Shady Rest Road) runs southeast to Scotland and Gibson, while SR 12 curves along the north side of Lake Tallavana. Curving back to the east, the route runs past five churches then approaches CR 159 (Salem Road) where Havana Highway is changed to Ninth Avenue West. At the same time, CR 159 joins SR 12 in a one block unsigned concurrency that lasts until the intersection of SR 159. Finally entering Havana the road crosses a CSX Railroad line and curves straight east just before the eastern terminus at US 27. However Ninth Avenue East continues eastward as CR 12A.

== History ==
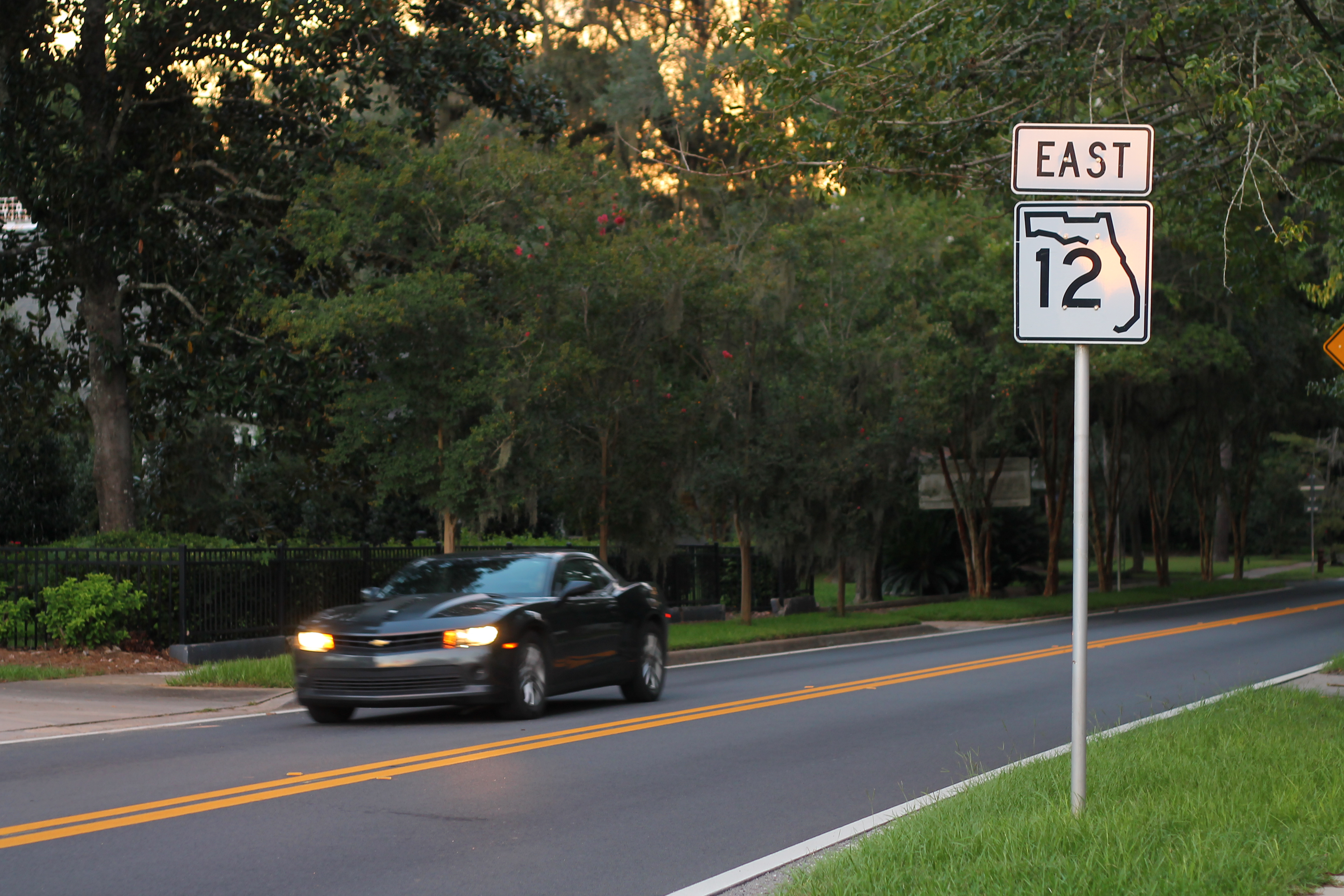
East King Street and former segment of SR 12 in Quincy

The entire route originally was a longer state highway that included current county extensions. From 1926 to 1949, the segment between Quincy and Havana was part of US 90, and was part of US 90 Alternate only in 1950.

In 2017, two years after the opening of the Quincy Bypass (SR 269) to help remove through truck traffic away from the city's downtown narrow roads, Quincy formally requested the removal of SR 12 from Madison Street and East King Street.

== Major intersections ==
County	Location	mi	km	Destinations	Notes
Liberty	Bristol	0.000	0.000	SR 20 – Hosford, Blountstown	
Liberty		3.992	6.425	CR 270 north (Northwest Martin L. King Drive)	
Liberty		6.481	10.430	CR 1641 (Northwest Dempsey Barron Road / Northwest Torreya Park Road) – Torreya State Park, Liberty Correctional Institution	
Gadsden		13.386	21.543	CR 269 north (Pine Grove Church Road)	
Gadsden		15.725	25.307	CR 65D east (Telogia Creek Road)	
Gadsden		16.797	27.032	CR 379 north (Juniper Road)	
Gadsden	Greensboro	18.118	29.158	CR 270 west (Selman Street) – Chattahoochee	Western terminus of CR 270 overlap
Gadsden	Greensboro	18.290	29.435	CR 270 east (Tolar-White Road)	Eastern terminus of CR 270 overlap
Gadsden		18.688	30.075	CR 274 east (Providence Road)	Western terminus of CR 274
Gadsden		21.03	33.84	I-10 (SR 8) – Pensacola, Tallahassee	Exit 174 (I-10)
Gadsden		21.963	35.346	CR 270 east (Bassett Road)	
Gadsden		22.773	36.650	CR 270A west (Flat Creek Road)	
Gadsden		23.325	37.538	SR 65 south – Hosford	
Gadsden		23.51	37.84	CR 65A north (Dewey Johnson Way) – Gretna	
Gadsden	Douglas City	24.963	40.174	US 90 west (SR 10) – Gretna	West end of US 90 overlap
Gadsden		26.780	43.098	CR 274 west (Ben Bostick Road)	
Gadsden	Quincy	28.072	45.178	SR 267 south (Pat Thomas Parkway / CR 268 west) to I-10	West end of SR 267 overlap
Gadsden	Quincy	28.915	46.534	SR 267 north / CR 268 east (Adams Street) – Gadsden Technical Institute	East end of SR 267 overlap
Gadsden	Quincy	28.986	46.648	CR 65 (Madison Street)	Former SR 12 east
Gadsden	Quincy	30.989	49.872	US 90 east (East Jefferson Street / SR 10) / SR 269 begins – Tallahassee	East end of US 90 overlap; south end of SR 269 overlap
Gadsden	Quincy	32.527	52.347	SR 269 ends / East King Street	Former SR 12 west; north end of SR 269 overlap
Gadsden		33.474	53.871	CR 161 north (Point Milligan Road)	Southern terminus of CR 161
Gadsden	Shady Rest	36.836	59.282	CR 270 east (Shady Rest Road) – Tallahassee	
Gadsden		41.387	66.606	CR 159 north (Salem Road)	
Gadsden	Havana	41.552	66.871	SR 159 south – Tallahassee	
Gadsden	Havana	42.176	67.876	US 27 (Main Street / SR 63) / CR 12A east (9th Avenue)	
1.000 mi = 1.609 km; 1.000 km = 0.621 mi: Concurrency terminus

== Related routes ==
=== Liberty County ===
==== County Road 12 ====
County Road 12
- Location: Wilma–Bristol

County Road 12 is a county extension of SR 12. It begins at State Road 65 in Wilma and runs northwest to SR 20 in Bristol just west of the western terminus of SR 12.

==== County Road 12A ====
County Road 12A
- Location: South of Bristol

County Road 12A is a suffixed alternate of County Road 12 located South of Bristol. It is a loop road to the west of CR 12 around Lake Mystic, appropriately named Lake Mystic Road.

=== Gadsden and Leon counties ===
==== SR 269 ====
State Road 269
- Location: Quincy
- Length: 1.572 mi (2.530 km)
- Existed: 2015–present

State Road 269 (SR 269) is a 1.6-mile-long (2.6 km) two-lane state highway located east of downtown Quincy. Most of the roadway is within city limits though some portions are in unincorporated parts of Gadsden County. SR 269 runs from US 90/SR 10 and Ralph Strong Road north to East King Street and C&E Farm Road near the Quincy Municipal Airport. SR 12 runs concurrent with the entire length of SR 269. The road heads through forested land, crossing Quincy Creek towards the midpoint of the road, and has no driveways off of it. It is officially designed the Julia Munroe Woodward named for a longtime Quincy resident and philanthropist.

The road opened in January 2015 to help remove truck traffic on SR 12's narrow roads through Quincy. Since 2017, it is fully co-signed with SR 12 once the city took over maintenance from FDOT of SR 12 along Madison Street and East King Street.

==== County Road 12 ====
County Road 12
- Location: Havana–Iamonia

County Road 12 in Gadsden and Leon Counties is a bi-county extension of SR 12. The route begins three blocks north of the eastern terminus of State Road 12 at US 27 as Fifth Avenue East. Upon leaving the town limits it becomes Fairbanks Ferry Road, where it curves more toward the northeast until it encounters the eastern terminus of CR 12B. Entering Concord, the road intersects CR 157, a bi-county extension of SR 157 in Tallahassee. Further east it serves as the southern terminus of CR 157A. Upon crossing Fairbanks Ferry Bridge over the Ochlockonee River, the northernmost bridge along the river in Florida, the road enters Leon County. Fairbanks Ferry Road ends at CR 155, which it has a brief southbound concurrency with before turning east again. Along this segment, the route serves as the headquarters for WVUP-CD, a Christian television station. In Iamonia, CR 12 divides just before ending at US 319 and has its own median within the median of US 319.

==== County Road 12A ====
County Road 12A
- Location: Havana

County Road 12A is a suffixed alternate of State Road 12. It begins at the eastern terminus of SR 12 and ends at CR 157. It may have possibly had a concurrency with CR 157 leading to CR 12 in Concord at one time.

==== County Road 12B ====
County Road 12B
- Location: North of Havana

County Road 12B is another suffixed alternate of State Road 12. It begins at US 27 north of Havana and end at CR 12 west of CR 157 in Concord.
