= County Road 12 =

County Road 12 or County Route 12 may refer to:

- County Road 12 (Prince Edward County, Ontario)
- County Road 12 (Gadsden County, Florida)
- County Road 12 (Leon County, Florida)
- County Road 12 (Liberty County, Florida)
- County Road 12 (Cook County, Minnesota)
- County Road 12 (Goodhue County, Minnesota)
- County Road 12 (Hennepin County, Minnesota)
- County Road 12 (Washington County, Minnesota)
- County Route 12 (Monmouth County, New Jersey)
- County Route 12 (Allegany County, New York)
- County Route 12 (Cattaraugus County, New York)
- County Route 12 (Chemung County, New York)
- County Route 12 (Chenango County, New York)
- County Route 12 (Clinton County, New York)
- County Route 12 (Genesee County, New York)
- County Route 12 (Greene County, New York)
- County Route 12 (Jefferson County, New York)
- County Route 12 (Nassau County, New York)
- County Route 12 (Niagara County, New York)
- County Route 12 (Onondaga County, New York)
- County Route 12 (Otsego County, New York)
- County Route 12 (Putnam County, New York)
- County Route 12 (Schuyler County, New York)
- County Route 12 (St. Lawrence County, New York)
- County Route 12 (Steuben County, New York)
- County Route 12 (Suffolk County, New York)
- County Route 12 (Ulster County, New York)
- County Route 12 (Warren County, New York)
