= Oak Grove, Gadsden County, Florida =

Oak Grove, Florida
- Unincorporated community
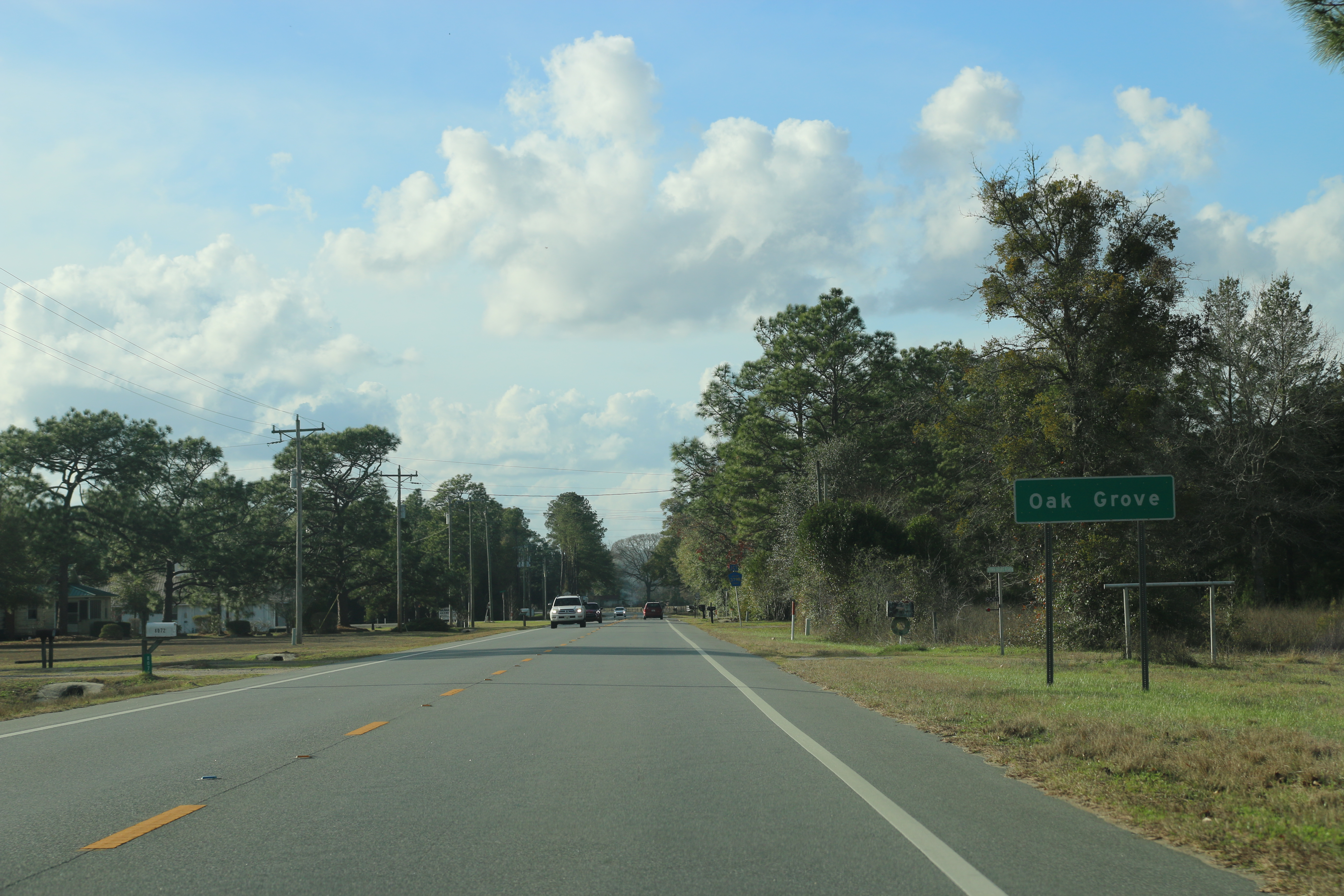
- Sign for Oak Grove on U.S. Route 90

- Location within Florida
- Coordinates: 30°41′31″N 84°44′00″W
- Country: United States
- State: Florida
- County: Gadsden
- Elevation: 285 ft (87 m)
- Time zone: UTC-5 (Eastern (EST))
  - Summer (DST): UTC-4 (EDT)
- Area code: 850
- GNIS feature ID: 287934

Oak Grove is an unincorporated community in Gadsden County, Florida, United States. It is located near the intersection of Memorial Blue Star Highway and Smithtown Road, northwest of Mount Pleasant, Florida.
