= Kelvin Kirk =

American football player (1953–2003)

No. 14
- Position: Wide receiver

Personal information
- Born: December 31, 1953; Mount Pleasant, Florida, U.S.
- Died: July 2, 2003 (aged 49); Ottawa, Ontario, Canada
- Listed height: 5 ft 10 in (1.78 m)
- Listed weight: 180 lb (82 kg)

Career information
- High school: Dayton (OH) Dunbar
- College: Dayton
- NFL draft: 1976: 17th round, 487th overall pick

Career history
- 1977: Toronto Argonauts
- 1978–1979: Calgary Stampeders
- 1979: Saskatchewan Roughriders
- 1980: Calgary Stampeders
- 1981–1983: Ottawa Rough Riders

Career CFL statistics
- Receptions: 153
- Receiving yards: 2,942
- Return yards: 3,600
- Total Touchdowns: 20

Kelvin Kirk (December 31, 1953 – July 2, 2003) was an American professional football wide receiver and kick returner who played for seven seasons in the Canadian Football League (CFL). Kirk was also the first Mr. Irrelevant (a humorous award given to the last player picked in the NFL draft), as the 487th and last draft pick in the 1976 NFL draft, which famously had the most players selected in any draft in NFL history. Kirk, being the last one selected, has since become the "most irrelevant" draft pick in NFL history.

== Early life ==
Born in Mount Pleasant, Florida, Kirk's family relocated to Dayton, Ohio and he starred at Dunbar High School. Kirk remained in town to play college football at the University of Dayton, where he led the nation with 24.5 yards per reception in 1975.

=== "Mr. Irrelevant" ===
Kirk was drafted by the defending Super Bowl champion Pittsburgh Steelers in the seventeenth and final round of the 1976 NFL draft, making him the first Mr. Irrelevant of the NFL draft, an "honor" afforded the last player picked in the draft. Kirk was the last of 487 selections, the most ever made in an NFL draft.

== Professional career ==
After being cut by the Steelers, Kirk headed north to play in the Canadian Football League; he wound up spending seven seasons (1977–83) in the CFL, playing with the Toronto Argonauts, Calgary Stampeders, Saskatchewan Roughriders and Ottawa Rough Riders. He compiled over 6,500 yards in Canada as a wide receiver (153 catches for 2,942 yards and 16 touchdowns), punt returner (1,678 yards and 2 TD) and kickoff returner (1,922 yards and a touchdown).

Following his career in the CFL, Kirk worked as an artist for the Ottawa Citizen before his sudden death by heart attack while playing a pick-up game of basketball in 2003. Kirk was 49.
