= Dogtown, Florida =

- Unincorporated community
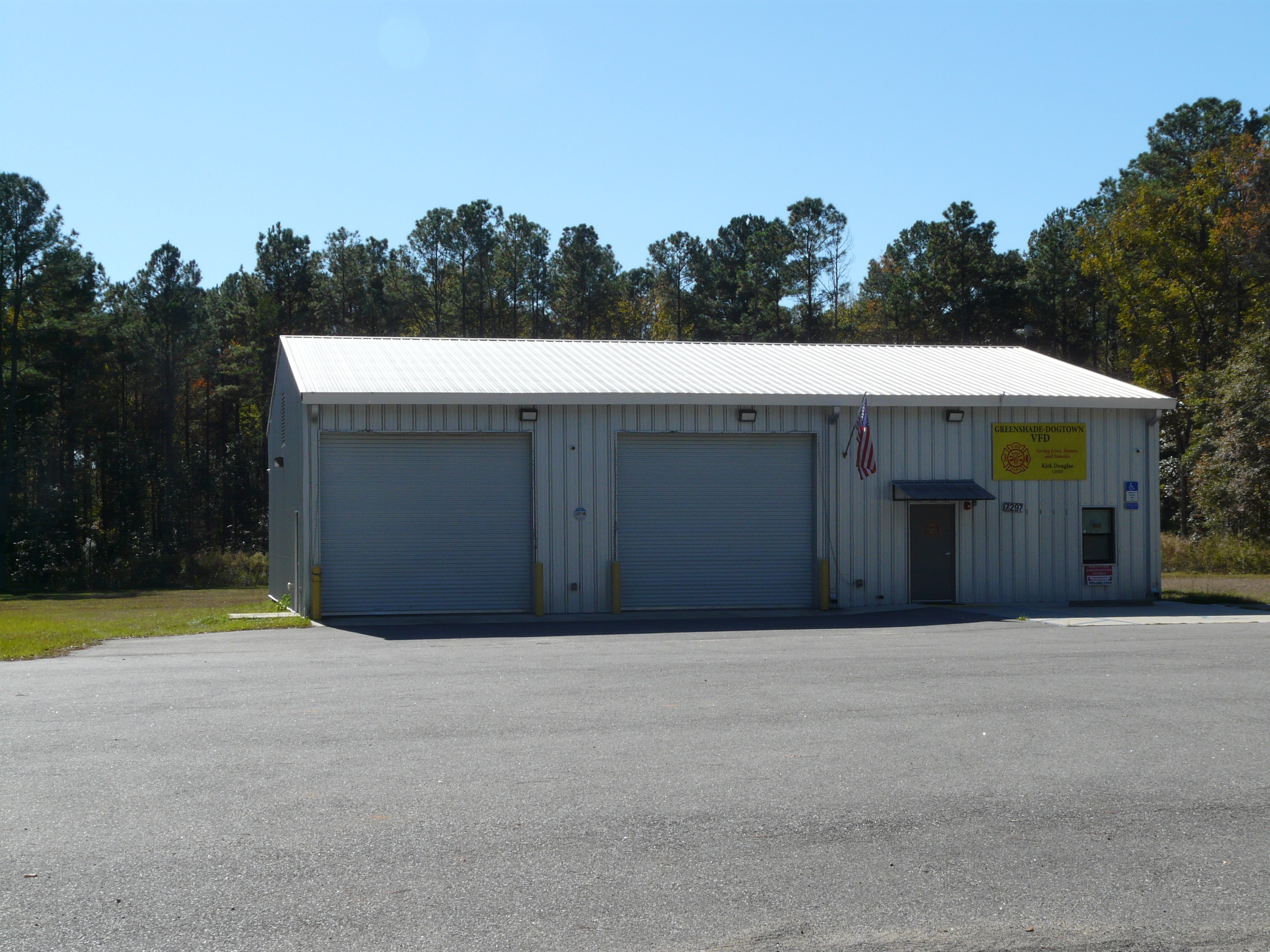
- Greenshade-Dogtown Volunteer Fire Department

- Location in Florida and the United States Dogtown, Florida (the United States)
- Coordinates: 30°40′44″N 84°30′12″W
- Country: United States
- State: Florida
- County: Gadsden
- Elevation: 292 ft (89 m)
- Time zone: UTC-5 (Eastern (EST))
  - Summer (DST): UTC-4 (EDT)
- GNIS feature ID: 295245

Dogtown is an unincorporated community in Gadsden County, Florida, United States. It is located 1.3 mi (2.1 km) south of the Florida-Georgia state line, along County Road 159.

A portion of a geologic clay formation found in North Florida called the Torreya Formation is exposed near Dogtown, and two mines were located there. The Douglas Owens Mine, as well as the La Camelia Mine, owned by Engelhard Minerals and Chemicals Corporation, mined resources from an outcrop of the Torreya Formation known as the "Dogtown Member". Fossils of Carcharodon hastalis, a shark which existed from the early Miocene through early-late Pliocene (about 20 to 3 million years ago), have been found at the La Camelia Mine.

The Greenshade African Methodist Episcopal Church is located on County Road 159 in Dogtown, and the Owens Cemetery is located along Dogtown Road.
