= 1984 United States presidential election in Florida =

- November 6, 1984
- Turnout: ▼75%

Nominee	Ronald Reagan	Walter Mondale
Party	Republican	Democratic
Home state	California	Minnesota
Running mate	George H. W. Bush	Geraldine Ferraro
Electoral vote	21	0
Popular vote	2,730,350	1,448,816
Percentage	65.32%	34.66%
County results
Reagan
50–60%
60–70%
70–80%
80–90%
Mondale
50–60%
President before election
Ronald Reagan
Republican
Elected President
Ronald Reagan
Republican

The 1984 United States presidential election in Florida took place on November 6, 1984. All fifty states and the District of Columbia were part of the 1984 United States presidential election. Florida voters chose 21 electors to the Electoral College, which selected the president and vice president of the United States.

Florida was won by incumbent President Ronald Reagan of California, running with Vice President George H. W. Bush, against former Vice President Walter Mondale, running with U.S. Representative Geraldine Ferraro.

Among white voters, 71% supported Reagan while 29% supported Mondale.

== Results ==
=== Primary election results ===
==== Republican ====
Ronald Reagan faced no opposition in the Florida primaries.

1984 Florida Republican presidential primary results
Candidate	Votes received	
Candidate	#	%
Ronald Reagan (incumbent)	344,150	100%
Total	344,150	100%

==== Democratic ====
1984 Florida Democratic presidential primary results
Candidate	Votes received	
Candidate	#	%
Gary Hart	463,799	39.2%
Walter Mondale	394,350	33.4%
Jesse Jackson	144,229	12.2%
John Glenn	128,154	10.8%
Reubin Askew	26,330	2.2%
George McGovern	17,614	1.5%
Fritz Hollings	3,115	0.3%
Alan Cranston	2,097	0.2%
Richard B. Kay	1,328	0.1%
Stephen A. Koczak	1,157	0.1%
Total	1,182,173	100%

=== General election results ===
1984 United States presidential election in Florida
Party	Candidate	Votes	Percentage	Electoral votes
Republican	Ronald Reagan (incumbent)	2,730,350	65.32%	21
Democratic	Walter Mondale	1,448,816	34.66%	0
Libertarian	David Bergland (write-in)	754	0.02%	0
Other write-ins		141	>0.01%	0
Totals		4,180,051	100.0%	21

==== Results by county ====
County	Ronald Reagan Republican		Walter Mondale Democratic		Various candidates Write-ins		Margin		Total
County	#	%	#	%	#	%	#	%	Total
Alachua	30,609	53.46%	26,584	46.43%	60	0.10%	4,025	7.03%	57,253
Baker	3,485	71.62%	1,381	28.38%			2,104	43.24%	4,866
Bay	29,356	75.77%	9,384	24.22%	4	0.01%	19,972	51.55%	38,744
Bradford	4,130	63.82%	2,341	36.18%			1,789	27.64%	6,471
Brevard	102,477	73.45%	36,985	26.51%	49	0.04%	65,492	46.94%	139,511
Broward	254,608	56.68%	194,584	43.32%	34	0.01%	60,024	13.36%	449,226
Calhoun	2,493	65.48%	1,312	34.46%	2	0.05%	1,181	31.02%	3,807
Charlotte	27,486	70.85%	11,305	29.14%	2	0.01%	16,181	41.71%	38,793
Citrus	20,764	66.47%	10,468	33.51%	4	0.01%	10,296	32.96%	31,236
Clay	21,571	79.72%	5,489	20.28%			16,082	59.44%	27,060
Collier	33,619	78.75%	9,067	21.24%	5	0.01%	24,552	57.51%	42,691
Columbia	8,814	67.41%	4,261	32.59%			4,553	34.82%	13,075
Dade	324,414	59.17%	223,863	40.83%	35	0.01%	100,551	18.34%	548,312
DeSoto	4,822	67.64%	2,304	32.32%	3	0.04%	2,518	35.32%	7,129
Dixie	2,204	64.29%	1,224	35.71%			980	28.58%	3,428
Duval	128,724	62.41%	77,488	37.57%	37	0.02%	51,236	24.84%	206,249
Escambia	66,715	71.32%	26,812	28.66%	22	0.02%	39,903	42.66%	93,549
Flagler	4,913	62.08%	3,000	37.91%	1	0.01%	1,913	24.17%	7,914
Franklin	2,218	67.05%	1,090	32.95%			1,128	34.10%	3,308
Gadsden	5,807	43.95%	7,403	56.03%	2	0.02%	-1,596	-12.08%	13,212
Gilchrist	2,056	66.15%	1,051	33.82%	1	0.03%	1,005	32.33%	3,108
Glades	1,987	65.00%	1,070	35.00%			917	30.00%	3,057
Gulf	3,573	66.70%	1,784	33.30%			1,789	33.40%	5,357
Hamilton	1,921	57.83%	1,401	42.17%			520	15.66%	3,322
Hardee	3,962	72.06%	1,536	27.94%			2,426	44.12%	5,498
Hendry	4,524	69.15%	2,018	30.85%			2,506	38.30%	6,542
Hernando	21,279	63.54%	12,204	36.44%	4	0.01%	9,075	27.10%	33,487
Highlands	16,474	69.53%	7,217	30.46%	3	0.01%	9,257	39.07%	23,694
Hillsborough	157,926	64.67%	86,230	35.31%	52	0.02%	71,696	29.36%	244,208
Holmes	4,548	78.70%	1,231	21.30%			3,317	57.40%	5,779
Indian River	23,716	73.08%	8,736	26.92%			14,980	46.16%	32,452
Jackson	9,091	64.70%	4,960	35.30%			4,131	29.40%	14,051
Jefferson	2,244	52.16%	2,057	47.81%	1	0.02%	187	4.35%	4,302
Lafayette	1,513	63.71%	862	36.29%			651	27.42%	2,375
Lake	35,319	74.29%	12,217	25.70%	7	0.01%	23,102	48.59%	47,543
Lee	85,024	73.89%	30,022	26.09%	30	0.03%	55,002	47.80%	115,076
Leon	36,325	55.00%	29,683	44.94%	38	0.06%	6,642	10.06%	66,046
Levy	5,561	64.19%	3,103	35.81%			2,458	28.38%	8,664
Liberty	1,410	68.45%	650	31.55%			760	36.90%	2,060
Madison	2,819	57.30%	2,101	42.70%			718	14.60%	4,920
Manatee	55,793	72.75%	20,889	27.24%	6	0.01%	34,904	45.51%	76,688
Marion	37,815	69.97%	16,225	30.02%	6	0.01%	21,590	39.95%	54,046
Martin	28,900	76.28%	8,978	23.70%	9	0.02%	19,922	52.58%	37,887
Monroe	16,332	67.73%	7,774	32.24%	9	0.04%	8,558	35.49%	24,115
Nassau	8,039	69.76%	3,484	30.23%	1	0.01%	4,555	39.53%	11,524
Okaloosa	37,044	83.51%	7,304	16.47%	9	0.02%	29,740	67.04%	44,357
Okeechobee	4,449	66.65%	2,226	33.35%			2,223	33.30%	6,675
Orange	122,068	71.39%	48,752	28.51%	165	0.10%	73,316	42.88%	170,985
Osceola	18,348	73.45%	6,628	26.53%	4	0.02%	11,720	46.92%	24,980
Palm Beach	186,811	61.67%	116,091	38.32%	29	0.01%	70,720	23.35%	302,931
Pasco	66,618	61.92%	40,962	38.07%	8	0.01%	25,656	23.85%	107,588
Pinellas	240,612	65.16%	128,574	34.82%	63	0.02%	112,038	30.34%	369,249
Polk	84,246	70.33%	35,516	29.65%	22	0.02%	48,730	40.68%	119,784
Putnam	11,435	59.37%	7,823	40.61%	4	0.02%	3,612	18.76%	19,262
St. Johns	16,500	71.26%	6,652	28.73%	2	0.01%	9,848	42.53%	23,154
St. Lucie	28,200	68.37%	13,040	31.61%	7	0.02%	15,160	36.76%	41,247
Santa Rosa	21,265	82.04%	4,649	17.94%	6	0.02%	16,616	64.10%	25,920
Sarasota	87,771	74.15%	30,525	25.79%	69	0.06%	57,246	48.36%	118,365
Seminole	56,244	75.91%	17,795	24.02%	53	0.07%	38,449	51.89%	74,092
Sumter	6,255	64.37%	3,461	35.62%	1	0.01%	2,794	28.75%	9,717
Suwannee	6,082	68.57%	2,788	31.43%			3,294	37.14%	8,870
Taylor	4,038	69.98%	1,732	30.02%			2,306	39.96%	5,770
Union	1,804	70.28%	761	29.65%	2	0.08%	1,043	40.63%	2,567
Volusia	68,358	60.93%	43,820	39.06%	13	0.01%	24,538	21.87%	112,191
Wakulla	3,088	67.75%	1,470	32.25%			1,618	35.50%	4,558
Walton	7,126	74.01%	2,503	25.99%			4,623	48.02%	9,629
Washington	4,608	70.62%	1,916	29.36%	1	0.02%	2,692	41.26%	6,525
Totals	2,730,350	65.32%	1,448,816	34.66%	885	0.02%	1,281,534	30.66%	4,180,051

==== Counties that flipped from Democratic to Republican ====
- Alachua
- Baker
- Bradford
- Calhoun
- Columbia
- Dixie
- Franklin
- Gilchrist
- Glades
- Gulf
- Hamilton
- Jackson
- Jefferson
- Lafayette
- Leon
- Levy
- Liberty
- Madison
- Okeechobee
- Putnam
- Sumter
- Suwannee
- Taylor
- Union
- Wakulla

== See also ==
- Presidency of Ronald Reagan

== Works cited ==
- Black, Earl; Black, Merle (1992). The Vital South: How Presidents Are Elected. Harvard University Press. ISBN 0674941306.
