= Reston, Florida =

Unincorporated community in Florida, U.S.

Coordinates: 30.5939°N 84.4455°W

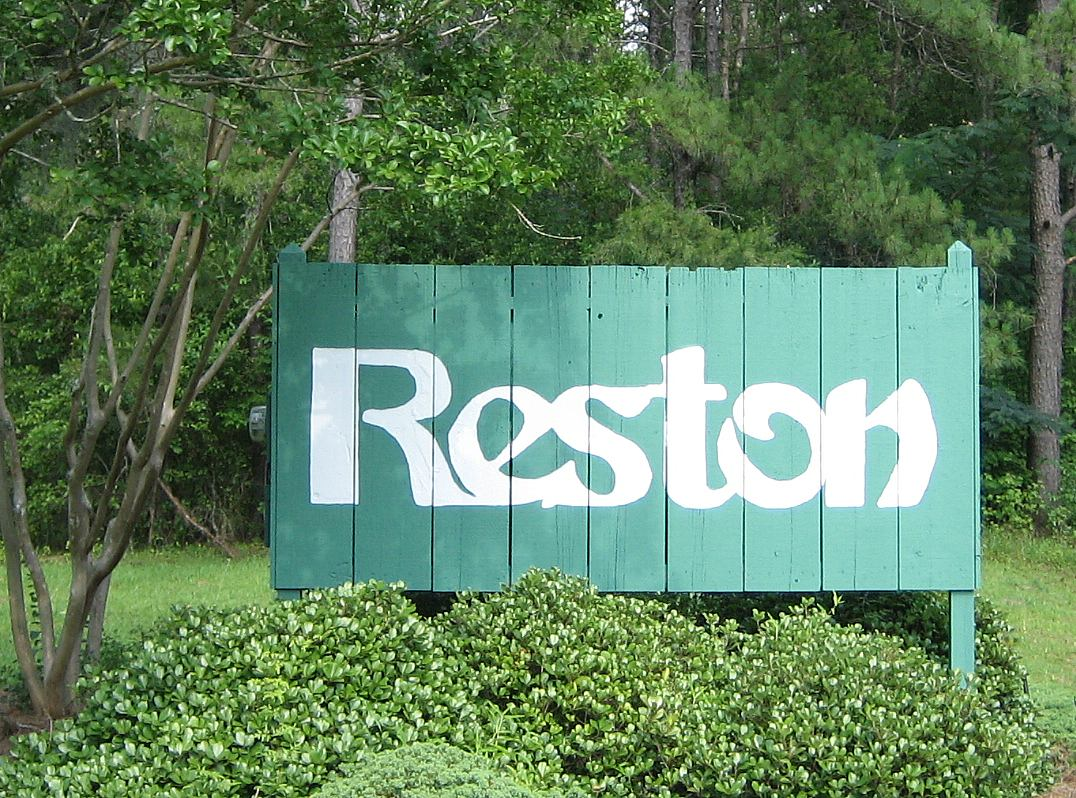
Entrance to Reston, Florida

Reston is an unincorporated community in Gadsden County, Florida, United States. It includes more than 100 homes. Development is guided by the Homeowners' Association of Reston, Inc.
