= St. Hebron, Florida =

Unincorporated community in Florida, U.S.

Coordinates: 30°38′51″N 84°25′00″W

St. Hebron is a small unincorporated community in Gadsden County, Florida, United States, which borders St. John, Scottown and Havana. St. Hebron, along with its neighboring communities, is located on the outside of the city limits of Quincy, between Quincy and Havana.
