= Saddlebag Lake Resort =

Saddlebag Lake, Florida Saddlebag Lake Resort
- Retirement Community/Resort
- Interactive map of Saddlebag Lake, Florida
- Country: United States
- State: Florida
- County: Polk

Population
  - Total: 200−1,350
- Time zone: UTC-5 (Eastern (EST))
  - Summer (DST): UTC-4 (EDT)
- ZIP codes: 33898
- Area code: 863

Saddlebag Lake Resort is a snowbird subdivision near the outskirts of Lake Wales, Florida in Polk County. The population ranges from a full-time resident population of 200 to a seasonal snowbird population of around 1,350. There is a sizeable Canadian snowbird population. There are 787 homesites. The park is 9 miles west of Lake Wales, Florida in unincorporated Polk County.

== History ==
Saddlebag Lake Resort was platted in 1973 by two investors after trying to find a lake to fish in for the summer. The brothers bought more than 100 acres from the state and invested in a Campground and sold campsites to campers. Although sold as campsites, the lots were approved in 1994 to site manufactured homes. As of 2015, most of the developed sites house trailers/roofovers. There is a significant recreational infrastructure including clubhouse, billiards, pool, tennis, horseshoe, driving range, and boat dock.
