= Florida State Road 159 =

State highway in Florida, United States

State Road 159

Route information
- Maintained by FDOT
- Length: 0.450 mi (724 m)

Major junctions
- South end: US 27 in Havana
- North end: SR 12 in Havana

Location
- Country: United States
- State: Florida
- Counties: Gadsden

Highway system
- Florida State Highway System; Interstate; US; State; Former; Pre‑1945; Toll; Scenic
← SR 157	→ SR 160

State Road 159 (SR 159) is a short north–south road that serves as a southwestern bypass of Havana in Gadsden County between SR 12 and U.S. Route 27 (US 27).

The road continues north as County Road 159 (CR 159) to the Georgia border, where it becomes State Route 309. Another segment of County Road 159 can be found between US 90 near Midway and US 27 north of Scotland.

== Route description ==
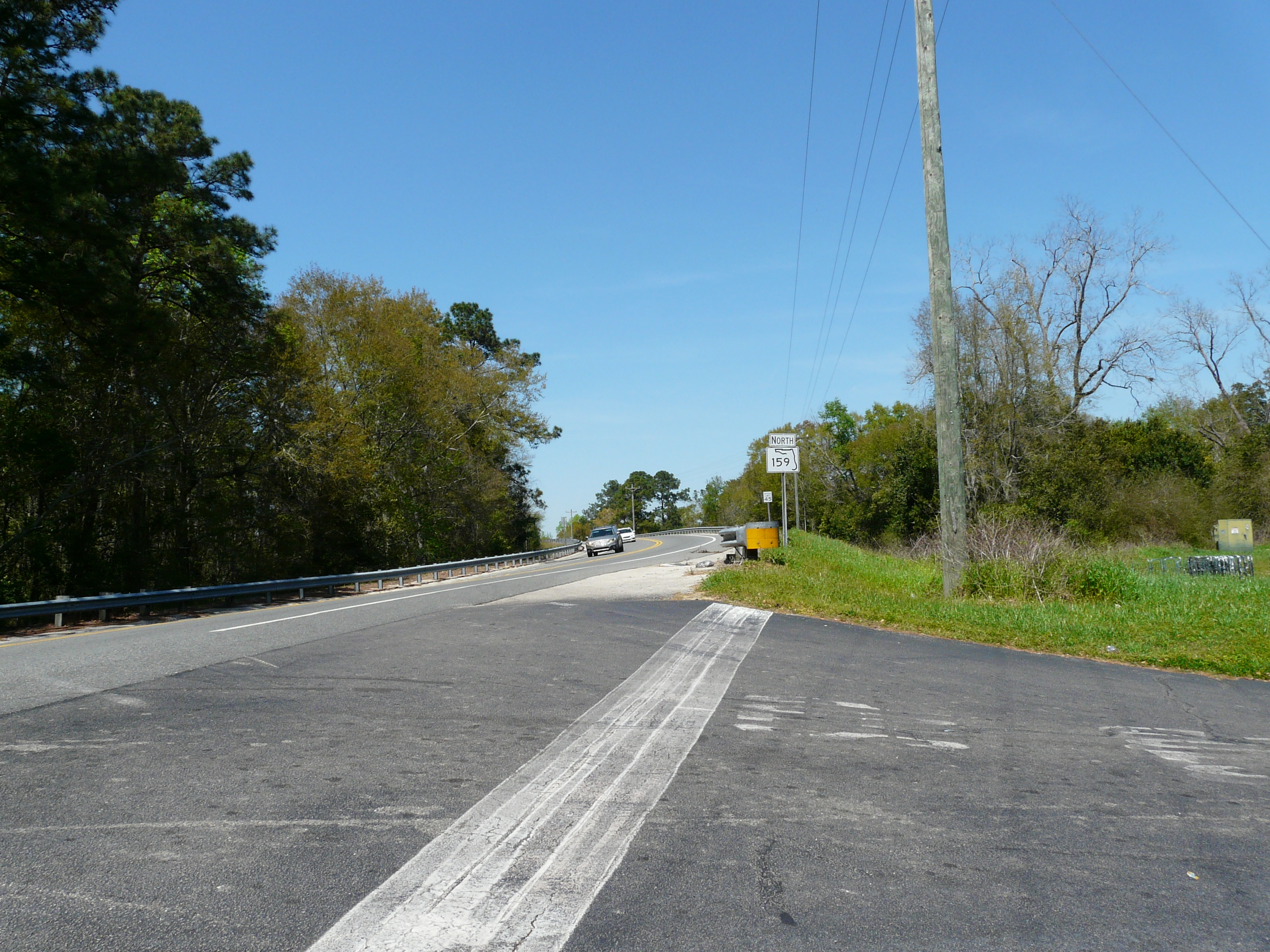
Northbound FL-159

The highway begins at an intersection with US 27 southwest of downtown Havana. Immediately after the intersection there is a driveway for a store. The two-lane road makes a slight curve to the northwest crossing over a railroad. SR 159 ends shortly thereafter at a stop intersection with SR 12 across the street from a nursery.

== Major intersections ==
The entire route is in Havana, Gadsden County.

mi	km	Destinations	Notes
0.000	0.000	US 27 (SR 63) – Bainbridge, Tallahassee	
0.450	0.724	SR 12	
1.000 mi = 1.609 km; 1.000 km = 0.621 mi
