= Wetumpka, Florida =

Unincorporated community in Florida, U.S.

- Unincorporated community
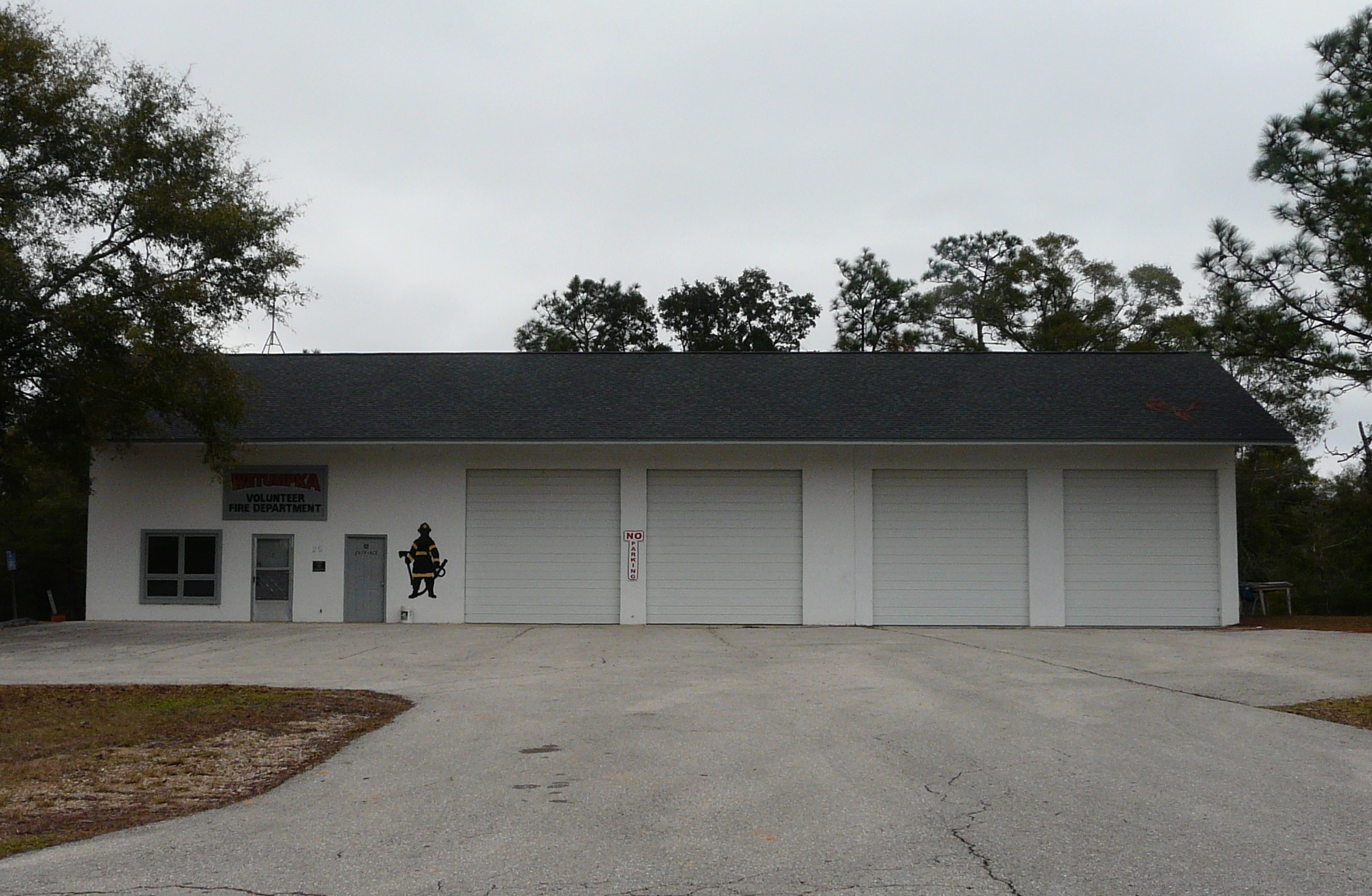
- Wetumptka Volunteer Fire Department

- Location in Florida and the United States Wetumpka, Florida (the United States)
- Coordinates: 30°28′59″N 84°37′23″W
- Country: United States
- State: Florida
- County: Gadsden
- Elevation: 194 ft (59 m)
- Time zone: UTC-5 (Eastern (EST))
  - Summer (DST): UTC-4 (EDT)
- GNIS feature ID: 306585

Wetumpka is an unincorporated community in Gadsden County, in the U.S. state of Florida.

== History ==
A post office called Wetumpka was established in 1873, and remained in operation until 1918. Wetumpka is a name derived from the Creek language meaning "tumbling water".

== Government and infrastructure ==
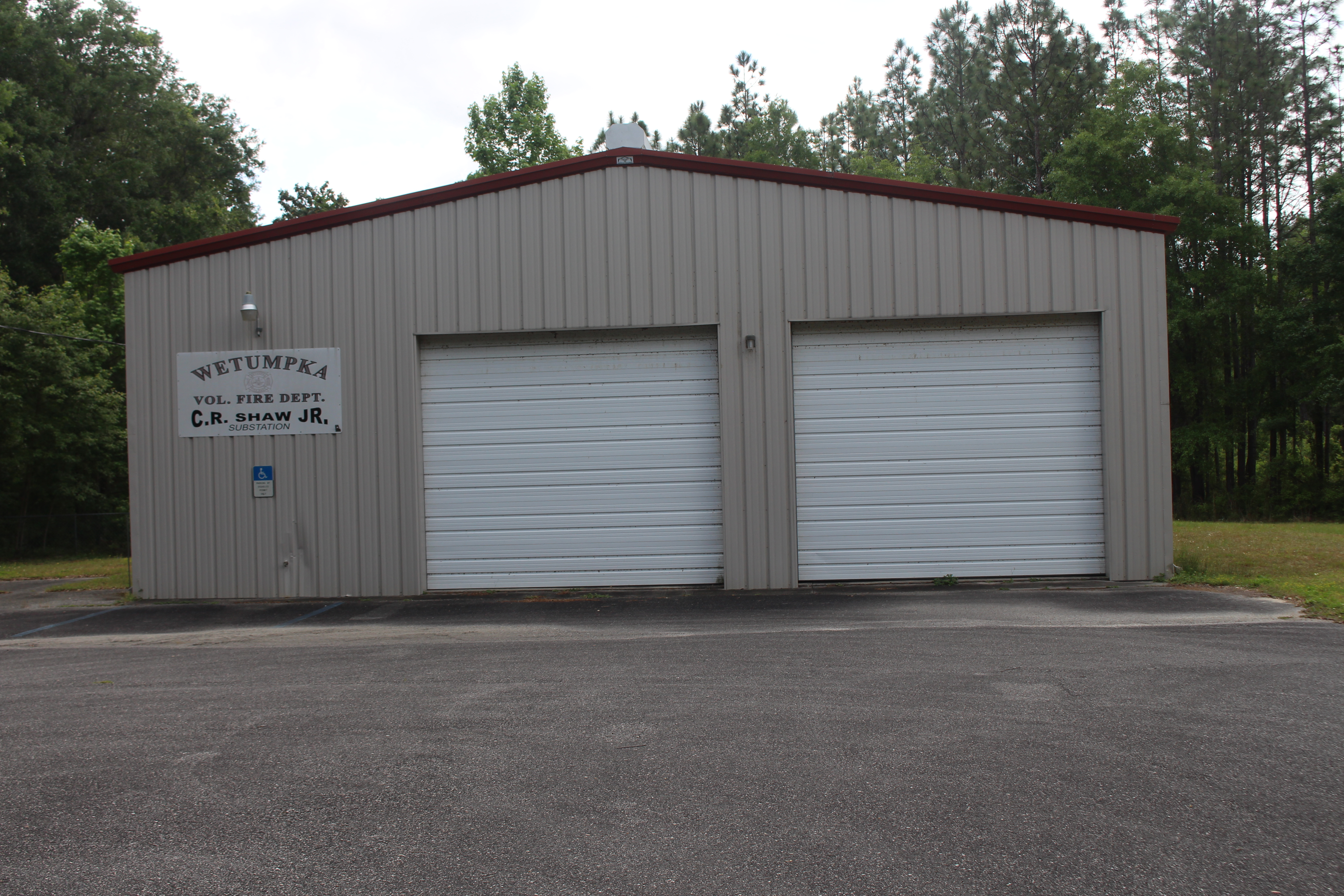
Wetumpka Fire Station #2

The Wetumpka Volunteer Fire Department operates two fire stations.

== Education ==
Gadsden County School District operates public schools. As of 2017 Gadsden County High School (formerly East Gadsden High School) is the only remaining zoned high school in the county due to the consolidation of West Gadsden High School's high school section into East Gadsden High.
