= Scottown, Florida =

Unincorporated community in Florida, U.S.

Coordinates: 30°34′36″N 84°25′49″W

Scottown is a small unincorporated community in Gadsden County, Florida, United States. Scottown is located along Shady Rest Road and borders the St. John community.
