= Gadsden County Public Library System =

Coordinates: 30.5764°N 84.5926°W

The Gadsden County Public Library System is a public library system in rural Northwest Florida that serves the residents of Quincy, Havana, Chattahoochee, Gretna, Midway, and Greensboro. The library system has three locations and a bookmobile that serves the entire county.

== Locations ==
The Gadsden County Public Library System consists of three locations and one county wide bookmobile. The main library is in Quincy, with branch locations in Chattahoochee and Havana.

Name	Address
William A. "Bill" McGill Public Library	732 South Pat Thomas Parkway Quincy, FL 32351.
Cowen Public Library	300 Maple Street Chattahoochee, FL 32324
Havana Public Library	203 E. Fifth Avenue Havana, FL 32333

== History ==
The library system described itself as a 25-year-old system in 2009. Gadsden County, however, has a long history of municipal and subscription public library service, dating back at least to the early 1900s.

One predecessor of the current library system was the Quincy Library, listed on the U.S. National Register of Historic Places, which was opened in 1931 in the former Quincy Academy by the Quincy Women's Library Club and which operated until at least 1973. The Quincy Women's Library Club was the main provider of library services in the county through its subscription library, along with a small library in Chattahoochee.

In 1979, the Board of County Commissioners voted to create a public library system. The Women's Club donated their library to the county, leasing the former Academy building to them to ease the transfer. The public library officially opened in 1980, after the Academy building underwent some renovations.

The small library in Chattahoochee would be signed over to the county, it would go through some renovations before re-opening as a branch library. The county would also lease a small storefront in Havana and would open a new branch library in this location in April 1980.

The Quincy library would move locations in 1987, from the Academy building to a downtown location shared with a branch of the Tallahassee Community College (TCC), serving both as a public library and a branch library for the college. After the TCC moved from the location, the library would go on to share the space with the Sheriff's Office and the County Justice Complex. In 2006, the main library location would move to the newly built McGill Library. The Havana branch would move to a larger rented location in 1990, remaining there until a new library location was built in 2003. The Chattahoochee branch would be renovated in 1998 remaining in its original location until 2007, when a new library building was created for it.

== Services ==
A library card is free to residents of Gadsden County, and to those employed there. Library privilege lasts four years, and it is free to renew it. Applicants must provide photo identification and proof of residency. A parent or guardian must sign a statement of responsibility for children 17 and under. If a library account is inactive for four years then it will be deleted from the system unless there are fines attached to the account. A lost library card can be replaced for a $1.00 fee.

In addition to books, audiobooks, and DVDs, downloadable materials are available via services such as Axis 360, Tumblebooks, and Book Flix. Free wifi is available in the libraries, as well as public access to computers, meeting rooms, and self-service copy machines. The library promotes programs and events for adults and for youth throughout the year, including computer classes. LVA-Gadsden, Inc., is housed by the library and offers basic tutoring, ESL, computer literacy, and GED instruction.
