= Mount Pleasant, Florida =

Unincorporated community in Florida, U.S.

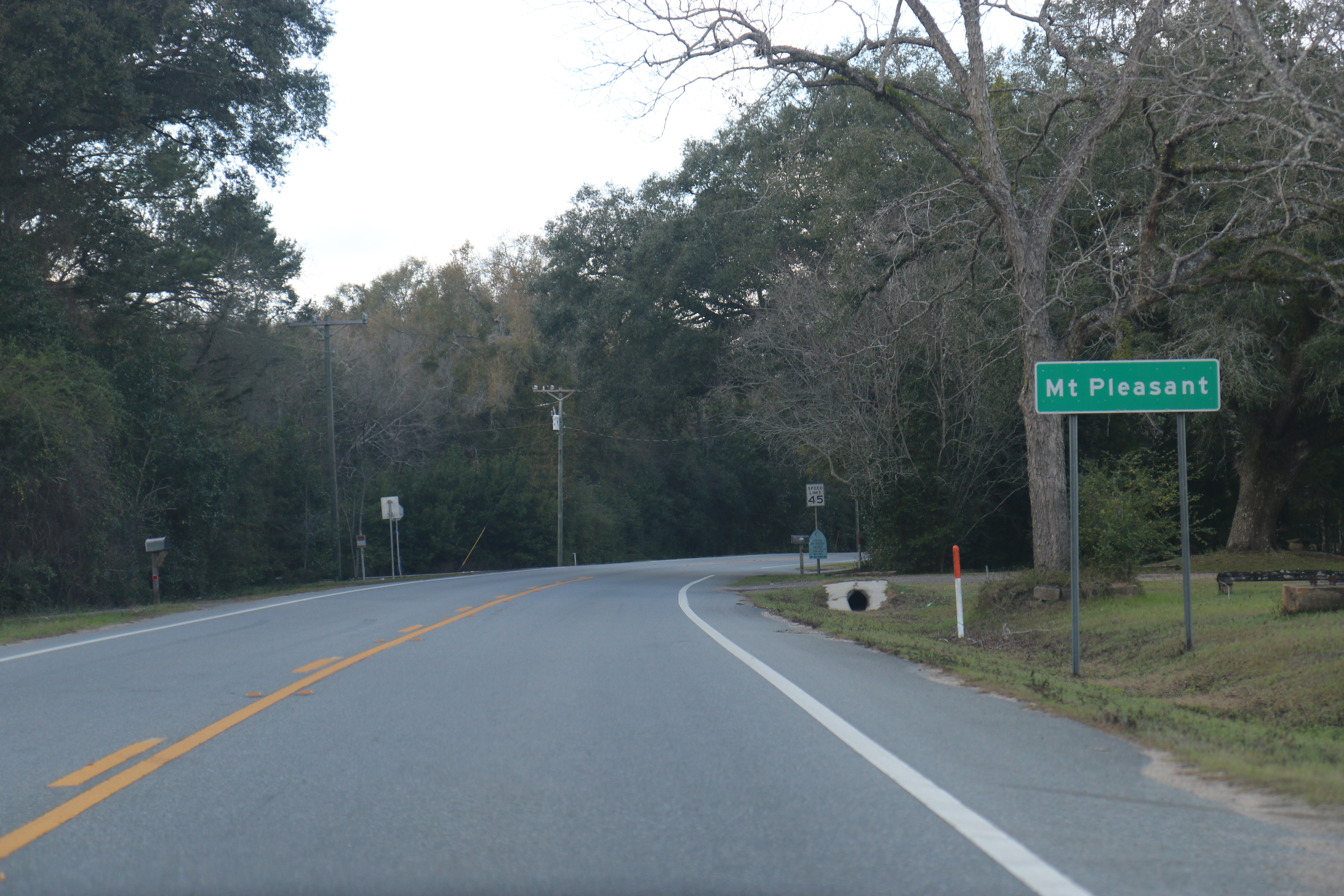
Sign for Mount Pleasant

Mount Pleasant is an unincorporated community in Gadsden County, Florida, United States. It is located near the intersection of Blue Star Memorial Highway and Mt. Pleasant Road. Mt. Pleasant borders the city of Gretna and the St. John/Robertsville community. It also borders the city of Chattahoochee.

== Geography ==
Mount Pleasant is located at 30°39′26″N 84°41′28″W (30.65722, -84.69111).

== Government and infrastructure ==
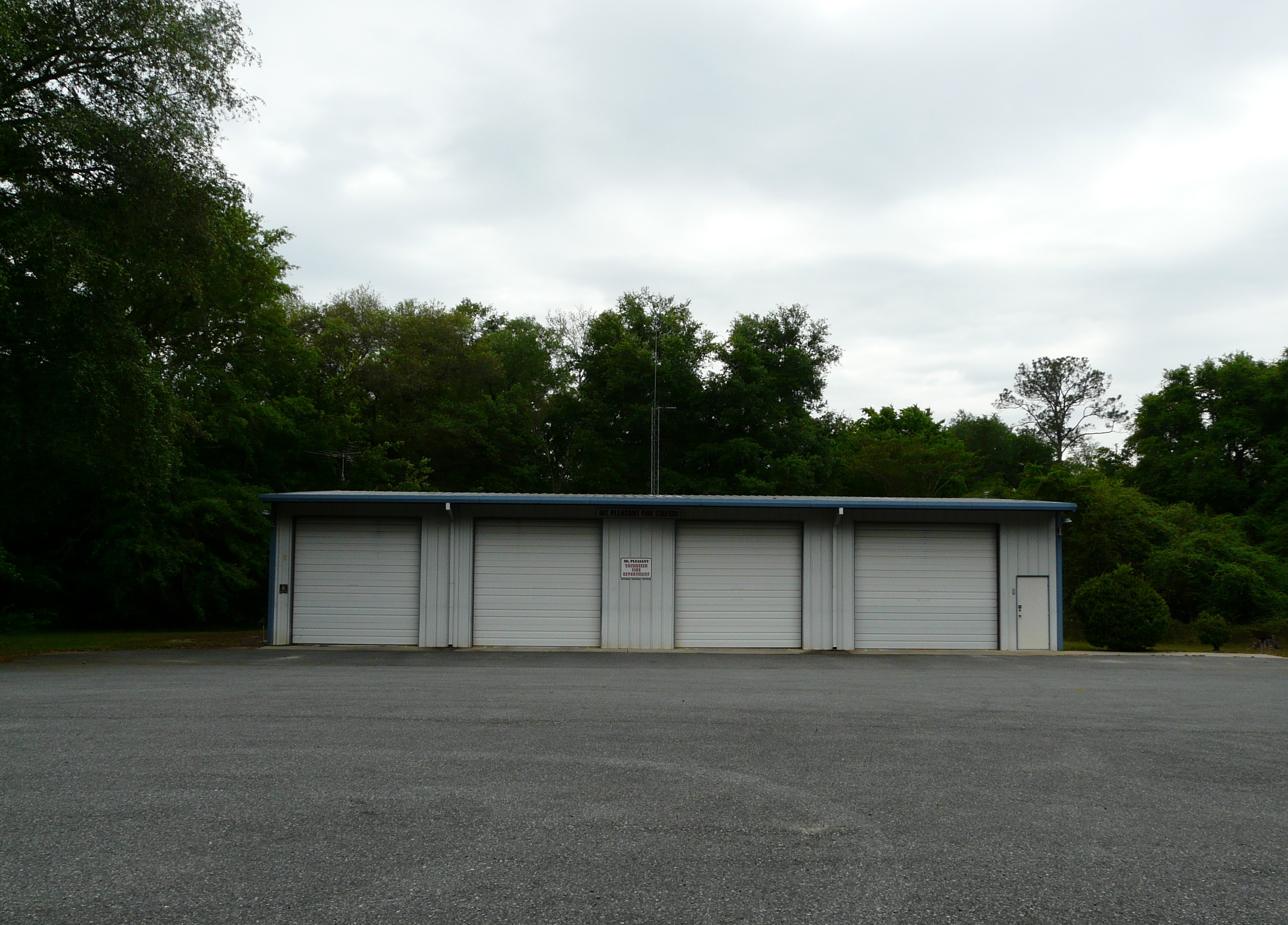
Mt. Pleasant VFD

The Mt. Pleasant Volunteer Fire Department operates one fire station.

== Education ==
Gadsden County School District operates public schools. At one time there was a county school in Mount Pleasant. As of 2017 Gadsden County High School (formerly East Gadsden High School) is the only remaining zoned high school in the county due to the consolidation of West Gadsden High School's high school section into East Gadsden High.

Robert F. Munroe Day School, a K-12 private school which was founded as a segregation academy, has its athletic fields in Mount Pleasant, and formerly had its main campus in Mount Pleasant. The main campus had 20 acres (8.1 ha) of land. In 2021 the school moved to another part of the county. After the move, the school continued to use the sports fields in the former Mount Pleasant campus. The school's kindergarten campus is in Quincy proper.

== Notable person ==
Kelvin Kirk, the first Mr. Irrelevant as the last player selected in the 1976 NFL draft, who later played seven seasons in the Canadian Football League.
