= Lake Tallavana, Florida =

Former community in Florida, U.S.

Coordinates: 30.597866°N 84.463271°W

Lake Tallavana is an unincorporated logging community located two miles (3 km) west of Havana on Highway 12 in Gadsden County, Florida, United States.

A 40-acre (16 ha) lake, Pine Top Lake, was enlarged to 160 acres (65 ha) and renamed Lake Tallavana.
