= Gadsden County, Florida =

County in Florida, United States

- County
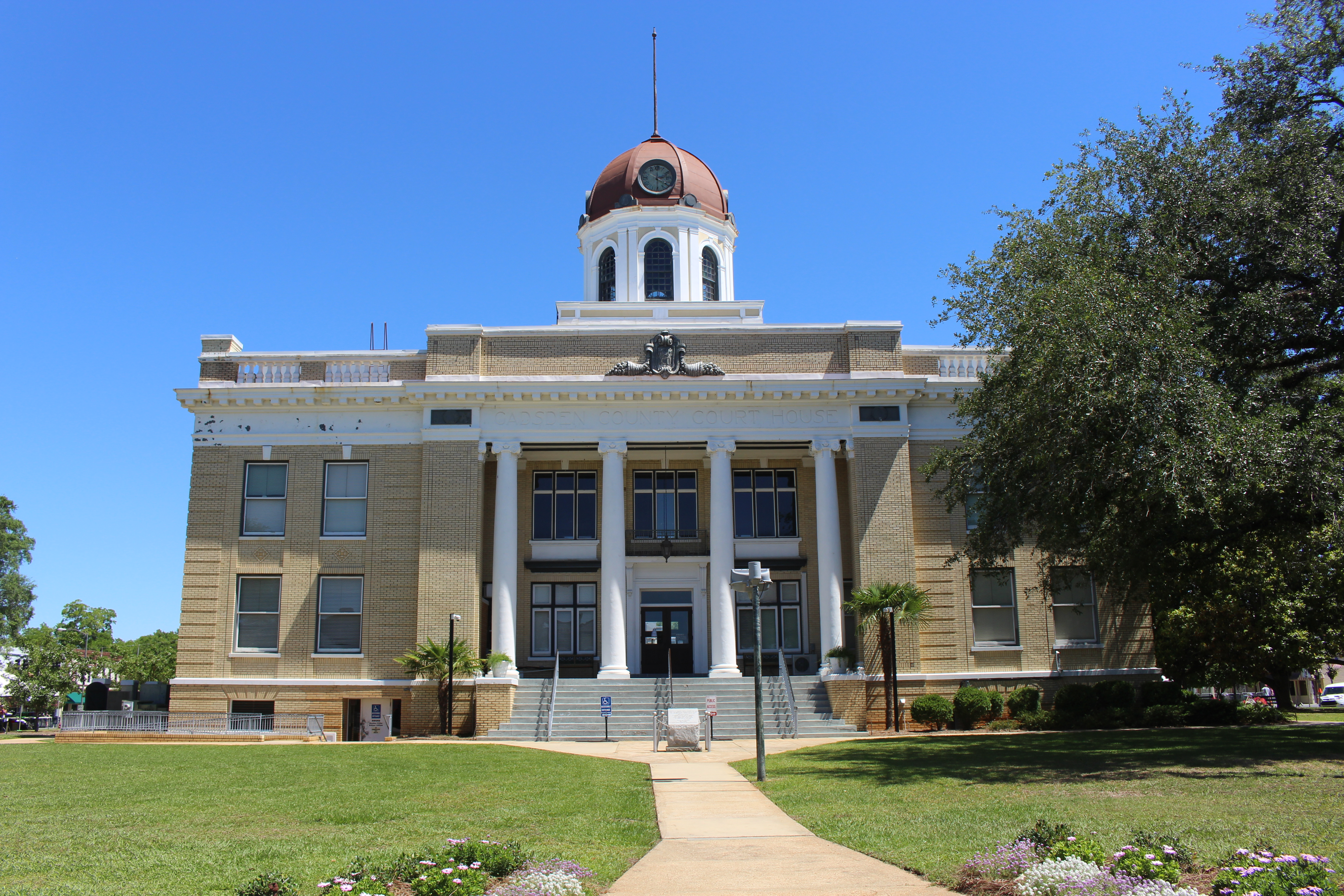
- Gadsden County Courthouse

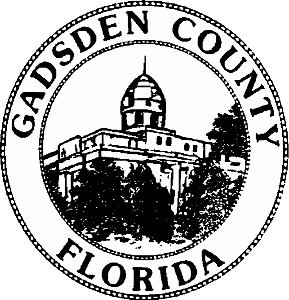
- Seal

- Location within the U.S. state of Florida
- Coordinates: 30°35′N 84°37′W
- Country: United States
- State: Florida
- Founded: June 24, 1823
- Named for: James Gadsden
- Seat: Quincy
- Largest city: Quincy

Area
  - Total: 529 sq mi (1,370 km^{2})
  - Land: 516 sq mi (1,340 km^{2})
  - Water: 12 sq mi (31 km^{2}) 2.3%

Population (2020)
  - Total: 43,826
  - Estimate (2025): 44,298 ▲
  - Density: 84.9/sq mi (32.8/km^{2})
- Time zone: UTC−5 (Eastern)
  - Summer (DST): UTC−4 (EDT)
- Congressional district: 2nd
- Website: www.gadsdencountyfl.gov

Gadsden County is a county located in the panhandle of the U.S. state of Florida. As of the 2020 census, the population was 43,826. Its county seat is Quincy. Gadsden County is included in the Tallahassee Metropolitan Statistical Area. As part of the broader Black Belt region within the Deep South, Gadsden County is the only majority African-American county in Florida.

== History ==
Gadsden County was created in 1823. It was named for James Gadsden of South Carolina, who served as Andrew Jackson's aide-de-camp in Florida in 1818. Gadsden County is historically known for its tobacco crop which is obsolete today.

== Geography ==
According to the U.S. Census Bureau, the county has a total area of 529 square miles (1,370 km^{2}), of which 516 square miles (1,340 km^{2}) is land and 12 square miles (31 km^{2}) (2.3%) is water.

Gadsden County is part of the Tallahassee Metropolitan Statistical Area. Gadsden County is in the Eastern Time Zone. Its western border with Jackson County forms the boundary in this area between the Eastern and Central Time Zones.

=== Adjacent counties ===
- Decatur County, Georgia - north
- Seminole County, Georgia - north
- Grady County, Georgia - northeast
- Leon County, Florida - east
- Liberty County, Florida - southwest
- Calhoun County, Florida - southwest (CST)
- Jackson County, Florida - northwest (CST)

== Demographics ==
Historical population
Census	Pop.	Note	%±
1830	4,895		—
1840	5,992		22.4%
1850	8,784		46.6%
1860	9,396		7.0%
1870	9,802		4.3%
1880	12,169		24.1%
1890	11,894		−2.3%
1900	15,294		28.6%
1910	22,198		45.1%
1920	23,539		6.0%
1930	29,890		27.0%
1940	31,450		5.2%
1950	36,457		15.9%
1960	41,989		15.2%
1970	39,184		−6.7%
1980	41,565		6.1%
1990	41,105		−1.1%
2000	45,087		9.7%
2010	46,389		2.9%
2020	43,826		−5.5%
2025 (est.)	44,298	▲	1.1%
U.S. Decennial Census; 1790-1960 1900-1990; 1990-2000 2010-2020

=== 2020 census ===
As of the 2020 census, the county had a population of 43,826, 16,806 households, and 11,239 families. The median age was 43.4 years, with 21.0% of residents under the age of 18 and 20.0% aged 65 or older. For every 100 females there were 95.0 males, and for every 100 females age 18 and over there were 92.7 males age 18 and over.

The population density was 84.9 per square mile (32.8/km^{2}), and there were 18,929 housing units at an average density of 36.7 per square mile (14.2/km^{2}).

The racial makeup of the county was 34.1% White, 53.5% Black or African American, 0.5% American Indian and Alaska Native, 0.3% Asian, <0.1% Native Hawaiian and Pacific Islander, 6.5% from some other race, and 5.1% from two or more races. Hispanic or Latino residents of any race comprised 11.6% of the population.

19.5% of residents lived in urban areas, while 80.5% lived in rural areas.

There were 16,806 households in the county, of which 29.1% had children under the age of 18 living in them. Of all households, 38.8% were married-couple households, 18.8% were households with a male householder and no spouse or partner present, and 36.9% were households with a female householder and no spouse or partner present. About 28.4% of all households were made up of individuals and 13.2% had someone living alone who was 65 years of age or older.

Of those housing units, 11.2% were vacant. Among occupied housing units, 72.6% were owner-occupied and 27.4% were renter-occupied. The homeowner vacancy rate was 1.2% and the rental vacancy rate was 8.6%.

=== Racial and ethnic composition ===
Gadsden County, Florida – Racial and ethnic composition Note: the US Census treats Hispanic/Latino as an ethnic category. This table excludes Latinos from the racial categories and assigns them to a separate category. Hispanics/Latinos may be of any race.
Race / Ethnicity (NH = Non-Hispanic)	Pop 1980	Pop 1990	Pop 2000	Pop 2010	Pop 2020	% 1980	% 1990	% 2000	% 2010	% 2020
White alone (NH)	16,296	16,357	16,174	15,335	14,093	39.21%	39.79%	35.87%	33.06%	32.16%
Black or African American alone (NH)	24,485	23,620	25,632	25,881	23,326	58.91%	57.46%	56.85%	55.79%	53.22%
Native American or Alaska Native alone (NH)	27	64	87	93	71	0.06%	0.16%	0.19%	0.20%	0.16%
Asian alone (NH)	112	85	105	221	147	0.27%	0.21%	0.23%	0.48%	0.34%
Native Hawaiian or Pacific Islander alone (NH)	x	x	9	7	4	x	x	0.02%	0.02%	0.01%
Other race alone (NH)	16	15	24	39	120	0.04%	0.04%	0.05%	0.08%	0.27%
Mixed race or Multiracial (NH)	x	x	274	394	972	x	x	0.61%	0.85%	2.22%
Hispanic or Latino (any race)	629	964	2,782	4,419	5,093	1.51%	2.35%	6.17%	9.53%	11.62%
Total	41,565	41,105	45,087	46,389	43,826	100.00%	100.00%	100.00%	100.00%	100.00%

A map of racial demographics of Gadsden County, Florida by Census tract Legend: Black or African American 50–60% 60–70% 70–80% Non-Hispanic White 40–50% 50–60% 70–80%

Gadsden County is unique in Florida in that it is the state's only county with an African American majority population.

=== American Community Survey (2016–2020) estimates ===
The 2016–2020 American Community Survey 5-year estimates show that the average household size was 2.4, the average family size was 3.0, and 13.8% of the population had a bachelor’s degree or higher.

The 2016–2020 American Community Survey 5-year estimates show that the median household income was $41,135 (with a margin of error of +/- $2,461). The median family income was $50,020 (+/- $3,429). Males had a median income of $32,760 (+/- $2,256) versus $27,905 (+/- $1,732) for females. The median income for those above 16 years old was $29,793 (+/- $1,393).

Approximately, 15.2% of families and 21.3% of the population were below the poverty line, including 33.7% of those under the age of 18 and 10.0% of those ages 65 or over.

=== 2010 census ===
As of the 2010 United States census, there were 46,389 people living in the county. 56.0% were Black or African American, 35.9% White, 0.5% Asian, 0.3% Native American, 5.9% of some other race and 1.3% of two or more races. 9.5% were Hispanic or Latino (of any race).

=== 2000 census ===
As of the census of 2000, there were 45,087 people, 15,867 households, and 11,424 families living in the county. The population density was 87 inhabitants per square mile (34/km^{2}). There were 17,703 housing units at an average density of 34 per square mile (13/km^{2}). The racial makeup of the county was 57.14% Black or African American, 38.70% White, 0.23% Native American, 0.26% Asian, 0.02% Pacific Islander, 2.76% from other races, and 0.89% from two or more races. 6.17% of the population were Hispanic or Latino of any race.

There were 15,867 households, out of which 32.60% had children under the age of 18 living with them, 44.50% were married couples living together, 22.50% had a female householder with no husband present, and 28.00% were non-families. 23.90% of all households were made up of individuals, and 9.50% had someone living alone who was 65 years of age or older. The average household size was 2.69 and the average family size was 3.18.

In the county, the population was spread out, with 26.40% under the age of 18, 9.50% from 18 to 24, 28.90% from 25 to 44, 23.00% from 45 to 64, and 12.20% who were 65 years of age or older. The median age was 36 years. For every 100 females, there were 90.70 males. For every 100 females age 18 and over, there were 86.50 males.

The median income for a household in the county was $31,248, and the median income for a family was $36,238. Males had a median income of $27,159 versus $21,721 for females. The per capita income for the county was $14,499. About 16.40% of families and 19.90% of the population were below the poverty line, including 28.50% of those under age 18 and 16.90% of those age 65 or over.

== Education ==
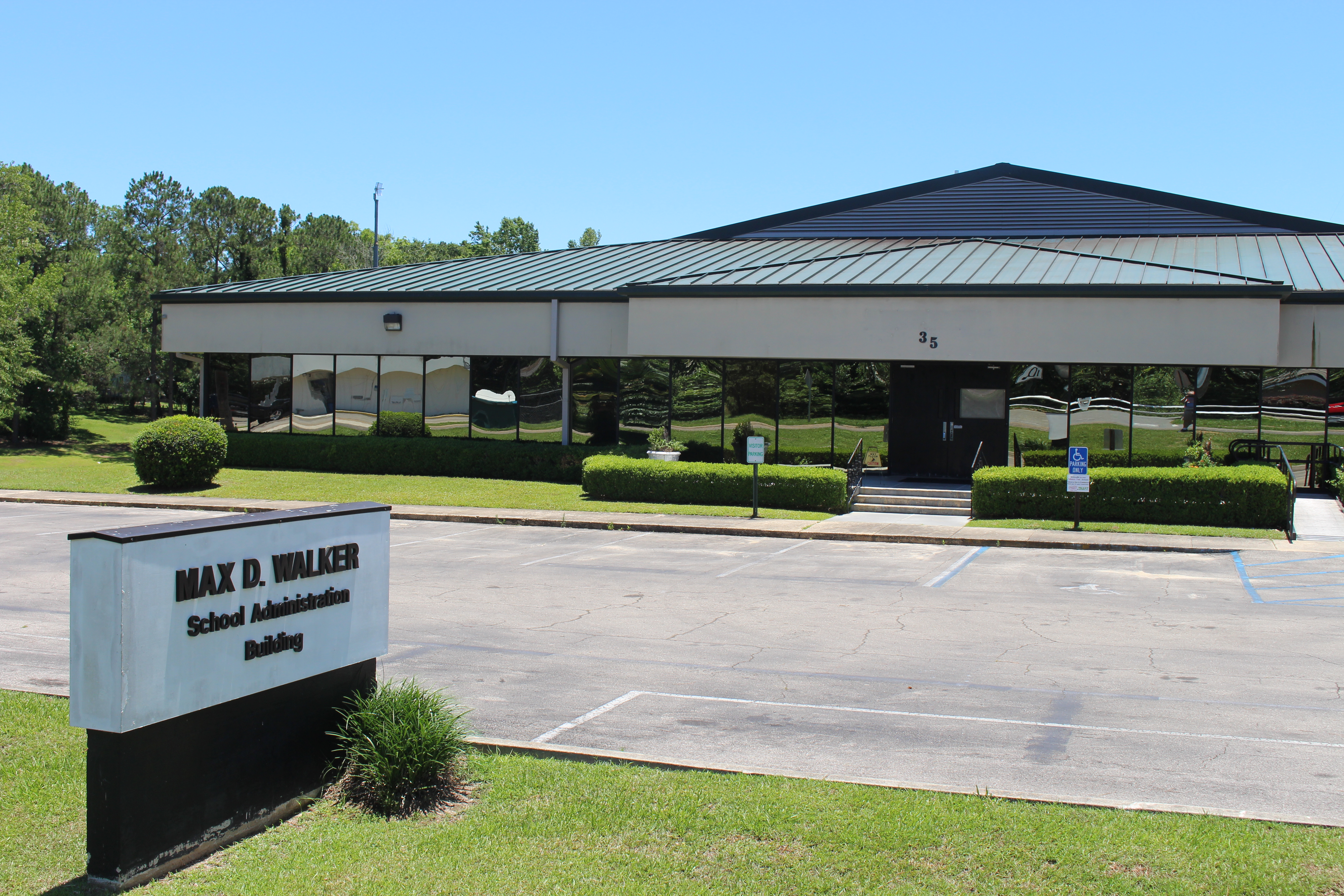
Max D. Walker School Administration Building, the Gadsden County School District headquarters

Rosenwald schools were established in Gadsden County.

The Gadsden County School District, the only school district, operates public schools.

Gadsden County is home to one public high school, Gadsden County High School (formerly East Gadsden High School), formed in 2017 by the merger of East Gadsden High and the high school portion of West Gadsden High School; the West Gadsden High building was converted to West Gadsden Middle. West Gadsden was formed by the merger of the former Chattahoochee High and Greensboro High and was located on the western outskirts of Quincy near Greensboro. East Gadsden, formed by the merger of James A. Shanks High and Havana Northside High, was located on Hwy. 90 east of Quincy.

Robert F. Munroe Day School and Tallavanna Christian School are private schools in the county that were founded as segregation academies.

=== Libraries ===
The Gadsden County Public Library System has 3 branches.

- William A. McGill Library
- Havana Branch
- Chattahoochee Branch

== Politics ==
Gadsden is the strongest Democratic county in Florida, giving Democrats higher margins than even in highly populated urban counties like Broward, despite having a population of 43,826. No Democratic gubernatorial or presidential candidate has received less than 60% of the vote in the county since 1992, even for those who lost in landslides statewide.

In the 2022 gubernatorial election, it was one of only five counties in the state to vote for Democratic nominee Charlie Crist over incumbent Republican governor Ron DeSantis, and it was the only one to give Crist more than 60% of the vote. Crist lost statewide by 19.4%. Similarly, in the 2024 presidential election it was the only county to give Kamala Harris over 60% of the vote, and one of only six counties won by Harris. Harris lost statewide by 13%.

According to the secretary of state's office, Democrats maintain a massive majority of registered voters in Gadsden County. As of May 23, 2022, the county has the highest percentage of registered Democrats of all counties in Florida. The last Republican to win a majority in the county was Richard Nixon in his landslide 1972 victory. As a measure of how strongly Democratic the county is, Gadsden was the solitary Florida county to vote against Reagan in 1984 and George Bush in 1988, even as both won in statewide landslides.

Gadsden County Voter Registration & Party Enrollment as of September 30, 2024
Political Party	Total Voters	Percentage
Democratic	18,300	69.05%
Republican	5,641	21.29%
Independent	2,825	10.66%
Third Parties	413	1.56%
Total	26,501	100.00%

=== Statewide elections ===
United States presidential election results for Gadsden County, Florida
Year	Republican		Democratic		Third party(ies)	
Year	No.	%	No.	%	No.	%
1904	54	10.07%	471	87.87%	11	2.05%
1908	89	12.06%	563	76.29%	86	11.65%
1912	75	9.73%	609	78.99%	87	11.28%
1916	57	5.53%	875	84.95%	98	9.51%
1920	38	1.91%	1,922	96.68%	28	1.41%
1924	47	5.86%	681	84.91%	74	9.23%
1928	346	22.31%	1,184	76.34%	21	1.35%
1932	105	5.33%	1,865	94.67%	0	0.00%
1936	198	7.15%	2,572	92.85%	0	0.00%
1940	417	11.47%	3,218	88.53%	0	0.00%
1944	462	15.22%	2,574	84.78%	0	0.00%
1948	376	13.42%	1,427	50.93%	999	35.65%
1952	1,835	40.41%	2,706	59.59%	0	0.00%
1956	1,321	36.87%	2,262	63.13%	0	0.00%
1960	2,010	46.18%	2,343	53.82%	0	0.00%
1964	5,207	53.33%	4,556	46.67%	0	0.00%
1968	1,337	14.76%	3,274	36.15%	4,446	49.09%
1972	5,995	61.01%	3,829	38.97%	2	0.02%
1976	3,531	33.85%	6,798	65.17%	102	0.98%
1980	3,718	30.41%	8,222	67.26%	285	2.33%
1984	5,807	43.95%	7,403	56.03%	2	0.02%
1988	5,992	47.64%	6,372	50.66%	213	1.69%
1992	3,975	27.62%	8,486	58.96%	1,933	13.43%
1996	3,817	26.88%	9,407	66.25%	975	6.87%
2000	4,770	32.38%	9,736	66.09%	225	1.53%
2004	6,253	29.80%	14,629	69.72%	102	0.49%
2008	6,811	30.22%	15,582	69.14%	145	0.64%
2012	6,630	29.43%	15,770	70.01%	125	0.55%
2016	6,728	30.29%	15,020	67.62%	466	2.10%
2020	7,465	31.42%	16,153	67.98%	144	0.61%
2024	7,495	34.17%	14,203	64.76%	234	1.07%

United States Senate election results for Gadsden County, Florida1
Year	Republican		Democratic		Third party(ies)	
Year	No.	%	No.	%	No.	%
2024	8,221	37.80%	13,192	60.66%	333	1.53%

United States Senate election results for Gadsden County, Florida3
Year	Republican		Democratic		Third party(ies)	
Year	No.	%	No.	%	No.	%
2022	6,086	35.01%	11,113	63.93%	185	1.06%

Florida Gubernatorial election results for Gadsden County
Year	Republican		Democratic		Third party(ies)	
Year	No.	%	No.	%	No.	%
1994	3,422	30.63%	7,751	69.37%	0	0.00%
1998	4,028	35.66%	7,269	64.34%	0	0.00%
2002	3,948	25.83%	11,228	73.46%	109	0.71%
2006	4,557	32.45%	9,303	66.25%	182	1.30%
2010	4,324	25.90%	12,067	72.27%	307	1.84%
2014	4,798	27.27%	12,425	70.62%	371	2.11%
2018	6,200	30.91%	13,712	68.36%	146	0.73%
2022	6,511	37.36%	10,805	62.01%	110	0.63%

County commissioners

- Eric Hinson (District 1)
- Anthony Viegbesie, PhD (District 2)
- Kimblin NeSmith, J.D. (District 3)
- Brenda Holt (District 4)
- Ronterious Green (District 5)

Local elected officials

- Sheriff: Morris A. Young
- Supervisor of Elections: Kenya Ponder Williams
- Tax Collector: W. Dale Summerford
- Property Appraiser: Reginald Cunningham
- Superintendent of Schools: Elijah Key

== Transportation ==
=== Airports ===
- Quincy Municipal Airport

=== Major roads ===
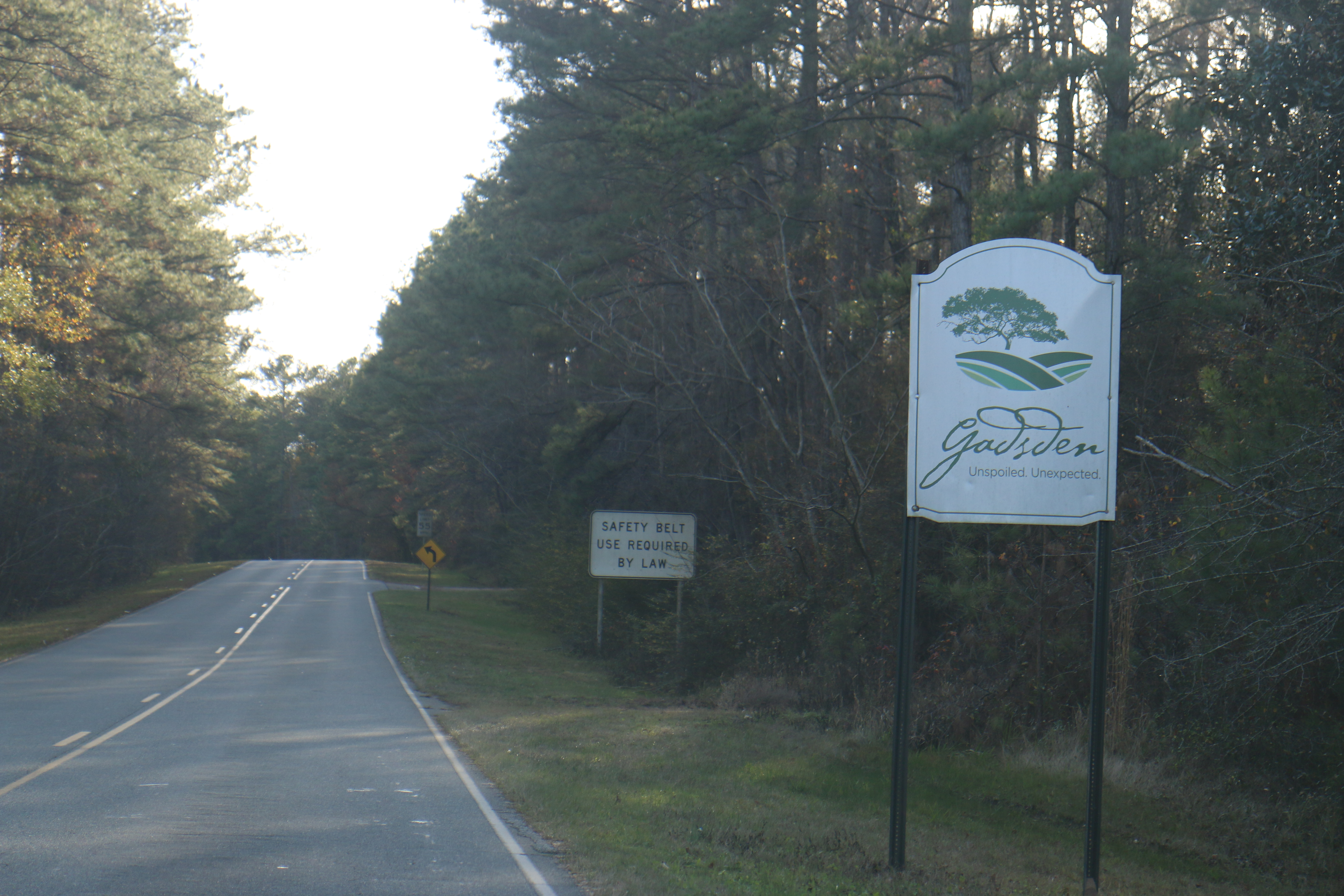
The sign for Gadsden County while entering Florida from Georgia

- I-10 is the main west-to-east interstate highway in the county, and serves as the unofficial dividing line between northern and southern Gadsden County. It contains four interchanges within the county; CR 270A (Exit 166), SR 12 (Exit 174), SR 267 (Exit 181), and US 90 (Exit 192).
- US 90 as the main west-to-east highway in the county prior to the construction of I-10 in the late 1960s. It runs from the Victory Bridge in Chattahoochee in the northwest, and then southeast through Gretna, Douglas City, and Quincy before finally leaving the county east of Midway into Leon County.
- US 27 is the sole south-to-north U.S. highway running through the northeastern part of the county.
- SR 12 is a west-to-east state highway running from Liberty County in the southwest to Havana in the northeast. It also contains a county extension into Leon County.
- SR 65
- SR 159 is a short south to north road connecting US 27 to SR 12 in Havana, with a county extension northwest to Georgia State Route 309 at the Georgia State Line.
- SR 267

=== Railroads ===
Gadsden County has at least four existing railroad lines, three of which are owned by CSX. The first two CSX lines being P&A Subdivision, a line formerly owned by the Louisville and Nashville Railroad, and the other is the Tallahassee Subdivision, a former Seaboard Air Line Railroad line. These two lines meet in Chatahoochee and served Amtrak's Sunset Limited until it was truncated to New Orleans in 2005 by Hurricane Katrina. A third line is the Apalachicola Northern Railroad, a line that spans as far south as Port St. Joe. The line enters from Liberty County, then crosses SR 12 in Greensboro, runs under I-10, follows CR 268 in Hardaway, and then turns west into Chatahoochee. The fourth line is the third CSX Line, the Bainbridge Subdivision, which runs along the west side of US 27 from Leon County by way of a bridge over the Ochlockonee River to the Georgia State Line. While some spurs still exist, other lines within the county were abandoned.

=== Public transportation ===
Public Transportation is provided by Big Bend Transit, which operates 3 bus routes in the county.

== Communities ==
=== Cities ===
- Chattahoochee
- Gretna
- Midway
- Quincy

=== Towns ===
- Havana
- Greensboro

=== Unincorporated areas ===
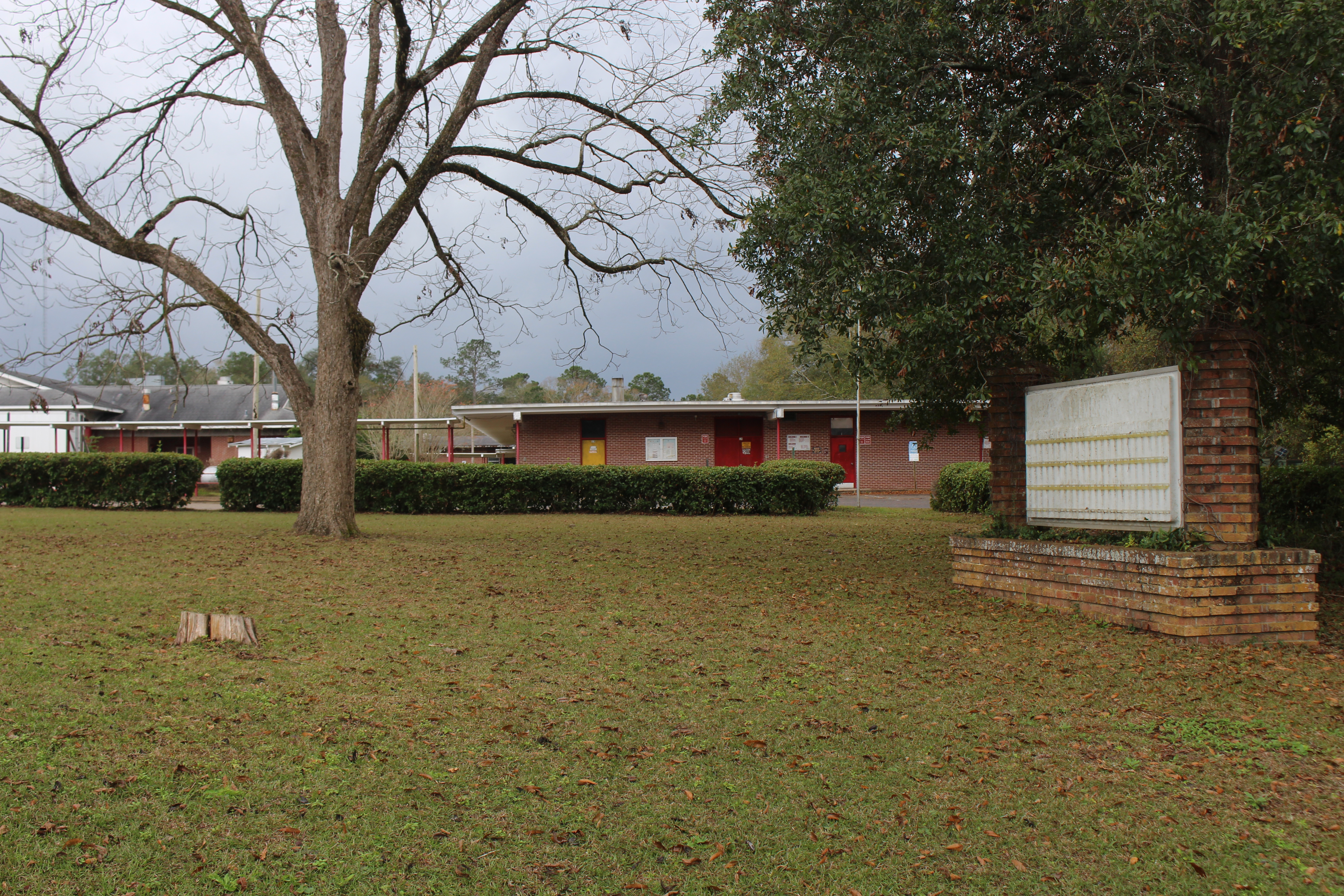
The former St. John Elementary School

- Concord
- Dogtown
- Hinson
- Jamieson
- Lake Tallavana
- Mount Pleasant
- Oak Grove
- Reston
- St. Hebron
- St. John
- Scotland
- Scottown
- Wetumpka

== Gallery ==
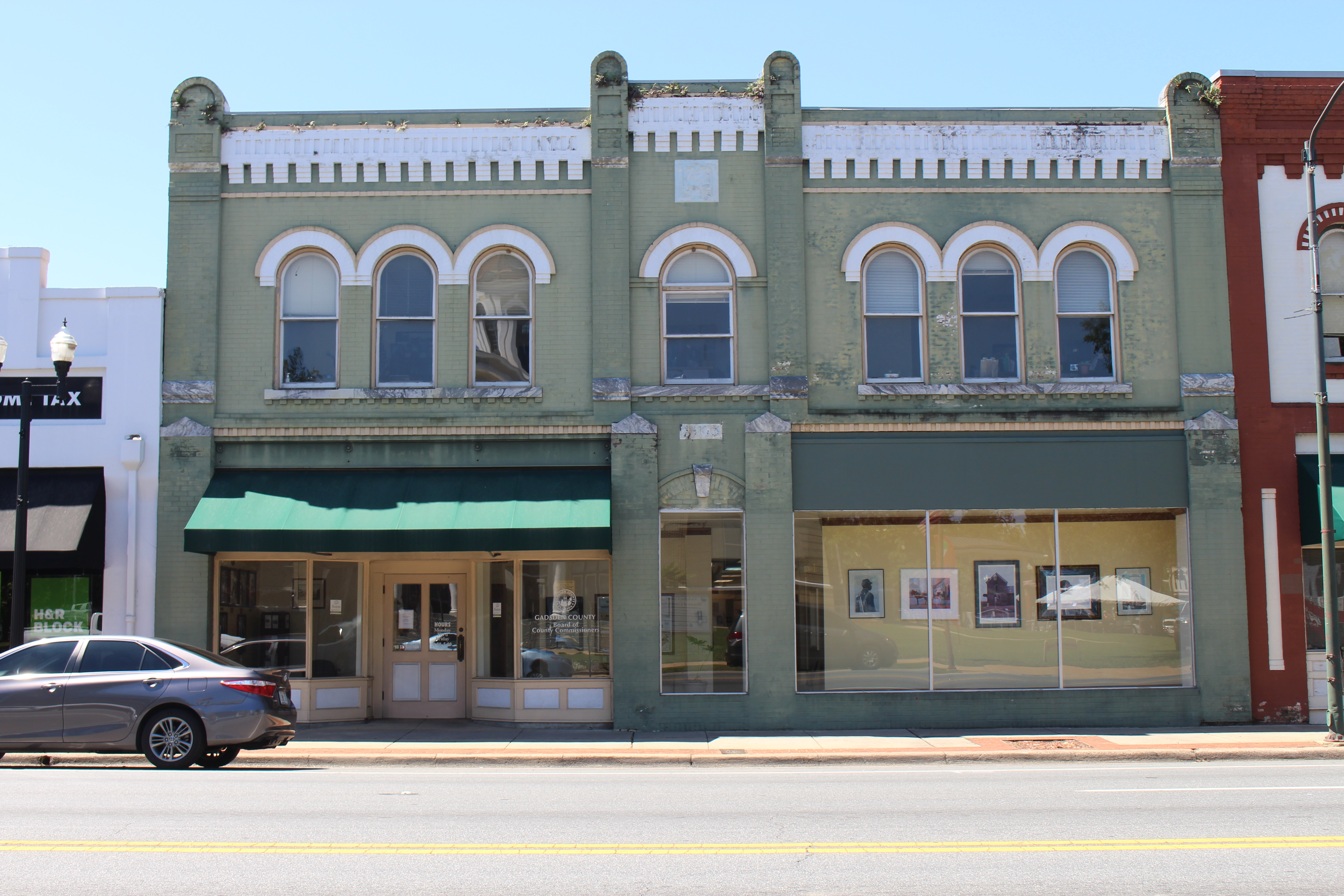
Gadsden County Board of Commissioners

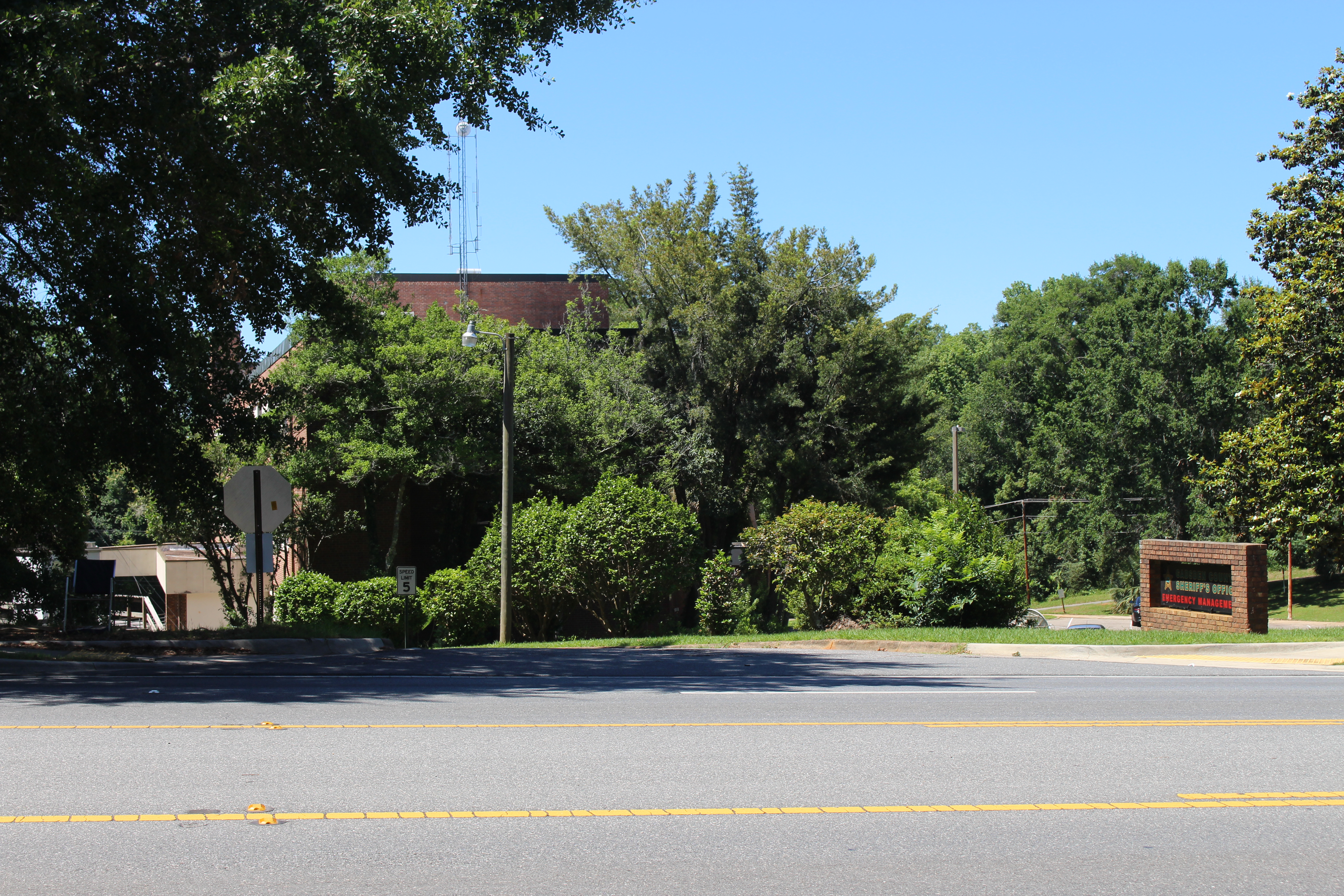
Gadsden County Sheriff's Office

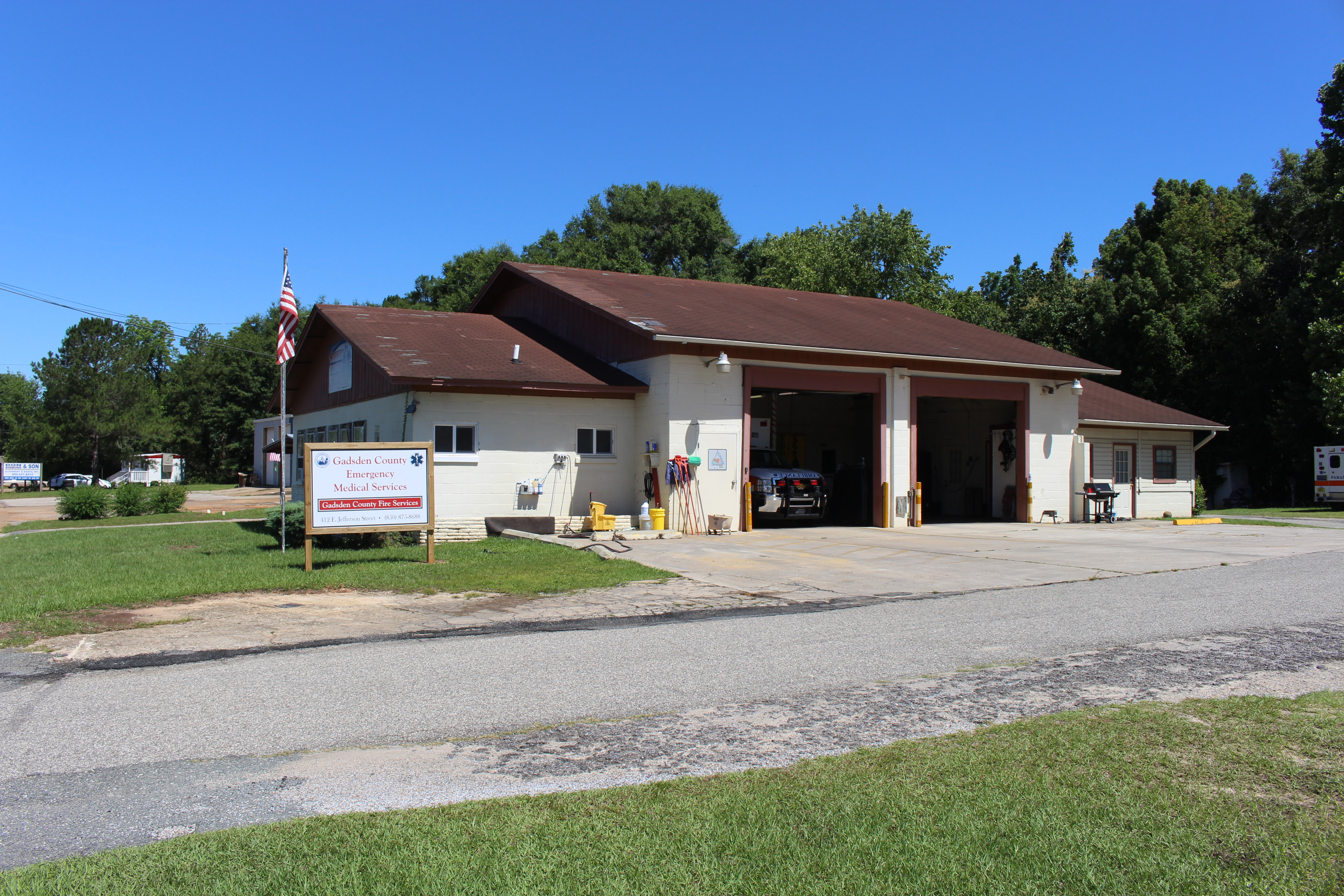
Gadsden County Emergency Medical Services and Gadsden County Fire Services

== See also ==
- National Register of Historic Places listings in Gadsden County, Florida
