= Sweetwater Creek, Florida =

Unincorporated community in Florida, US

- Unincorporated community
- Location within Florida Location within the United States
- Coordinates: 27°59′56″N 82°33′32″W
- Country: United States
- State: Florida
- County: Hillsborough
- Elevation: 7 ft (2.1 m)
- Time zone: UTC-5 (Eastern (EST))
  - Summer (DST): UTC-4 (EDT)
- ZIP code: 33634

Sweetwater Creek is an unincorporated community in Hillsborough County, Florida, United States. It is part of the census-designated place (CDP) of Town 'n' Country. The ZIP code for the community is 33634.

Sweetwater Creek reported as an "unincorporated place" by the U.S. Census Bureau in 1970, which included much of Town 'n' Country census area. The population in 1970 was 19,453.

== Geography ==
Sweetwater Creek is located at 28 degrees north, 82.6 degrees west (27.999, -82.559); or approximately eight miles northwest of Tampa. The elevation of the community is 7 feet above sea level.

== Education ==
The community of Sweetwater Creek is served by Hillsborough County Schools.
