= Scotland, Florida =

Unincorporated community in Florida, U.S.

Coordinates: 30°34′36″N 84°25′49″W

Scotland is an unincorporated community in Gadsden County, Florida, United States. It is located south of Havana at the intersection of County Roads 159 and 270.
