= List of county roads in Liberty County, Florida =

- County road shields used in Florida

Highway names
- Interstates: Interstate X (I-X)
- US Highways: U.S. Highway X (US X)
- State: State Road X (SR X)
- County: County Road X (CR-X)

System links
- County roads in Florida; County roads in Liberty County

The following is a list of county roads in Liberty County, Florida. All county roads are maintained by the county in which they reside, although not all routes are marked with standard county road shields.

== County roads in Liberty County ==
Route	Road Name(s)	From	To	Notes
CR 12		SR 65 in the Apalachicola National Forest in Wilma	SR 20 / Central Street in Bristol	Former SR 12; part of the Maxwell Harrell Scenic Byway
CR 12A	Lake Mystic/Lee Duggar Road	CR 12 south of Bristol	CR 12 south of Bristol	Former SR 12A
CR 22	SW Eighth Street	SR 65 / Eighth Street in Sumatra	Apalachicola National Forest east-northeast of Sumatra	Former SR 22 Not on 2019 map.
CR 67		CR 379 northeast of Woods	CR 67 at the Franklin County line in Tate's Hell State Forest south-southeast of Poplar Camp	Former SR 67
CR 67A	Telogia Cutoff	CR 67 east-southeast of Telogia	SR 65 south-southwest of Hosford	Former SR 67A
CR 270	Martin Luther King Drive	SR 12 / Turkey Creek Road north-northeast of Bristol CR 1641 southeast of Rock Bluff	CR 1641 west-northwest of Rock Bluff CR 270 at the Gadsden County line north-northeast of Rock Bluff	Former SR 270
CR 333		Unknown road south-southwest of Estiffanulga	CR 12 northeast of Estiffanulga	Former SR 333
CR 368		CR 67	Liberty-Wakulla County Line	Former SR 368 Not on 2019 map.
CR 379		SR 65 north-northwest of Sumatra NW Pea Ridge Road south-southeast of Bristol	CR 12 south-southeast of Estiffanulga SR 20 east of Bristol	Former SR 379 Former SR 379 and SR 379A
CR 379A		CR 12 west-southwest of Woods	CR 12 south of Bristol	Former SR 67 and SR 379; Signed as CR 379A, listed by FDOT as CR 379.
CR 0120		SR 20 east of Hosford	Dead end at the Ochlockonee River east-southeast of Hosford	Former SR 20 Signed as CR 0120, listed by FDOT as CR 120.
CR 1641	NW Torreya Park Road	SR 20 northwest of Hosford	Nw Torreya Park Road at Torreya State Park northwest of Rock Bluff	Former SR 271
CR 2224	Blue Creek Road; NE Old Blue Creek Road	SR 65 / Blue Creek Road south-southwest of Hosford	SR 20 east of Hosford	Former SR 267 and SR 553
