= National Register of Historic Places listings in Liberty County, Florida =

Location of Liberty County in Florida

This is a list of the National Register of Historic Places listings in Liberty County, Florida.

This is intended to be a complete list of the properties and districts on the National Register of Historic Places in Liberty County, Florida, United States. The locations of National Register properties and districts for which the latitude and longitude coordinates are included below, may be seen in a map.

There are 4 properties and districts listed on the National Register in the county.

This National Park Service list is complete through NPS recent listings posted July 17, 2026.

Contents: Counties in Florida (non-linked contain no National Register listings)
Alachua - Baker - Bay - Bradford - Brevard - Broward - Calhoun - Charlotte - Citrus - Clay - Collier - Columbia - DeSoto - Dixie - Duval - Escambia - Flagler - Franklin - Gadsden - Gilchrist - Glades - Gulf - Hamilton - Hardee - Hendry - Hernando - Highlands - Hillsborough (Tampa) - Holmes - Indian River - Jackson - Jefferson - Lafayette - Lake - Lee - Leon - Levy - Liberty - Madison - Manatee - Marion - Martin - Miami-Dade (Miami) - Monroe - Nassau - Okaloosa - Okeechobee - Orange - Osceola - Palm Beach - Pasco - Pinellas - Polk - Putnam - St. Johns - St. Lucie - Santa Rosa - Sarasota - Seminole - Sumter - Suwannee - Taylor - Union - Volusia - Wakulla - Walton - Washington

== Current listings ==
	Name on the Register	Image	Date listed	Location	City or town	Description
1	Hosford School and Gymnasium	Hosford School and Gymnasium	July 28, 2020 (#100005392)	16827 NE FL 65; 30°23′21″N 84°47′54″W	Hosford	
2	Otis Hare Archeological Site (8LI172)		July 26, 1989 (#89000862)	Address Restricted	Blountstown	
3	Torreya State Park	Torreya State Park	August 14, 1972 (#72000338)	13 miles (21 km) northeast of Bristol; 30°34′08″N 84°56′53″W	Bristol	A boundary increase was approved November 22, 2024.
4	Yon Mound and Village Site		December 15, 1978 (#78000952)	Address Restricted	Bristol	

== See also ==
- List of National Historic Landmarks in Florida
- National Register of Historic Places listings in Florida
