= Jack J. Harrell =

American politician

Member of the Florida House of Representatives from Liberty County
- In office 1945
- Succeeded by: Lewis H. Baker

Personal details
- Born: September 16, 1899 Bristol, Florida, U.S.
- Died: February 24, 1977 (aged 77)
- Party: Democratic
- Spouse: Virginia B. Baker

Jack Harrell (September 16, 1899 – February 24, 1977) was an American politician. He served as a Democratic member of the Florida House of Representatives.

== Life and career ==
Harrell was born in Bristol, Florida.

Harrell served in the Florida House of Representatives in 1945.

Harrel died on February 24, 1977, at the age of 76.
