= Lewis Baker =

Lewis Baker may refer to:

- Lewis Baker (politician) (1832–1899), West Virginia politician and diplomat
- Lewis Baker (gridiron football) (born 1984), American football player for the San Francisco 49ers
- Lew Baker (Lewis Baker, c. 1825–?), American police officer employed as a "slugger" for Tammany Hall
- Lewis Baker (footballer) (born 1995), English footballer
- Lewis Baker (cricketer) (1920–1997), New Zealand cricketer
- Lewis H. Baker (1908–1954), American politician, member of the Florida House of Representatives
- Lewis Baker, author of The Percys of Mississippi

== See also ==
- Lewis Clinton-Baker (1866–1939), Royal Navy officer
- Louis Baker, musician
