= Glenn E. Summers =

American attorney and politician (1925–2020)

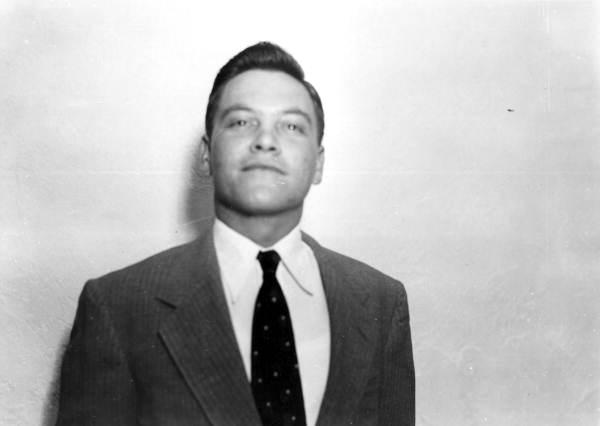

Member of the Florida House of Representatives for Liberty County
- In office 1947–1951
- Preceded by: Lewis H. Baker
- Succeeded by: Red Alexander

Personal details
- Born: Glenn Edsel Summers; February 19, 1925 Bristol, Florida, U.S.
- Died: February 16, 2020 (aged 94) Bristol, Florida, U.S.
- Party: Democratic
- Occupation: Attorney

Glenn Edsel Summers (February 19, 1925 – February 16, 2020) was an American attorney and politician in the state of Florida.

Summers was born in Bristol, Florida. He was a veteran of World War II and served in the United States Navy. Summers received his bachelor's and law degrees from University of Florida. Summers practiced law in Bristol, Florida. He also served as county judge for Liberty County, Florida from 1976 until his retirement in 1997. Summers also lived in Estiffanulga, Florida after he retired as county judge. He served in the Florida House of Representatives from 1947 to 1951, as a Democrat, representing Liberty County.
