= Liberty County High School (Florida) =

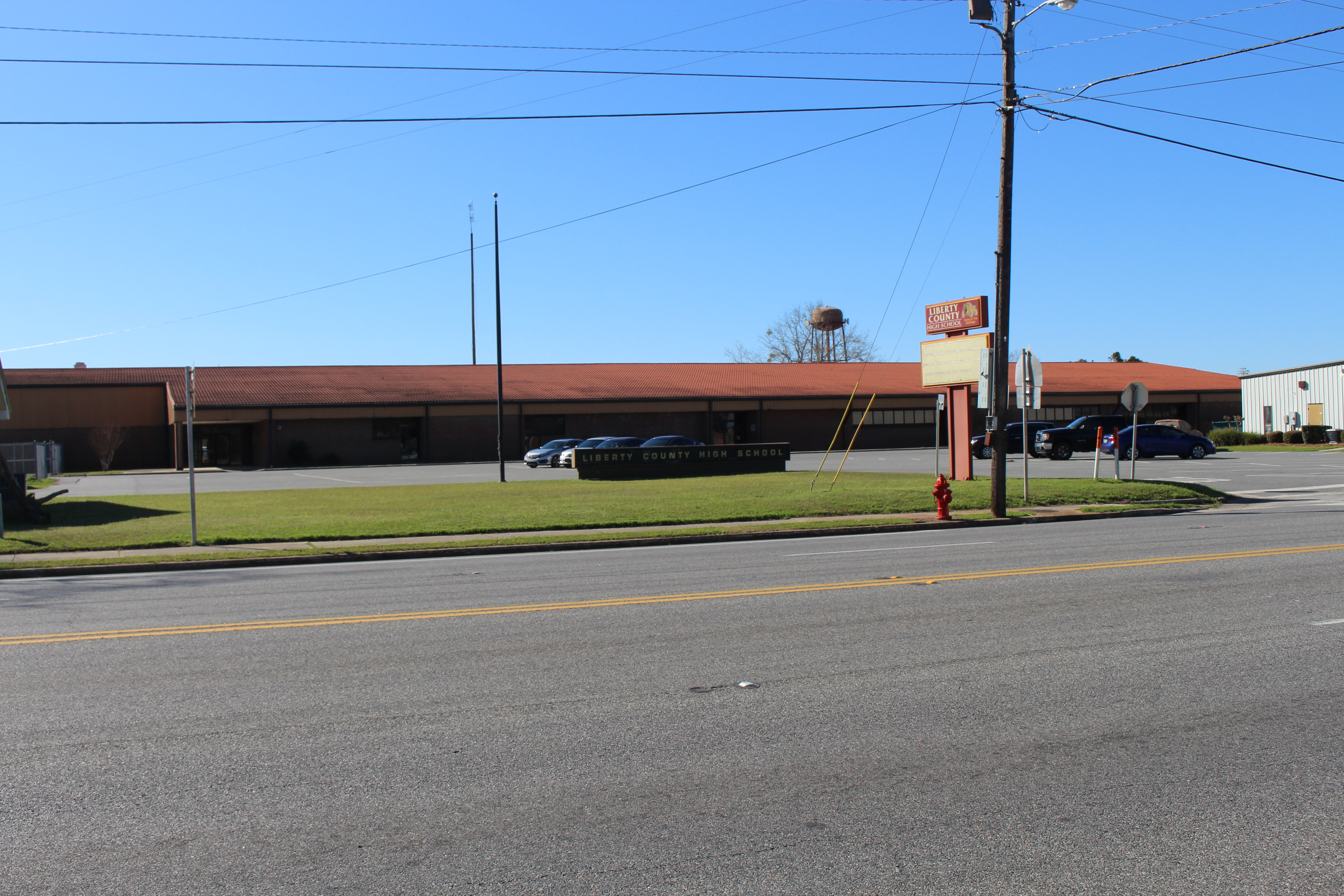
- Former site of LCHS

Location
- 12852 Co Rd 12; Bristol, Florida 32321; United States
- Coordinates: 30.43096°N 84.9758°W

Information
- Type: Public
- Principal: Eric Willis
- Teaching staff: 20.57 (FTE)
- Grades: 9-12
- Enrollment: 354 (2023–2024)
- Student to teacher ratio: 17.21
- Colors: Garnet and gold
- Mascot: Bulldogs
- Rival: Blountstown High School
- Website: lchs.lcsb.org

Liberty County High School is a public high school teaching grades 9–12. The school is located in Bristol, Florida, which is the county seat of Liberty County in the Florida Panhandle near Tallahassee. The school is operated by the Liberty County School District. It is the only high school in Liberty County, with around 325 students from Hosford Junior High in Hosford and W.R. Tolar School in Bristol. The school is partnered with Chipola College for its dual enrollment program.

== Sports teams ==
- Football
- Boys' Basketball
- Girls' Basketball
- Baseball
- Softball
- Volleyball
- Beach Volleyball
- Co-Ed Track and Field
- Co-Ed Cross Country
- Wrestling
- Weightlifting
- Cheerleading

The school has won four state championships; two in softball, in 2013 and 2023, with an additional runner-up finish in 2026, and two in volleyball, in 2022 and 2024, with an additional runner-up finish in 2013. The football team finished as state runner-up in 1969. The school has also won individual state titles in track and field as well as weightlifting.

== Clubs ==
- Student Council
- Senior Beta Club
- FCA (Fellowship of Christian Athletes)
- FCCLA (Family, Career, and Community Leaders of America)
- AJROTC
- HOSA (Health Occupations Students of America)
- FFA (Future Farmers of America)

== Notable alumni ==
- Glenn E. Summers, Former member of the Florida House of Representatives
- Tim Davis, Former MLB player (Seattle Mariners)
- Tim Young, Former MLB player (Montreal Expos, Boston Red Sox) and Olympic gold medalist
