= Hosford =

Hosford (also spelled Horsford) is a name of English origin. It may refer to:

== People ==
- Chauncey Hosford, Oregon pioneer.
- Edward Columbus Hosford, American architect
- Henry Hosford Gurley, Congressman from Louisiana
- Kyle Hosford, Irish basketball player
- Robert Flournoy Hosford, Florida politician

== Other ==
- Hosford-Abernethy, Portland, Oregon, a neighborhood
- Hosford yield criterion, a physics equation
- John Hosford House, a historic building in Ohio
- Hosford, Florida, community in Liberty County, Florida
