= Tim Young (baseball) =

American baseball player (born 1973)

- Pitcher
- Born: October 15, 1973 (age 52); Gulfport, Mississippi, U.S.
- Batted: Left Threw: Left

Professional debut
- MLB: September 5, 1998, for the Montreal Expos
- NPB: March 30, 2001, for the Hiroshima Toyo Carp
- CPBL: May 23, 2004, for the Sinon Bulls

Last appearance
- MLB: July 6, 2000, for the Boston Red Sox
- NPB: July 3, 2001, for the Hiroshima Toyo Carp
- CPBL: June 13, 2004, for the Sinon Bulls

MLB statistics
- Win–loss record: 0–0
- Earned run average: 6.23
- Strikeouts: 13

NPB statistics
- Win–loss record: 0–0
- Earned run average: 3.00
- Strikeouts: 0

CPBL statistics
- Win–loss record: 0–0
- Earned run average: 3.07
- Strikeouts: 19
- Stats at Baseball Reference

Teams
- Montreal Expos (1998); Boston Red Sox (2000); Hiroshima Toyo Carp (2001); Sinon Bulls (2004)

Career highlights and awards
- Taiwan Series champion (2004)
Medals
Men's baseball
Representing United States
Olympic Games
Gold medal – first place	2000 Sydney	Team

Timothy R. Young (born October 15, 1973) is an American former professional baseball pitcher. He played professionally for the Montreal Expos and the Boston Red Sox of Major League Baseball (MLB), and was a member of the United States national baseball team that won a gold medal in the 2000 Summer Olympics in Sydney.

== Early life ==
Born in Gulfport, Mississippi, Young attended Liberty County High School in Bristol, Florida. He played college baseball at the University of Alabama.

== Professional career ==
On June 4, 1996, at 5'9" and 170 pounds, Young was drafted by the Montreal Expos in the 19th round of the 1996 Major League Baseball draft. He played one season for the Expos in 1998, and was granted free agency on December 18, 1998.

Young signed as a free agent with the Boston Red Sox on February 3, 1999, and played one season with the team in 2000. In an 18-game major league career, he posted a 6.23 ERA with 13 strikeouts in 13 innings pitched without a decision or save.

He was a member of the US Baseball Team that won a gold medal at the 2000 Summer Olympics in Sydney. In December 2000 he was purchased by the Hiroshima Toyo Carp of Japan's Central League.

He continued to play in the minor leagues until 2004, playing for 12 different minor league teams between 1996 and 2004. He pitched for Triple-A Pawtucket, Syracuse, Colorado, Memphis and Buffalo.

In 2004, Young played for the Sinon Bulls of the Chinese Professional Baseball League.
