= Otis Hare Archeological Site =

Archaeological site in Florida, United States

- Otis Hare Archeological Site (8LI172)
- U.S. National Register of Historic Places
- Location within Florida Location within the United States
- Location: Liberty County, Florida
- Nearest city: Bristol
- Coordinates: 30.41°N 85.01°W
- NRHP reference No.: 89000862
- Added to NRHP: July 26, 1989

The Otis Hare Archeological Site (also known as the Owen House Site) is a historic site near Bristol, Florida, at mile 73 on the east bank of the Apalachicola River. On July 26, 1989, it was added to the U.S. National Register of Historic Places.
