= Lewis H. Baker =

American politician

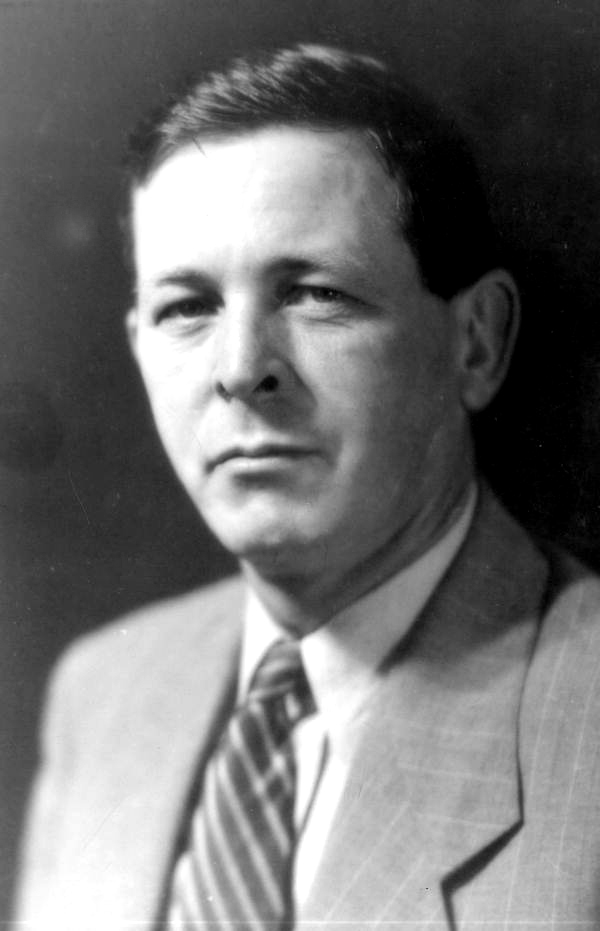
- Baker in 1947

Member of the Florida House of Representatives from Liberty County
- In office 1947–1948
- Preceded by: Jack J. Harrell
- Succeeded by: Glenn E. Summers

Personal details
- Born: October 6, 1908 Bristol, Florida, U.S.
- Died: December 2, 1954 (aged 46)
- Party: Democratic

Lewis H. Baker (October 6, 1908 – December 2, 1954) was an American politician. He served as a Democratic member of the Florida House of Representatives.

== Life and career ==
Baker was born in Bristol, Florida.

Baker served in the Florida House of Representatives from 1947 to 1948.

Baker died December 2, 1954, at the age of 46 at his home in Bristol, Florida from heart problems.
