= E. Amos Sumner =

American politician

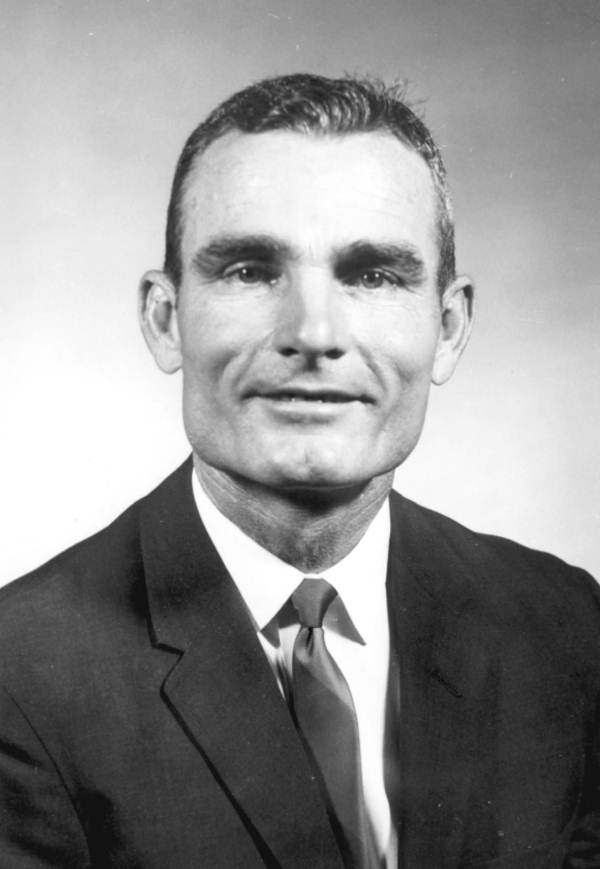
- Sumner in 1965

Member of the Florida House of Representatives from Liberty County
- In office 1965–1966

Personal details
- Born: June 2, 1924
- Died: May 18, 2010 (aged 85)
- Party: Democratic
- Spouse: Earline Stoutamire
- Education: University of Georgia

E. Amos Sumner (June 2, 1924 – May 18, 2010) was an American politician. He served as a Democratic member of the Florida House of Representatives.

== Life and career ==
Sumner attended the University of Georgia.

In 1965, Sumner was elected to the Florida House of Representatives, serving until 1966.

Sumner died in May 2010, at the age of 85.
