= Liberty County School District =

School districts named Liberty County School District in the U.S. include:

- Liberty County School District (Florida)
- Liberty County School District (Georgia)
