= Lake Mystic, Florida =

- Unincorporated community
- Location within Florida Location within the United States
- Coordinates: 30°22′46″N 85°00′05″W
- Country: United States
- State: Florida
- County: Liberty

Area
  - Total: 4.708 sq mi (12.19 km^{2})
  - Land: 4.538 sq mi (11.75 km^{2})
  - Water: 0.170 sq mi (0.44 km^{2})
- Elevation: 138 ft (42 m)

Population (2010)
  - Total: 500
  - Density: 110/sq mi (43/km^{2})
- Time zone: UTC-5 (Eastern (EST))
  - Summer (DST): UTC-4 (EDT)
- ZIP code: 32321
- Area code: 850
- GNIS feature ID: 2628523

Lake Mystic is an unincorporated community and census-designated place in Liberty County, Florida, United States. As of the 2020 census, Lake Mystic had a population of 510.

== Geography ==
According to the U.S. Census Bureau, the community has an area of 4.708 square miles (12.19 km^{2}); 4.538 square miles (11.75 km^{2}) of its area is land, and 0.170 square miles (0.44 km^{2}) is water.

== Demographics ==
Lake Mystic first appeared as a census designated place in the 2010 U.S. census.
