= Robert Flournoy Hosford =

American politician

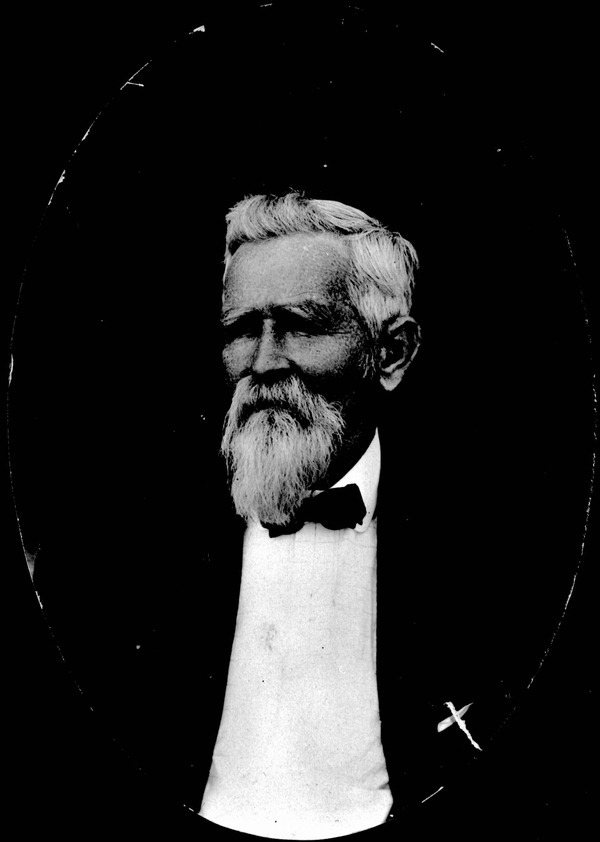

Member of the Florida Senate from the 5th district
- In office 1909–1912

Member of the Florida House of Representatives from the Liberty County district
- In office 1913–1914

Member of the Florida House of Representatives from the Liberty County district
- In office 1898–1900

Personal details
- Born: Robert Flournoy Hosford; September 6, 1842 Mount Vernon, Georgia, U.S.
- Died: May 16, 1924 (aged 81) Florida
- Party: Democratic
- Spouses: Katherine S. Coe (m. 1879; died 1886); Carrie Missouri Stoutamire (m. 1889)
- Children: 7
- Parent(s): Isaac Russell Hosford and Isabella McLaughlin

Military service
- Allegiance: United States
- Branch/service: Florida Militia
- Years of service: 1870 - 1872
- Rank: Captain

Robert Flournoy Hosford (September 6, 1842 – May 16, 1924) was an American politician. He was a member of the Democratic Party. Born in Georgia, he served in both the Florida Senate and the Florida House of Representatives.

== History ==
Hosford was born on September 6, 1842, in Mount Vernon, Georgia, which is located in Montgomery County. His parents were Isaac Russell Hosford and Isabella McLaughlin. He was of English and Scottish ancestry. In the late 1850s, Isaac Russell Hosford moved his family, including Robert Flournoy, from Georgia to Liberty County, Florida.

Katherine S. Coe was Hosford's first wife, but she died in 1886 after less than 10 years of marriage. They had two children. In 1889, he married Carrie Stoutamire and they had five children.

== Career ==
Hosford wore many different hats throughout his life. He was a state politician, a Judge, a soldier, a Sheriff, a tax assessor, a surveyor, a farmer, a saw mill operator, and a mail carrier.

In 1872, Hosford was a captain in the Florida State Militia.

Hosford served in many various positions in Liberty County, Florida. He first served as a Tax Assessor and later became the Sheriff. Then, in 1885, he became the first elected Judge in Liberty County. That same year the State of Florida reimbursed him for surveying and establishing the border between Liberty and Franklin Counties.

He entered state politics in 1898, when he was elected to the Florida House of Representatives. From 1909 to 1912, he served as the District 5 Senator in the Florida Senate. District 5 included Liberty County, Wakulla County, and Franklin County. From 1913 - 1914 he served again in the Florida House of Representatives for Liberty County.

=== Wesleyan Methodist Church of Hosford ===
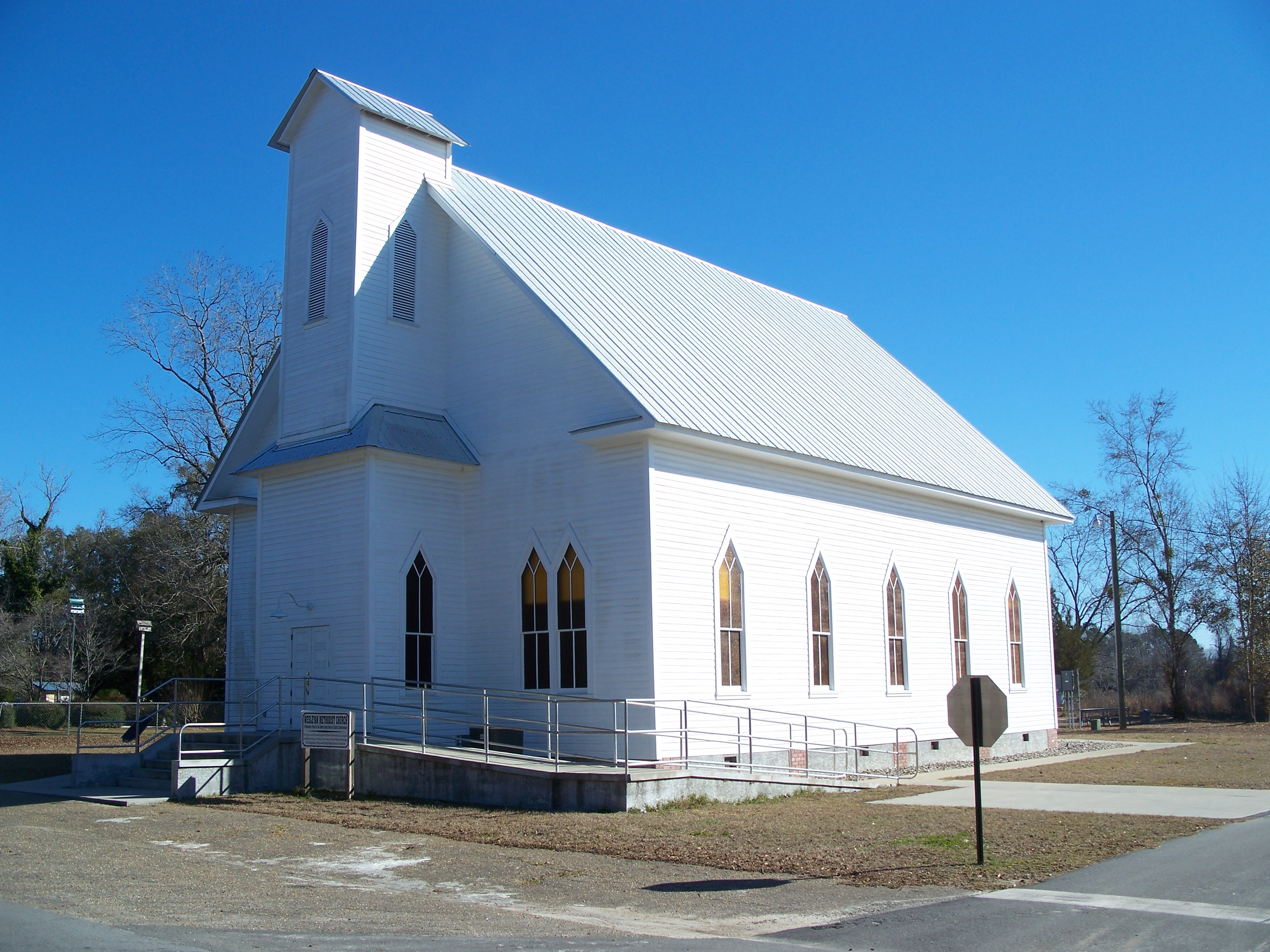
Wesleyan Methodist Church of Hosford

In 1901, Hosford oversaw the construction of the Wesleyan Methodist Church of Hosford. It was built with the lumber from Truman Edward Thomas' sawmill, which was the same sawmill that built the Grave Brothers Mill in Hosford. The wood used to construct the church include heart pine as well as cypress. In addition, there is a 19th Century bell in the bell tower. The church was originally the Hosford Methodist Episcopal Church South and later became the Hosford Wesleyan Methodist Church. The last service was held in the church in 1991. While it was maintained for many years, the church eventually fell into disrepair. Then in the early 2000s, the Florida historic preservation society awarded a $400,000 grant that was used to restore the church. The Wesleyan Methodist Church of Hosford is the oldest standing structure in Liberty County, Florida. The Liberty County Board of Commissioners currently has a 99-year lease on the church and the church is used for public purposes.

=== Florida State Senate ===
While he served in the Florida Senate, Hosford was instrumental to bringing the railroad to Liberty County. He helped the survey crew and also helped negotiate right-of-ways for the railroad. In recognition of his work, Apalachicola Northern Railroad renamed the town of Coe's Mill to Hosford.

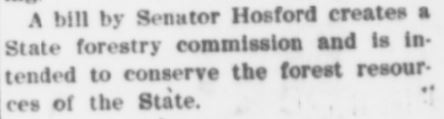
Gainesville Daily Sun Mention of Sen. Hosford May 6, 1909

In 1909, Hosford served as the Chairman of the Committee on Agriculture and Forestry in the Florida Senate. While serving as Committee Chair, he introduced a bill to aid in the conservation of state forests and to create a state forestry commission. He also served on a number of other Committees in 1909: the Immigration Committee, Indian Affairs Committee, the Pensions Committee, the Prison and Convicts Committee, and the Privileges and Elections Committee.

Hosford served as the Pensions Committee Chairman, as well as a member of the Agriculture and Forestry Committee, Claims Committee, Commerce and Navigation Committee, and the Public Roads and Highways Committee in the 1911 Florida Senate.

=== Florida House of Representatives ===
Hosford originally served in the Florida House of Representatives from 1898 - 1900. After his time for in the Florida Senate, he returned to the Florida House of Representatives from 1913 - 1914. In 1913, he was appointed to the Agriculture Committee, Commerce and Navigation Committee, County Roads and Bridges Committee, Game Committee, and State Pensions Committee.

== Death ==
Hosford died May 16, 1924. He is buried in the Hosford Cemetery in Hosford, Florida.

== Ancestry ==
Hosford's paternal Grandfather immigrated from England around 1800. His paternal Grandmother Elizabeth Williams is believed to be related to Colonel James Williams, one of the highest ranking American officers to be killed in the American Revolutionary War. Both of his maternal grandparents immigrated from Scotland.

Ancestors of Robert Flournoy Hosford

4. John Hosford
2. Isaac Russell Hosford
5. Elizabeth Williams
1. Robert Flournoy Hosford
6. John McLaughlin
3. Isabella McLaughlin
7. Margarette Baxter
