= Florida State Road 65 =

State highway in Florida, United States

State Road 65

Route information
- Maintained by FDOT
- Length: 71.142 mi (114.492 km)

Major junctions
- South end: US 98 / US 319 near Eastpoint
- SR 20 in Hosford
- North end: SR 12 near Gretna

Location
- Country: United States
- State: Florida
- Counties: Franklin, Liberty, Gadsden

Highway system
- Florida State Highway System; Interstate; US; State; Former; Pre‑1945; Toll; Scenic
← SR 64	→ SR 66

State Road 65 (SR 65) is a north–south route in the eastern panhandle, running from a junction with US 98/319 near Eastpoint northwards through the Apalachicola National Forest to SR 12 west of Quincy, near US 90.

== Route description ==
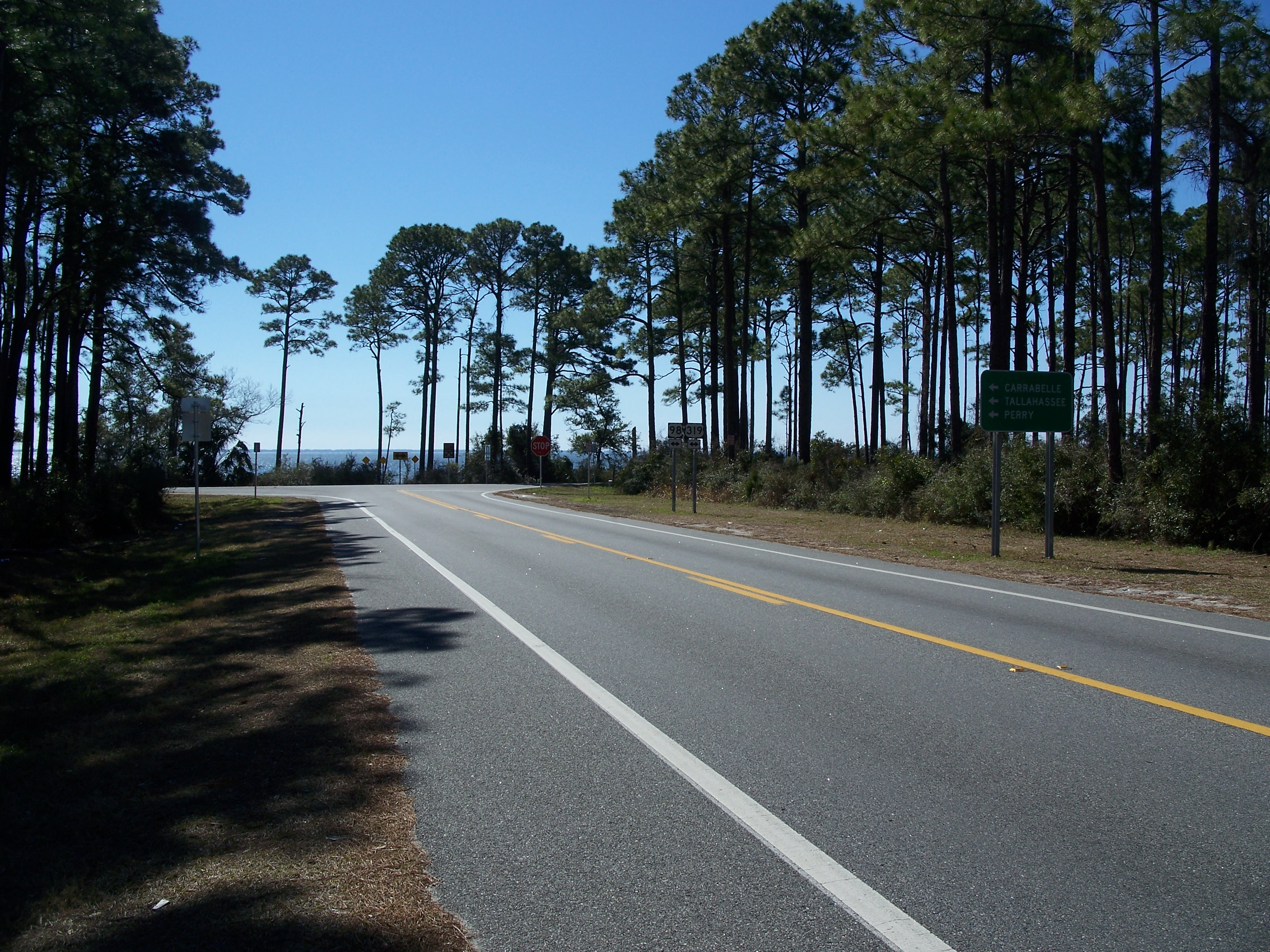
Southern end, near Eastpoint

The route begins at US 98/319 in Green Point, a rural community east of Eastpoint on the Gulf of Mexico in Franklin County, Florida. For the road's first 2.6 miles (4.2 km) it runs straight north, and after this curves to the northwest. From here the road becomes North Shore Bay Road and winds around the southern border of the Tates Hell Swamp. As the road enters Beverly, it faces an at-grade crossing with an Apalachicola Northern Railroad line and then curves straight north again where it enters Apalachicola National Forest. In Buck Siding that line begins to run parallel to the east side of SR 65 and continues to do so as it crosses the Franklin-Liberty County Line. No sooner does the road cross that county line than it enters an unincorporated community named Sumatra where it has an intersection with County Road 22, also known as National Forest Route 175 and then County Road 379. Just around the intersection of NF Road 180, SR 65 curves to the northeast, where from here it spends the rest of its journey through the forest running from southwestern to northeastern Liberty County. In Wilma SR 65 has a wye intersection with County Road 12, a county road that wouldn't seem so important at the time but will prove to be important later on.

Emerging from the forest, SR 65 enters Telogia where it has an intersection with County Road 67 and later the northwestern terminus of County Road 67A. North of this community the road crosses a bridge over the Telogia Creek and then has an intersection with the western terminus of County Road 2224 (Blue Creek Road, formerly CR 267). Curving straight north in front of a cemetery, SR 65 enters Hosford, Florida where it continues on this trajectory for more than four blocks. After the intersection with Tin Can Road and Woodman Street, SR 65 serves as the western border for Hosford Elementary-Junior High School, before curving to the northeast again where it has a major intersection with State Road 20 at a blinker-light intersection. Continuing its northeast curve, it passes by a man-made lake leading to a tributary of Telogia Creek and then a power sub-station before briefly curving more to the north. Eventually this trajectory too shall end as it crosses the very Apalachicola Northern Railroad line it followed since Buck Siding. The rest of the way, SR 65 continues to wind towards the northeast as it crosses the Liberty-Gadsden County Line, and adopts the name Hosford Highway.

Just after crossing the county line, SR 65 runs over a bridge over Ocklawaha Creek and runs through a parcel of land known as the Forbes Purchase. During its time in this region, the road serves as the western terminus of County Road 65B (Old Federal Road) and then the southeastern terminus of County Road 65A. In Sawdust SR 65 has an intersection with County Road 274. Just before curving straight north, the road serves as the northeastern terminus of County Road 65A just south of the bridge over Interstate 10. Despite being a state road, SR 65 has no access to I-10, which it crosses over with a two-lane bridge. The road takes one last curve to the northeast before a wye intersection with State Road 12 where the route ends. Apart from several SR 65 shields in Quincy that refer to County Road 65, there are no signs connecting the two 65s.

== History ==
Originally, SR 65 was co-signed with US 90 to Quincy, then north alone to the Georgia border, where it becomes State Route 241. Sometime in the 1990s, FDOT downgraded the stretch of SR 65 from Quincy to the Georgia border to the Gadsden County government, in which that segment became County Road 65.

== Major intersections ==
County	Location	mi	km	Destinations	Notes
Franklin	Green Point	0.000	0.000	US 98 / US 319 (SR 30) – Apalachicola, Mexico Beach, Panama City, Carrabelle, Tallahassee, Perry, St. George Island State Park	
Liberty	Sumatra	24.716	39.777	Southwest Eighth Street (CR 22 east)	
Liberty		25.263	40.657	CR 379 north – Bristol	
Liberty	Wilma	34.643	55.753	CR 12 north	
Liberty	Wilma	35.011	56.345	FH 13	former SR 368
Liberty	Telogia	51.126	82.279	CR 67 – Carrabelle	
Liberty		52.711	84.830	CR 67A south (Telogia Cutoff)	
Liberty		53.478	86.064	CR 2224 east (Blue Creek Road)	
Liberty	Hosford	54.335	87.444	SR 20 – Bristol, Tallahassee	
Gadsden		64.724	104.163	CR 65B east (Old Federal Road)	
Gadsden		65.919	106.086	CR 65A north (Juniper Creek Road) – Greensboro	
Gadsden	Sawdust	67.941	109.340	CR 274 (Sawdust Road / Providence Road)	
Gadsden		69.411	111.706	CR 65A south (Juniper Creek Road)	
Gadsden		71.142	114.492	SR 12 – Greensboro, Quincy	
1.000 mi = 1.609 km; 1.000 km = 0.621 mi

== Related routes ==
State Road 65 contains eight related county roads, all of which are in Gadsden County, Florida. These include a county extension of a former segment of SR 65, and several suffixed alternate routes, many of which are duplicates of one another.

=== County Road 65 ===
County Road 65
- Location: Quincy-near Dogtown

County Road 65 is the county extension of SR 65 north from Quincy. The route begins as North Madison Avenue, then becomes Attapulgus Highway north of the city limits. As Attapulgus Highway, the route winds around the outskirts of Quincy before curving primarily towards the northeast. County Road 65 crosses the Florida-Georgia State Line west of Dogtown, and becomes State Route 241.

=== County Road 65A ===
County Road 65A
- Location: Gadsden County

County Road 65A is a suffixed alternate county route of SR 65 that can actually be found in one of three locations in Gadsden County.

The first and southernmost CR 65A is named Juniper Creek Road, a loop road on the west side of SR 65 in rural Gadsden County southeast of Greensboro and around Sawdust. The only moderate intersections are with the eastern terminus of CR 65D and CR 274. The road ends at SR 65 on the south side of the bridge over I-10. A former segment of this road can be found on the northwest corner of this bridge as Breeden Road, which becomes a dead end street north of the right-of-way of I-10.

The second CR 65A is Dewey Johnson Way which begins just east of the north end of SR 65 near Douglas City and runs directly south to north. The sole moderate intersection along this road is CR 270A, which has a connecting spur on the northwest corner. The route ends at CR 268 in Gretna.

The third, and northernmost CR 65A is Porter Mitchell Road which runs northwest from CR 65 to the Florida-Georgia State Line. Upon crossing the border, the road keeps the name Porter Mitchell Road.

=== County Road 65B ===
County Road 65B
- Location: Gadsden County

County Road 65B is another county suffixed alternate route of SR 65, that can be found in two locations in Gadsden County.

The southernmost CR 65B is named Old Federal Road. It runs southeast from SR 65 towards the Lake Talquin area. In the vicinity of the Bear Creek Preserve, CR 65B intersects State Road 267 which also leads to CR 65C. The road makes a sharp northeast turn just before the intersection of Bear Creek Road. One other moderate intersection can be found along this segment, specifically CR 267A (Spooner Road), which is shared with a dirt road named Magnolia Farm Road. This segment of CR 65B ends at CR 268 (Highbridge Road) three blocks southeast of a bridge over I-10.

The northernmost CR 65B is named Bettstown Road, which unlike Old Federal Road actually connects to one of the other county-suffixed alternates rather than to SR 65 or CR 65. The route runs west from CR 65A then curves northwest to the Florida-Georgia State Line. Unlike nearby CR 65A however, the name of the street changes to Betts Community Road upon crossing the border.

=== County Road 65C ===
County Road 65C
- Location: Lake Talquin (Bear Creek Recreational Area)

County Road 65C is named McCall Bridge Road, and does not connect to either SR 65 or CR 65. In fact, there's very little evidence it even connects to a suffixed alternate of these routes, other than the possibility of a hidden concurrency with State Road 267 towards southern CR 65B. The road begins at SR 267 at the Wetumpka Volunteer Fire Department, and runs southeast through the Bear Creek Recreational Area of Lake Talquin State Park. Before entering the park, it passes by the Antioch Cemetery.

Just east of the park, it encounters the northern terminus of Lakeview Point Road, which leads to the Lakeview Point Boat Ramp. The road then turns to the south itself near Bear Creek Road. County Road 65C ends on the north shore of Lake Talquin at a boat ramp of its own.

=== County Road 65D ===
County Road 65D
- Location: Gadsden County

County Road 65D is another county suffixed alternate of SR 65, which actually connects to one of the other county suffixed alternates. The entire road is named Telogia Creek Road and runs east and west from SR 12 to southern CR 65A south of Greensboro.
