= Georgia State Route 241 =

State highway in Georgia, United States

State Route 241
- SR 241 highlighted in red

Route information
- Maintained by GDOT
- Length: 5.6 mi (9.0 km)
- Existed: 1946–present

Major junctions
- South end: CR 65 at the Florida state line in southern Decatur County
- SR 309 in southern Decatur County
- North end: US 27 Bus. / SR 1 Bus. in Attapulgus

Location
- Country: United States
- State: Georgia
- Counties: Decatur

Highway system
- Georgia State Highway System; Interstate; US; State; Special
← SR 240	→ SR 242

State Route 241 (SR 241) is a 5.6-mile-long (9.0 km) southwest-northeast state highway located in the southwestern part of the U.S. state of Georgia. It exists entirely within Decatur County.

== Route description ==
SR 241 begins at the Florida state line in southern Decatur County, where the roadway continues as County Road 65 (Attapulgus Highway). It heads east-northeast to an intersection with SR 309 (Fowlstown Road). Then, the road curves to the northeast, crossing over Little Attapulgus Creek and a CSX Transportation railroad line. It then heads north-northeast, until it enters Attapulgus, where it meets its northern terminus, an intersection with US 27 Business/SR 1 Business. Here, the roadway continues as Main Street.

No section of SR 241 is part of the National Highway System, a system of routes determined to be the most important for the nation's economy, mobility and defense.

== History ==
SR 241 was established in 1946 along the same alignment as it runs today. Approximately half the route was paved. By 1948, the remainder of the highway was paved.

== Major intersections ==
The entire route is in Decatur County.

Location	mi	km	Destinations	Notes
	0.0	0.0	CR 65 south (Attapulgus Highway) – Quincy	Florida state line
Taylor Crossing	1.2	1.9	SR 309 (Fowlstown Road) – Bainbridge, Havana, FL	
Attapulgus	5.6	9.0	US 27 Bus. / SR 1 Bus. (East Griffin Avenue) – Bainbridge, Tallahassee	Northern terminus; roadway continues as Main Street.
1.000 mi = 1.609 km; 1.000 km = 0.621 mi
