= Sumatra, Florida =

- Unincorporated community
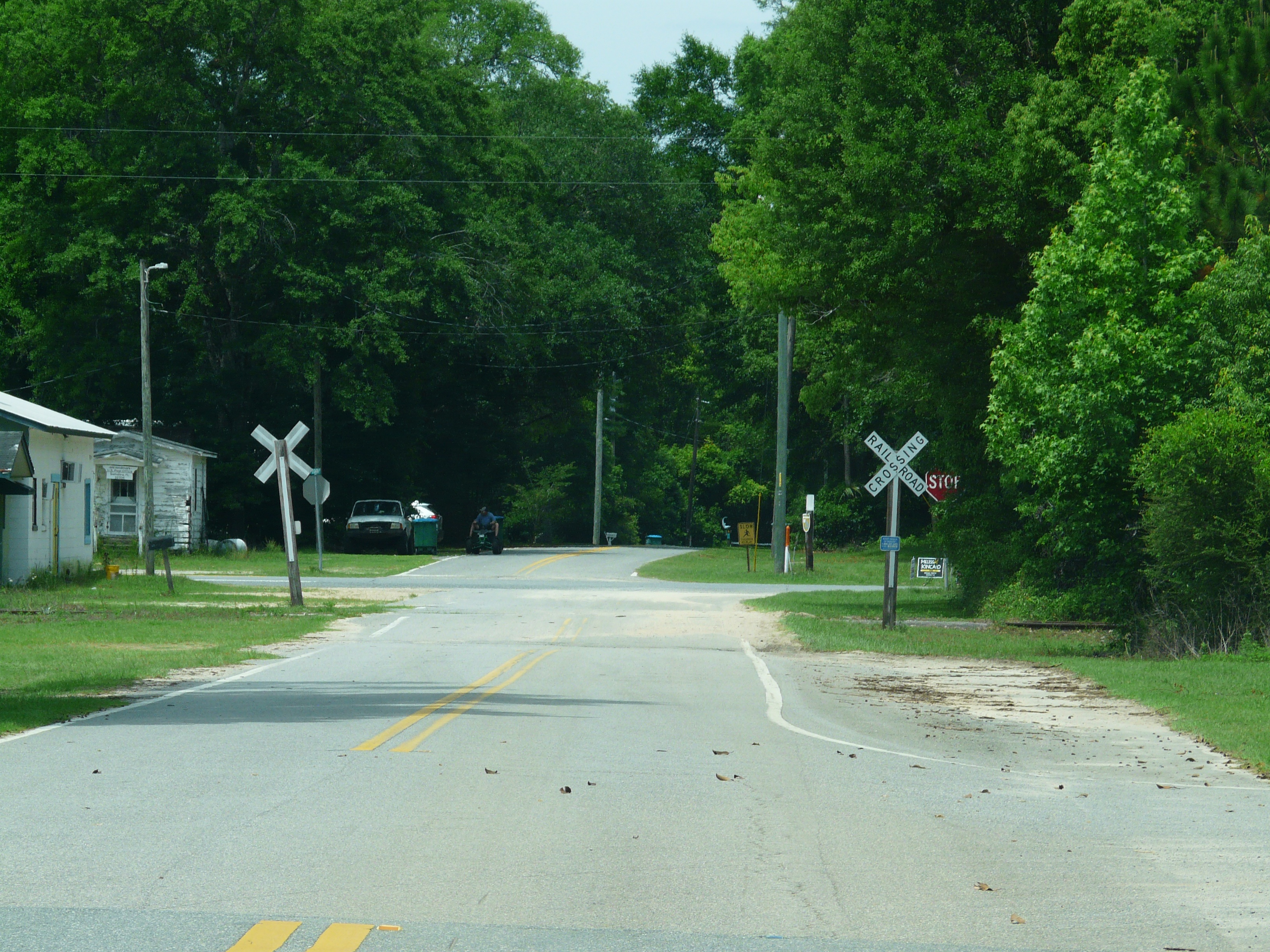
- 8th Street, Sumatra

- Location within Florida Location within the United States
- Coordinates: 30°01′23″N 84°58′57″W
- Country: United States
- State: Florida
- County: Liberty

Area
  - Total: 0.967 sq mi (2.50 km^{2})
  - Land: 0.967 sq mi (2.50 km^{2})
  - Water: 0 sq mi (0 km^{2})
- Elevation: 7 ft (2.1 m)

Population (2020)
  - Total: 148
  - Density: 153/sq mi (59.1/km^{2})
- Time zone: UTC-5 (Eastern (EST))
  - Summer (DST): UTC-4 (EDT)
- ZIP code: 32321
- Area code: 850
- GNIS feature ID: 2628535

Sumatra is an unincorporated community and census-designated place in Liberty County, Florida, United States. Its population was 148 as of the 2020 census, with no change from the 2010 census. It is located on State Road 65. It is approximately 25 miles north of Eastpoint and 35 miles south of Hosford.

The Prospect Bluff Historic Sites are located in Sumatra.

== Demographics ==
Sumatra first appeared as a census designated place in the 2010 U.S. census.
