= Telogia, Florida =

- Unincorporated community
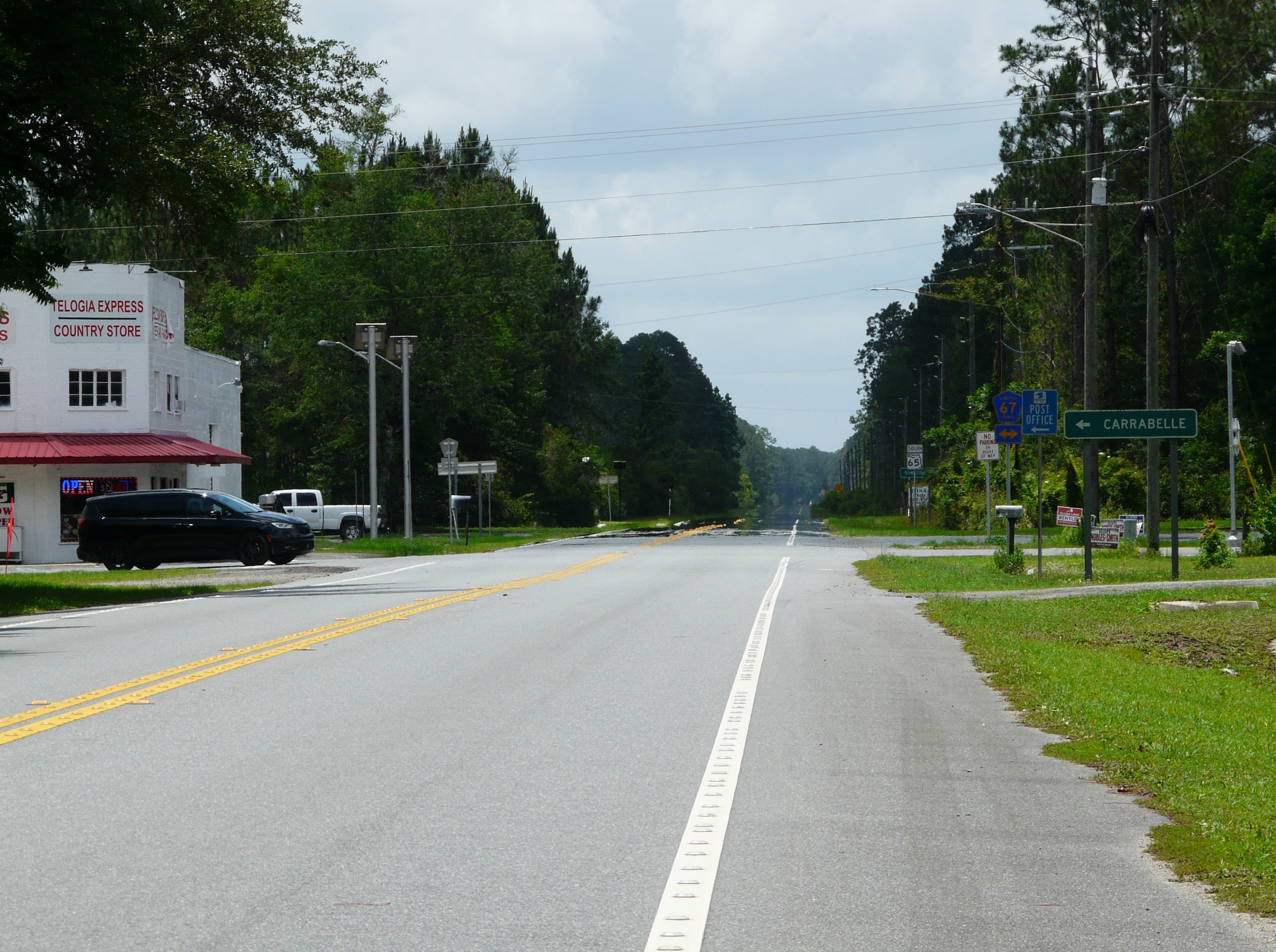
- Telogia, Florida

- Location within Florida Location within the United States
- Coordinates: 30°21′03″N 84°49′09″W
- Country: United States
- State: Florida
- County: Liberty
- Elevation: 115 ft (35 m)
- Time zone: UTC-5 (Eastern (EST))
  - Summer (DST): UTC-4 (EDT)
- ZIP code: 32360
- Area code: 850
- GNIS feature ID: 306486

Telogia is an unincorporated community in Liberty County, Florida, United States. The community is located on Florida State Road 65, 10.9 miles (17.5 km) east-southeast of Bristol. Telogia has a post office with ZIP code 32360.
