= Estiffanulga, Florida =

- Unincorporated community
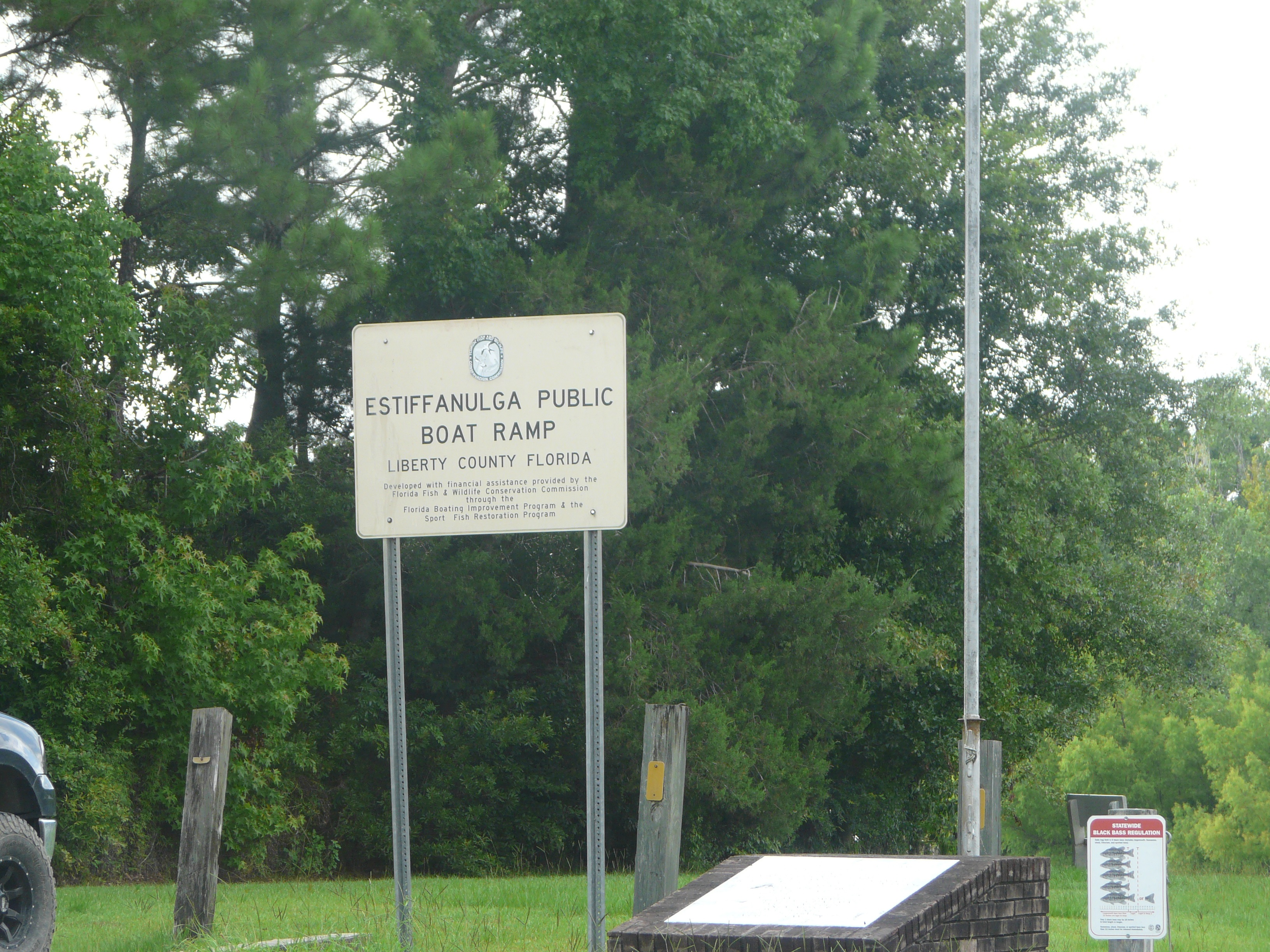
- Boat ramp at Estiffanulga

- Location within Florida
- Coordinates: 30°18′30″N 85°01′57″W
- Country: United States
- State: Florida
- County: Liberty
- Elevation: 59 ft (18 m)
- Time zone: UTC-5 (Eastern (EST))
  - Summer (DST): UTC-4 (EDT)
- Area code: 850
- GNIS feature ID: 305641

Estiffanulga is an unincorporated community in Liberty County, Florida, United States.

Glenn E. Summers (1925-2020), judge, lawyer, and politician, lived in Estiffanulga.
