= The Percys of Mississippi =

The Percys of Mississippi: Politics and Literature in the New South is a 1983 collective biography of the Percy family by Lewis Baker.
