= Red Alexander =

American politician (1903–1969)

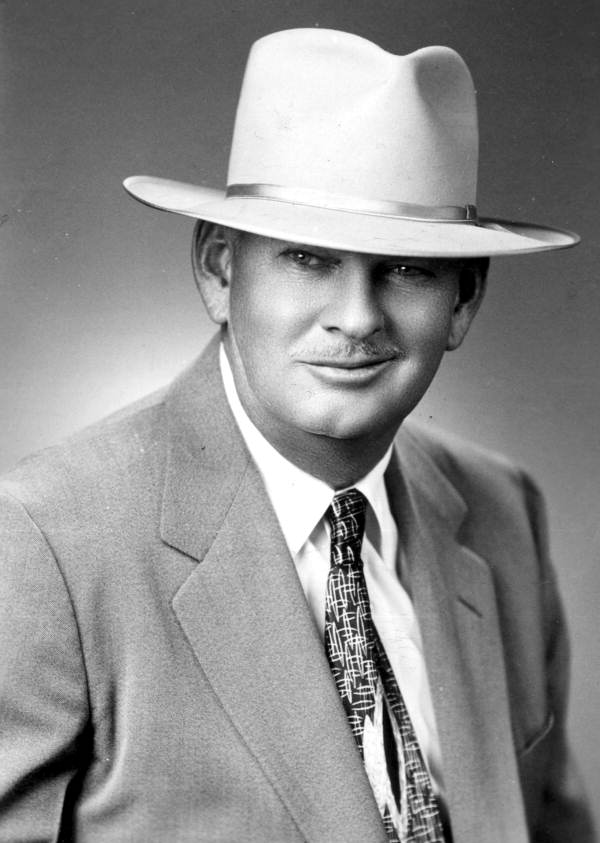

Member of the Florida House of Representatives for Liberty County
- In office 1953–1957

Personal details
- Born: Jake Shuman Alexander; January 3, 1903 Sparks, Georgia, U.S.
- Died: July 28, 1969 (aged 66) Wakulla County, Florida, U.S.
- Party: Democratic
- Education: University of Florida

Jake Shuman "Red" Alexander (January 3, 1903 – July 28, 1969) was a politician in the state of Florida. He served in the Florida House of Representatives from 1953 to 1957, as a Democrat, representing Liberty County. He received a degree in agriculture from the University of Florida.
