= Liberty County School District (Florida) =

Public school district in Florida, United States

Address
- 12926 NW CR 12 Bristol, Liberty, Florida, 32321; United States

District information
- Type: Public
- Grades: K-12
- Superintendent: Kyle Peddie
- NCES District ID: 1201170

Other information
- Website: www.lcsb.org

Liberty County School District is a public school district that covers Liberty County, Florida.

== School Board ==
The District School Board is elected on a non-partisan basis. The Superintendent of Schools is a non-partisan elected position.

== Schools ==
The district operates the following public schools:

=== High school ===
- Liberty County High School

=== Elementary/Junior High Schools ===
- Hosford Elementary and Junior High School
- W.R. Tolar K-8

=== Other programs ===
- Liberty County Adult School
- Horizons
- Early Learning Center
- Bristol Youth Academy
