= Hosford, Florida =

- Unincorporated community
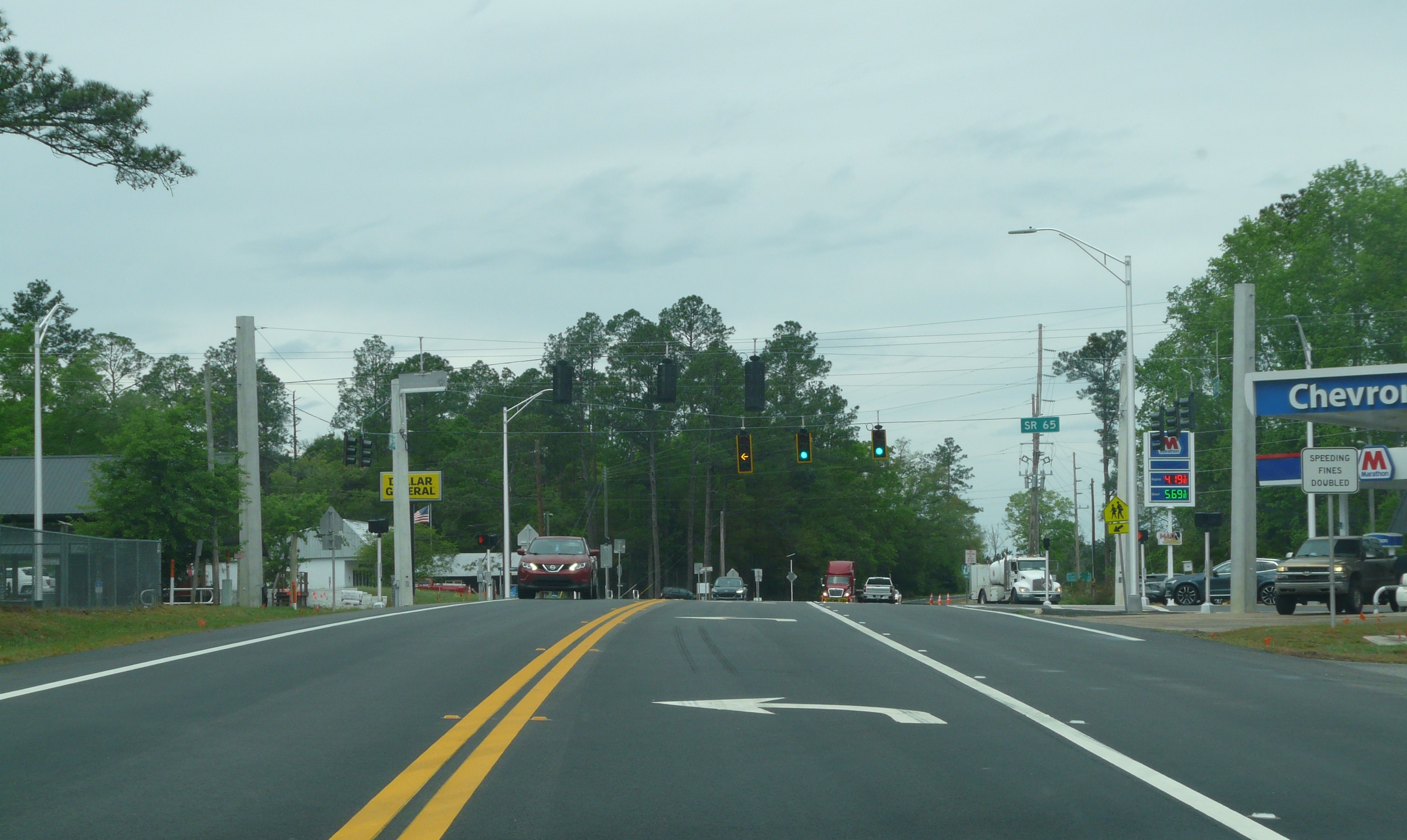
- FL-20 and FL-65 junction

- Location within Florida Location within the United States
- Coordinates: 30°23′12″N 84°47′53″W
- Country: United States
- State: Florida
- County: Liberty

Area
  - Total: 4.972 sq mi (12.88 km^{2})
  - Land: 4.972 sq mi (12.88 km^{2})
  - Water: 0 sq mi (0 km^{2})
- Elevation: 112 ft (34 m)

Population (2020)
  - Total: 629
  - Density: 127/sq mi (48.8/km^{2})
- Time zone: UTC-5 (Eastern (EST))
  - Summer (DST): UTC-4 (EDT)
- Area code: 850
- GNIS feature ID: 2628521

Hosford is an unincorporated community and census-designated place in Liberty County, Florida, United States. Its population was 650 as of the 2020 Census. It is located at the junction of State Road 20 and State Road 65. Hosford has a post office with ZIP Code 32334. It has one school, Hosford Elementary School and Jr. High School, and a public library, Jimmy Weaver Memorial Public Library. Hosford is the site of a Georgia-Pacific mill.

== History ==
Hosford, Florida was originally known as Coe's Mill. It was founded in 1859 and was named for the Coe family. One member of the Coe family, Katherine, married Robert Flournoy Hosford. While Robert Flournoy Hosford worked in the Florida state senate, he helped to convince the railroad to come to Liberty County. In honor of his work in bringing the railroad to Liberty County, the town of Coe's Mill was changed to the town of Hosford.

In 1910, the Hosford Lumber Company filed for bankruptcy. A 1912 article by The Pensacola Journal described Hosford as a "thriving little town." Graves Saw Mill helped foster the growth in Hosford. Visitors to Hosford could stay at the local hotel with electricity and artesian water and visit the local mineral spring. By this time, Hosford already had a local school and local church.

In 1914, Liberty County residents voted 226 to 123 in favor of the county seat being located in Bristol instead of Hosford. Letters patent were issued in July 1916 for the Hosford Coca-Cola Bottling Company, but the charter was forfeited in 1936.

The Graves Saw Mill closed in 1928, which led to a reduction in Hosford's population when saw mill employees moved away.

On April 27, 2023, a tornado struck Hosford, destroying several homes.

== Demographics ==
Hosford first appeared as a census designated place in the 2010 U.S. census.
