= Liberty County, Florida =

County in Florida, United States

- County
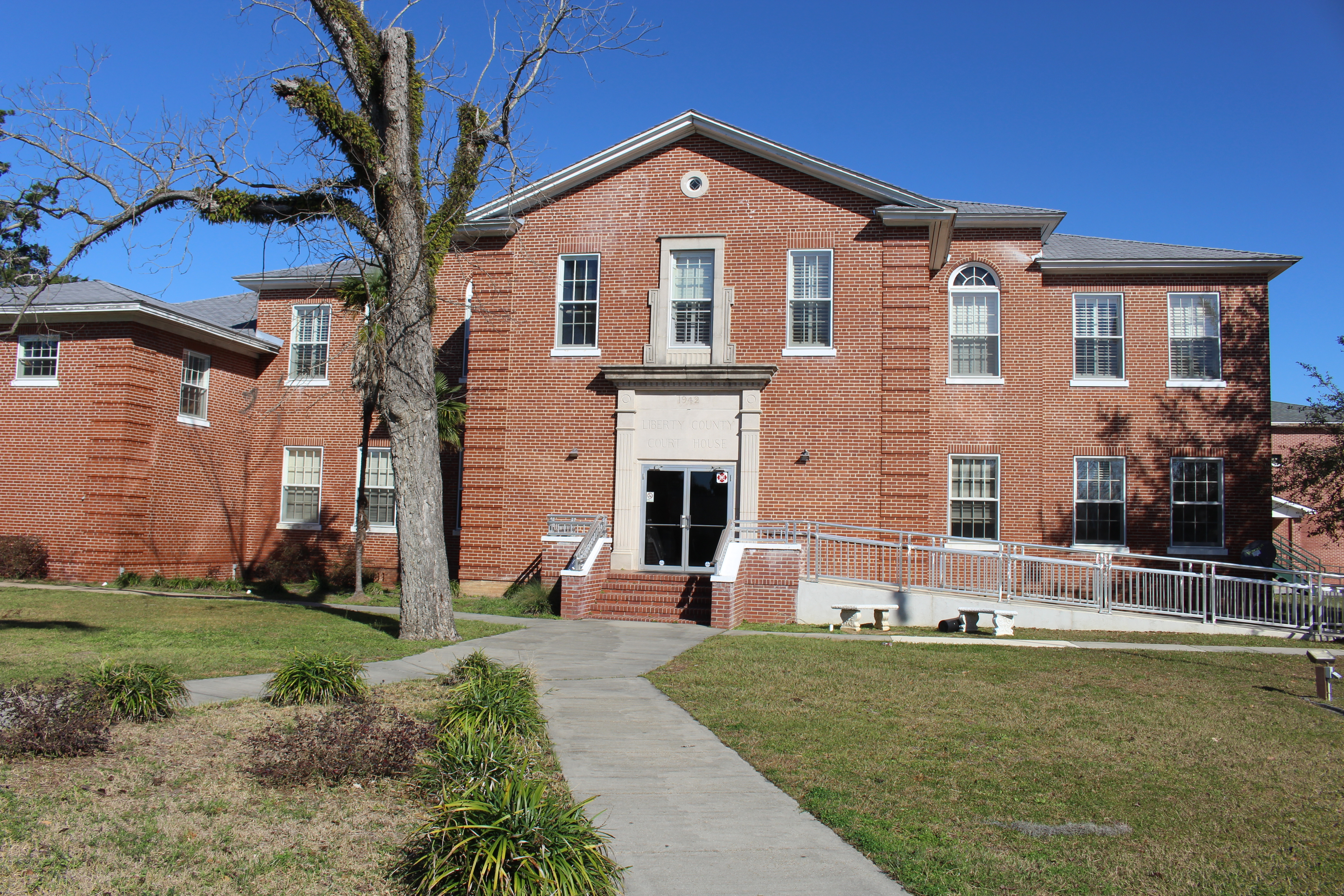
- Liberty County Courthouse

- Location within the U.S. state of Florida
- Coordinates: 30°14′N 84°53′W
- Country: United States
- State: Florida
- Founded: December 15, 1855
- Named for: Liberty
- Seat: Bristol
- Largest town: Bristol

Area
  - Total: 843 sq mi (2,180 km^{2})
  - Land: 836 sq mi (2,170 km^{2})
  - Water: 7.6 sq mi (20 km^{2}) 0.9%

Population (2020)
  - Total: 7,974
  - Estimate (2025): 8,035 ▲
  - Density: 9.54/sq mi (3.68/km^{2})
- Time zone: UTC−5 (Eastern)
  - Summer (DST): UTC−4 (EDT)
- Congressional district: 2nd
- Website: libertycountyfl.org

Liberty County is a county located in the state of Florida, part of the Big Bend region. As of the 2020 census, the population was 7,974, making it the least populous county in Florida. Its county seat is Bristol. Torreya State Park and the Apalachicola National Forest are located within the county. The Apalachicola River runs through the county as well. Liberty County is the only dry county in Florida as Lafayette County prohibits bars, but not retail sale of beer.

== History ==
Liberty County was created in 1855 and is named after the American ideal of liberty. Around 1870, the county mustered a militia company known as the Backwoods Boughs.

== Geography ==
According to the U.S. Census Bureau, the county has a total area of 843 square miles (2,180 km^{2}), of which 836 square miles (2,170 km^{2}) is land and 7.6 square miles (20 km^{2}) (0.9%) is water. The county is bordered on the west by the Apalachicola River.

=== Adjacent counties ===
- Gadsden County - northeast
- Wakulla County - east
- Leon County - east
- Franklin County - south
- Gulf County - southwest
- Calhoun County - west
- Jackson County - northwest

=== National protected area ===
- Apalachicola National Forest (part)

== Demographics ==
Historical population
| Census | Pop. | Note | %± |
|---|---|---|---|
| 1860 | 1,457 | | — |
| 1870 | 1,050 | | −27.9% |
| 1880 | 1,362 | | 29.7% |
| 1890 | 1,452 | | 6.6% |
| 1900 | 2,956 | | 103.6% |
| 1910 | 4,700 | | 59.0% |
| 1920 | 5,006 | | 6.5% |
| 1930 | 4,067 | | −18.8% |
| 1940 | 3,752 | | −7.7% |
| 1950 | 3,182 | | −15.2% |
| 1960 | 3,138 | | −1.4% |
| 1970 | 3,379 | | 7.7% |
| 1980 | 4,260 | | 26.1% |
| 1990 | 5,569 | | 30.7% |
| 2000 | 7,021 | | 26.1% |
| 2010 | 8,365 | | 19.1% |
| 2020 | 7,974 | | −4.7% |
| 2025 (est.) | 8,035 | ▲ | 0.8% |
U.S. Decennial Census; 1790-1960 1900-1990; 1990-2000 2010-2019

=== Racial and ethnic composition ===
Liberty County, Florida – Racial and ethnic composition Note: the US Census treats Hispanic/Latino as an ethnic category. This table excludes Latinos from the racial categories and assigns them to a separate category. Hispanics/Latinos may be of any race.
| Race / Ethnicity (NH = Non-Hispanic) | Pop 1980 | Pop 1990 | Pop 2000 | Pop 2010 | Pop 2020 | % 1980 | % 1990 | % 2000 | % 2010 | % 2020 |
|---|---|---|---|---|---|---|---|---|---|---|
| White alone (NH) | 3,757 | 4,465 | 5,233 | 6,159 | 5,729 | 88.19% | 80.18% | 74.53% | 73.63% | 71.85% |
| Black or African American alone (NH) | 466 | 965 | 1,276 | 1,472 | 1,353 | 10.94% | 17.33% | 18.17% | 17.60% | 16.97% |
| Native American or Alaska Native alone (NH) | 2 | 26 | 114 | 77 | 52 | 0.05% | 0.47% | 1.62% | 0.92% | 0.65% |
| Asian alone (NH) | 5 | 4 | 10 | 16 | 18 | 0.12% | 0.07% | 0.14% | 0.19% | 0.23% |
| Native Hawaiian or Pacific Islander alone (NH) | x | x | 0 | 0 | 1 | x | x | 0.00% | 0.00% | 0.01% |
| Other race alone (NH) | 0 | 1 | 4 | 8 | 26 | 0.00% | 0.02% | 0.06% | 0.10% | 0.33% |
| Mixed race or Multiracial (NH) | x | x | 68 | 115 | 233 | x | x | 0.97% | 1.37% | 2.92% |
| Hispanic or Latino (any race) | 30 | 108 | 316 | 518 | 562 | 0.70% | 1.94% | 4.50% | 6.19% | 7.05% |
| Total | 4,260 | 5,569 | 7,021 | 8,365 | 7,974 | 100.00% | 100.00% | 100.00% | 100.00% | 100.00% |

=== 2020 census ===
As of the 2020 census, the county had a population of 7,974 and 1,602 families. The median age was 39.7 years; 18.4% of residents were under the age of 18 and 14.9% of residents were 65 years of age or older. For every 100 females there were 156.2 males, and for every 100 females age 18 and over there were 170.8 males age 18 and over.

As of the 2020 census, the racial makeup of the county was 74.3% White, 17.0% Black or African American, 0.8% American Indian and Alaska Native, 0.2% Asian, <0.1% Native Hawaiian and Pacific Islander, 3.5% from some other race, and 4.1% from two or more races. Hispanic or Latino residents of any race comprised 7.0% of the population.

As of the 2020 census, <0.1% of residents lived in urban areas, while 100.0% lived in rural areas.

As of the 2020 census, there were 2,491 households in the county, of which 33.1% had children under the age of 18 living in them. Of all households, 47.1% were married-couple households, 21.1% were households with a male householder and no spouse or partner present, and 25.9% were households with a female householder and no spouse or partner present. About 28.8% of all households were made up of individuals and 12.9% had someone living alone who was 65 years of age or older.

As of the 2020 census, there were 3,196 housing units, of which 22.1% were vacant. Among occupied housing units, 76.7% were owner-occupied and 23.3% were renter-occupied. The homeowner vacancy rate was 1.7% and the rental vacancy rate was 10.7%.

=== 2000 census ===
As of the census of 2000, there were 7,021 people, 2,222 households, and 1,553 families residing in the county. The population density was 8 people per square mile (3.1 people/km^{2}). There were 3,156 housing units at an average density of 4 per square mile (1.5/km^{2}). The racial makeup of the county was 76.41% White, 18.43% Black or African American, 1.81% Native American, 0.14% Asian, 2.08% from other races, and 1.13% from two or more races. 4.50% of the population were Hispanic or Latino of any race. More than 10% of the population are Mormons.

There were 2,222 households, out of which 34.20% had children under the age of 18 living with them, 51.80% were married couples living together, 13.20% had a female householder with no husband present, and 30.10% were non-families. 25.90% of all households were made up of individuals, and 10.60% had someone living alone who was 65 years of age or older. The average household size was 2.51 and the average family size was 3.00.

In the county, the population was spread out, with 21.80% under the age of 18, 9.40% from 18 to 24, 37.70% from 25 to 44, 21.00% from 45 to 64, and 10.20% who were 65 years of age or older. The median age was 35 years. For every 100 females there were 144.90 males. For every 100 females age 18 and over, there were 159.50 males.

The median income for a household in the county was $28,840, and the median income for a family was $34,244. Males had a median income of $22,078 versus $22,661 for females. The per capita income for the county was $17,225. About 16.80% of families and 19.90% of the population were below the poverty line, including 24.30% of those under age 18 and 24.30% of those age 65 or over.

== Politics ==
Liberty County has shifted rapidly towards the Republican Party in the 21st century. As of 2025, Republicans maintain an advantage in voter registration, which is the case in all but four counties in the Panhandle. As recently as 2016, Liberty County had 3,399 registered Democrats and just 722 registered Republicans, although it has consistently voted for Republican candidates, last supporting a Democrat with Jimmy Carter.

United States presidential election results for Liberty County, Florida
| Year | Republican | | Democratic | | Third party(ies) | |
| Year | No. | % | No. | % | No. | % |
|---|---|---|---|---|---|---|
| 1904 | 50 | 24.88% | 143 | 71.14% | 8 | 3.98% |
| 1908 | 69 | 25.27% | 176 | 64.47% | 28 | 10.26% |
| 1912 | 32 | 12.08% | 206 | 77.74% | 27 | 10.19% |
| 1916 | 57 | 14.65% | 280 | 71.98% | 52 | 13.37% |
| 1920 | 5 | 1.10% | 416 | 91.63% | 33 | 7.27% |
| 1924 | 18 | 8.04% | 193 | 86.16% | 13 | 5.80% |
| 1928 | 147 | 39.20% | 226 | 60.27% | 2 | 0.53% |
| 1932 | 31 | 4.35% | 682 | 95.65% | 0 | 0.00% |
| 1936 | 64 | 7.41% | 800 | 92.59% | 0 | 0.00% |
| 1940 | 119 | 11.16% | 947 | 88.84% | 0 | 0.00% |
| 1944 | 38 | 5.72% | 626 | 94.28% | 0 | 0.00% |
| 1948 | 30 | 3.53% | 737 | 86.81% | 82 | 9.66% |
| 1952 | 237 | 18.60% | 1,037 | 81.40% | 0 | 0.00% |
| 1956 | 238 | 21.48% | 870 | 78.52% | 0 | 0.00% |
| 1960 | 243 | 21.99% | 862 | 78.01% | 0 | 0.00% |
| 1964 | 910 | 70.71% | 377 | 29.29% | 0 | 0.00% |
| 1968 | 154 | 8.96% | 242 | 14.09% | 1,322 | 76.95% |
| 1972 | 1,199 | 84.38% | 222 | 15.62% | 0 | 0.00% |
| 1976 | 620 | 34.91% | 1,137 | 64.02% | 19 | 1.07% |
| 1980 | 899 | 43.81% | 1,114 | 54.29% | 39 | 1.90% |
| 1984 | 1,410 | 68.45% | 650 | 31.55% | 0 | 0.00% |
| 1988 | 1,421 | 65.27% | 709 | 32.57% | 47 | 2.16% |
| 1992 | 1,126 | 43.71% | 820 | 31.83% | 630 | 24.46% |
| 1996 | 913 | 42.19% | 868 | 40.11% | 383 | 17.70% |
| 2000 | 1,317 | 54.65% | 1,017 | 42.20% | 76 | 3.15% |
| 2004 | 1,927 | 63.79% | 1,070 | 35.42% | 24 | 0.79% |
| 2008 | 2,339 | 71.18% | 895 | 27.24% | 52 | 1.58% |
| 2012 | 2,301 | 69.96% | 942 | 28.64% | 46 | 1.40% |
| 2016 | 2,543 | 76.78% | 651 | 19.66% | 118 | 3.56% |
| 2020 | 2,846 | 79.83% | 694 | 19.47% | 25 | 0.70% |
| 2024 | 2,898 | 82.89% | 566 | 16.19% | 32 | 0.92% |

| Political Party | Number of registered voters (February 28, 2026) | % |
|---|---|---|
| Republican | 2,825 | 62.69% |
| Democratic | 1,199 | 26.61% |
| Independent | 458 | 10.16% |
| Other | 24 | 0.53% |
| Total | 4,506 | 100.00% |

Liberty County is run by a board of five county commissioners, each elected at-large. Terms for these offices begin on the second Tuesday following the general election. The following is a list of the commissioners with the number representative of his/her district:

1. Dewayne Branch (R)
2. Walter "Buddy" Money (R) - interim
3. Jim Johnson (R)
4. Doyle Brown (R)
5. Derrick Arnold (D)

The school board is run by five members, each also elected at-large in non-partisan elections. Terms for these offices begin on the second Tuesday following the general election. The following is a list of the school board with the number representative of his/her district:

1. Mason Kever
2. Jodi Bailey
3. Darrel Hayes
4. Jason Singletary
5. Charles Morris

The remaining elected officials are the constitutional officers. Terms for these offices begin on the first Tuesday after the first Monday in January following the general election except for the role of Superintendent of Schools which begins on the second Tuesday following the general election, in coordination with elected school board members.

- County Judge: Christopher D. Bufano
- Clerk of Court: Jace Ford (R)
- Sheriff: Dusty Arnold (R)
- Property Appraiser: Chris Rudd (R)
- Tax Collector: Marie Goodman (R)
- Supervisor of Elections: Grant Conyers (R)
- Superintendent of Schools: Kyle Peddie (R)

== Library ==
Liberty County is part of the Northwest Regional Library System, which serves Gulf and Bay counties as well.

== Communities ==
=== Town ===
- Bristol

=== Census-designated places ===
- Hosford
- Lake Mystic
- Sumatra

=== Unincorporated communities ===
- Estiffanulga
- Orange
- Rock Bluff
- Telogia
- White Springs
- Wilma
- Woods

== Transportation ==
Much like Calhoun County, Liberty County has no Interstates or U.S. Highways, just state and county roads.

- SR 20 is the main west-to-east route that runs east from the Apalachicola River at the Calhoun/Liberty County line to the Ochlockonee River at the Liberty/Leon County line, passing through Bristol and Hosford.
- SR 65 is the main south-to-north route running from the Franklin/Liberty County line at Sumatra to the Liberty/Gadsden County line north of Hosford.
- SR 12 is a southwest-to-southeast route running from Liberty County in the southwest to Havana in the northeast. It also contains a county extension into Levy County.
- SR 267 briefly runs alongside state road 20 until it splits away shortly after crossing the Leon/Liberty county line and heads north towards Quincy.

== Education ==
Public education is provided by the Liberty County School District. Included in the District is the Liberty County High School.

== See also ==
- Dry counties
- National Register of Historic Places listings in Liberty County, Florida
