= Bristol, Florida =

- City
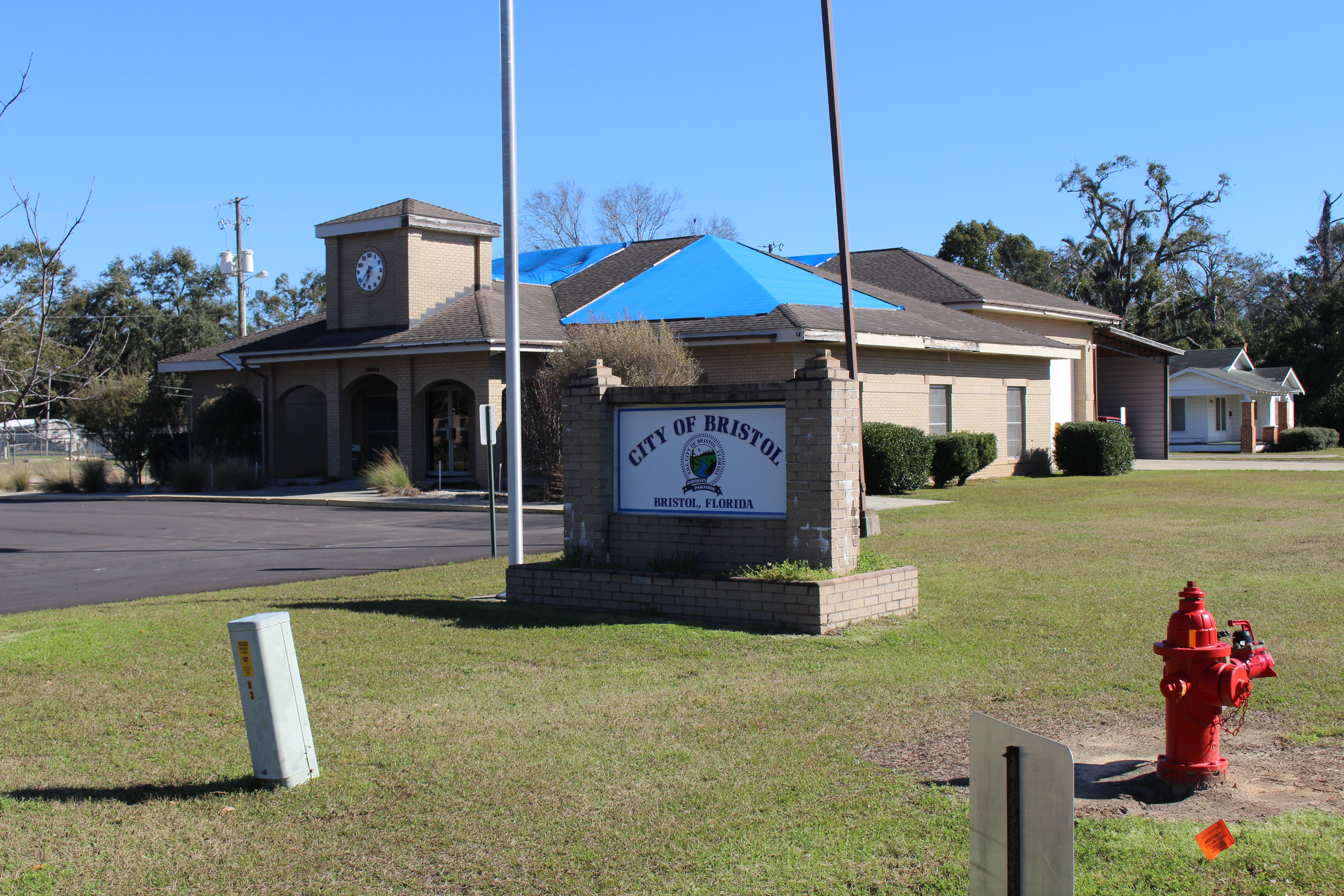
- Bristol City Hall and Fire Station

- Location in Liberty County and the state of Florida
- Coordinates: 30°25′32″N 84°58′38″W
- Country: United States
- State: Florida
- County: Liberty
- Settled: 1859
- Incorporated: June 19, 1958

Government
  - Type: Mayor-Council
  - Mayor: James P. Kersey
  - Council Chair: Thomas "Tommy" Rankin
  - Councilmembers: Micah McCaskill, Tara Miller, and Council Vice Chair Mattie "Janie" Boyd
  - City Clerk: Christian "Chris" Vowell
  - City Attorneys: Dan Hartman and Joshua Pasqualone

Area
  - Total: 1.64 sq mi (4.24 km^{2})
  - Land: 1.64 sq mi (4.24 km^{2})
  - Water: 0 sq mi (0.00 km^{2})
- Elevation: 164 ft (50 m)

Population (2020)
  - Total: 918
  - Density: 560.5/sq mi (216.41/km^{2})
- Time zone: UTC-5 (Eastern (EST))
  - Summer (DST): UTC-4 (EDT)
- ZIP code: 32321
- Area code(s): 850, 448
- FIPS code: 12-08600
- GNIS feature ID: 2403928
- Website: cityofbristolfl.gov

Bristol is a city in and the county seat of Liberty County, Florida, United States. It is the only incorporated city in Liberty County. The population was 918 at the 2020 census.

== History ==
Bristol was first settled in 1859, and started with a population of 300, with the purpose of being the county seat of Liberty County. The community consisted of one general store, three sawmills, three gristmills, a hotel, a Baptist church, a Methodist church, and a Presbyterian church. An American pioneer named Moses Strause, who was one of the first non-indigenous settlers, deeded land to the county on which a small log building that Strause built was converted into the county's first courthouse. During that time, the prices of land ranged from $2.00 to $25.00 per acre (0.404686 hectare).

The post office's first postmaster, D.G. Harrell, had mail brought in by boat from Columbus, Georgia to Apalachicola, Florida on Mondays and Thursdays, and the principal exports were beeswax, cotton, hides, honey, and oranges. The closest railroad and express office was located in Chattahoochee, Florida, while closest bank during that time was 42 miles (67.5924 kilometres) away, in Tallahassee.

Despite being in existence since 1859, it wasn't until June 19, 1958, when the City of Bristol was officially incorporated as a municipality.

=== Claimed Garden of Eden site ===
A widely reported claim was once made by Elvy E. Callaway, (who was a former pro-NAACP lawyer, a former Baptist minister, and a former gubernatorial candidate who ran as a Republican for Florida governor in the 1936 election), stated that the site of the Biblical Garden of Eden lay in northern Liberty County. He cited as evidence the Apalachicola River, with its four river heads, and local sources of torreya known as Florida torreya (Torreya taxifolia), which he claimed was gopher wood, the material said to have been used by Noah in constructing his ark. Callaway transformed the area into a tourist attraction, specifically a roadside attraction, that he owned and operated from 1956 until his death, in 1981. Soon after his 1981 passing, The Nature Conservancy took ownership of the land and its forest (with its rare, critically endangered species of torreya), renaming it the Apalachicola Bluffs and Ravines Preserve, while keeping the original name of the entrance path to the nature preserve as Garden of Eden Road, and also retaining the name for the Garden of Eden Trail.

== Geography ==
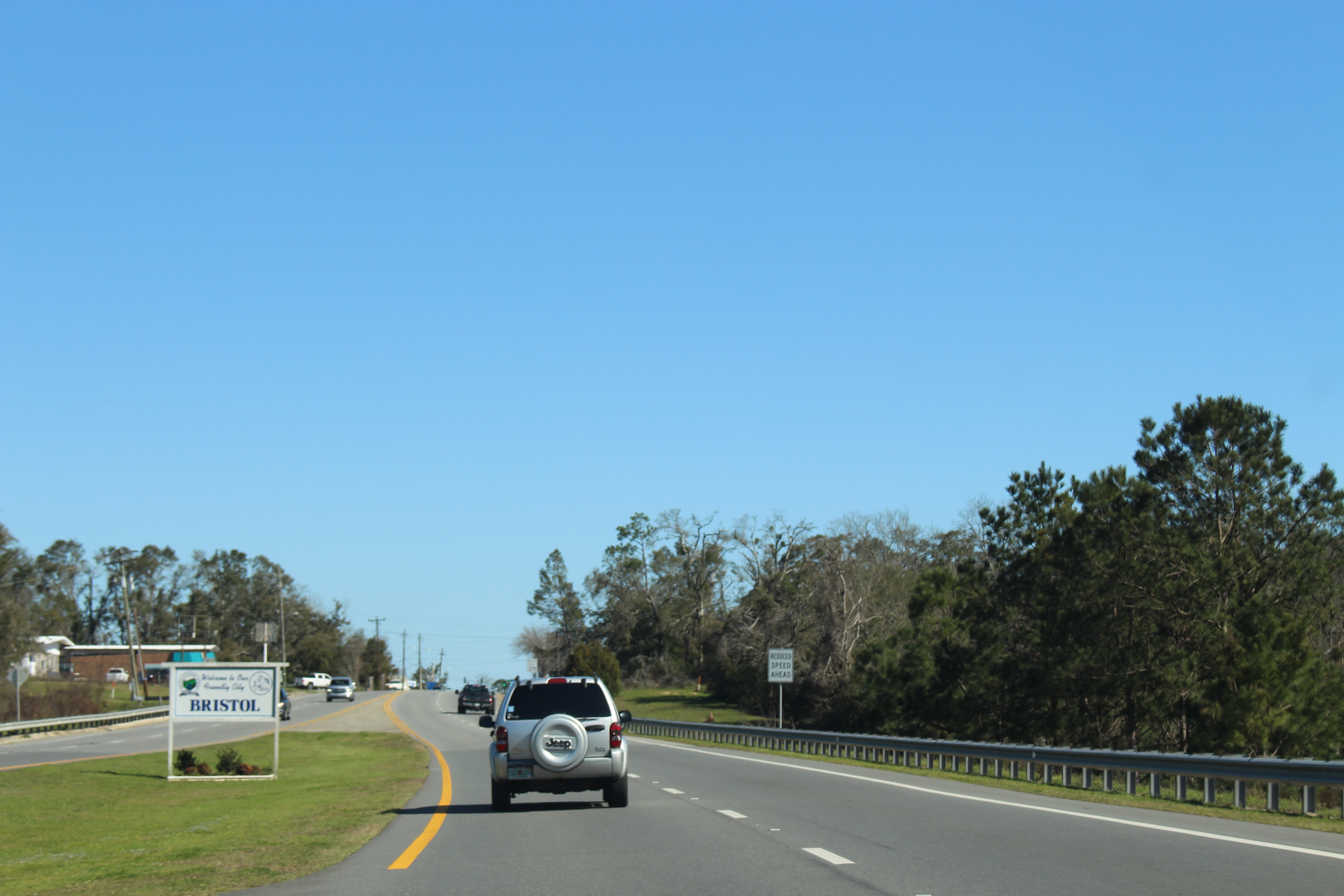
Bristol welcome sign

The approximate coordinates for the City of Bristol is located in northwestern Liberty County at 30°25′37″N 84°58′45″W, in the Florida Panhandle part of North Florida along the Big Bend region.

It sits atop a 150-foot-high (46 m) bluff overlooking the eastern side of the Apalachicola River. Florida State Road 20 passes through the city, leading west 4 miles (6 km) to Blountstown and east 44 miles (71 km) to Tallahassee, the state capital. Florida State Road 12 leads northeast from Bristol 18 miles (29 km) to Greensboro.

According to the United States Census Bureau, Bristol has a total area of 1.6 square miles (4.2 km^{2}), all land.

=== Climate ===
Like nearly all of the Deep South, the climate in this area is characterized by hot, humid summers and generally mild winters. According to the Köppen climate classification, the City of Bristol has a humid subtropical climate zone (Cfa).

Climate data for Bristol, Florida
Month	Jan	Feb	Mar	Apr	May	Jun	Jul	Aug	Sep	Oct	Nov	Dec	Year
Record high °F (°C)	83 (28)	85 (29)	90 (32)	92 (33)	100 (38)	102 (39)	102 (39)	101 (38)	98 (37)	95 (35)	87 (31)	84 (29)	102 (39)
Mean daily maximum °F (°C)	64 (18)	67 (19)	74 (23)	79 (26)	86 (30)	90 (32)	91 (33)	90 (32)	88 (31)	81 (27)	73 (23)	66 (19)	79 (26)
Daily mean °F (°C)	52 (11)	55 (13)	61 (16)	66 (19)	74 (23)	79 (26)	81 (27)	80 (27)	77 (25)	69 (21)	61 (16)	54 (12)	67 (20)
Mean daily minimum °F (°C)	40 (4)	42 (6)	48 (9)	52 (11)	61 (16)	68 (20)	71 (22)	70 (21)	66 (19)	57 (14)	49 (9)	42 (6)	56 (13)
Record low °F (°C)	4 (−16)	0 (−18)	19 (−7)	31 (−1)	36 (2)	49 (9)	60 (16)	59 (15)	48 (9)	33 (1)	20 (−7)	12 (−11)	0 (−18)
Average rainfall inches (mm)	4.80 (122)	4.92 (125)	5.86 (149)	3.68 (93)	5.04 (128)	5.92 (150)	7.36 (187)	6.78 (172)	4.15 (105)	4.11 (104)	3.51 (89)	3.77 (96)	59.9 (1,520)
Source: The Weather Channel

== Demographics ==
Historical population
Census	Pop.	Note	%±
1960	614		—
1970	626		2.0%
1980	1,044		66.8%
1990	937		−10.2%
2000	845		−9.8%
2010	996		17.9%
2020	918		−7.8%
U.S. Decennial Census

=== 2010 and 2020 census ===
Bristol racial composition (Hispanics excluded from racial categories) (NH = Non-Hispanic)
Race	Pop 2010	Pop 2020	% 2010	% 2020
White (NH)	797	712	80.02%	77.56%
Black or African American (NH)	95	72	9.54%	7.84%
Native American or Alaska Native (NH)	13	6	1.31%	0.65%
Asian (NH)	2	6	0.20%	0.65%
Pacific Islander or Native Hawaiian (NH)	0	1	0.00%	0.11%
Some other race (NH)	0	7	0.00%	0.76%
Two or more races/Multiracial (NH)	14	24	1.41%	2.61%
Hispanic or Latino (any race)	75	90	7.53%	9.80%
Total	996	918		

As of the 2020 United States census, there were 918 people, 352 households, and 210 families residing in the city.

As of the 2010 United States census, there were 996 people, 322 households, and 183 families residing in the city.

=== 2000 census ===
As of the census of 2000, there were 845 people, 326 households, and 235 families residing in the city. The population density was 517.1 inhabitants per square mile (199.7/km^{2}). There were 393 housing units at an average density of 240.5 per square mile (92.9/km^{2}). The racial makeup of the city was 87.22% White, 3.79% African American, 1.78% Native American, 5.44% from other races, and 1.78% from two or more races. Hispanic or Latino of any race were 5.80% of the population.

There were 326 households, out of which 30.7% had children under the age of 18 living with them, 52.8% were married couples living together, 14.1% had a female householder with no husband present, and 27.9% were non-families. 25.8% of all households were made up of individuals, and 12.0% had someone living alone who was 65 years of age or older. The average household size was 2.48 and the average family size was 2.91.

In the city, the population was spread out, with 24.9% under the age of 18, 8.5% from 18 to 24, 25.6% from 25 to 44, 24.5% from 45 to 64, and 16.6% who were 65 years of age or older. The median age was 39 years. For every 100 females, there were 88.2 males. For every 100 females age 18 and over, there were 87.3 males.

The median income for a household in the city was $31,607, and the median income for a family was $36,932. Males had a median income of $26,473 versus $22,500 for females. The per capita income for the city was $17,949. About 14.8% of families and 19.8% of the population were below the poverty line, including 24.9% of those under age 18 and 15.5% of those age 65 or over.

== Education ==
All public schools in Bristol are served by Liberty County School District.

Two schools are based in Bristol:

- Liberty County High School
- W.R. Tolar Elementary and Middle School (K-8).

== Parks and recreation ==
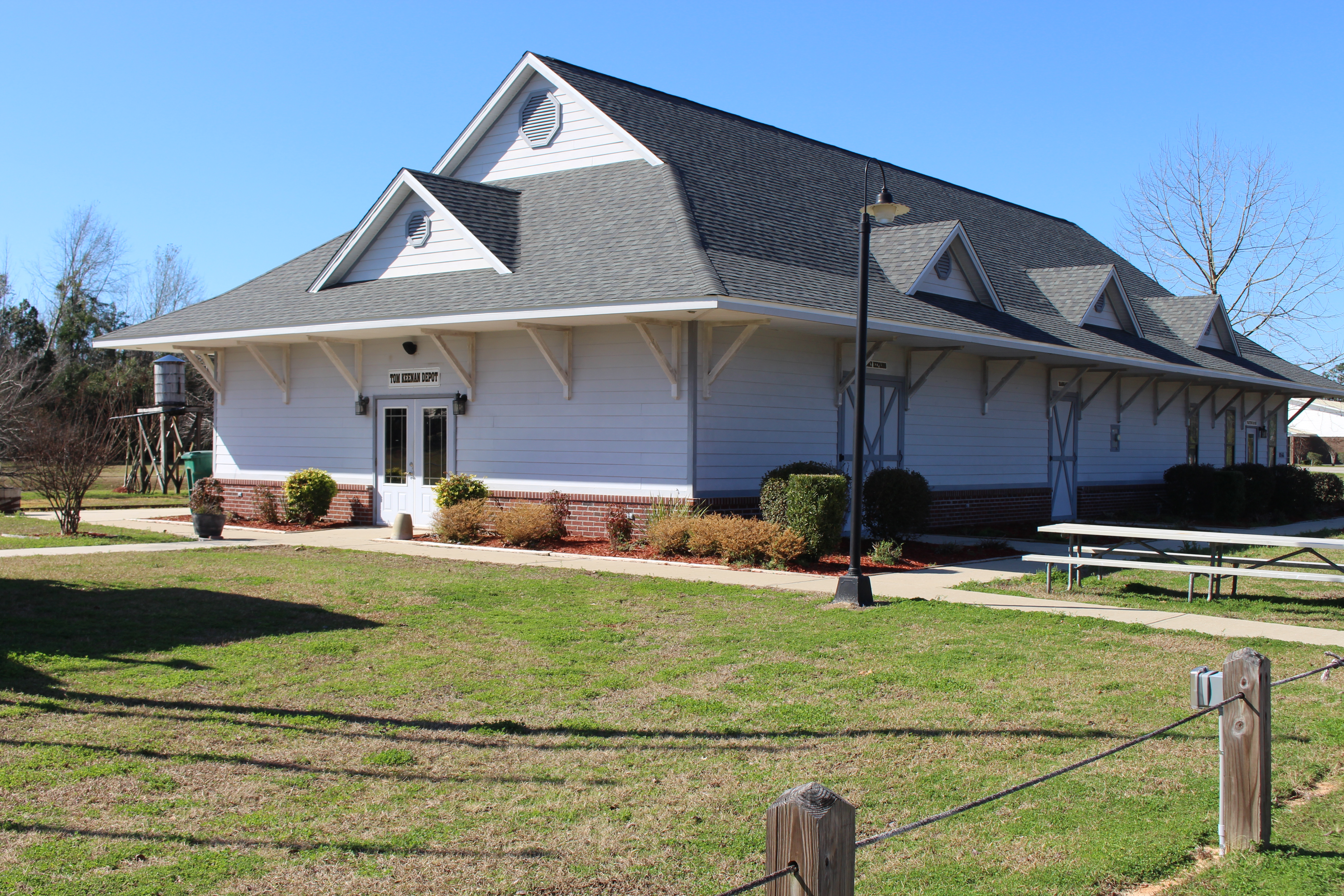
Tom Keenan Depot at Veterans Memorial Park

- Apalachicola National Forest
  - Florida Trail
  - Wright Lake Recreation Area
- Apalachicola River
  - Bristol Landing
- Beaverdam Creek Wildlife Management Area
  - Beaverdam Creek Tract (Canoeing Area)
- Torreya State Park
  - Bluff Rock
  - Gregory House
  - Sweetwater Plantation (Deer Habitat)
  - Weeping Ridge Campground
- The Nature Conservancy Apalachicola Bluffs and Ravines Preserve
  - Alum Bluff
  - Garden of Eden Trail
- Trammell Bridge
- Veterans Memorial Park, one notable feature of the park is the 2 ft (610 mm) narrow-gauge Veterans Memorial Railroad, operating multiple types of locomotives including a coal-powered steam locomotive built by Crown Metal Products.
