= List of county roads in Jackson County, Florida =

- County road shields used in Florida

Highway names
- Interstates: Interstate X (I-X)
- US Highways: U.S. Highway X (US X)
- State: State Road X (SR X)
- County: County Road X (CR-X)

System links
- County roads in Florida; County roads in Jackson County

The following is a list of county roads in Jackson County, Florida. All county roads are maintained by the county in which they reside. Not all county roads contain shields, nor are all of them paved.

== County roads in Jackson County ==
| Route | Road Name(s) | From | To | Notes |
|---|---|---|---|---|
| CR 2A | Old Highway 2 | SR 2 in Campbellton | US 231 (SR 75) in Campbellton | Former SR 2 |
| CR 10A | Old Cottondale Road Keevers Road; Old Spanish Trail; Legion Road | US 90 (SR 10) west of Marianna US 90 (SR 10) west of Sneads | US 90 (SR 10) in Marianna US 90 (SR 10) in Sneads | Unsigned; former SR 10A |
| CR 69A | Orlando Road Birchwood Road; Shady Grove Road Inwood Road; El Bethel Church Road; Sandridge Church Road Wintergreen Road; Lovedale Road | CR 69A at the Calhoun County line east-southeast of Alliance SR 69 / CR 278 west-southwest of Shady Grove CSX railroad line in Inwood SR 69 in Two Egg | CR 275 / CR 278 east-northeast of Alliance SR 69 in Grand Ridge Butler Road / Sandridge Church Road southeast of Dellwood CR 164 / Cox Road east-northeast of Lovedale | Dirt road Former SR 69A Former SR 69A Former SR 69A |
| CR 75A | Dryer Street | US 231 (SR 75) in Round Lake | US 231 (SR 75) in Round Lake | |
| CR 162 | Tri-County Road; Galilee Road; Cliff Road; Rachel Road Jacob Road; Fort Road | CR 162 at the Holmes County line south-southwest of Hicks Hill SR 273 / Sharon Road west-northwest of Jacob City | SR 273 northwest of Glass SR 69 / SR 71 | Former SR 162 |
| CR 164 | Lovewood Road Blue Springs Road; Lovedale Road Timberlane Road | CR 277 south-southeast of Hicks Hill SR 71 east of Marianna CR 69A / Cox east-northeast of Lovedale | CR 169 north-northwest of Cottondale SR 69 / Messer Road in Dellwood CR 95 at the Alabama state line at Chattahoochee State Park north-northeast of Bascom | Former SR 164 |
| CR 164A | Reddoch Road | CR 164 east-northeast of Marianna | SR 69 / Providence Church Road north of Grand Ridge | Former SR 164A |
| CR 164B | Hummingbird Road | SR 71 south of Malone | CR 165 / Hummingbird Road in Bascom | Former SR 164B; no connection to CR 164 |
| CR 165 | Basswood Road | SR 71 in Greenwood | SR 2 east of Malone | Former SR 165 |
| CR 165A | Wintergreen Road | CR 69A / Nubbin Ridge Road west of Lovedale | CR 165 in Bascom | Former SR 165A |
| CR 167 | Fairview Road Old U.S. Road | CR 167 / Freedom Road at the Calhoun County line south-southeast of Round Lake SR 166 north-northeast of Marianna | SR 276 in Marianna Old U.S. Road at the Alabama state line northwest of Malone | Former SR 167 |
| CR 169 | Peanut Road; Cliff Street | US 231 (SR 75) north of Cottondale | SR 2 / Cliff Street in Graceville | Former SR 169 |
| CR 193 | Smokey Road; Browntown Road; Sanders Road | SR 273 / Smokey Road north-northeast of Richter Crossroads | SR 77 in Graceville | Former SR 193 |
| CR 195 | Sapp Road | CR 280 / Sapp Road west of Steele City | US 90 (SR 10) west-southwest of Cottondale | Former SR 195 |
| CR 264 | Suncrest Road | SR 71 in Rock Creek | CR 275 north-northeast of Alliance | Former SR 264 |
| CR 264A | Mockingbird Road | CR 264 east of Rock Creek | CR 280 northeast of Rock Creek | Former SR 264 |
| CR 271 | Gulf Power Road River Road | Gulf Power Road southeast of Sneads US 90 (SR 10) / River Road in Sneads | US 90 (SR 10) / A.C.I. Entrance Road east of Sneads CR 164 north-northwest of Hornsville | Former SR 271 |
| CR 275 | Flamingo Road; Alliance Road; Church Street | CR 275 at the Calhoun County line east-southeast of Alliance | US 90 (SR 10) / Dellwood–Cypress Road in Cypress | Former SR 275 |
| CR 276 | Park Road Kynesville Road | CR 276 at the Washington County line west of Alford US 231 (SR 75) in Steele City | US 231 (SR 75) / Park Avenue in Alford SR 276 / CR 167 in Marianna | Former SR 276 |
| CR 277 | Earlston Road; Tri-County Road; Piano Road Reddick Mill Road Woodham Road; Spruce Road | CR 277 at the Washington County line south-southeast of Hicks Hill Sloan Road / Reddick Mill Road north-northeast of Hicks Hill Woodham Road at the Holmes County line southwest of Graceville | SR 77 south of Graceville CR 277 northeast of Hicks Hill CR 277 | Former SR 277 Unsigned Unsigned |
| CR 278 | Peacock Bridge Road Alliance Road; Birchwood Road Laramore Road | SR 73 west-northwest of Sink Creek SR 71 / Alliance Road in Sink Creek CR 167 east-northeast of Round Lake | SR 71 in Sink Creek SR 69 / CR 69A southwest of Shady Grove SR 73 west-northwest of Simsville | Former SR 278 |
| CR 280 | Corbin Road Thompson Road; Magnolia Road; Hope School Drive; Rocky Creek Road Shady Grove Road | CR 280 at the Washington County line northwest of Alford SR 73 / Thompson Road south of Marianna CR 69A in Shady Grove | US 231 (SR 75) in Steele City CR 275 south of Cypress CR 286 / Hill Farm Road south of Sneads | Former SR 280 |
| CR 280A | Fillmore Drive | Dead end south-southeast of Marianna | SR 73 south of Marianna | Former SR 280A |
| CR 286 | Blueberry Drive; Gloster Avenue | CR 286 at the Calhoun County line south-southeast of Shady Grove | US 90 (SR 10) / Gloster Avenue in Sneads | Former SR 286 |
| CR 1656 | 3rd Avenue; Gardenview Road | US 231 (SR 75) / 3rd Avenue in Alford | CR 167 southwest of Marianna | Former SR 276A |
