= Holmes Creek (Florida) =

Stream in Florida panhandle

Physical characteristics
- Source: Southern Alabama
  - location: near Graceville, Florida
- Mouth: Choctawhatchee River
  - location: West of Ebro, Florida
  - coordinates: 30°29′52″N 85°51′36″W
- Length: 56 miles (90 km)
- Basin size: 220 square miles (570 km^{2})

Basin features
- Tributaries
  - left: Becton Spring, Hard Labor Creek, Minnow Creek
  - right: Cypress Creek
- Bridges: State Road 2, U.S. 90, I-10, Washington County Road 166, Washington County Road 276A, State Road 79

Holmes Creek is a tributary of the Choctawhatchee River in the Florida panhandle. The lower half of the stream is fed by many springs, is designated as a paddling trail, and is home to an unusual diversity of freshwater snails.

== Name ==
The stream was labeled Weekaywehatchee on a 1778 map, from Muscogee wekiwa ("spring") and hatchee ("river"). The area was known as "Holmes Valley" by 1818 during the First Seminole War, when a party sent from Andrew Jackson's invading force raided the "Uchee and Holmes old fields" near the Choctawhatchee River and killed a red-stick Muscogee leader known to whites as "Holmes". Holmes County, Florida was named for the river when it was established in 1848. There is no documentary evidence for the claim that the stream is named for a man who settled in the area in the 1830s.

== Course ==
Holmes Creek rises in southern Alabama, 4 miles (6.4 km) north of the border with Florida and 6 miles (9.7 km) north of Graceville, Florida. It flows in a southwest direction through Florida, forming the boundary between Holmes County and Jackson County and part of the boundary between Holmes County and Washington County, and then through Washington County to its juncture with the Choctawhatchee River.

The upper half of the stream, most of which forms the eastern boundary of Holmes County, passes through cypress swamps and sloughs, and is narrow, shallow, and slow flowing. The stream bed is sand and silt, and the water is brown, acid (pH > 7), and has a low mineral content. As the stream passes through Washington County, it flows over exposed limestone bedrock and is fed by numerous seeps and springs of different sizes. The first significant spring, the second magnitude Burnt Out Spring, is in the streambed about 1 mile (1.6 km) south of the County Road 276A bridge. Other second magnitude springs in the lower half of the stream include Becton Spring, Cypress Springs, and Jack Paul Spring, while third magnitude springs include Bronson Landing Spring and Galloway Spring. The stream water becomes clearer and more mineralized as the springs successively add their water to the stream's flow.

== Biota ==
Trees found along the stream include cypress, water tupelo, Florida anise, sweetbay, Carolina ash, pawpaw, and mayhaw. Large patches of pickerelweed and duck potato occur along the stream. Holmes Creek is described as a "good to outstanding" fishing stream, with channel catfish, flathead catfish, and bream being commonly caught.

=== Snails ===
The lower half of Holmes Creek has an unusually high diversity and abundance of freshwater snails. Twenty-two species of snails in eighteen genera and eight families have been found in the stream. The upper half of the stream has fewer species of snail present than the lower half. All of the snails found in the upper half of the stream are also found in the lower half and in other river basins.

Fifteen species of snails found in Holmes Creek have a wide distribution. (Note: The 15 species of snails that are found in other river basins include: Pomacea paludosa, Florida applesnail; Campeloma geniculum, ovate geniculum; Elimia curvicostata, curved-ribbed emilia; Somatogyrus walkerianus, Gulf Coast pebblesnail; Notobillia wetherbyi, alligator siltsnail; Pseudosuccinea columella, American ribbed fluke snail; Galba modicella, rock fossaria; Physella gyrina, tadpole physa; Physella hendersoni, bayou physa; Physella cubensis, Carib physa; Planorbella trivolvis, marsh rams-horn; Gyraulus parvus, ash gyro; Menetus dilatatus, trumpet rams-horn; Laevapex species; Ferrissia species) The remaining snail species found in Holmes Creek, while often locally abundant, have a restricted distribution. Elimia dickinsoni (stately elimia), is found only in the Choctawhatchee River (including Holmes Creek) basin and the neighboring Chipola River basin. Lioplax pilsbryi (Choctaw lioplax), Viviparus goodrichi (globose mysterysnail), and Rhapinema dacryon (teardrop snail), are restricted to the Holmes Creek and Chiploa River basins.

Three unnamed species of snails are endemic to the Holmes Creek basin. An unnamed species of Elimia is the most abundant large snail in Holmes Creek. It was originally identified as Elimia clenchi (slackwater elimia), which is endemic to the Choctawhatchee River basin, due to similarities of early growth stages of the two species. An unnamed species of Spilochlamys is found primarily in springs and spring runs along the lower half of Holmes Creek. It is closely related to Spilochlamys conica, which is found in southwestern Georgia, from the Flint River basin to the Withlacoochee River basin. An unnamed species of Lyogyrus is endemic to three springs along the middle part of Holmes Creek, and is restricted to cool and clear water. The species is most closely related to Lyogyrus latus, which is found in the Flint River and Ocmulgee River basins in Georgia. It is the most vulnerable to environmental disturbances of the snails in Holmes Creek.

== Paddling trail ==
Florida has designated the lower 34 miles (55 km) of Holmes Creek as the Holmes Creek Paddling Trail. The paddling trail starts at the Burnt Sock Landing, just south of the Washington County Road 276A bridge over the stream, and ends at the Cedar Tree Landing below the junction of Holmes Creek with the Choctawhatchee River.

== Sources ==
- Boning, Charles R. (2007). Florida's Rivers. Sarasota, Florida: Pineapple Press. ISBN 978-1-56164-400-1.
- Morris, Allen (1995). Florida Place Names. Joan Perry Morris, Photo Editor. Sarasota, Florida: Pineapple Press. ISBN 978-1-56164-084-3.
- Thompson, Fred G. (September 21, 2018). "Holmes Creek Biodiversity Inventory". Florida Museum of Natural History.
