= Jacob City, Florida =

- City
- City of Jacob City
- Motto: "Where Generations Take Pride in Calling this Home"
- Location in Jackson County and the state of Florida
- Coordinates: 30°52′50″N 85°24′47″W
- Country: United States
- State: Florida
- County: Jackson
- Settled (Spanish Florida): 1752
- Unincorporated (Jacob): c. mid-1800s
- Incorporated (City of Jacob City): 1983

Government
  - Type: Council-Manager
  - Mayor: Felix George
  - Council Members: Earnest Hall, Donna Pittman, Josephine Lewis–Henderson, and Jonitha Williams
  - City Manager: Verloria T. Wilson
  - City Clerk: Belinda "Dianne" Blount
  - City Attorneys: Harold M. Knowles and Roosevelt Randolph

Area
  - Total: 3.22 sq mi (8.35 km^{2})
  - Land: 3.05 sq mi (7.89 km^{2})
  - Water: 0.18 sq mi (0.46 km^{2})
- Elevation: 154 ft (47 m)

Population (2020)
  - Total: 217
  - Density: 71.2/sq mi (27.5/km^{2})
- Time zone: UTC-6 (Central (CST))
  - Summer (DST): UTC-5 (CDT)
- ZIP code: 32431
- Area code(s): 850, 448
- FIPS code: 12-35200
- GNIS feature ID: 2404786
- Website: www.jacobcityfl.org

Jacob City is a city in Jackson County, Florida, United States. The city is population is predominantly African American, and located on the Florida Panhandle in North Florida. The population was 217 at the 2020 census.

== History ==
Jacob City's history as a non-indigenous settlement began in 1752, under Spanish Florida. But it wasn't until the early 19th century, under American possession, when many formerly enslaved African Americans moved from Webbville to isolate themselves from harassment from the white people there, most of whose residents moved to Marianna in 1882. Webbville no longer exists, but was located around the current location of U.S. 231 and State Road 73. Marianna was known as the "rich man's town", and no Black people were welcome. The first known settlement of Jacob City was by a white man named Jacob Jones, who accepted anyone from the African diaspora to be housed on his property. That is where Jacob City got its name, as they would tell their friends, "Let's go to Jacob's." As Black people arrived to escape oppression, they moved farther down and made horse wagon trails into dirt roads, forming a small community.

By the mid-19th century, it became a permanent settlement known as "Jacob", and was Jackson County's first Black community. By the late 19th century, St. Mary Missionary Baptist Church was built on what is now Main Street. It is commemorated by a Jacob City historical marker. By the early 20th century, Jacob's dirt roads were improved and its population rose, but the poverty level was still high. The community once had a grocery store, a gas station, a sawmill, a corn mill that used to grind it into cornmeal and grits, and a few mills that turned sugarcane stalks into syrup. It also used to have its own school.

St. Mary Missionary Baptist Church still provides Sunday school for young residents. In 1953, St. Paul's school was established near Campbellton as an elementary and high school where Jacob children could get a better education. The Campbellton school lasted until 1972. Students now attend school in Cottondale or Graceville. In the late 20th century, Jacob modernized and joined the Florida League of Cities. In 1983, Jacob became the City of Jacob City and built a city hall.

== Geography ==
According to the United States Census Bureau, the city has a total area of 3.2 square miles (8.3 km^{2}), of which 3.1 square miles (8.0 km^{2}) is land and 0.1 square miles (0.26 km^{2}) (4.02%) is water.

=== Climate ===
The climate in this area is characterized by hot, humid summers and generally mild winters. According to the Köppen climate classification, the City of Jacob City has a humid subtropical climate zone (Cfa).

Climate data for Jacob City, Florida (Marianna Municipal Airport), 1991–2020 normals
Month	Jan	Feb	Mar	Apr	May	Jun	Jul	Aug	Sep	Oct	Nov	Dec	Year
Mean daily maximum °F (°C)	62.9 (17.2)	67.1 (19.5)	73.7 (23.2)	80.1 (26.7)	87.5 (30.8)	91.2 (32.9)	92.4 (33.6)	91.4 (33.0)	88.7 (31.5)	81.1 (27.3)	71.7 (22.1)	64.7 (18.2)	79.4 (26.3)
Daily mean °F (°C)	51.8 (11.0)	55.4 (13.0)	61.5 (16.4)	67.6 (19.8)	75.9 (24.4)	81.1 (27.3)	82.7 (28.2)	82.1 (27.8)	78.7 (25.9)	69.5 (20.8)	59.6 (15.3)	53.9 (12.2)	68.3 (20.2)
Mean daily minimum °F (°C)	40.7 (4.8)	43.8 (6.6)	49.2 (9.6)	55.1 (12.8)	64.2 (17.9)	71.1 (21.7)	73.0 (22.8)	72.8 (22.7)	68.6 (20.3)	58.0 (14.4)	47.4 (8.6)	43.0 (6.1)	57.2 (14.0)
Average precipitation inches (mm)	4.04 (103)	4.49 (114)	5.01 (127)	3.72 (94)	3.15 (80)	5.07 (129)	5.10 (130)	4.93 (125)	4.06 (103)	3.06 (78)	3.67 (93)	4.81 (122)	51.11 (1,298)
Average precipitation days (≥ 0.01 in)	10.0	9.4	9.0	7.4	6.4	12.4	13.9	13.6	9.4	8.1	8.9	10.7	119.2
Source: NOAA

== Demographics ==
Historical population
Census	Pop.	Note	%±
1990	261		—
2000	281		7.7%
2010	250		−11.0%
2020	217		−13.2%
U.S. Decennial Census

=== 2010 and 2020 census ===
Jacob City, Florida – Racial and ethnic composition Note: the US Census treats Hispanic/Latino as an ethnic category. This table excludes Latinos from the racial categories and assigns them to a separate category. Hispanics/Latinos may be of any race.
Race / Ethnicity (NH = Non-Hispanic)	Pop 2000	Pop 2010	Pop 2020	% 2000	% 2010	2020
White alone (NH)	14	17	13	4.98%	6.80%	5.99%
Black or African American alone (NH)	267	226	191	85.02%	90.40%	88.02%
Native American or Alaska Native alone (NH)	0	1	0	0.00%	0.40%	0.00%
Asian alone (NH)	0	0	0	0.00%	0.00%	0.00%
Pacific Islander or Native Hawaiian alone (NH)	0	0	0	0.00%	0.00%	0.00%
Other race alone (NH)	0	0	1	0.00%	0.00%	0.46%
Mixed race or Multiracial (NH)	0	6	9	0.00%	2.40%	4.15%
Hispanic or Latino (any race)	0	0	3	0.00%	0.00%	1.38%
Total	281	250	217	100.00%	100.00%	100.00%

As of the 2020 United States census, there were 250 people, 122 households, and 65 families residing in the city.

As of the 2010 United States census, there were 217 people, 130 households, and 91 families residing in the city.

=== 2000 census ===
As of the census of 2000, there were 281 people, 99 households, and 73 families residing in the city. The population density was 90.7 inhabitants per square mile (35.0/km^{2}). There were 116 housing units at an average density of 37.4 per square mile (14.4/km^{2}). The racial makeup of the city was 4.98% White and 95.02% African American.

In 2000, there were 99 households, out of which 31.3% had children under the age of 18 living with them, 41.4% were married couples living together, 28.3% had a female householder with no husband present, and 25.3% were non-families. 22.2% of all households were made up of individuals, and 11.1% had someone living alone who was 65 years of age or older. The average household size was 2.84 and the average family size was 3.36.

In 2000, in the city, the population was spread out, with 30.6% under the age of 18, 7.8% from 18 to 24, 27.0% from 25 to 44, 20.6% from 45 to 64, and 13.9% who were 65 years of age or older. The median age was 35 years. For every 100 females, there were 84.9 males. For every 100 females age 18 and over, there were 66.7 males.

In 2000, the median income for a household in the city was $24,583, and the median income for a family was $22,292. Males had a median income of $25,481 versus $21,875 for females. The per capita income for the city was $11,037. About 24.7% of families and 26.0% of the population were below the poverty line, including 42.9% of those under the age of eighteen and 7.7% of those 65 or over.

== Transportation ==
=== Highways ===
SR 273

CR 162 (Jacob Road)

US 231
