= U.S. Route 231 =

Highway in the United States

U.S. Route 231
- US 231 highlighted in red

Route information
- Auxiliary route of US 31
- Length: 912 mi (1,468 km)

Major junctions
- South end: 6th Street in Panama City, FL
- I-10 near Cottondale, FL; I-85 at Montgomery, AL; I-20 at Pell City, AL; I-59 at Ashville, AL; I-24 at Murfreesboro, TN; I-40 at Lebanon, TN; I-64 at Dale, IN; I-69 at Bloomfield, IN; I-70 at Cloverdale, IN; I-65 at various locations
- North end: US 41 at St. John, IN

Location
- Country: United States
- States: Florida, Alabama, Tennessee, Kentucky, Indiana

Highway system
- United States Numbered Highway System; List; Special; Divided

U.S. Route 231 (US 231) is a north–south U.S highway that is a parallel route of US 31. It runs for 912 miles (1,468 km) from St. John, Indiana, at US 41 to south of US 98 in downtown Panama City, Florida. One of its most notable landmarks is the William H. Natcher Bridge, a 0.853 miles (1.373 km) long cable-stayed bridge that connects Rockport, Indiana, to Owensboro, Kentucky, spanning the Ohio River.

== Route description ==
=== Florida ===
In Florida, US 231 is paired with unsigned State Road 75. The southern terminus is at Business US 98 (unsigned State Road 30) in downtown Panama City. The highway is carried by Harrison Avenue until its intersection with US 98. Continuing north, US 231 passes through Youngstown, Fountain, Alford, Cottondale, and Campbellton before entering Alabama. Major intersections include Business US 98, US 98, SR 77, SR 20, Interstate 10, US 90, SR 73, SR 273, and SR 2.

=== Alabama ===
In Alabama, US 231 is an alternate north-to-south route to Interstate 65, the main north-to-south thoroughfare in the state. U.S. Route 231 serves the east-central part of the state, with I-65 further west and US 431 further east. While both US 231 and US 431 connect the major cities of Dothan and Huntsville, US 231 has a shorter route through fewer cities and terrain changes, avoiding the mountainous cities of Albertville, Gadsden, Oxford, and Heflin. However, there are some mountainous cities along the route, such as Arab and Oneonta.

U.S. Route 231 is divided along two-lane roads, three-laned roads, and four-laned undivided and divided highways. The entire stretch south of Montgomery is four-laned, mostly divided with some undivided stretches; as it is a critical connector in the National Highway System, which is a very important web of highways critical to U.S. infrastructure. The stretch between Arab and the state line is an almost entirely four-lane divided highway.

Through Huntsville, Alabama, the route functions as Memorial Parkway - the main north-to-south freeway through downtown. The road is a freeway with frontage roads and Texas U-Turns, with some stretches with six lanes plus a frontage road exit lane in each direction. In the medical district of Huntsville, the freeway gains US 431 and loses the SR 53 designation. The road widens to ten lanes on the south side of Interstate 565, with the gained lanes used as access lanes for US 72 or I-565. On the north side of I-565, the road once again goes to six lanes and an exit lane, which is carried along its concurrency with US 72. About a mile north of the second junction with US 72, the route loses its frontage roads and reverts to a four-lane divided highway.

In general, the route is an important connector between Dothan, Montgomery, and Huntsville, three of the most populous cities in the state.

=== Tennessee ===
US 231 enters Tennessee from Alabama in a concurrency with US 431 until it reaches Fayetteville. North of there it runs through Shelbyville and later passes through the eastern part of the Nashville metro area, passing through the cities of Murfreesboro and Lebanon. By the time it reaches Bethpage, it joins U.S. Route 31E in another concurrency to the northeast before finally crossing the Kentucky State Line north of Westmoreland. The route is approximately 121 miles (195 km) from Tennessee's northern border to its southern border.

=== Kentucky ===
US 231 parallels Interstate 65 before reaching Bowling Green. From Bowling Green, US 231 closely parallels I-165 (formerly the William H. Natcher Parkway) until it reaches Owensboro. At Owensboro, US 231 joins US 60 (also known as the Wendell H. Ford Expressway) around the city's east side, which it then follows to just north of Maceo. US 60 then leaves toward the east while US 231 turns to the north, leaving the state via the William H. Natcher Bridge across the Ohio River.

A portion of the Owensboro-area route is relatively new; in 2014, a new section from Kentucky 54 to Kentucky 2830 opened, bypassing the former bypass route. Part of that former route has been renumbered as Kentucky 603. The remainder, south of 603, is partly a dead-end city street and an abandoned lane that will eventually become part of the David Adkisson Greenbelt trail.

=== Indiana ===
In Indiana, US 231 has the distinction of being the state's longest continuous highway. It covers approximately 297 miles (478 km) in the Hoosier State. US 231 passes through the towns of Dale, Huntingburg, Jasper, and Loogootee before reaching Bloomfield. In Bloomfield, US 231 passes Shawnee Field, a local airport. US 231 slices through central Indiana before reaching West Lafayette, where it runs just south and west of Purdue University. Next it mostly zigzags north and west, staying close to Interstate 65, before heading straight west from Crown Point, terminating at US 41.

Indiana's Major Moves program, which derives its funding from the lease of the Indiana Toll Road to private interests, has made it possible for the state to build many new miles of roadway throughout the state. As part of this program, US 231 is currently being updated to a new-terrain four-lane highway from the Indiana-Kentucky border through Spencer County to Interstate 64. This segment of US 231 has been named the Abraham Lincoln Memorial Parkway.

As of April 2011, the Lincoln Parkway is complete from the Kentucky line to the interchange at I-64 and the bypass of Dale at the northernmost end of the project. It is a fully operational partial cloverleaf and the previous two-lane 231 overpass has been demolished. It has been replaced by a new four-lane overpass.

The section from SR 162 to Indiana State Highway 70 near Chrisney was the last to be opened, after a ribbon-cutting ceremony on March 15, 2011, much sooner than the original July 2011 projected date.

In addition to the Spencer County project, a four-lane bypass of the Dubois County cities of Huntingburg and Jasper is also in the planning stages, but funding has not been secured. A firm timetable for construction has yet to materialize.

== History ==
A US 231 shield used in Florida prior to 1993

U.S. Route 152 was commissioned in 1934, connecting Indianapolis with Hammond. It followed US 52 from Indianapolis to northwest of Lafayette, where it turned north to end at US 20 in Hammond. In 1938, the route was decommissioned, and became a southern extension of State Road 53 from northwest of Lafayette to Crown Point, a new State Road 152 from Highland to Hammond, and was simply dropped in favor of the overlapping US 52, State Road 8, and US 41 elsewhere. These parts of SR 53 and SR 8 became US 231 in 1952, when US 231 was extended north from Montgomery to US 41 south of St. John.

== Major intersections ==
Florida
6th Street and Harrison Avenue in Panama City
US 98 in Panama City
I-10 south of Cottondale
US 90 in Cottondale
Alabama
US 431 in Dothan
US 84 in Dothan. The highways travel concurrently through Dothan.
US 29 in Troy
US 82 south-southeast of Pike Road. The highways travel concurrently to Montgomery.
US 80 in Montgomery. The highways travel concurrently through Montgomery.
I-85 in Montgomery
US 280 in Sylacauga. The highways travel concurrently to Harpersville.
US 78 in Pell City
I-20 in Pell City
US 411 in Ashville. The highways travel concurrently through Ashville.
I-59 in Ashville
US 11 in Ashville
US 278 south-southwest of Summit
US 431 in Huntsville. The highways travel concurrently to Fayetteville, Tennessee.
I-565 / US 72 Alt. in Huntsville.
US 72 in Huntsville. The highways travel concurrently through Huntsville.
Tennessee
US 64 / US 431 in Fayetteville. US 64/US 231 travels concurrently through Fayetteville.
I-24 in Murfreesboro
US 41 / US 70S in Murfreesboro. The highways travel concurrently through Murfreesboro.
I-40 in Lebanon
US 70 in Lebanon
US 31E west-southwest of Bransford. The highways travel concurrently to Scottsville, Kentucky.
Kentucky
I-65 in Bowling Green
US 31W in Bowling Green
US 68 in Bowling Green. The highways travel concurrently through Bowling Green.
US 62 in Beaver Dam. The highways travel concurrently through Beaver Dam.
US 60 in Owensboro. The highways travel concurrently to Maceo.
Indiana
I-64 in Dale
US 50 / US 150 in Loogootee. The highways travel concurrently through Loogootee.
I-69 west-northwest of Scotland
I-70 in Cloverdale
US 40 north-northwest of Cloverdale
US 36 east of Morton
US 136 in Crawfordsville
I-74 in Crawfordsville
US 52 northwest of West Lafayette. The highways travel concurrently to Montmorenci.
I-65 south of Wolcott
US 24 in Wolcott. The highways travel concurrently to Remington.
I-65 east of Remington
I-65 north of Remington
I-65 in Crown Point
US 41 in St. John

== See also ==
- Special routes of U.S. Route 231

Browse numbered routes
← SR 229	AL	→ SR 233
