= Florida State Road 77 =

State highway in Florida, United States

State Road 77
- SR 77 highlighted in red

Route information
- Maintained by FDOT
- Length: 62.968 mi (101.337 km)

Major junctions
- South end: US 98 Bus. in Panama City
- SR 368 in Panama City; US 231 in Panama City; US 98 in Panama City; CR 28 in Panama City; I-10 in Chipley
- North end: SR 109 towards Dothan, AL

Location
- Country: United States
- State: Florida
- Counties: Bay, Washington, Jackson

Highway system
- Florida State Highway System; Interstate; US; State; Former; Pre‑1945; Toll; Scenic
← SR 76	→ SR 78

State Road 77 (SR 77) is a major north–south artery in Florida's Panhandle, connecting Panama City to the south with Alabama State Route 109 and Dothan, Alabama to the north.

State Road 77 is mostly a four-lane non-limited-access highway from its south terminus intersection with U.S. Route 98 Business and State Road 30 north to its intersection with State Road 20. Current plans are under way to widen the route to four lanes north to the Florida–Alabama border in the near future.

== Route description ==
=== Panama City and Bay County ===
State Road 77 begins in Panama City at US Business Route 98 (Sixth Street) as a continuation of North Cove Boulevard, which itself spans as far south as Bunkers Cove. The route shares the additional name of Martin Luther King Jr. Boulevard. The first site along the road is an ambulance depot next to the Bay Medical Center Sacred Heart Health System. The road is a major four-lane divided boulevard throughout the city, and one of the important cross-streets is County Road 28 (Eleventh Street). However, this street is only important on a city level. The first major intersection along the route is US 98 (15th Street). Two and a half blocks farther, the route faces an equally important intersection, specifically a grade crossing with the Bay Line Railroad that runs parallel to US 231. North of US 231, the east side of the road is completely dominated by the Panama City Mall until the intersection with State Road 368 (23rd Street). Commercial development is diminished somewhat north of there, but not eliminated. North of County Road 2312 (East Baldwin Road), the route enters Lynn Haven and both street names in Panama City are replaced by Lynn Haven Parkway. The progression of numbered cross streets are also reversed. As expected, the surroundings consist of commercial strip development, occasionally interrupted by vacant lots and small wooded areas. At some point, it crosses an exempt spur of the Bay Line Railroad, and the divider ends at 18th Street, where Lynn Haven Parkway becomes Ohio Avenue. Four blocks north of there, it intersects the eastern terminus of State Road 390 and western terminus of County Roads 390 (14th Street). Two blocks after that, it serves as the northwestern terminus of County Road 389 (12th Street), a county extension of State Road 389 down in Panama City.

After the intersection of Fifth Street, SR 77 takes a slight northeast curve. The last intersection in Lynn Haven is with East Third Street on the east side, which leads to a local boat ramp at the foot of the former and current North Bay Bridge, the latter of which is a divided bridge that the route uses to cross over a tributary of St. Andrews Bay to enter Southport. When the road returns to land it curves northeast around Fannin Bayou, maintaining its status as a four-lane divided highway. Only after the intersection of McCormick Road does it curve from the northeast to the northwest where it serves as the northwestern terminus of County Road 2321 (former State and County Road 77A; see below). The road then intersects a street named Ball Park Road and then crosses a pair of bridges over some wetlands leading to Fannin Bayou before encountering the intersection of County Road 2302, Leaving Southport, the speed limit jumps from 45 mph (72 km/h) to 55 mph (89 km/h) and then 65 mph (105 km/h) as it runs through more rural surroundings such as farmlands and forests and encounters the intersection with County Road 2300. Roughly in the vicinity of a power line right of way, the route enters Vicksburg, where the road has an intersection with County Road 388 which leads to Northwest Florida Beaches International Airport, which is across from a local street named Edwards Road. It then turns straight along a one-mile SR 77/CR 388 concurrency that exists until CR 388 branches off to the northeast on its way to Youngstown and US 231. SR 77 resumes its northwestern trajectory once again. Forestland continues along the route with sparse residencies and unfinished developments including along the southwest shores of Merial Lake, where the road encounters a Bay County Fire Station, and some sand mines across from the lake, just before briefly turning straight north. As it enters Oak Park, it makes a reverse curve to the right around Tank Pond before intersecting State Road 20. North of there, the four-divided highway ends, and a continuation of the southbound right-of-way is used as a park and ride across from a power substation before State Road 77 finally crosses the Bay-Washington County Line.

=== Washington County ===
The first community that State Road 77 enters in Washington County is the unincorporated community of Crystal Lake. After intersecting the street for which the community is named, the route makes a sharp turn to the northeast, which it will follow throughout most of the county. The community contains such sites as Crystal Village Airport. Later it enters Panama Heights where it encounters the southeastern terminus of County Road 279, and grounds of the Northwest Florida Reception Center (formerly the Washington Correctional Institution). The road maintains the same rural characteristics north of there, but soon encounters another series of unfinished developments. The closest resemblance to a populated area is the Sunny Hills Golf and Country Club where the road becomes wide enough for left turn lanes at the entrances to the development. North of there road is no longer straight, winding back and forth through rural southern Washington County. Within a small forest around a curve, the route officially enters the Town of Wausau and gains the street name Washington Street. Low numbered local streets intersect the route which itself runs between the post office and a historical marker honoring the town's "possum festivals" before it finally approaches a blinker-light intersection with County Road 278 (Pioneer Road). Remaining cross streets in the town have names, and the route leaves the town, curving its way out. The street name doesn't so much disappear as it diminishes as road resumes its previous surroundings of sporadic forestland and farmland coupled with intersections with random dirt road, but the forests are more lush and the road crosses more low bridges over small creeks with names like "Hard Labor Creek" and "Flat Creek", which can be found just south of the intersection of County Road 276 (Clayton Road), South of Peel Road the route briefly curves to the northwest and then heads back to the northeast.

In Crow, there are signs directing motorists to Falling Waters State Park just before those for the route leading to it, which is County Road 77A (See below). Shortly after this, the road becomes a four-lane divided highway again just south of the Blue Lake Park and Community Center, but that divided section is intended for commercial development ahead of the interchange with Interstate 10 at Exit 120. From that point the route just begins to enter the City of Chipley and is named Main Street. The divided section ends in front of a Wal-Mart and other shopping centers just south of Nearing Hills Drive, and the road takes another curve to the northeast. Commercial development resumes again along the road as it approaches County Road 280 (Brickyard Road), and the Northwest Florida Community Hospital can be found on the northwest corner of that intersection. SR 77 turns straight north again at the northern terminus of County Road 77A. More than a block later it has an intersection with County Road 273 (South Boulevard). North of that intersection, reassurance signs for State Road 273 accompany those of SR 77, because the county road at the previous intersection was once an extension of that route.

The road enters downtown Chipley just before the intersection of US 90 (Jackson Avenue). Just over a block to the north it crosses an at-grade crossing with CSX P&A Subdivision a block west of the Chipley Amtrak station, as well as the former Louisville and Nashville Railroad depot that it replaced. Though the road leaves downtown, it remains within the city limits as it enters a mostly residential area of the city which includes a culvert over a small creek between Watts and Coggin Avenues and the eastern terminus of County Road 166 (Old Bonifay Road). The next intersection is with Campbellton Avenue and then SR 273 makes a right turn onto Glenwood Avenue, leading to the very community for which the previous local street is named. At Plum Avenue the route begins to make another curve to the northeast while Main Street continues straight as a rural road. SR 77 leaves the city limits just before the intersection with Warren Avenue, and reunites with the remnants of Main Street as Buttermilk Bend Circle, which ends on the northwest corner of the intersection of SR 77, Martin Luther King Jr., Street and Leany Road. After this five pointed intersection, SR 77 curves back to the north again around Notch Pond. From there it encounters some relatively significant dirt roads, the first being Bahoma Road. which leads to the ghost town of the same name, and the second being Williams Road, which is a poorly paved street on the west side and a dirt road on the east side. The northeast corner of Williams Road also includes a dirt road named Stanton Drive which runs to the northeast, and makes a sharp turn back to SR 77 just south of the Washington-Jackson County Line.

=== Northwestern Jackson County ===
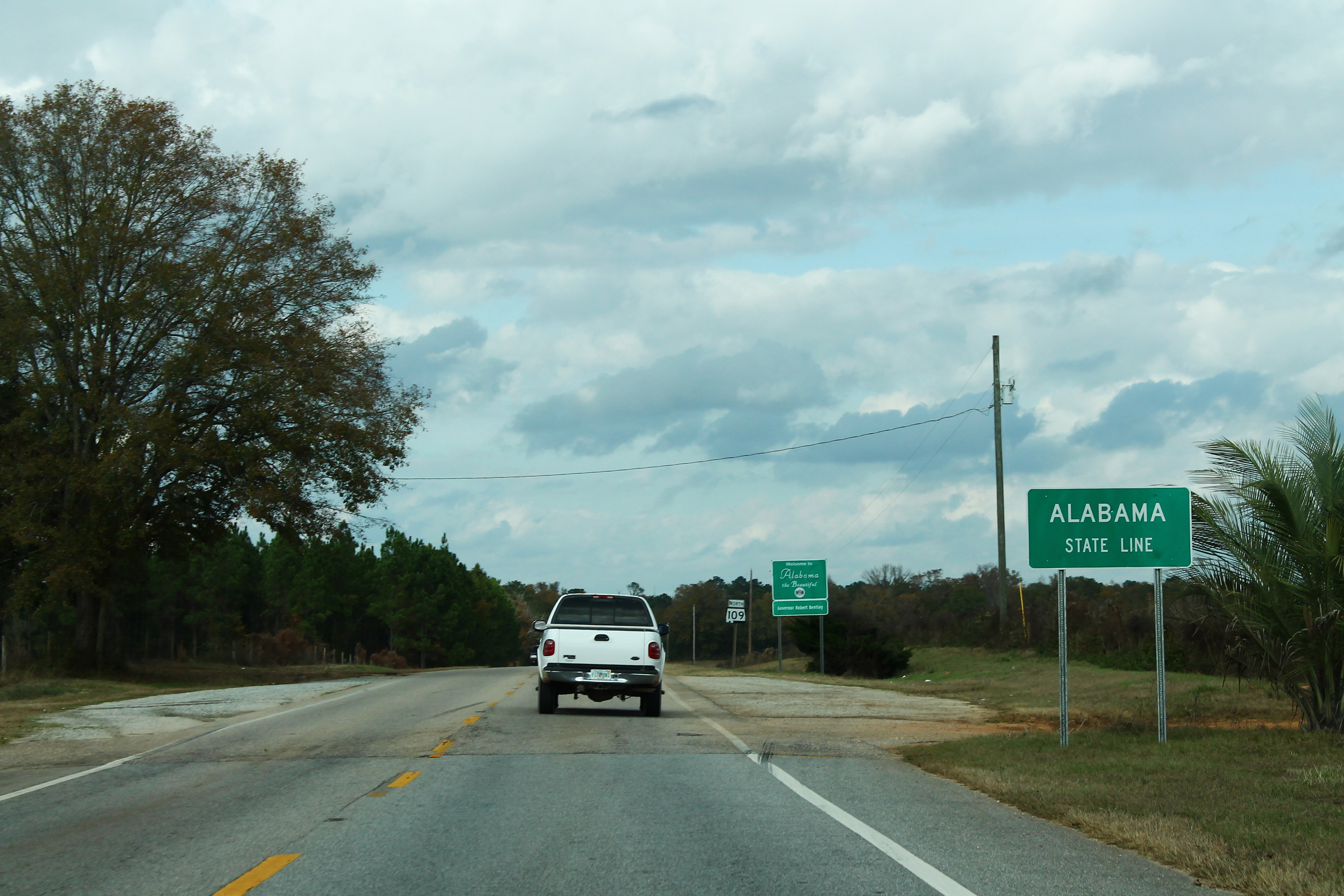
A sign depicting the Alabama State Line, where FL 77 becomes AL 109.

Within northwestern Jackson County, the rural surroundings are carried over from the area north of Chipley. After a bridge over Minnow Creek, State Road 77 has its first moderate intersection with County Road 164 (Lovewood Road), a long county road spanning towards Chattahoochee State Park across the Alabama state line, that is interrupted by unpaved sections, and concurrencies in the Marianna area with SR 73, US 90, and SR 71. The road takes more of a northeast curve from there, although it curves slightly to the left before the intersection with Vicki Road, but not far enough to run straight north. The trajectory and rural surroundings continue as the road approaches the intersection with County Road 162, which despite being named "Tri-County Road" only exists in Holmes and Jackson Counties. A fire tower exists on the northeast corner of this intersection. The road maintains the same trajectory for the next 3.3 miles with few local dirt road intersections before encountering the northeastern terminus of County Road 277 (Piano Road), a rural bi-county extension of State Road 277. The road then takes more of a northeasterly curve than before as it passes by a church at the intersection of Damascus Church Road and the accompanying cemetery behind it. Just north of the intersection with a dirt road named Heisler Road, the route curves from the northeast to the northwest once again.

At the intersection of Prim Avenue, SR 77 enters Graceville and becomes Brown Street. The road passes by a civic center, a small industrial park, a children's playground, and an abandoned gas station. North of a small bridge over Little Creek, SR 77 branches off to the left at a blinker light onto Cotton Street. A lumber distributor can be found between Fourth and Fifth Street just south of an abandoned grade crossing for the former Graceville Branch of the Atlanta and St. Andrews Bay Railway. At Eighth Street a concurrency with State Road 2 begins, and runs for five blocks until it turns west at White Street. From there, the road takes a sharp curve to the northeast, and one block later resume the name Brown Street. Roughly a block after this it serves as the northwestern terminus of County Road 193 (Sanders Avenue). The road passes several more local streets within town until it reaches some former plots of farmland that are currently occupied by a private residence, a long driveway to a bingo hall, Graceville High School and then the intersection of Spears Road and College Drive, the latter of which leads to Campbellton-Graceville Hospital and the Baptist College of Florida. Just after leaving the city limits, the northeast trajectory begins to wane before the intersection with Johns Road, a one lane dirt road leading to Kirkland Airport The road moves more towards the north after the intersection with another dirt road named Primrose Lane, but still runs northeast as State Road 77 ends at the Florida-Alabama state line and becomes Alabama State Route 109 in Houston County.

== Major intersections ==
County	Location	mi	km	Destinations	Notes
Bay	Panama City	0.000	0.000	US 98 Bus. (SR 30)	
Bay	Panama City	0.713	1.147	CR 28 (11th Street)	
Bay	Panama City	1.215	1.955	US 98 (15th Street / SR 30A)	
Bay	Panama City	1.757	2.828	US 231 (SR 75) – Youngstown	
Bay	Panama City	2.212	3.560	SR 368 (23rd Street) – Gulf Coast Community College	
Bay	Panama City–Lynn Haven line	3.089	4.971	CR 2312 (Baldwin Road)	
Bay	Lynn Haven	5.523	8.888	SR 390 (14th Street) – Beaches	
Bay	Lynn Haven	5.735	9.230	CR 389 south (12th Street)	
Bay		6.626– 7.307	10.664– 11.759	Bailey Bridge over North Bay	
Bay	Southport	9.099	14.643	CR 2321 east	
Bay	Southport	9.457	15.220	CR 2302 west	
Bay	Southport	10.444	16.808	CR 2300 west	
Bay	Vicksburg	11.954	19.238	SR 388 west – West Bay, Northwest Florida Beaches International Airport	south end of CR 388 overlap
Bay		12.919	20.791	CR 388 east – Camp Herbert Watts	north end of CR 388 overlap
Bay		19.904	32.032	SR 20 – Clarksville, Ebro, Dog Track	
Washington	Greenhead	26.107	42.015	CR 279 north (Moss Hill Road) – Northwest Florida Reception Center	
Washington	Wausau	35.889	57.758	CR 278 (Pioneer Road)	
Washington		40.740	65.565	CR 276 (Clayton Road)	
Washington		43.357	69.776	CR 77A north (State Park Road)	
Washington	Chipley	44.236	71.191	I-10 (SR 8) – Pensacola, Tallahassee	Exit 120 (I-10)
Washington	Chipley	45.549	73.304	CR 280 (Brickyard Road)	
Washington	Chipley	46.014	74.052	CR 77A south (Falling Waters Road)	no right turn northbound
Washington	Chipley	46.145	74.263	CR 273 (South Boulevard)	
Washington	Chipley	46.682	75.127	US 90 (Jackson Avenue / SR 10) – Bonifay, Cottondale, Chipley Historic District	
Washington	Chipley	47.154	75.887	CR 166 west (Old Bonifay Road)	
Washington	Chipley	47.407	76.294	SR 273 north (Glenwood Avenue) – Campbellton	
Jackson		50.760	81.690	CR 164 (Lovewood Road)	
Jackson		53.812	86.602	CR 162 (Tri County Road)	
Jackson		57.084	91.868	CR 277 south (Piano Road)	
Jackson	Graceville	59.146	95.186	SR 2 east (8th Avenue) – Baptist College of Florida	
Jackson	Graceville	59.510	95.772	SR 2 west (White Avenue) – Miller Crossroads	
Jackson	Graceville	59.683	96.050	CR 193 south (Sanders Avenue)	
Jackson	Graceville	59.820	96.271	CR 169 south (Cliff Street)	
Jackson		62.968	101.337	SR 109 north – Dothan	Alabama State Line
1.000 mi = 1.609 km; 1.000 km = 0.621 mi: Concurrency terminus

== Related routes ==
=== County Road 77A ===
County Road 77A
- Location: Crow-Chipley

County Road 77A is a county-suffixed alternate route of SR 77. It begins as an east–west road in Crow named State Park Road, turns north onto a north–south road named Falling Waters Road leading back to SR 77 in Chipley. The road serves as a connecting route to Falling Waters State Park, which can be entered at the continuation of State Park Road east of Falling Waters Road. South of that intersection, the road is a local street leading to the farmlands of eastern Washington County.

=== County Road 2321 ===
County Road 2321
- Location: Cedar Grove-Southport

County Road 2321, formerly State Road 77A, was a suffixed alternate of State Road 77 north of Panama City. The route began in Cedar Grove at US 231, and runs straight north and south until after the intersection of CR 2293 (Titus Road), where it turns to the northwest. From there, it runs across a dam between North Bay and Deer Point Lake. As it returns to land it curves to the northeast around Hodges Bayou and then makes a sharp left at the intersection of Eastern CR 2302 (Resota Beach Road), then running west along the north shore of North bay until terminating at SR 77.
