= Florida State Road 277 =

State highway in Florida, United States

State Road 277
- SR 277 in red, segments of CR 277 in blue

Route information
- Maintained by FDOT
- Length: 14.213 mi (22.874 km)

Major junctions
- South end: SR 79 in Vernon
- North end: US 90 near Chipley

Location
- Country: United States
- State: Florida
- Counties: Washington

Highway system
- Florida State Highway System; Interstate; US; State; Former; Pre‑1945; Toll; Scenic
← SR 276	→ SR 281

State Road 277 (SR 277) is a north-south state and county highway in the panhandle in the U.S. state of Florida that extends from State Road 79 (SR 79) in Vernon to U.S. Route 90 (US 90) in Hulaw west of Chipley. SR 277 runs entirely through Washington County, although one of the two county extensions runs through both Washington and Jackson Counties, Most, if not all of the road is a two-lane undivided highway. Between its termini, SR 277 intersects with no state roads other than former ones, and shares a concurrency with at least one of those county roads. A sizeable portion of the road runs in close proximity to the east side of Holmes Creek.

== Route description ==
State Road 277 begins at State Road 79 in Vernon, both of which were undergoing a major reconstruction project in the early 2010s that led to the relocation of the south end of SR 277 onto Court Avenue near the vicinity of Church Street. A connecting road between Court Avenue and Roche Avenue in the vicinity of Church Street brought the new section into the old one. Before SR 277 even leaves "downtown" Vernon, it serves as the western terminus of County Road 278 (Pioneer Road), on the corner of the Vernon Elementary School, and which is across from Calvary Hill Pentecostal Church. County Road 278 is a county road that leads towards Wausau, and the unfinished development known as Gilberts Mill. As with much of the Florida panhandle, the surroundings along SR 277 are primarily rural and agricultural, but is still part of the city, as evidenced by where it passes by Vernon Fire Department. On the northeastern edge of the city limits are a series of dairy farms and a dirt road named Bruner Dairy Road which runs east. After crossing a power line right-of-way, the road intersects a local paved street running northwest named Culpepper Lane, a street which leads to the Big Pine Lake Boat Launch park on Holmes Creek. Later it encounters another dirt road along the east side running toward the southwest named Owens Community Road Following a curve towards the north, the road encounters a much smaller small private dirt road and dead end street named Dottie West Road, one of two such roads named for the former country musician. The surrounding farmland ends temporarily just south of a culvert over a creek, replaced by forestland. One unnamed dirt road and dead-end street runs west of the road within this patch of forest, but farms return once again. In this area, the road serves as the northern terminus of County Road 278A (Bonnett Pond Road), and then a bridge over Hard Labor Creek. After passing by a pair of intersections of short local dirt roads close with one another, including the second Dottie West Road, the route encounters a more important intersection with the west end of CR 276A(Clayton Road), which also includes an unmarked western extension of Clayton Road that becomes a dirt road before terminating at SR 79.

Continuing north of Clayton Road, a few farm tracts remain and then forestland returns as it skirts the Holmes Creek Tract, curving more north once again, where it intersects Coon Hollow Road and later Hartzog Road, two otherwise unimportant dirt road that both lead to a local airport called Hartzog Field. After this however, the road does encounter a much more important road on the opposite side, specifically the southwest end of the County Road 280 concurrency at Douglas Ferry Road. SR 277/CR 280 curves more towards the east near the Shiloh Baptist Church. and generally remains at this trajectory as it approaches the northwest end of CR 276, a bi-county road that leads to State Road 276 in Marianna, then makes a more northerly curve towards the embankment for a bridge over Interstate 10 with no access between either of the two roads. From there, it spends its remaining mileage in a community named Hulaw, which is west of Chipley. The route encounters five different local streets, some dirt and others paved, but then gains turn lanes as it encounters the northeast end of CR 280 concurrency at Brickyard Road, which runs through southern Chipley and ends at an unmarked local road (Sewell Farms Road) east of the city. After passing the Limestone Cemetery, the road then curves straight north and the next moderate intersection is the northwest end of CR 273(South Boulevard), a de facto extension of State Road 273. State Road 277 terminates at U.S 90 in Hulaw, across from a former gas station along the north side of that road. However, the next intersection to the east of this terminus is one of two county extensions of CR 277 (See below).

== Major intersections ==
The entire route is in Washington County.

Location	mi	km	Destinations	Notes
Vernon	0.000	0.000	SR 79 (Main Street) – Ebro, Bonifay	
Vernon	0.427	0.687	CR 278 east (Pioneer Road)	
	6.130	9.865	Bonnett Pond Road (CR 278A south)	
Brock Crossroad	6.928	11.150	CR 276A (Clayton Road)	
	10.048	16.171	CR 280 west (Douglas Ferry Road)	
	11.572	18.623	CR 276 east (Piney Grove Road)	
	13.420	21.597	CR 280 east (Brickyard Road)	
	13.963	22.471	CR 273 south (South Boulevard)	
	14.213	22.874	US 90 (SR 10) – Bonifay, Chipley	
1.000 mi = 1.609 km; 1.000 km = 0.621 mi

== Related routes ==
State Road 277 has two county extensions, neither of which are suffixed or special routes. Both routes exist within Washington County, but one of them extends north into Jackson County.

=== Southern County Road 277 ===
County Road 277
- Location: Washington County

County Road 277 is a county extension of SR 277 known as Fanning Branch Road. The route begins at Holmes Valley Road which is an unmarked dirt road on both sides of the southern terminus. The next intersection at the corner of a local church is Reno Road, which is paved and also leads to Holmes Valley Road which itself is paved east of that point. Both official and homemade signs warn motorists, especially truckers of dangerous curves ahead, but those curves are short lived. The rest of the road becomes straight north and south once again. The route officially ends at State Road 79 but continues in a hidden concurrency along SR 79 to its upgraded route in Vernon.

=== Northern County Road 277 ===
County Road 277
- Location: Washington and Jackson Counties

The second County Road 277 is a county suffixed alternate of SR 277 that extends into northwestern Jackson County. The route begins at US 90 east of the eastern terminus of SR 277 as Griffin Road west of the Chipley border. This intersection is shared with a local street named Kirkland Road, and has a local building supply warehouse on the northwest corner. Along the way, the road crosses a used irrigation creek and a Frito-Lay distribution warehouse then has an at-grade crossing with CSX P&A Subdivision. Griffin Road ends at Old Bonifay Road(CR 166), but CR 277 turns west and joins the route in a short concurrency. CRs 166/277 make a reverse curve to the north and back to the west again over a bridge over Alligator Creek, a tributary of Holmes Creek, then CR 277 turns north again at Cope Road, while CR 166 continues west towards the Washington-Holmes County Line where it becomes an unmarked road leading to the city that bears its name.

After the intersections of Enfinger Road and Wolf Bay Road, CR 277 curves to the northwest and then the name changes from Cope Road to Earlston Road. The route crosses the Washington-Jackson County Line at Searcy Road. The first intersection within the county just so happens to be the western terminus of County Road 164(Lovewood Road), across from a dairy farm. The road then makes a left curve into some woods and intersects a dirt road to the east named Gum Creek Road just before crossing the bridge of the creek that bears that name. After the bridge. it begins to curve more toward the north again, although it still maintains a northwest trajectory even as Earlston Road is on the verge of ending, where CR 277 is about to turn to the right in a concurrency with County Road 162, which despite being named "Tri-County Road" only runs through Holmes and Jackson Counties. CRs 162/277 runs straight north at first, but then curves more toward the northeast at the intersections of Christy Lane and Hickshill Road. Just after the road turns straight east, CR 277 turns north onto Piano Road, while CR 162 continues towards Jacob City and Greenwood. As with State Road 277, CR 277 remains along the east side of Holmes Creek, winding through farmlands and small forests of northwestern Jackson County. For some unexplained reason, many maps (including those published by FDOT) incorrectly show CR 277 along Piano Road having connecting spur routes onto side roads, many of which cross bridges over Holmes Creek and entering Holmes County, like Reddick Mill Road and Spruce Road while others are little more than dead end dirt roads such as Triangle Drive. In reality no such spurs exist because the route stays strictly along Piano Road. County Road 277 terminates at State Road 77 just south of Graceville.
