= Florida State Road 276 =

State highway in Florida, United States

State Road 276
- SR 276 in red, CR 276 in blue, CR 276A in purple, CR 1656 in pink

Route information
- Maintained by FDOT
- Length: 3.395 mi (5.464 km)

Major junctions
- West end: CR 167 in Marianna
- I-10 in Marianna
- East end: US 90 / SR 73 in Marianna

Location
- Country: United States
- State: Florida
- Counties: Jackson

Highway system
- Florida State Highway System; Interstate; US; State; Former; Pre‑1945; Toll; Scenic
← I-275	→ SR 277

State Road 276 (SR 276) is a state road in the panhandle of Florida. It runs west to east from former State Road 167 (now CR 167) into U.S. Route 90 (US 90) in and around Marianna entirely within Jackson County, although a bi-county extension exists between State Road 277 (SR 277) southwest of Chipley in Washington County that runs south then east into CR 167 which is signed as County Road 276 (CR 276). Most of the road is a two-lane undivided highway, with exceptions in the vicinity of Interstate 10, and if you count the bi-county portion, the overlapped segment with U.S. 231 where it changes from a four-lane undivided highway to a four-lane divided highway between Alford and Steele City.

== Route description ==
The county segment that was once part of State Road 276 begins in Washington County at State Road 277 as Piney Grove Road. This section of the road runs south and north, while the rest of the road runs east and west. The first intersection after its northern and western terminus is a local street name Duncan Community Road. Much of the atmosphere is rural and agricultural with both active and abandoned farmland, occasionally obstructed or interrupted by small forests. Piney Grove Road ends at Clayton Road, which is the eastern terminus of County Road 276A (see below), and CR 276 turns at its intended direction for the first time, with the same rural atmosphere. The first intersection it faces here is Duncan Community Road, and then a far more important one with State Road 77. Just east of there, the road makes a sharp left curve to the north at Ostrich Lane which continues to the east, then turns east again between Falling Waters Road and Old Church Road. The route runs past four more intersections before Clayton Road ends at CR 273(Orange Hill Road), where an abandoned gas station can be found on the northwest corner, but CR 276 turns south onto a brief concurrency with CR 273, where it passes by a firehouse and then returns to the east onto Alford Highway, which for some reason isn't marked.

The farmland that surrounds much of CR 276 comes to a halt at Wes Nelson Road, and is replaced by forestland with two residencies, though it shows up again east of the shared intersection of Porter Road and Rooks Circle. At a dirt road named Vickery Road, Alford Highway becomes Cypress Creek Road, which later curves southeast away from a dirt road with a similar name. Cypress Creek Road ends at Gilberts Mill Road and CR 276 briefly takes over that street name for the equivalent of one block until it crosses the Washington-Jackson County Line at Macedonia Road, and the name changes to Park Avenue. The surroundings from this point on change entirely to forestland until it enters the Town of Alford. Besides sparse residences interrupted by occasional farmland, one notable site within the town is a local Bed & Breakfast that looks like a former school building. Local cross streets formed in a grid join the road later on even as it crosses an at-grade railroad crossing with a railroad line once owned by the Atlanta and Saint Andrews Bay Railway. One block later the road encounters US 231, and turns north in a concurrency while Park Avenue turns into Park Road, which dead ends at a local cemetery, but not before providing a fork in the road that returns motorists back to the route.

US 231/CR 276 becomes a divided highway at Little Valley Road. After curving away from the tracks across from Rowell Road, US 231 enters the community of Steele City, and CR 276 turns east onto Kynesville Road between a gas station and a local Baptist Church and accompanying cemetery, while US 231 heads north towards Cottondale, Campbellton, and through Alabama far north into northwestern Indiana. The segment along Kynesville Road remains rural, although forest land prevails more than farmland compared to Washington County. Along the way, it encounters an intersection with Holley Timber Road, a dirt road north of CR 276, and south of the route, a paved rural route that gives motorists a chance to return to Park Road in Alford. In Kynesville, the intersection of Standland Road seems to have an unfinished connection to Bethlehem Road and Mill Road, the former of these being the next intersection which contains a small church and cemetery on the southeast corner. Later the route passes by the fledgling Sunny Oaks RV Park

The state maintained portion doesn't officially begin until west of the west end of an overlap with County Road 167(Fairview Road). The road then takes a northeast curve and two more intersections exist before SR 276/CR 167 becomes a divided highway and runs under a diamond interchange with Interstate 10 at Exit 136. Right after this the road officially enters the City of Marianna where the divided segment ends and it passes by a Florida Division of Forestry garage, and a fire station. CR 167 moves east onto South Street, which is across the street from the recently infamous Dozier School for Boys, while SR 273 becomes Pennsylvania Avenue as it briefly turns straight north until it passes by a local public utilities office and turns back to the northeast. Several blocks after this it encounters a blinker light intersection with Cottondale Road (Unmarked County Road 10A). Surroundings north of there become slightly more industrial and business oriented and this continues as it meets a grade crossing with the CSX P&A Subdivision, where it turns straight north once more. The route terminates at US 90/SR 73/CR 164, however it also continues north as a local street named Bump Nose Road.

== Major intersections ==
County	Location	mi	km	Destinations	Notes
Washington		0.000	0.000	SR 277	
Washington		3.3	5.3	CR 276A west (Clayton Road)	
Washington		5.1	8.2	SR 77 – Wausau, Chipley	
Washington	Orange Hill	9.144	14.716	CR 273 north (Orange Hill Road)	West end of CR 273 overlap
Washington	Orange Hill	9.396	15.121	CR 273 south (Orange Hill Road)	East end of CR 273 overlap
Jackson	Alford	15.946	25.663	US 231 south (Georgia Street / SR 75)	West end of US 231 / SR 75 overlap
Jackson	Steele City	17.878	28.772	US 231 north (SR 75) to I-10 – Cottondale	East end of US 231 / SR 75 overlap
Jackson	Marianna	24.433	39.321	CR 167 south (Fairview Road) – Panama City, Fountain	West end of state maintenance, and CR 176 overlap
Jackson	Marianna	25.08	40.36	I-10 (SR 8) – Pensacola, Tallahassee	I-10 exit 136
Jackson	Marianna	26.416	42.512	CR 167 north (South Street)	East end of CR 176 overlap
Jackson	Marianna	27.336	43.993	CR 10A (Old Cottondale Road)	
Jackson	Marianna	27.828	44.785	US 90 / SR 73 (Lafayette Street / SR 10) – Florida Caverns State Park	
1.000 mi = 1.609 km; 1.000 km = 0.621 mi: Concurrency terminus; Route transition

== History ==
The entire segment was originally a state highway. Until the 1970s, State Road 276 ran east along South Street in Marianna, then turned north onto McPherson Street which crossed the CSX P&A Subdivision, and then terminated at Caledonia Street. From there it then ran north along Caledonia where it ended at US 90 between a former bank building and a monument commemorating the Battle of Marianna.

== Related routes ==
State Road 276 has only one suffixed alternate route, and only of the Washington County segment. A second former SR 276A in Jackson County is now CR 1656.

=== County Road 276A ===
County Road 276A
- Location: Washington County

County Road 276A is a suffixed alternate of CR 276, specifically Clayton Road, which is a local dirt road that begins west of this route at State Road 79. CR 276A begins at SR 277 in Brock Crossroads briefly running southeast, then curves to the northeast for most of its length. After the intersection with a north–south dirt road named Hard Labor Road, it curves further north only to turn straight east at the intersection of an east–west dirt road named Cheverie Circle. Past a dirt road named Larkin Drive, County Road 276A ends at Piney Grove Road where CR 276 turns from southbound to eastbound.

=== County Road 1656 ===
County Road 1656
- Location: Southwestern Jackson County

County Road 1656, formerly SR 276A, was a suffixed alternate of SR 276 that ceased to connect to its parent route, if it ever did in the first place. The route began in Alford three blocks south of the southwestern terminus of the US 231/CR 276 concurrency as Third Avenue and ran east. The name terminates at an unnamed dirt road that runs parallel with Kentucky Street, which is also a dirt road. From there it became Gardenview Road, and wound through much of rural southwestern Jackson County. Three other intersections actually lead back to CR 276, the first being Mill Road, and the next being the only paved intersection east of Alford, Bethlehem Road. The third and last is where the route terminated at CR 167 southwest of Marianna. Due to the lack of connection to its parent route, today this route is County Road 1656.
