= Florida State Road 273 =

State highway in Florida, United States

State Road 273
- SR 273 in red, CR 273 in blue

Route information
- Maintained by FDOT
- Length: 14.509 mi (23.350 km)

Major junctions
- South end: SR 77 in Chipley
- North end: US 231 in Campbellton

Location
- Country: United States
- State: Florida
- Counties: Washington, Jackson

Highway system
- Florida State Highway System; Interstate; US; State; Former; Pre‑1945; Toll; Scenic
← SR 267	→ I-275

State Road 273 (SR 273) is a north–south highway in the panhandle in the U.S. state of Florida that extends from State Road 77 (SR 77) in Chipley to U.S. Route 231 (US 231) in Campbellton. SR 273 runs through both Washington and Jackson counties, and most, if not all of the road is a two-lane undivided highway. Between its termini, SR 273 intersects with no state roads other than former ones. A former section of the road south of Chipley is now County Road 273.

== Route description ==
State Road 273 begins at a blinker-light intersection with State Road 77 in Chipley, Florida as Glenwood Avenue, which is a west-to-east street that continues west as a city local city street until it reaches North First Street. The road remains at this trajectory for the first four blocks, and does not start to turn north until after the intersection with Bennett Drive. From that point on, the road is named the Chipley-Campbellton Highway. During this curve to the north, it encounters the headquarters for the Washington County Department of Parks and Recreation. The remainder of the road is strictly rural. Four local streets are intersected within the county before the road crosses a bridge over a small creek and curves north during its last run through the county. Almost immediately after crossing the Washington-Jackson County Line, it has a blinker-light intersection with County Road 164 (Lovewood Road). Winding around some farmland and taking a curve more toward the east, County Road 193, which is named "Smokey Road" northwest of SR 273, and is an unmarked dirt road named "Smoky Road" southeast of SR 273. After this, it passes one more dirt road and then encounters the western segment of County Road 162 (Rachel Road), which joins SR 273 in a concurrency. After an embankment over some lowland and then climbing a slight grade, SR 273/CR 162 makes another slight right curve where it encounters another blinker-light intersection with County Road 169 (Peanut Road), which unlike the one at CR 164 contains four-way stop signs.

Just west of Jacob City, the eastern segment of County Road 162 (Main Street/Jacob Road) branches off to the southeast on the opposite side of the intersection with Sharon Road, ending the concurrency. After Woodrest Road, SR 273 curves more to the north again. One anomaly along the way is an intersection with a dirt road named "Overpass Road," which is a private road to the west and is a long distance from the Atlanta and Saint Andrews Bay Railway overpass it was named for to the east. After this intersection, the road runs along the east side of the Springhill Landfill, one of the few non-agricultural sites along the road outside of the occasional church. Later, it crosses an abandoned railroad line spanning from the A&SAB main line that runs through Graceville and points west. One last church and cemetery can be found south of where SR 273 finally enters Campbellton just at an unmarked one-lane grass road named Dixie Street. A paved street with the same name is encountered later before the road terminates at a blinker-light intersection with U.S. Route 231. Two dead-end streets can be seen across from the terminus of SR 273, but only one was part of the road once (see below).

== Major intersections ==
County	Location	mi	km	Destinations	Notes
Washington	Chipley	0.000	0.000	SR 77 (Main Street) to US 90 / I-10	
Jackson	Richter Crossroads	4.297	6.915	CR 164 (Lovewood Road)	
Jackson		7.594	12.221	CR 193 north (Smokey Road)	
Jackson		8.530	13.728	CR 162 west (Rachel Road)	
Jackson		9.477	15.252	CR 169 – Graceville, Cottondale	
Jackson		10.817	17.408	CR 162 east – Jacob	
Jackson	Campbellton	14.509	23.350	US 231 (SR 75) – Dothan, Cottondale	
1.000 mi = 1.609 km; 1.000 km = 0.621 mi

== Former segments ==
=== County Road 273 ===
County Road 273
- Location: Gilberts Mill-Chipley

County Road 273 is a county spur of State Road 273. It begins at Elkcam Boulevard in Gilberts Mill, Florida as Orange Hill Road. Here, the road winds around an unfinished development as well as some other local land and doesn't straighten out until it meets a cotton field across from Ledger Road. North of there, the road runs relatively straight north until it takes one more slight curve to the left before encountering the eastern terminus of County Road 278(Pioneer Road). This trajectory continues through a patch of scrub land until it curves back to the north, running mostly through small forests interrupted by dirt roads and local residencies. The one exception to these road is an intersection with the paved Sunday Road. North of there, farmland begins to take the place of forestland as the road approaches a much more important intersection, specifically the short concurrency with County Road 276 beginning at Alford Road, then running past a firehouse before ending at Clayton Road where CR 276 turns west at the corner of an abandoned gas station.

Farmland becomes much more prevalent north of this point, especially after one tree-lined culvert beneath the road. The next major intersection is the west end of Southern County Road 280 (Corbin Road), which leads to Steele City in Jackson County. Next is Joiner Road, a local street leading west towards Falling Waters State Park. After passing a local nursery and then intersecting a local one-lane street named Deerpath Road, CR 273 takes a sharp curve to the northwest, where the farms diminish, but don't completely disappear until the route intersects a street named Foxworth Road, the elongated southwestern frontage road for a bridge over Interstate 10 with no access that becomes a dirt road once it curves along the eastbound lanes of I-10. A northeastern frontage road for this bridge can also be found that is just as elongated, but with even less pavement. Between Earlene Lane and Donnell Road CR 273 curves slightly to the right, but still continues to run northwest and southeast. Part of the Chipley City Limits are encountered just before the last moderate intersection, a northern segment of County Road 280 (Brickyard Road) that seemingly has no connection with the previous CR 280. One small industrial park and a local dead-end street can be found before the route makes a sharp left turn onto South Boulevard before finally intersecting State Road 77, which would seem to continue northbound in a hidden concurrency to eventually reunite with SR 273, especially judging by one of the sign trees along SR 77. Instead CR 273 extends along the rest of South Boulevard to the west, serving as the southern terminus of the South Third Street Historic District then leaving the city limits at Hoyt Street, and finally ends at State Road 277.

=== Chipley Street and Elaville Road ===
Besides CR 273, two other former segments exist in the Campbellton area, none of which are marked as either state or county roads. The first is Chipley Road which begins as a dead-end street across from the northern terminus. This road is north of the beginning of a former segment of State Road 2 which is also a dead end at US 231. Chipley Road ends at the existing SR 2 across from a Campbellton municipal block that includes a fire station and community center as well as two water towers.

The second segment is Elaville Road which runs east from US 231, north of SR 2. After the grade crossing with the former Atlanta and Saint Andrews Bay Railway main line it encounters a fork in the road with Long Pine Street. Ellaville Road turns to the northeast. Most of the surroundings are forest land, although some clearances for farmland and other uses can be found as the road curves further north. This former segment of SR 273 ends at a dirt road named Rambo Road. FDOT maps and others still incorrectly regard this as being part of SR 273.
