= List of county roads in Holmes County, Florida =

- County road shields used in Florida

Highway names
- Interstates: Interstate X (I-X)
- US Highways: U.S. Highway X (US X)
- State: State Road X (SR X)
- County: County Road X (CR-X)

System links
- County roads in Florida; County roads in Holmes County

The following is a list of county roads in Holmes County, Florida. All county roads are maintained by the county in which they reside.

== County roads in Holmes County ==
Route	Road Name(s)	From	To	Notes
CR 2		CR 2 at the Walton County line southwest of Royals Crossroads	SR 81 / CR 2A in Royals Crossroads	Former SR 2; inventoried by FDOT as part of SR 2, but signed as CR 2
CR 2A		SR 81 / CR 2 in Royals Crossroads	CR 185 east-northeast of Royals Crossroads	Former SR 2A
CR 10A	Old Spanish Trail Railroad Street; Pirate Cove Road Old US 90; Oak Grove Church Road	CR 10A at the Walton County line northeast of Argyle US 90 (SR 10) in Ponce de Leon US 90 (SR 10) northeast of Ponce de Leon	US 90 (SR 10) west of Ponce de Leon US 90 (SR 10) in Long Pond Hill US 90 (SR 10) northeast of Ponce de Leon	Former SR 10A Former SR 10A; abandoned segment exists east of Oak Grove Church Road.
CR 65	Roping Road; Smith Chapel Road; Love Road	CR 177A / Monroe Paul Road southwest of Bethlehem	Windy Hill Road at the Alabama state line north-northwest of Bethlehem	Dirt road
CR 81A	Otter Creek Road; Sandy Creek Road	CR 10A west-northwest of Ponce de Leon	Unnamed road west-southwest of Bunker Hill	Former SR 81A
CR 160		SR 81 / Jones Loop / Gillman Road in Hobbs Crossroads CR 177 / Pinestraw Alley Road in Bethlehem	CR 179A in Barker Store SR 79 south of Esto	Former SR 160
CR 162		CR 181 / Hickory Hill Road in Hickory Hill CR 173 north-northeast of Bonifay	CR 179A / Buck Rogers Drive in Cerrogordo CR 162 at the Jackson County line northeast of Bonifay	Former SR 162 Former SR 162
CR 163		SR 2 / Peak Road northeast of Hobbs Crossroads	CR 31 at the Alabama state line north-northeast of Hobbs Crossroads	Former SR 163
CR 171		SR 2 in Eleanor	SR 103 at the Alabama state line north-northeast of Cobb Cross Roads	Former SR 171
CR 173	Jenkins Boulevard Holmes Avenue; McGee Road East North Avenue	CR 173 / Pipkin Road at the Washington County line in Bonifay SR 79 in Bonifay SR 79 / CR 177A in Bonifay	CR 173 in Bonifay US 90 (SR 10) / McGee Road in Bonifay CR 49 at the Alabama state line northwest of Cobb Cross Roads	Former SR 173
CR 175	Main Street	SR 2 in Noma	Main Street / Tindell Street in Noma	Former SR 175; Main Street becomes a dirt road north of Tindell Street.
CR 177		SR 79 north-northeast of Bonifay	CR 61 at the Alabama state line east-northeast of Smith Crossroads	Former SR 177
CR 177A	West North Avenue; Bonifay–Geneva Highway	SR 79 / CR 173 in Bonifay	CR 53 at the Alabama state line north-northwest of Smith Crossroads	Former SR 177A
CR 179	Caryville-Geneva Road	CR 179 at the Washington County line in Caryville	CR 89 at the Alabama state line north-northeast of Pittman	Former SR 179
CR 179A	Pine Street; Hawkins Street	CR 181 in Westville	CR 33 at the Alabama state line northwest of Pittman	Former SR 179A
CR 181	Pine Street; North Cypress Street	CR 181 at the Walton County line southeast of Ponce de Leon	CR 181 at the Walton County line north-northwest of Leonia	Former SR 181
CR 181A	Ponce de Leon Springs Road; Old Mill Road	CR 181A at the Walton County line south-southeast of Ponce de Leon	Old Mill Road in Ponce de Leon	Former SR 181A
CR 183A		CR 10A northwest of Ponce de Leon	CR 183A at the Walton County line south-southwest of Prosperity	Former SR 183A
CR 185	Petty Crossroads	CR 185 at the Walton County line south-southwest of Leonia	SR 27 at the Alabama state line east-northeast of Royals Crossroads	Former SR 185 (earlier SR 183)
