= Florida State Road 2 =

State highway in Florida, United States

State Road 2
- The two portions of SR 2 highlighted in red

Route information
- Maintained by FDOT
- Length: 78.993 mi (127.127 km)
- Existed: 1945 renumbering (definition)–present

Western section
- Length: 63.454 mi (102.119 km)
- West end: SR 81 / CR 2 / CR 2A near Sweet Gum Head
- Major intersections: US 231 in Campbellton
- East end: SR 91 towards Donalsonville, GA

Eastern section
- Length: 15.539 mi (25.008 km)
- West end: SR 94 towards Fargo, GA
- East end: SR 94 towards St. George, GA

Location
- Country: United States
- State: Florida
- Counties: Holmes, Jackson, Columbia, Baker

Highway system
- Florida State Highway System; Interstate; US; State; Former; Pre‑1945; Toll; Scenic
← SR A1A	→ SR 3

State Road 2 (SR 2) is the designation of two east–west state highways in Florida, each having at least one terminus at that state's border with Georgia. Both segments lie entirely within 4 miles (6 km) of Florida's northern boundary.

== Route description ==
The western segment of SR 2 extends 63 miles (101 km) from its western terminus (an intersection with SR 81) south of Sweet Gum Head, Florida to the Georgia border near Bascom, Florida. The road continues across the Chattahoochee River and becomes Georgia State Route 91 in Seminole County, Georgia near Donalsonville. The predominantly rural SR 2 passes through the towns of Pittman, Noma, Campbellton, and Malone as it crosses Holmes and Jackson Counties in the Florida panhandle.

The eastern segment of SR 2 is a 15-mile-long (24 km) road crossing the Okefenokee Swamp as it connects two separate sections of Georgia State Route 94 between Council, Georgia and Moniac, Georgia. This portion of the highway is extremely deserted and is traveled on very rarely. With most of the roadway constructed adjacent to a track maintained and operated by the Norfolk Southern Railway, it serves no Florida municipalities (although Taylor, Florida is ten miles (16 km) to the south in Baker County). SR 2 clips the northeastern corner of Columbia County with the segment's westernmost mile. Within Baker County, it passes through the John M. Bethea State Forest and an agricultural inspection station on the southeast corner of CR 127 before the road crosses the first bridge over the St Mary's River. The routing of SR 2 continues as County Road 2 (CR 2) at the Florida border in Nassau County just east of St. George, Georgia for about 1 mile (1.6 km) until its intersection with CR 121.

== Major intersections ==
County	Location	mi	km	Destinations	Notes
Holmes	Royals Crossroads	0.000	0.000	SR 81 north / CR 2 west / CR 2A east – Darlington, Geneva, Samson	Western terminus of SR 2; northern terminus of concurrency with SR 81
Holmes		2.682	4.316	CR 185 (Petty Crossroads) – Leonia, Sweet Gum Head	
Holmes		3.718	5.984	SR 81 south – Ponce de Leon	Southern terminus of concurrency with SR 81
Holmes		6.617	10.649	CR 163 north	Southern terminus of CR 163
Holmes		9.561	15.387	CR 179A – Geneva, Westville	
Holmes	Pittman	13.115	21.107	CR 179 – Geneva, Caryville	
Holmes		14.750	23.738	CR 65 (Roping Road)	
Holmes		16.599	26.714	CR 177A – Geneva, Bonifay	
Holmes	Miller Crossroads	17.842	28.714	CR 177 – Black, Bonifay	
Holmes	Esto–Holland Crossroads line	23.739	38.204	SR 79 – Hartford, Bonifay	
Holmes	Noma	25.561	41.136	CR 175 north (Main Street)	Southern terminus of CR 175
Holmes	Tendil Crossing	28.063	45.163	CR 173	
Holmes		30.616	49.272	CR 171 north	Southern terminus of CR 171
Jackson	Graceville	31.881	51.307	SR 77 north (Cotton Street) – Dothan	west end of SR 77 overlap
Jackson	Graceville	32.245	51.893	SR 77 south (Cotton Street) – Chipley	east end of SR 77 overlap
Jackson	Graceville	32.403	52.148	CR 169 (Cliff Street) – Cottondale	
Jackson		34.417	55.389	CR 193 south (Smokey Road)	Southern terminus of concurrency with CR 193
Jackson		34.665	55.788	CR 193 north (Browntown Road)	Northern terminus of concurrency with CR 193
Jackson	Campbellton	39.071	62.879	US 231 (SR 75) to SR 273 south – Dothan, Cottondale	
Jackson		49.256	79.270	CR 167 (Old US Road)	
Jackson	Malone	53.948	86.821	SR 71 (10th Street) – Dothan, Greenwood	
Jackson		56.881	91.541	CR 165 south (Basswood Road) – Bascom	Northern terminus of CR 165
Jackson		62.407	100.434	CR 164 (Timberlane Road)	
Jackson	Neals Landing	63.454	102.119	SR 91 north – Donalsonville	Georgia state line (Chattahoochee River bridge)
Gap in route
Columbia		0.000	0.000	SR 94 west – Fargo	Georgia state line
Baker	Baxter	15.285	24.599	CR 127 – Sanderson	
Baker		15.539	25.008	SR 94 east – St. George	Georgia state line (St. Marys River bridge)
1.000 mi = 1.609 km; 1.000 km = 0.621 mi: Concurrency terminus

== County Road 2A ==
County Road 2A
- Location: New Harmony
- Length: 9.070 mi (14.597 km)

County Road 2A
- Location: Royals Crossroads
- Length: 2.352 mi (3.785 km)

County Road 2A, formerly State Road 2A, exists in two segments. The first is a short spur that runs into the town of New Harmony in Walton County, and the second runs from the Walton-Holmes County line, through Royals Crossroads and SR 2/SR 81, to CR 185. The road is signed as County Road 2A.
