= Shady Grove, Florida =

Shady Grove may refer to the following places in the U.S. state of Florida:

- Shady Grove, Jackson County, Florida
- Shady Grove, Taylor County, Florida
