= Florida State Road 79 =

Highway in Florida

State Road 79
- SR 79 highlighted in red

Route information
- Maintained by FDOT
- Length: 60.673 mi (97.644 km)

Major junctions
- South end: US 98 in Panama City Beach
- SR 20 in Ebro; SR 277 in Vernon; I-10 in Bonifay; US 90 in Bonifay; SR 2 in Esto
- North end: SR 167 near Esto

Location
- Country: United States
- State: Florida
- Counties: Bay, Washington, Holmes

Highway system
- Florida State Highway System; Interstate; US; State; Former; Pre‑1945; Toll; Scenic
← SR 78	→ SR 80

State Road 79 (SR 79) is a north–south highway in the panhandle of Florida. It is a popular route for tourists to and from the Panama City Beach area. The route begins at U.S. Route 98 in Panama City Beach and runs to its northern terminus at the Florida–Alabama border, where it continues north as Alabama State Route 167. Currently, the highway is being expanded to four lanes north of Panama City to the junction with Interstate 10. SR 79 is a major hurricane evacuation route from the coastal area. It is one of few designated routes northward between Pensacola and Panama City.

== History ==
As of June 1, 2009, the route between US 98 (Back Beach Road) at Panama City Beach and SR 20 at Ebro was being expanded to four lanes. A second bridge over the Gulf Intracoastal Waterway at West Bay has been completed and is now open making the four lane complete for about a 5-mile (8.0 km) stretch from US 98 northward to the intersection of SR 79 and SR 388 at West Bay. North of this completed stretch construction continues to a point just north of the Ebro Greyhound Racetrack. As of 2023, after ten years of work construction from north of Ebro to Interstate 10 has not been completed. A dangerous section in Vernon has been abandoned by crews for years and left with cones diverting traffic on a hilly part of the road. Also in 2023, the Y intersection with Front Beach Road in Panama City Beach was replaced with a roundabout.

== Major intersections ==
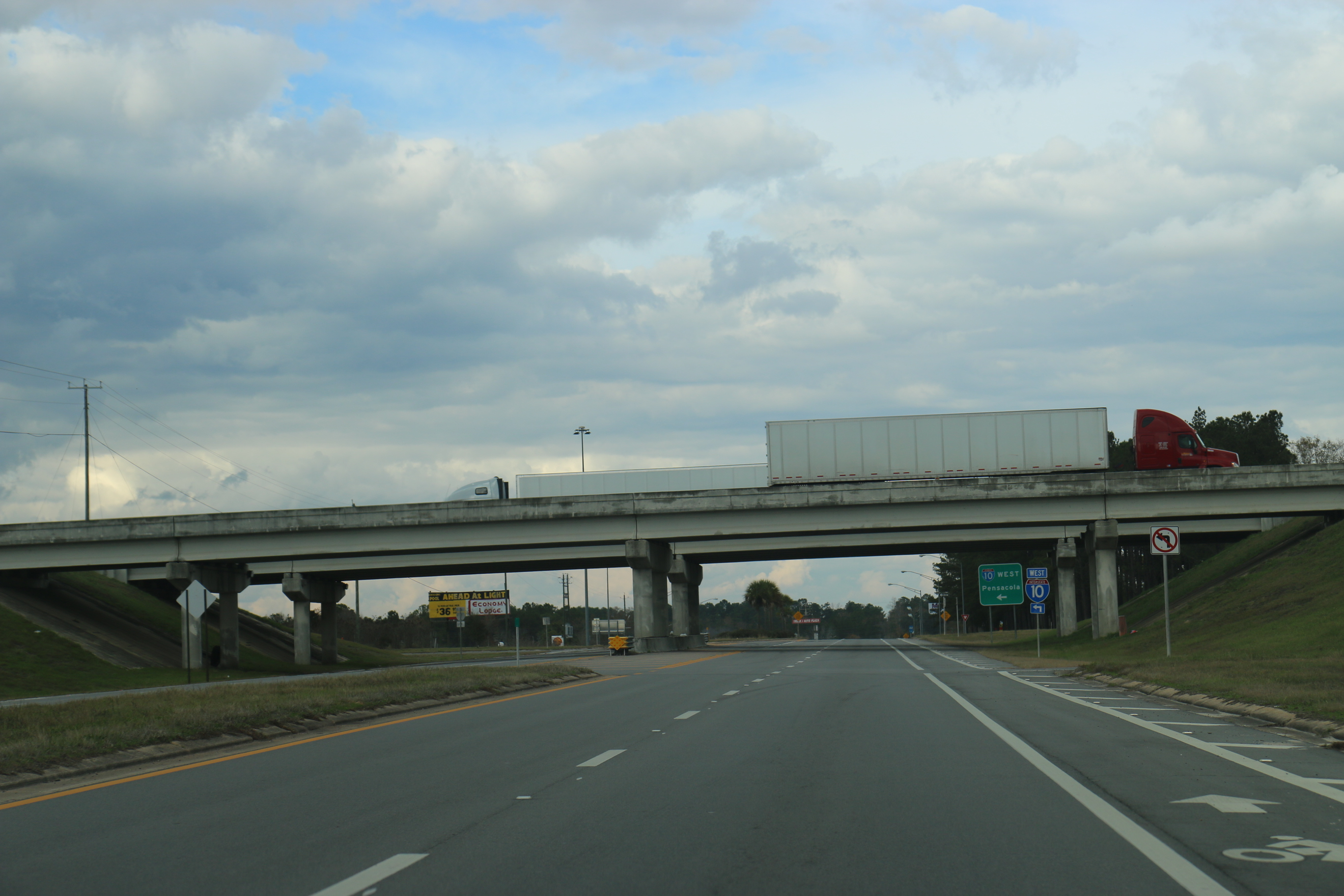
SR 79 at Interstate 10 in Bonifay

County	Location	mi	km	Destinations	Notes
Bay	Panama City Beach	0.000	0.000	SR 30 (Front Beach Road)	Roundabout
Bay	Panama City Beach	0.531	0.855	US 98 (Panama City Beach Parkway / SR 30A) – Destin, Panama City	
Bay	West Bay	5.37	8.64	B.V. Buchanan Bridge over West Bay	
Bay	West Bay	5.768	9.283	CR 388 east – Northwest Florida Beaches International Airport	Former Florida State Road 388
Bay	West Bay	7.040	11.330	SR 388 east – Northwest Florida Beaches International Airport	
Bay		12.343	19.864	CR 2296 west (Pine Log Road)	
Washington	Ebro	16.023	25.787	SR 20 (Captain Fritz Road) – Freeport, Blountstown	
Washington	New Hope	26.817	43.158	CR 284 west (Millers Ferry Road)	
Washington		31.122	50.086	Fanning Branch Road	former SR 277 south
Washington	Vernon	33.935	54.613	CR 279 south (Moss Hill Road) – Dogwood Acres, Moss Hill Church	
Washington	Vernon	34.189	55.022	SR 277 north (Court Avenue) – Chipley	
Washington		34.608	55.696	CR 278 west (Creek Road)	
Washington		34.786	55.983	CR 279 north (Pate Pond Road)	
Washington		42.262	68.014	CR 280 (Douglas Ferry Road)	
Holmes	Bonifay	44.25	71.21	I-10 (SR 8) – Pensacola, Tallahassee	I-10 exit 112
Holmes	Bonifay	46.074	74.149	US 90 (SR 10) – Caryville, Chipley	
Holmes	Bonifay	47.069	75.750	CR 173 north (North Avenue) / CR 177A north – Airport	
Holmes		48.479	78.019	CR 177 north	
Holmes		55.492	89.306	CR 160	
Holmes	Holland Crossroads–Esto line	58.567	94.254	SR 2 – Miller Crossroads, Graceville	
Holmes	Esto	60.673	97.644	SR 167 north – Hartford	
1.000 mi = 1.609 km; 1.000 km = 0.621 mi
