= Grady W. Courtney =

American politician (1918–1994)

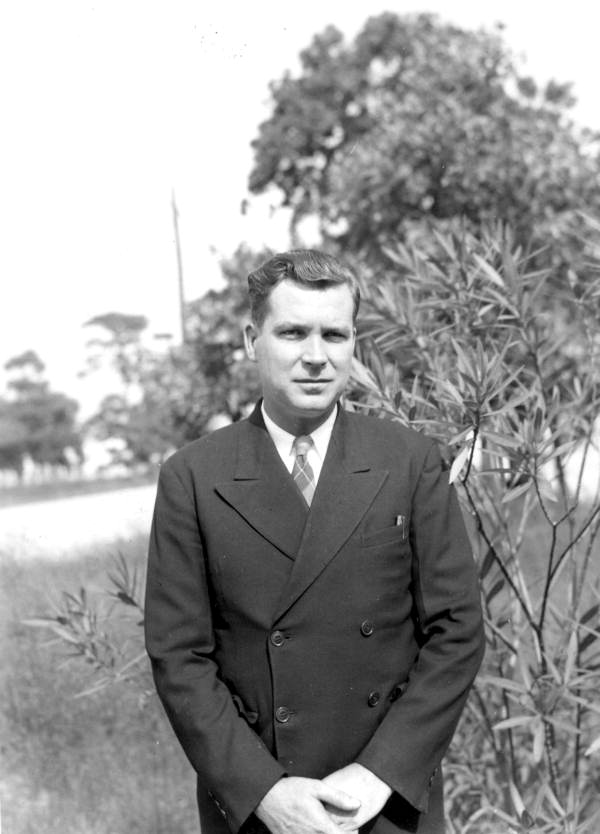
- Courtney in 1947

Member of the Florida House of Representatives from Bay County
- In office 1947–1951

Personal details
- Born: February 13, 1918 Graceville, Florida, U.S.
- Died: December 17, 1994 (aged 76)
- Party: Democratic

Grady W. Courtney (February 13, 1918 – December 17, 1994) was an American politician. He served as a Democratic member of the Florida House of Representatives.

== Life and career ==
Courtney was born in Graceville, Florida. He attended Graceville High School.

Courtney served in the Florida House of Representatives from 1947 to 1951.

Courtney died on December 17, 1994, at the age of 76.
