= Tri-County Airport (Florida) =

Airport in Florida, U.S.

Coordinates: 30°50′44.8″N 085°36′05.0″W

- IATA: none; ICAO: KBCR; FAA LID: BCR

Summary
- Airport type: Public use
- Owner: Tri-County Airport Authority
- Operator: Tri-County Airport Authority
- Serves: Bonifay, Florida Chipley, Florida Graceville, Florida Panama City, Florida
- Location: Holmes County, Florida
- Elevation AMSL: 85 ft (26 m)
- Website: http://www.kbcr.gov
- Interactive map of Tri-County Airport

Runways
Direction	Length		Surface
Direction	ft	m	Surface
01/19	5,398	1,645	Asphalt

Statistics (2021)
- Aircraft operations: 28,376
- Based aircraft: 43
- Source: Federal Aviation Administration

Tri-County Airport (FAA LID: KBCR) is a public-use airport located in unincorporated Holmes County, Florida, United States, 5.1 nautical miles (9.4 km) northeast of the central business district of the city of Bonifay and 5.3 miles (8.5 km) northwest of the central business district of Chipley, in Washington County. These communities are in the western Florida panhandle. Created by an act of the Florida legislature in 1969, the airport is publicly owned (as an independent public entity) and serves the Florida communities of Bonifay, Chipley and Graceville, as well as serving as a feeder/general aviation airport for Panama City, Florida and Dothan, Alabama.

== Facilities and aircraft ==
Tri-County Airport covers an area of 304 acres (123 ha) at an average runway elevation of 85 feet (25.9 m) above mean sea level. It has one runway designated 01/19 with an asphalt surface measuring 5,398 by 75 feet (1,645 x 22.9 m).

For the 12-month period ending December 31, 2021, the airport had 28,376 aircraft operations, an average of 78 per day: 70% military, 30% general aviation, and less than 1% air taxi. As of May 24, 2022, there are 40 aircraft based at this airport: 10% multi-engine and 90% single-engine. Corporate jet aircraft began basing at the large north (corporate) hangars in 2022.

The airport provides commercial hangars, large hangars, box hangars, T-hangars, shade hangars and tie-downs. It provides a fuel discount to tenants with a current lease. The airport terminal building (open 24 hours daily) includes a pilot lounge, conference room, kitchen, break room, restrooms and shower (with internet connection information posted in the lobby), and an airport office. There is an oversized couch in the lobby should pilots need to sleep overnight. Self-service fuel is available from an automated pump 24 hours; a helipad is adjacent to the fuel pumps.

In June 2023 the airport completed a major project that greatly enhanced public parking, improved the terminal entrances, enhanced pedestrian security, revamped the septic system and added new signage. The runways and taxiways were scrubbed and re-marked in May 2023. There are significant additional projects planned by the airport and the Florida Department of Transportation to include obstacle removal, major electrical upgrades, storm water mitigation and additional terminals.

On November 5, 2020, the common traffic advisory frequency changed to 122.725 and on December 2, 2022, the airport identifier changed from 1J0 to KBCR. A second instrument approach (RNAV 01) was also added.

== Tri-County Airport Authority ==
The public-use airport is governed by the Tri-County Airport Authority, an independent “special use district” created by the Florida legislature in July 1969. The County Commissioners of Holmes, Jackson and Washington County (Florida) each appoint 3 members who serve three-year terms on the board as unpaid volunteers. The board meets at the airport conference room on the second Tuesday afternoon of every month at 5:00 PM and its meeting agendas, annual budgets, proceedings, policies, rules, regulations and reports are published on its public website. Members of the Board are pilots and non-pilots who have an interest in the welfare of the airport and surrounding communities.

== See also ==
- List of airports in Florida
