= Round Lake, Florida =

Unincorporated community in Florida, U.S.

Coordinates: 30°39′06″N 85°23′20″W

Round Lake is an unincorporated community south of Alford and north of Panama City on U.S. 231 in Jackson County, Florida, United States.

Via US 231, the town of Alford is 3 mi (5 km) north, and Panama City is 42 mi (68 km) south-southwest.
