= Sweet Gum Head, Florida =

- Unincorporated community
- Location within Florida Location within the United States
- Coordinates: 30°58′48″N 85°57′34″W
- Country: United States
- State: Florida
- County: Holmes
- Elevation: 171 ft (52 m)
- Time zone: UTC-6 (Central (CST))
  - Summer (DST): UTC-5 (CDT)
- Area code: 850
- GNIS feature ID: 291932

Sweet Gum Head is an unincorporated community in Holmes County, Florida, United States. The community is located along Holmes County Road 2A near Holmes County Road 185.
