= List of county roads in Washington County, Florida =

- County road shields used in Florida

Highway names
- Interstates: Interstate X (I-X)
- US Highways: U.S. Highway X (US X)
- State: State Road X (SR X)
- County: County Road X (CR-X)

System links
- County roads in Florida; County roads in Washington County

The following is a list of county roads in Washington County, Florida. All county roads are maintained by the county in which they reside.

== County roads in Washington County ==
Route	Road Name(s)	From	To	Notes
CR 77A	State Park Road; Falling Waters Road	SR 77	SR 77	former SR 77A
CR 156	Sunday Road Road	South of Bush Road	CR 273	former SR 156
CR 166	Old Bonifay Road	Holmes-Washington County Line	SR 77	former SR 166
CR 170	Wilderness Road	CR 280	CR 279	former SR 170
CR 173	Saint Mary Road; Bethal Road	CR 280	Washington-Holmes County Line	former SR 173
CR 179	Wrights Creek Road	US 90	Washington-Holmes County Line	former SR 179
CR 273	E.L. Kham Boulevard; Washington Boulevard; Orange Hill Road; South Boulevard	SR 77	SR 277	former SR 273
CR 276	Piney Grove Road; Clayton Road; Alford Highway	SR 277	Washington-Jackson County Line	former SR 276
CR 276A	Clayton Road	SR 77	CR 276	former SR 276A
CR 277	Fanning Branch Road	Holmes Valley Road	SR 79	former SR 277
CR 277	Cope Road	CR 166	Washington-Jackson County Line	former SR 277
CR 278	Creek Road; Pioneer Road		CR 273	former SR 278
CR 278A	Bonnet Pond Road	Mud Hill Road	SR 277	former SR 278A
CR 279	Moss Hill Road; Main Street; Pate Pond Road; Waits Avenue	SR 77	US 90	former SR 279 split by SR 79 between Moss Hill Road and Pate Pond Road
CR 280	Douglas Ferry Road; Brickyard Road; Corbin Road	CR 284	Washington-Jackson County Line	former SR 280
CR 284	Millers Ferry Road; River Road	SR 79	CR 279	former SR 284
CR 284A	Potter's Spring Road; Shell Landing Road	SR 79	CR 284	former SR 284A
