= South Third Street Historic District (Chipley, Florida) =

Historic district in Florida, United States

- South 3rd Street Historic District
- U.S. National Register of Historic Places
- U.S. Historic district
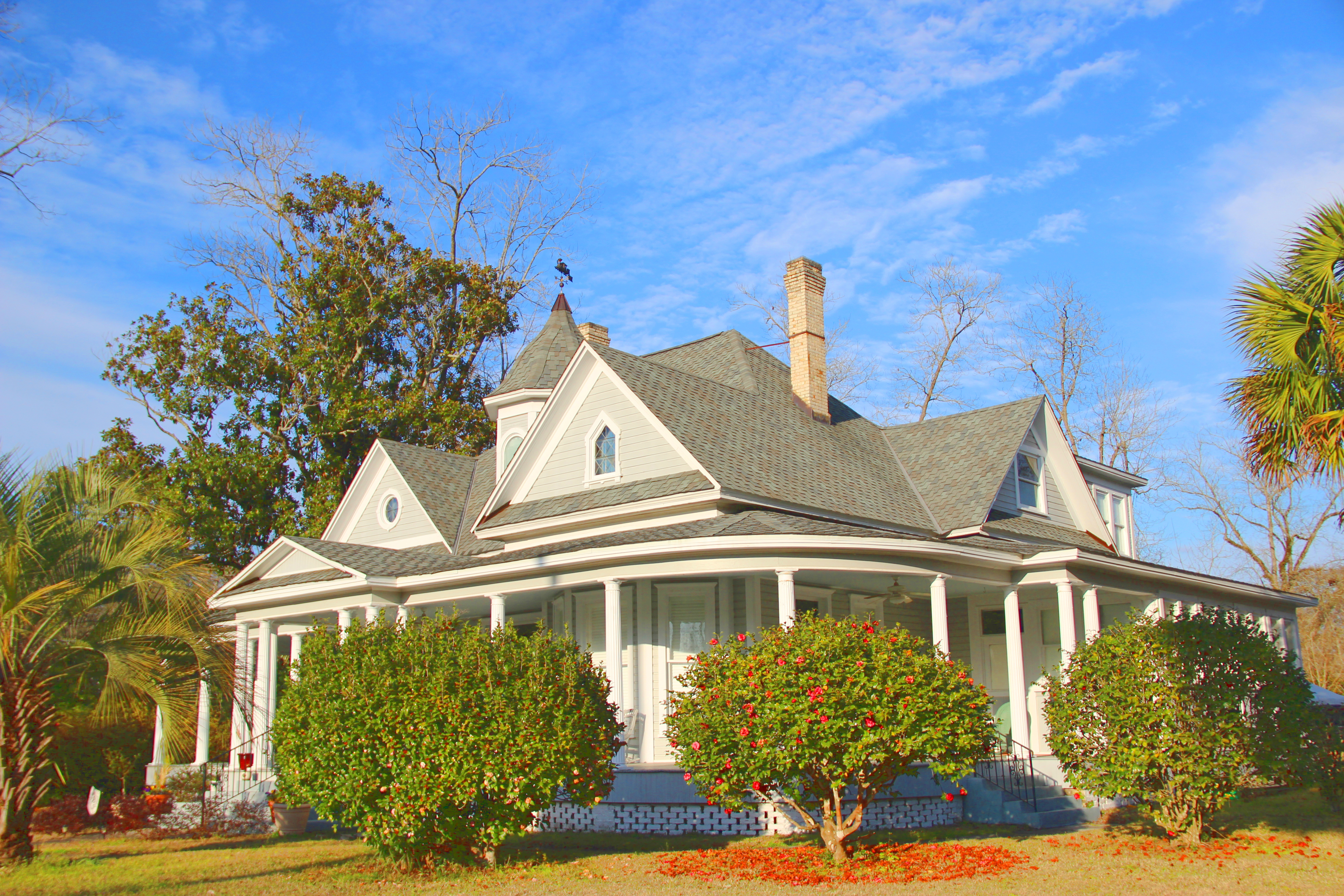
- Queen Anne home on Third St, built circa 1897

- Location within Florida Location within the United States
- Location: Chipley, Florida, US
- Coordinates: 30°46′29.3″N 85°32′32.4″W
- Area: 250 acres (1.0 km^{2})
- NRHP reference No.: 89000045
- Added to NRHP: February 21, 1989

The South 3rd Street Historic District is a U.S. historic district (designated as such on February 21, 1989) located in Chipley, Florida. The district is on South 3rd Street between Jackson Avenue (Highway 90) and South Boulevard. It contains 13 historic buildings, many of which are of the Queen Anne Victorian style.
