= Bascom, Florida =

- Town
- Location of Bascom in Jackson County, Florida
- Coordinates: 30°55′40″N 85°07′05″W
- Country: United States
- State: Florida
- County: Jackson
- Founded: c. 1901
- Incorporated: 1961

Government
  - Type: Mayor-Council
  - Mayor: Billy James
  - Councilors: Betty James, Tony Pelham, and Gernard Russ
  - Town Clerk: Chrystal R. Bryan
  - Town Attorney: Daniel H. Cox

Area
  - Total: 0.24 sq mi (0.62 km^{2})
  - Land: 0.24 sq mi (0.62 km^{2})
  - Water: 0 sq mi (0.00 km^{2})
- Elevation: 138 ft (42 m)

Population (2020)
  - Total: 87
  - Density: 362.2/sq mi (139.83/km^{2})
- Time zone: UTC-6 (Central (CST))
  - Summer (DST): UTC-5 (CDT)
- ZIP code: 32423
- Area code(s): 850, 448
- FIPS code: 12-03725
- GNIS feature ID: 2405210

Bascom is a town in Jackson County, Florida, United States. The town is located on the Florida Panhandle in North Florida, and is 5 miles (8 km) south of the Alabama border. The population was 87 at the time of the 2020 census.

== Geography ==
The Town of Bascom is located in northeastern Jackson County. It is 4 miles (6 km) southeast of Malone, 5 miles (8 km) northeast of Greenwood, and 14 miles (23 km) northeast of Marianna, the Jackson County seat.

According to the United States Census Bureau, Bascom has a total area of 0.24 square miles (0.62 km^{2}), all land.

== Climate ==
The climate in this area is characterized by hot, humid summers and generally mild winters. According to the Köppen climate classification, the Town of Bascom has a humid subtropical climate zone (Cfa).

== Demographics ==
Historical population
Census	Pop.	Note	%±
1970	87		—
1980	134		54.0%
1990	90		−32.8%
2000	106		17.8%
2010	121		14.2%
2020	87		−28.1%
U.S. Decennial Census

=== 2010 and 2020 census ===
Bascom racial composition (Hispanics excluded from racial categories) (NH = Non-Hispanic)
Race	Pop 2010	Pop 2020	% 2010	% 2020
White (NH)	105	74	86.78%	85.06%
Black or African American (NH)	12	9	9.92%	10.34%
Native American or Alaska Native (NH)	0	0	0.00%	0.00%
Asian (NH)	0	0	0.00%	0.00%
Pacific Islander or Native Hawaiian (NH)	0	0	0.00%	0.00%
Some other race (NH)	0	0	0.00%	0.00%
Two or more races/Multiracial (NH)	0	0	0.00%	0.00%
Hispanic or Latino (any race)	4	4	3.31%	4.60%
Total	121	87		

As of the 2020 United States census, there were 87 people, 47 households, and 36 families residing in the town.

As of the 2010 United States census, there were 121 people, 70 households, and 52 families residing in the town.

=== 2000 census ===
As of the census of 2000, there were 106 people, 41 households, and 33 families residing in the town. The population density was 448.3 inhabitants per square mile (173.1/km^{2}). There were 49 housing units at an average density of 207.2 per square mile (80.0/km^{2}). The racial makeup of the town was 100.00% White.

In 2000, there were 41 households, out of which 26.8% had children under the age of 18 living with them, 65.9% were married couples living together, 12.2% had a female householder with no husband present, and 19.5% were non-families. 19.5% of all households were made up of individuals, and 12.2% had someone living alone who was 65 years of age or older. The average household size was 2.59 and the average family size was 2.97.

In 2000, in the town, the population was spread out, with 26.4% under the age of 18, 4.7% from 18 to 24, 25.5% from 25 to 44, 28.3% from 45 to 64, and 15.1% who were 65 years of age or older. The median age was 39 years. For every 100 females, there were 112.0 males. For every 100 females age 18 and over, there were 95.0 males.

In 2000, the median income for a household in the town was $27,000, and the median income for a family was $30,208. Males had a median income of $26,250 versus $15,000 for females. The per capita income for the town was $11,305. There were 6.5% of families and 6.3% of the population living below the poverty line, including 8.1% of under eighteens and 11.8% of those over 64.

== Notable people ==
- Henry Bidleman Bascom (1796–1850), Congressional chaplain and a Methodist bishop
- Faye Dunaway (born 1941), actress
