= Chattahoochee State Park =

Former public recreation area in Alabama

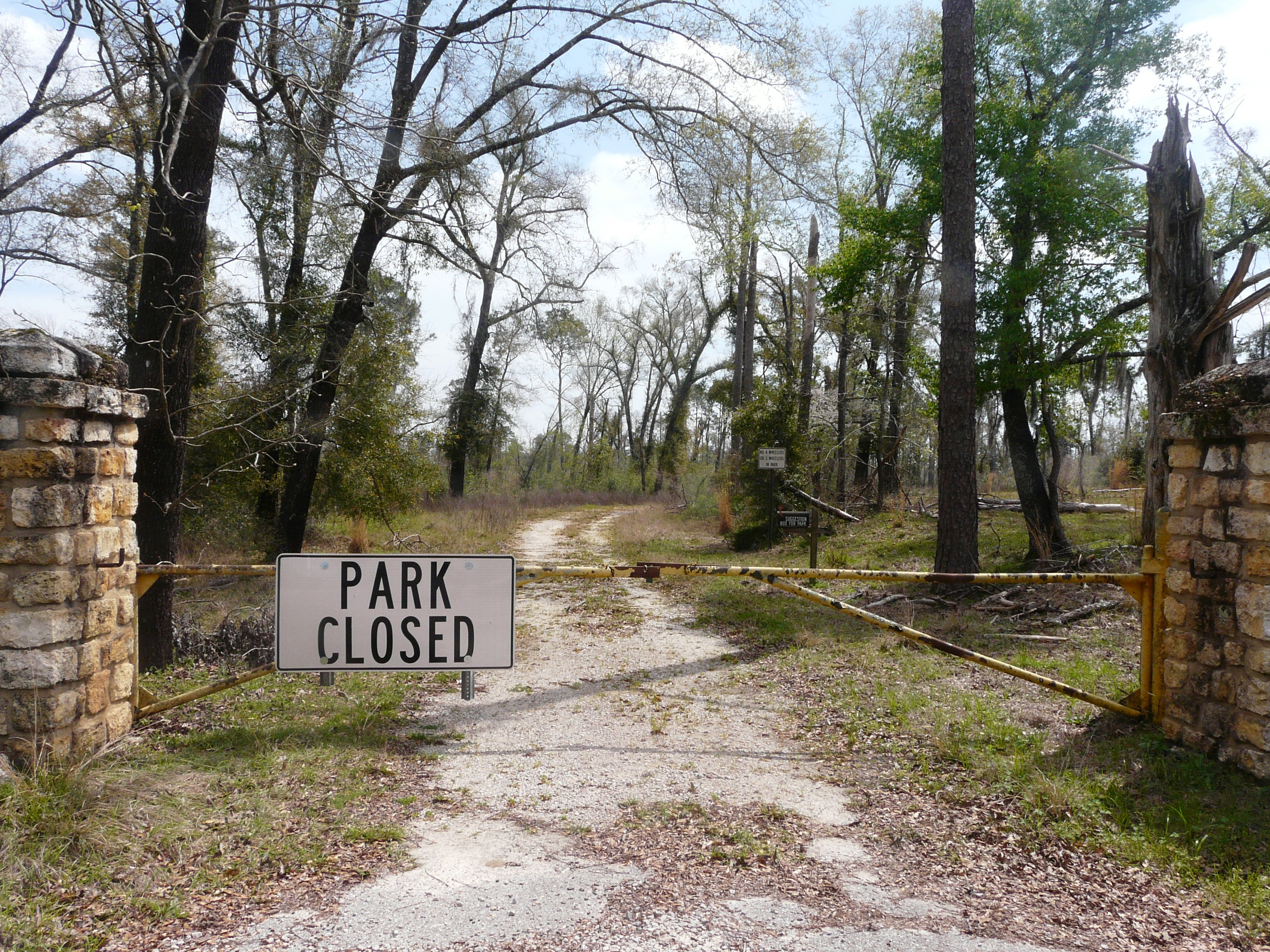
- Gate for the closed park

- Location within Alabama
- Interactive map of Chattahoochee State Park
- Location: Houston County, Alabama, United States
- Coordinates: 31°00′27″N 85°01′59″W
- Area: 596 acres (241 ha)
- Elevation: 118 ft (36 m)
- Established: 1930s
- Closed: 2018

Chattahoochee State Park was a public recreation area located in the extreme southeast corner of Alabama operated by the government of Houston County, Alabama. The park occupied 596 acres (241 ha) along Irwin's Mill Creek on the Florida-Alabama border. It closed following the destruction of much of the park by Hurricane Michael in 2018.

== History ==
Land near the park was the site of an 1818 skirmish in the First Seminole War.

The state park was developed by members of the Civilian Conservation Corps during the 1930s. Their handiwork included a natural stone dam built to create the 23-acre (9.3 ha) CC Pond and the park's dirt roads. At one time, chimneys and other remnants of the camp where CCC workers lived could be found.

The majority of the park's facilities and trees were destroyed by Hurricane Michael in October 2018; subsequently the park was permanently closed due to the state lacking sufficient funds to clear, repair and rebuild the park. In 2022, slow progress was being made on reopening the park; it was hoped to have the park reopened in 2024.
