= Shady Grove, Jackson County, Florida =

- Unincorporated community
- Location within Florida Location within the United States
- Coordinates: 30°39′11″N 84°59′47″W
- Country: United States
- State: Florida
- County: Jackson
- Elevation: 184 ft (56 m)
- Time zone: UTC-6 (Central (CST))
  - Summer (DST): UTC-5 (CDT)
- Area code: 850
- GNIS feature ID: 295614

Shady Grove is an unincorporated community in Jackson County, Florida, United States. The community is located along County Road 280, 5.7 miles (9.2 km) southwest of Sneads.
