= Alford, Florida =

- Town
- Town of Alford
- Location of Alford in Jackson County, Florida.
- Coordinates: 30°41′48″N 85°23′43″W
- Country: United States
- State: Florida
- County: Jackson
- Settled: c. Early 1900s
- Incorporated: 1959

Government
  - Type: Mayor-Council
  - Mayor: George Gay
  - Council Members: Stephanie Jenkins, Somer Holland, Stephen Petorak, and Brad Griffin
  - Town Clerk: Silvestra Tharp
  - Town Attorney: A. Clay Milton

Area
  - Total: 1.07 sq mi (2.78 km^{2})
  - Land: 1.05 sq mi (2.73 km^{2})
  - Water: 0.019 sq mi (0.05 km^{2})
- Elevation: 125 ft (38 m)

Population (2020)
  - Total: 484
  - Density: 458.9/sq mi (177.19/km^{2})
- Time zone: UTC-6 (Central (CST))
  - Summer (DST): UTC-5 (CDT)
- ZIP code: 32420
- Area code(s): 850, 448
- FIPS code: 12-00625
- GNIS feature ID: 2405131
- Website: www.alfordfl.com

Alford is a town in Jackson County, Florida, United States. The Town of Alford is located on the Florida Panhandle near Marianna, in North Florida. The population was 484 at the 2020 census.

== Geography ==
The town is located along U.S. Route 231 approximately 4 mi (6.4 km) south of its intersection with Interstate 10. Via US 231, Cottondale is 7 mi (11 km) north, and Panama City is 44 mi (71 km) south-southwest.

According to the United States Census Bureau, the town has a total area of 1.3 square miles (3.4 km^{2}), of which 1.3 square miles (3.4 km^{2}) is land and 0.04 square miles (0.10 km^{2}) (1.53%) is water.

=== Climate ===
The climate in this area is characterized by hot, humid summers and generally mild winters. According to the Köppen climate classification, the Town of Alford has a humid subtropical climate zone (Cfa).

== Demographics ==
Historical population
Census	Pop.	Note	%±
1920	207		—
1930	221		6.8%
1940	283		28.1%
1950	375		32.5%
1960	380		1.3%
1970	402		5.8%
1980	548		36.3%
1990	472		−13.9%
2000	466		−1.3%
2010	489		4.9%
2020	484		−1.0%
U.S. Decennial Census

=== 2010 and 2020 census ===
Alford racial composition (Hispanics excluded from racial categories) (NH = Non-Hispanic)
Race	Pop 2010	Pop 2020	% 2010	% 2020
White (NH)	447	411	91.41%	84.92%
Black or African American (NH)	10	13	2.04%	2.69%
Native American or Alaska Native (NH)	4	3	0.82%	0.62%
Asian (NH)	4	2	0.82%	0.41%
Pacific Islander or Native Hawaiian (NH)	0	0	0.00%	0.00%
Some other race (NH)	0	1	0.00%	0.21%
Two or more races/Multiracial (NH)	4	27	0.82%	5.58%
Hispanic or Latino (any race)	20	27	4.09%	5.58%
Total	489	484		

As of the 2020 United States census, there were 484 people, 280 households, and 144 families residing in the town. The 2010 United States census recorded 489 people, 169 households, and 117 families residing in the town.

=== 2000 census ===
As of the census of 2000, there were 466 people, 196 households, and 133 families residing in the town. The population density was 140.6/km^{2} (362.9/mi^{2}). There were 235 housing units at an average density of 70.9/km^{2} (183.0/mi^{2}). The racial makeup of the town was 96.35% White, 1.50% African American, 0.86% Native American, 0.21% from other races, and 1.07% from two or more races. Hispanic or Latino of any race were 2.36% of the population.

In 2000, there were 196 households out of which 30.1% had children under the age of 18 living with them, 48.0% were married couples living together, 14.3% had a female householder with no husband present, and 32.1% were non-families. 29.6% of all households were made up of individuals and 15.8% had someone living alone who was 65 years of age or older. The average household size was 2.38 and the average family size was 2.93.

In 2000, in the town, the population was spread out with 27.7% under the age of 18, 5.6% from 18 to 24, 27.0% from 25 to 44, 23.0% from 45 to 64, and 16.7% who were 65 years of age or older. The median age was 37 years. For every 100 females there were 82.0 males. For every 100 females age 18 and over, there were 82.2 males.

In 2000, the median income for a household in the town was $19,250, and the median income for a family was $24,375. Males had a median income of $28,333 versus $16,250 for females. The per capita income for the town was $14,689. About 27.9% of families and 36.9% of the population were below the poverty line, including 52.4% of those under age 18 and 15.5% of those age 65 or over.
