= Campbellton, Florida =

- Town
- Location in Jackson County and the state of Florida
- Coordinates: 30°57′02″N 85°24′09″W
- Country: United States
- State: Florida
- County: Jackson
- Settled: 1840
- Incorporated: 1925

Government
  - Type: Mayor-Council
  - Mayor: Douglas Cotton
  - Councilmembers: Kenneth Fey, Danny Taylor, Conswellor White, and Pamela Williams
  - Town Clerk: Regena Lewis-Harris
  - Town Attorney: John McDaniel

Area
  - Total: 2.68 sq mi (6.93 km^{2})
  - Land: 2.59 sq mi (6.72 km^{2})
  - Water: 0.081 sq mi (0.21 km^{2})
- Elevation: 174 ft (53 m)

Population (2020)
  - Total: 191
  - Density: 73.6/sq mi (28.42/km^{2})
- Time zone: UTC-6 (Central (CST))
  - Summer (DST): UTC-5 (CDT)
- ZIP code: 32426
- Area code(s): 850, 448
- FIPS code: 12-09900
- GNIS feature ID: 2405371

Campbellton is a town in Jackson County, Florida, United States. Part of the Florida Panhandle in North Florida, it has a predominantly African American population. The population was 191 at the 2020 census.

== History ==
Campbellton was established as a community around 1840 or possibly earlier, and may have been named for Judge R.L. Campbell (who resided in Jackson County), or derived from two families who camped in the area.

It was the site of a small skirmish on September 26, 1864, during the waning days of the Civil War. Local Confederate cavalry under the command of Captain Alexander Goodwin unsuccessfully contested the advance of a Federal column led by Brigadier General Alexander Asboth during the preliminary phase of what would become the Battle of Marianna.

The nearby Forks of the Creek Swamp, along the border with Alabama, was a refuge for many Unionist and Confederate deserters during the war. Joseph Sanders, a former Confederate officer who had switched sides and taken a commission as a lieutenant in the Union army, hid out in the swamp for four months during the winter and spring of 1864; he emerged in March of that year to mount an unsuccessful attack on Newton, Alabama, which resulted in the loss of three of his men. Repeated Southern efforts to dislodge the Unionists in the swamp proved unsuccessful.

The Town of Campbellton was officially incorporated as a municipality in 1925, despite being a settlement since at least 1840.

== Geography ==
Campbellton is located in northwestern Jackson County. It sits on a small hill at the junction of U.S. Route 231 and Florida State Road 2. US-231 leads north 19 miles (31 km) to Dothan, Alabama, and south 63 miles (101 km) to Panama City. Marianna, the Jackson County seat, is 17 miles (27 km) to the southeast of Campbellton via US-231 and Florida State Road 73. SR 2 leads east from Campbellton 15 miles (24 km) to Malone and west 6 miles (10 km) to Graceville. SR 273 leads southwest from Campbellton 15 miles (24 km) to Chipley.

According to the United States Census Bureau, Campbellton has a total area of 2.6 square miles (6.7 km^{2}), of which 2.5 square miles (6.5 km^{2}) are land and 0.1 square miles (0.2 km^{2}), or 2.48%, are water.

=== Climate ===
The climate in this area is characterized by hot, humid summers and generally mild winters. According to the Köppen climate classification, the Town of Campbellton has a humid subtropical climate zone (Cfa).

== Demographics ==
Historical population
| Census | Pop. | Note | %± |
|---|---|---|---|
| 1920 | 277 | | — |
| 1930 | 314 | | 13.4% |
| 1940 | 311 | | −1.0% |
| 1950 | 307 | | −1.3% |
| 1960 | 309 | | 0.7% |
| 1970 | 304 | | −1.6% |
| 1980 | 336 | | 10.5% |
| 1990 | 202 | | −39.9% |
| 2000 | 212 | | 5.0% |
| 2010 | 230 | | 8.5% |
| 2020 | 191 | | −17.0% |
U.S. Decennial Census

=== Racial and ethnic composition ===
Campbellton town, Florida – Racial and ethnic composition Note: the US Census treats Hispanic/Latino as an ethnic category. This table excludes Latinos from the racial categories and assigns them to a separate category. Hispanics/Latinos may be of any race.
| Race / Ethnicity (NH = Non-Hispanic) | Pop 2000 | Pop 2010 | Pop 2020 | % 2000 | % 2010 | % 2020 |
|---|---|---|---|---|---|---|
| White alone (NH) | 84 | 77 | 69 | 39.62% | 33.48% | 36.13% |
| Black or African American alone (NH) | 127 | 149 | 106 | 59.91% | 64.78% | 55.50% |
| Native American or Alaska Native alone (NH) | 0 | 0 | 0 | 0.00% | 0.00% | 0.00% |
| Asian alone (NH) | 0 | 1 | 0 | 0.00% | 0.43% | 0.00% |
| Native Hawaiian or Pacific Islander alone (NH) | 0 | 0 | 0 | 0.00% | 0.00% | 0.00% |
| Other race alone (NH) | 0 | 0 | 5 | 0.00% | 0.00% | 2.62% |
| Mixed race or Multiracial (NH) | 0 | 2 | 7 | 0.00% | 0.87% | 3.66% |
| Hispanic or Latino (any race) | 1 | 1 | 4 | 0.47% | 0.43% | 2.09% |
| Total | 212 | 230 | 191 | 100.00% | 100.00% | 100.00% |

=== 2020 census ===
As of the 2020 United States census, there were 191 people, 95 households, and 61 families residing in the town.

=== 2010 census ===
As of the 2010 United States census, there were 230 people, 74 households, and 48 families residing in the town.

=== 2000 census ===
As of the census of 2000, there were 212 people, 90 households, and 65 families residing in the town. The population density was 238.3 inhabitants per square mile (92.0/km^{2}). There were 111 housing units at an average density of 124.8 per square mile (48.2/km^{2}). The racial makeup of the town was 39.62% White, 59.91% African American, 0.47% from other races. Hispanic or Latino of any race were 0.47% of the population.

In 2000, there were 90 households, out of which 27.8% had children under the age of 18 living with them, 48.9% were married couples living together, 22.2% had a female householder with no husband present, and 26.7% were non-families. 26.7% of all households were made up of individuals, and 15.6% had someone living alone who was 65 years of age or older. The average household size was 2.36 and the average family size was 2.83.

In 2000, in the town, the population was spread out, with 23.6% under the age of 18, 4.7% from 18 to 24, 26.4% from 25 to 44, 28.3% from 45 to 64, and 17.0% who were 65 years of age or older. The median age was 41 years. For every 100 females, there were 96.3 males. For every 100 females age 18 and over, there were 80.0 males.

In 2000, the median income for a household in the town was $22,212, and the median income for a family was $26,875. Males had a median income of $31,250 versus $19,792 for females. The per capita income for the town was $12,139. About 20.0% of families and 16.6% of the population were below the poverty line, including 16.9% of those under the age of eighteen and 17.1% of those 65 or over.
