= Cottondale, Florida =

- City
- City of Cottondale
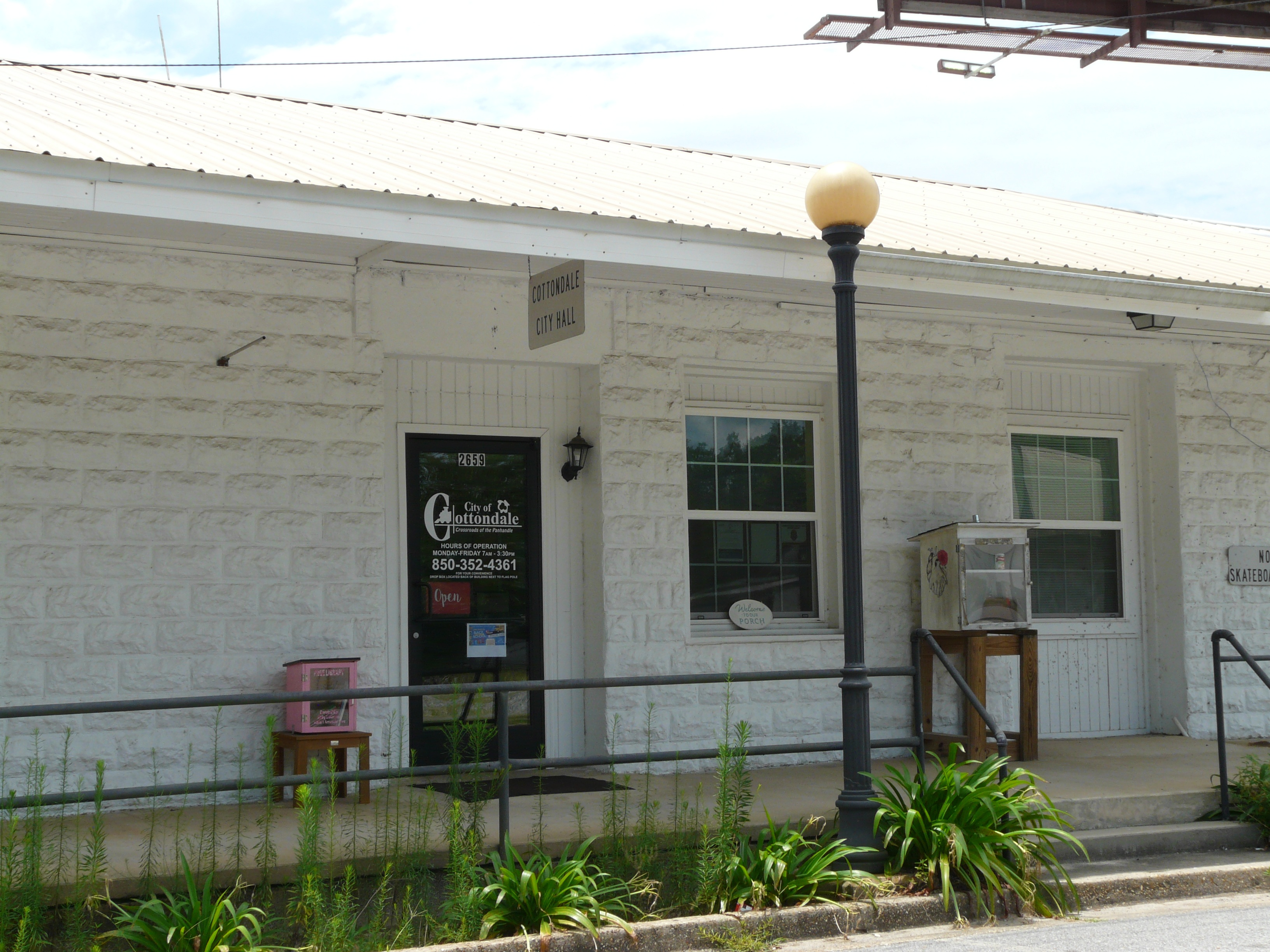
- Cottondale City Hall
- Motto: "Crossroads of the Panhandle"
- Location in Jackson County and the state of Florida
- Coordinates: 30°47′44″N 85°22′28″W
- Country: United States
- State: Florida
- County: Jackson
- Settled: c. 1880-1900
- Incorporated: 1905

Government
  - Type: Mayor–Commission
  - Mayor: James Elmore
  - Mayor Pro Tem: Curtis Bennefield
  - Commissioners: Jerrard Deese, Dennis Sloan, and Ty Daniels
  - City Clerk: Sherri McBride

Area
  - Total: 3.41 sq mi (8.84 km^{2})
  - Land: 3.27 sq mi (8.47 km^{2})
  - Water: 0.14 sq mi (0.37 km^{2})
- Elevation: 154 ft (47 m)

Population (2020)
  - Total: 848
  - Density: 259.4/sq mi (100.16/km^{2})
- Time zone: UTC-6 (Central (CST))
  - Summer (DST): UTC-5 (CDT)
- ZIP code: 32431
- Area code(s): 850, 448
- FIPS code: 12-14850
- GNIS feature ID: 2406319
- Website: www.cityofcottondale.net

Cottondale is a city in Jackson County, Florida, United States. It is part of the Florida Panhandle and North Florida. The population was 848 at the 2020 census, down from 933 at the 2010 census. The City of Cottondale was one of several Florida Panhandle communities devastated by Hurricane Michael in 2018.

== Geography ==
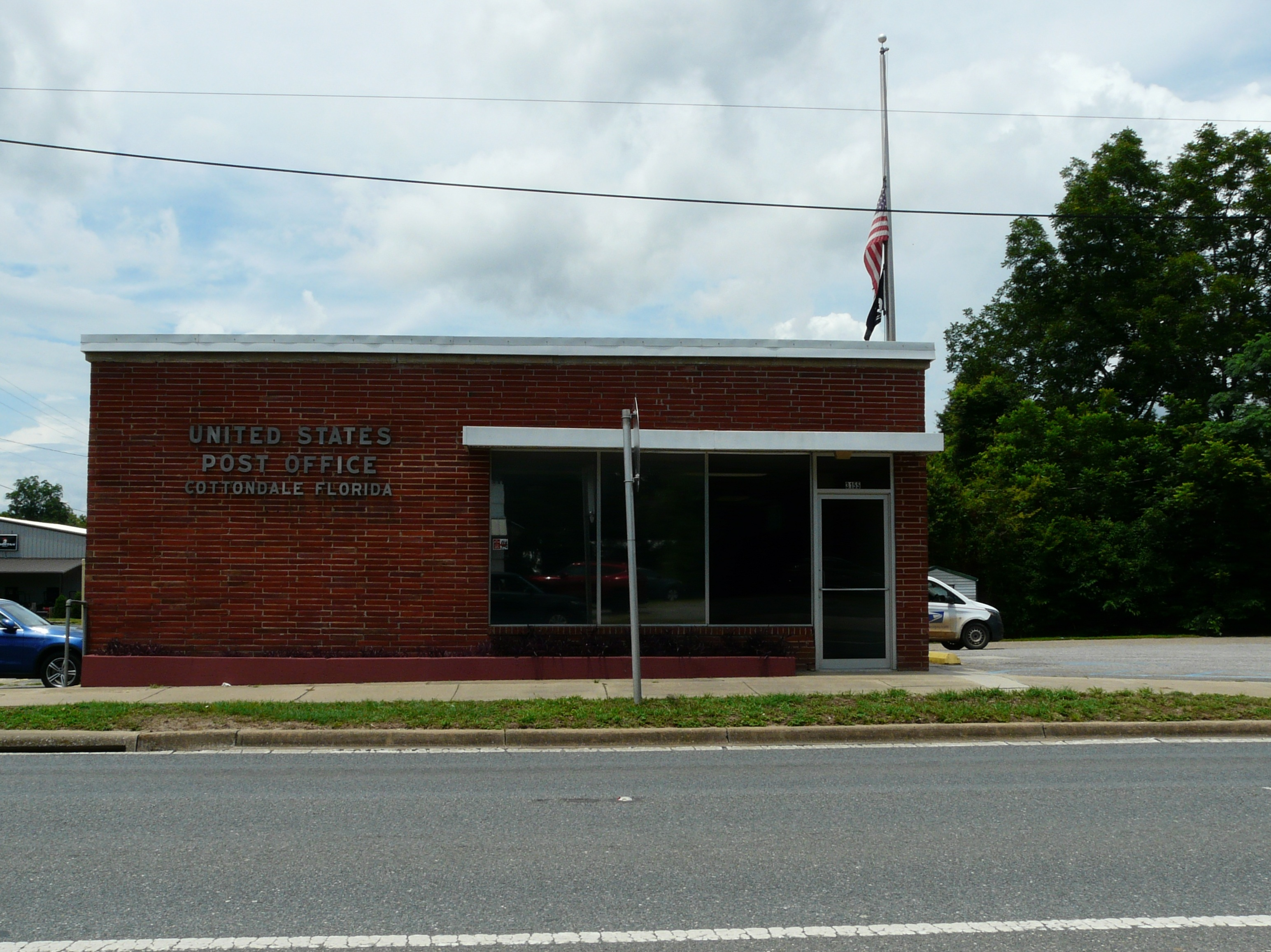
Cottondale U.S. Post Office

The City of Cottondale is located in western Jackson County. U.S. Route 90 passes through the south side of town on Levy Street. US-90 leads east 9 miles (14 km) to Marianna, the Jackson county seat, and west 10 miles (16 km) to Chipley. U.S. Route 231 runs through the center of Cottondale as Main Street, leading north 31 miles (50 km) to Dothan, Alabama, and south 51 miles (82 km) to Panama City. US-231 crosses Interstate 10 3 miles (5 km) south of Cottondale; I-10 leads east 72 miles (116 km) to Tallahassee and west 120 miles (190 km) to Pensacola.

According to the United States Census Bureau, the town has a total area of 3.5 square miles (9.0 km^{2}), of which 3.3 square miles (8.6 km^{2}) are land and 0.1 square miles (0.3 km^{2}), or 3.87%, are water.

=== Climate ===
The climate in this area is characterized by hot, humid summers and generally mild winters. According to the Köppen climate classification, the City of Cottondale has a humid subtropical climate zone (Cfa).

== Demographics ==
Historical population
Census	Pop.	Note	%±
1920	438		—
1930	550		25.6%
1940	719		30.7%
1950	747		3.9%
1960	849		13.7%
1970	765		−9.9%
1980	1,056		38.0%
1990	900		−14.8%
2000	869		−3.4%
2010	933		7.4%
2020	848		−9.1%
U.S. Decennial Census

=== 2010 and 2020 census ===
Cottondale racial composition (Hispanics excluded from racial categories) (NH = Non-Hispanic)
Race	Pop 2010	Pop 2020	% 2010	% 2020
White (NH)	607	551	65.06%	64.98%
Black or African American (NH)	219	167	23.47%	19.69%
Native American or Alaska Native (NH)	4	1	0.43%	0.12%
Asian (NH)	7	3	0.75%	0.35%
Pacific Islander or Native Hawaiian (NH)	0	0	0.00%	0.00%
Some other race (NH)	0	4	0.00%	0.47%
Two or more races/Multiracial (NH)	34	77	3.64%	9.08%
Hispanic or Latino (any race)	62	45	6.65%	5.31%
Total	933	848	100.00%	100.00%

As of the 2020 United States census, there were 848 people, 353 households, and 220 families residing in the city.

As of the 2010 United States census, there were 933 people, 321 households, and 209 families residing in the city.

=== 2000 census ===
As of the census of 2000, there were 869 people, 376 households, and 239 families residing in the city. The population density was 573.2 inhabitants per square mile (221.3/km^{2}). There were 445 housing units at an average density of 293.5 per square mile (113.3/km^{2}). The racial makeup of the town was 76.41% White, 18.64% African American, 0.35% Native American, 0.58% Asian, 0.58% from other races, and 3.45% from two or more races. Hispanic or Latino of any race were 4.14% of the population.

In 2000, there were 376 households, out of which 31.1% had children under the age of 18 living with them, 41.0% were married couples living together, 19.4% had a female householder with no husband present, and 36.2% were non-families. 34.6% of all households were made up of individuals, and 17.3% had someone living alone who was 65 years of age or older. The average household size was 2.31 and the average family size was 2.94.

In 2000, in the city, the population was spread out, with 27.7% under the age of 18, 9.8% from 18 to 24, 24.3% from 25 to 44, 22.8% from 45 to 64, and 15.4% who were 65 years of age or older. The median age was 36 years. For every 100 females, there were 83.7 males. For every 100 females age 18 and over, there were 78.9 males.

In 2000, the median income for a household in the town was $20,509, and the median income for a family was $26,667. Males had a median income of $24,545 versus $18,571 for females. The per capita income for the town was $11,266. About 24.8% of families and 27.4% of the population were below the poverty line, including 34.3% of those under age 18 and 23.6% of those age 65 or over.

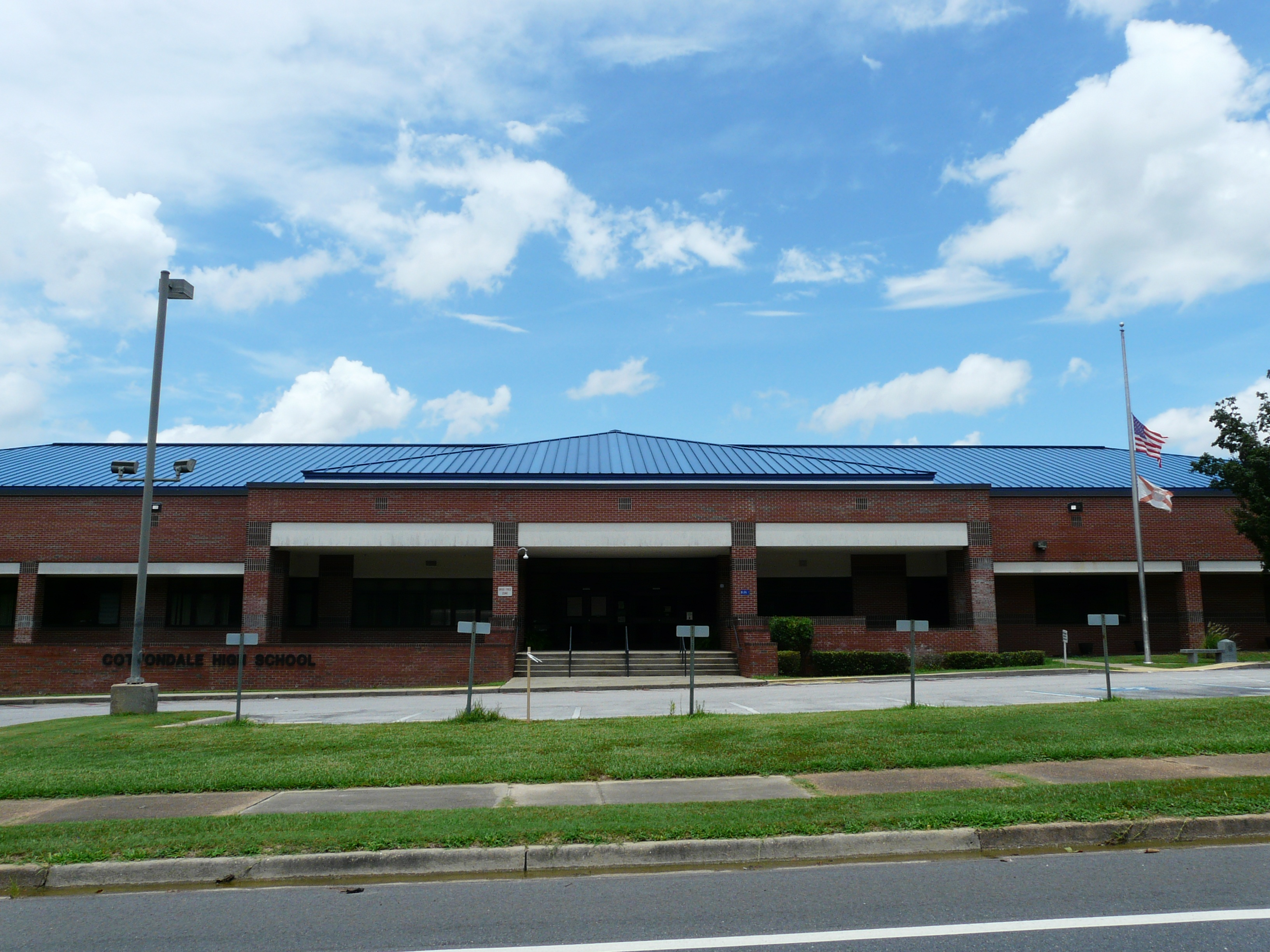
Cottondale High School

== Education ==
The public schools located within Cottondale are Cottondale Elementary School and Cottondale High School. These schools are a part of the Jackson County School District.
