= Graceville, Florida =

- City
- City of Graceville
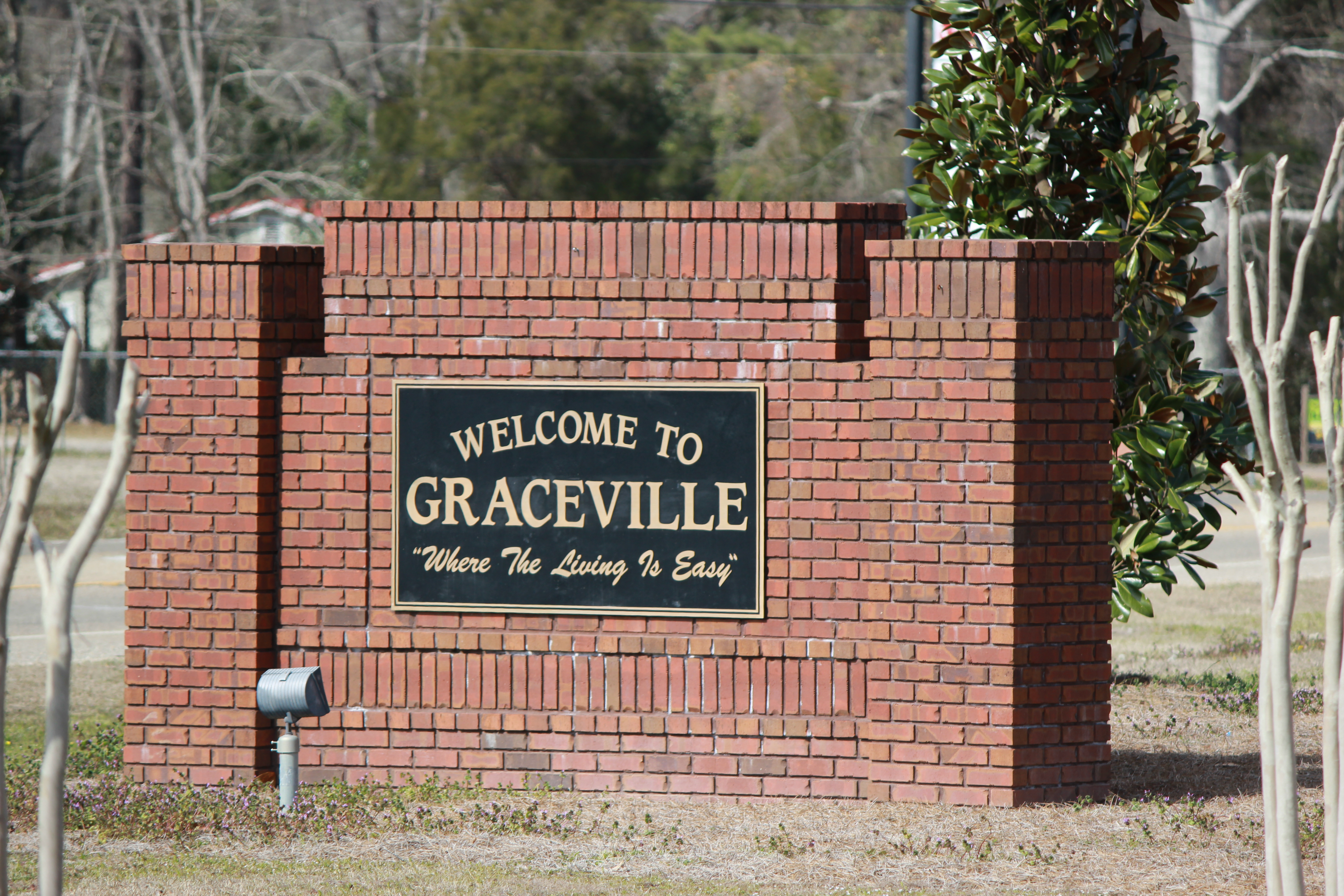
- "Welcome to Graceville" sign located on SR 77
- Motto: "Where The Living Is Easy"
- Location in Jackson County, Holmes County and the state of Florida
- Coordinates: 30°57′42″N 85°30′18″W
- Country: United States
- State: Florida
- County: Jackson
- Settled: 1824
- Incorporated: 1902

Government
  - Type: Commission–Manager
  - Mayor: Arthur P.W. Obar, Jr.
  - Mayor Pro Tem: Walter Olds
  - Commissioners: Curtis Pinkard, Marshall Davis, and John McClendon
  - City Manager: Michelle C. Watkins
  - City Clerk: Misty Smith

Area
  - Total: 4.44 sq mi (11.49 km^{2})
  - Land: 4.33 sq mi (11.21 km^{2})
  - Water: 0.11 sq mi (0.28 km^{2})
- Elevation: 151 ft (46 m)

Population (2020)
  - Total: 2,153
  - Density: 497.4/sq mi (192.05/km^{2})
- Time zone: UTC-6 (Central (CST))
  - Summer (DST): UTC-5 (CDT)
- ZIP code: 32440
- Area code(s): 850, 448
- FIPS code: 12-27000
- GNIS feature ID: 2403719
- Website: www.cityofgraceville.com

Graceville is a city in Jackson County, Florida, United States. It is near the Alabama state line. The population was 2,153 at the 2020 census.

== Geography ==
Florida State Road 2 and Florida State Road 77 are the two main highways through the city. FL SR 2 runs from west to east through the center of town, leading east 7 mi (11 km) to Campbellton and west 10 mi (16 km) to Esto. FL SR 77 runs from south to north through the center of town, leading northeast 22 mi (35 km) to Dothan, Alabama via a connection with Alabama State Route 109, and south 12 mi (19 km) to Chipley.

Jackson County is a rural community primarily composed of business in agriculture, manufacturing, service, and retail trade. In addition, many government facilities are located within the county, including a federal prison and three state correctional institutions. Elevation ranges from 50 to 330 feet (100 m) above sea level. Marianna is 185 feet (56 m) above sea level.

Soil composition ranges from sandy to clay base. The most typical soil is sandy loam. Jackson County has a vast deposit of nearly pure limestone. The county abounds in lakes including Lake Seminole, Compass Lake, Merritt's Mill Pond and Ocheessee Pond. The Chattahoochee River-Apalachicola River, which is navigable and has a nine-foot channel depth, forms the county's eastern border. The Chipola River flows south through the center of the county.

=== Climate ===
The climate in this area is characterized by hot, humid summers and generally mild winters. According to the Köppen climate classification, the City of Graceville has a humid subtropical climate zone (Cfa).

- Land area: 916 sq mi (2,370 km^{2}).
- Region of the country: Southeast
- Average temperature: 67.2 °F
- Average high temperature: 79.0 °F
- Average low temperature: 55.0 °F
- Annual rain: 66.0 inches
- Annual snowfall: 0.0 inches
- Earthquake index: 0.0

== Demographics ==
Historical population
Census	Pop.	Note	%±
1910	734		—
1920	840		14.4%
1930	1,012		20.5%
1940	1,181		16.7%
1950	1,638		38.7%
1960	2,307		40.8%
1970	2,560		11.0%
1980	2,918		14.0%
1990	2,675		−8.3%
2000	2,402		−10.2%
2010	2,278		−5.2%
2020	2,153		−5.5%
U.S. Decennial Census

=== Racial and ethnic composition ===
Graceville racial composition (Hispanics excluded from racial categories) (NH = Non-Hispanic)
Race	Pop 2010	Pop 2020	% 2010	% 2020
White (NH)	1,572	1,370	69.01%	63.63%
Black or African American (NH)	551	582	24.19%	27.03%
Native American or Alaska Native (NH)	7	7	0.31%	0.33%
Asian (NH)	4	9	0.18%	0.42%
Pacific Islander or Native Hawaiian (NH)	3	0	0.13%	0.00%
Some other race (NH)	0	9	0.00%	0.42%
Two or more races/Multiracial (NH)	46	85	2.02%	3.95%
Hispanic or Latino (any race)	95	91	4.17%	4.23%
Total	2,278	2,153		

=== 2020 census ===
As of the 2020 census, Graceville had a population of 2,153. The median age was 42.9 years. 22.1% of residents were under the age of 18 and 23.4% of residents were 65 years of age or older. For every 100 females there were 87.1 males, and for every 100 females age 18 and over there were 81.0 males age 18 and over.

0.0% of residents lived in urban areas, while 100.0% lived in rural areas.

There were 865 households in Graceville, of which 32.4% had children under the age of 18 living in them. Of all households, 33.1% were married-couple households, 20.7% were households with a male householder and no spouse or partner present, and 40.1% were households with a female householder and no spouse or partner present. About 33.4% of all households were made up of individuals and 14.6% had someone living alone who was 65 years of age or older.

There were 995 housing units, of which 13.1% were vacant. The homeowner vacancy rate was 4.2% and the rental vacancy rate was 7.2%.

In the 2020 American Community Survey 5-year estimates, there were 451 families residing in the city.

=== 2010 census ===
As of the 2010 United States census, there were 2,278 people, 1,012 households, and 530 families residing in the city.

=== 2000 census ===
As of the census of 2000, there were 2,402 people, 933 households, and 572 families residing in the city. The population density was 559.0 inhabitants per square mile (215.8/km^{2}). There were 1,076 housing units at an average density of 250.4 per square mile (96.7/km^{2}). The racial makeup of the city was 73.48% White, 23.90% African American, 0.92% Native American, 0.17% Asian, 0.25% from other races, and 1.29% from two or more races. Hispanic or Latino of any race were 1.46% of the population.

In 2000, there were 933 households, out of which 26.8% had children under the age of 18 living with them, 44.3% were married couples living together, 13.8% had a female householder with no husband present, and 38.6% were non-families. 33.9% of all households were made up of individuals, and 17.3% had someone living alone who was 65 years of age or older. The average household size was 2.35 and the average family size was 3.08.

In 2000, in the city, the population was spread out, with 23.4% under the age of 18, 13.3% from 18 to 24, 23.1% from 25 to 44, 19.7% from 45 to 64, and 20.6% who were 65 years of age or older. The median age was 37 years. For every 100 females, there were 84.3 males. For every 100 females age 18 and over, there were 80.0 males.

In 2000, the median income for a household in the city was $23,031, and the median income for a family was $32,778. Males had a median income of $25,969 versus $20,109 for females. The per capita income for the city was $14,245. About 15.1% of families and 20.7% of the population were below the poverty line, including 25.0% of those under age 18 and 18.9% of those age 65 or over.

== Education ==
The Jackson County School Board operates all public schools.

- Graceville Elementary School
- Graceville High School
- Poplar Springs High School
- Baptist University of Florida

== Transportation ==
Graceville was served by the Louisville and Nashville Railroad at the end of the stub Georgiana Branch which reached the town on July 16, 1902, and, later, by the Seaboard System from 1983, and then by the Alabama and Florida Railroad, when the line was spun off as a shortline. The line was freight-only, the last L&N passenger local having come off circa late 1950. Train 27 departed Georgiana, Alabama, at 7:15 a.m., arriving at Graceville at 10:40 a.m. Returning train 28 departed Graceville at 11:05 a.m. and arrived at Georgiana at 2:35 p.m. Following World War II, with the improvement of local roads and the availability of private vehicles, the railroad petitioned the Alabama Public Service Commission to discontinue daily except Sunday trains between Georgiana and Graceville on November 6, 1947. "Passenger travel on trains 27 and 28 is now, and has been for several years, at a very low ebb, there being times when the train crew exceeds the number of passengers on the train," explained the railroad company in court documents dated October 31, 1950, appealing the commission's refusal to allow discontinuance. The operating deficit averaged ~$188 per day.

The A&F abandoned the line between Geneva and Graceville on January 16, 1984. The Atlanta and St. Andrews Bay Railroad also built a seven-mile connection into town from the east from their Dothan-Panama City mainline at Campbellton, completed July 14, 1971, but this, too, was abandoned by 1996 after the possible bridge traffic from the A&F disappeared. The "Bay Line" would buy the small yard and wye in town from the A&F. Only a few rails embedded in former town grade crossings mark the abandoned right of ways.

== Notable people ==
- Neal Anderson, former professional NFL football player
- Grady W. Courtney, member of the Florida House of Representatives
- John Wayne Mixson, former Lieutenant Governor of Florida, and former Governor of Florida
- Ricky Polston, Chief Justice of the Florida Supreme Court
- Bob Snyder, musician
- Colston Weatherington, former professional NFL football player
