= Florida State Road 1 =

State Road 1 may refer to:

- Florida State Road A1A, known as SR 1 in 1945-1946
- Florida State Road 1 (pre-1945), now mostly US 90 (SR 10)
- U.S. Route 1 in Florida
