= Museum of Local History =

Museum of Local History may refer to:

== United States ==
- Museum of Local History - Fremont, California
- Museum of Local History - Milton, Florida
