= Ely-Criglar House =

Historic house in Florida, United States

- U.S. National Register of Historic Places
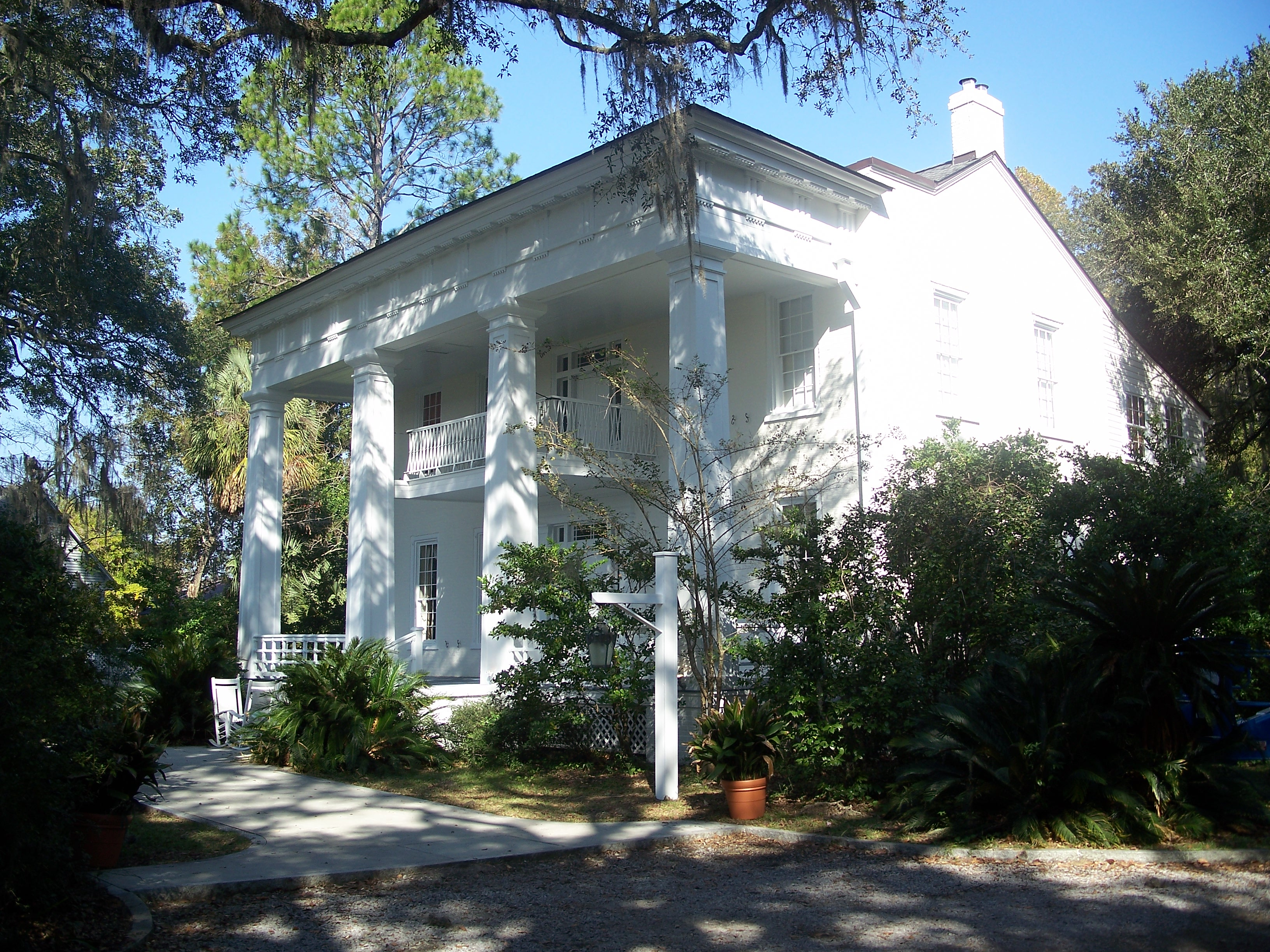

- Location within Florida Location within the United States
- Location: Marianna, Florida
- Coordinates: 30°46′34″N 85°14′5″W
- Architectural style: Greek Revival
- NRHP reference No.: 72000326
- Added to NRHP: December 27, 1972

The Ely-Criglar House (also known as the Francis R. Ely House) is a historic site in Marianna, Florida. It is located at 242 West Lafayette Street. On December 27, 1972, it was added to the U.S. National Register of Historic Places. Built by slaves from native limestone, the Greek Revival structure was completed c. 1840, as the Manor House for Francis R. Ely's 1,629-acre (659 ha) cotton plantation. "Ely Corner" is the site of The Battle of Marianna, where Federal troops attacked in September 1864 during the American Civil War. Defending the town against the enemy were old men and boys, too old or too young for regular military service and those furloughed or home due to illness.

The Battle of Marianna began at a barricade erected by the old men and boys at Ely's Corner, the southwest corner of the property, at the junction of St. Andrews Bay Road and Campbellton Road.
