= Crestview Commercial Historic District =

Historic district in Florida, United States

- U.S. National Register of Historic Places
- U.S. Historic district
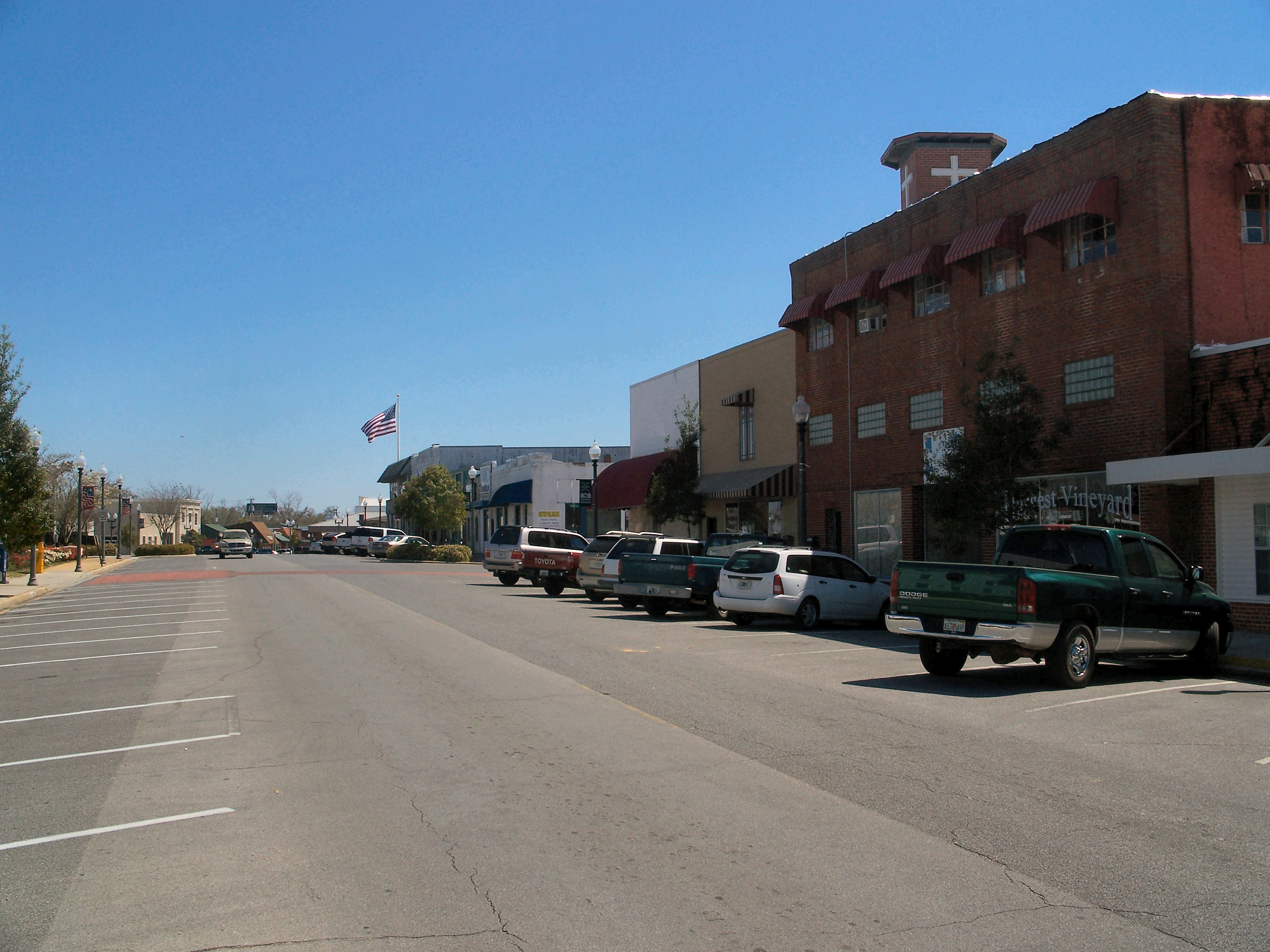
- Main street, the center of the district

- Location within Florida Location within the United States
- Location: Crestview, Florida
- Coordinates: 30°45′33″N 86°34′15″W
- Area: 18.1 acres (73,000 m^{2})
- Architectural style: Moderne, Classical Revival
- NRHP reference No.: 06000620
- Added to NRHP: July 20, 2006

The Crestview Commercial Historic District is a U.S. historic district in Crestview, Florida. It is roughly bounded by Industrial Drive, North Ferdon Boulevard, North Wilson Street, and James Lee Boulevard. On July 20, 2006, it was added to the U.S. National Register of Historic Places.

== Gallery ==
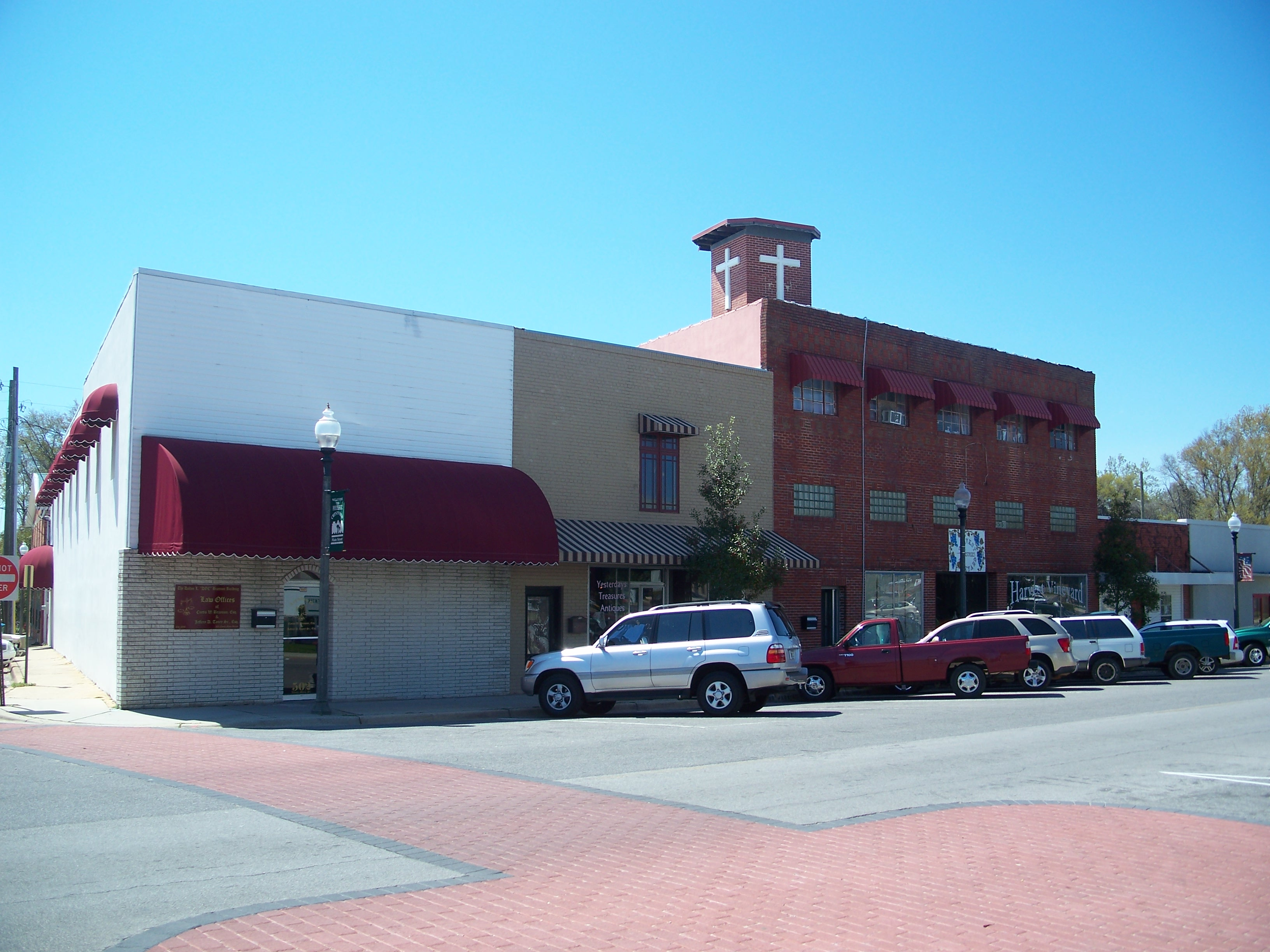

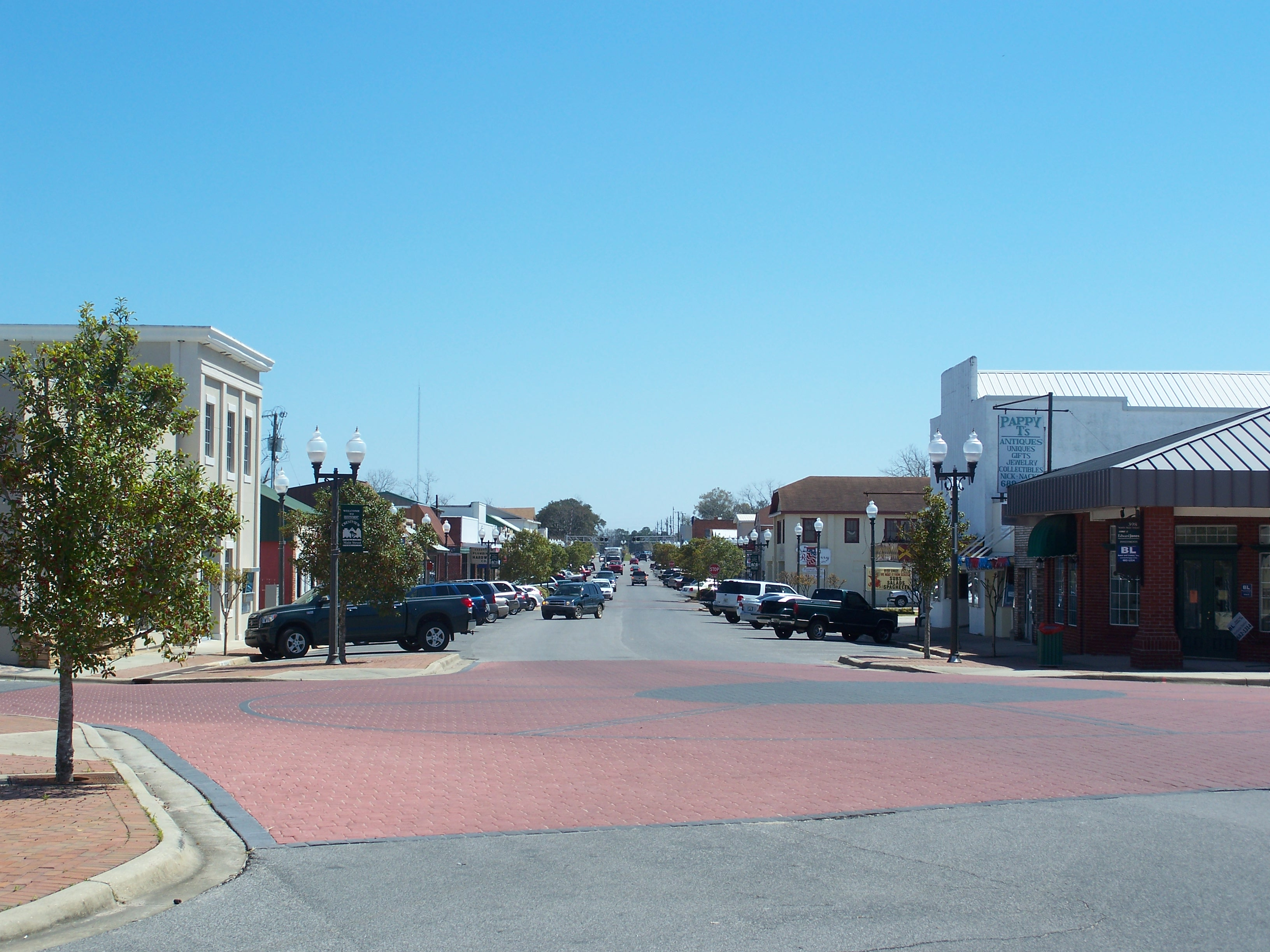

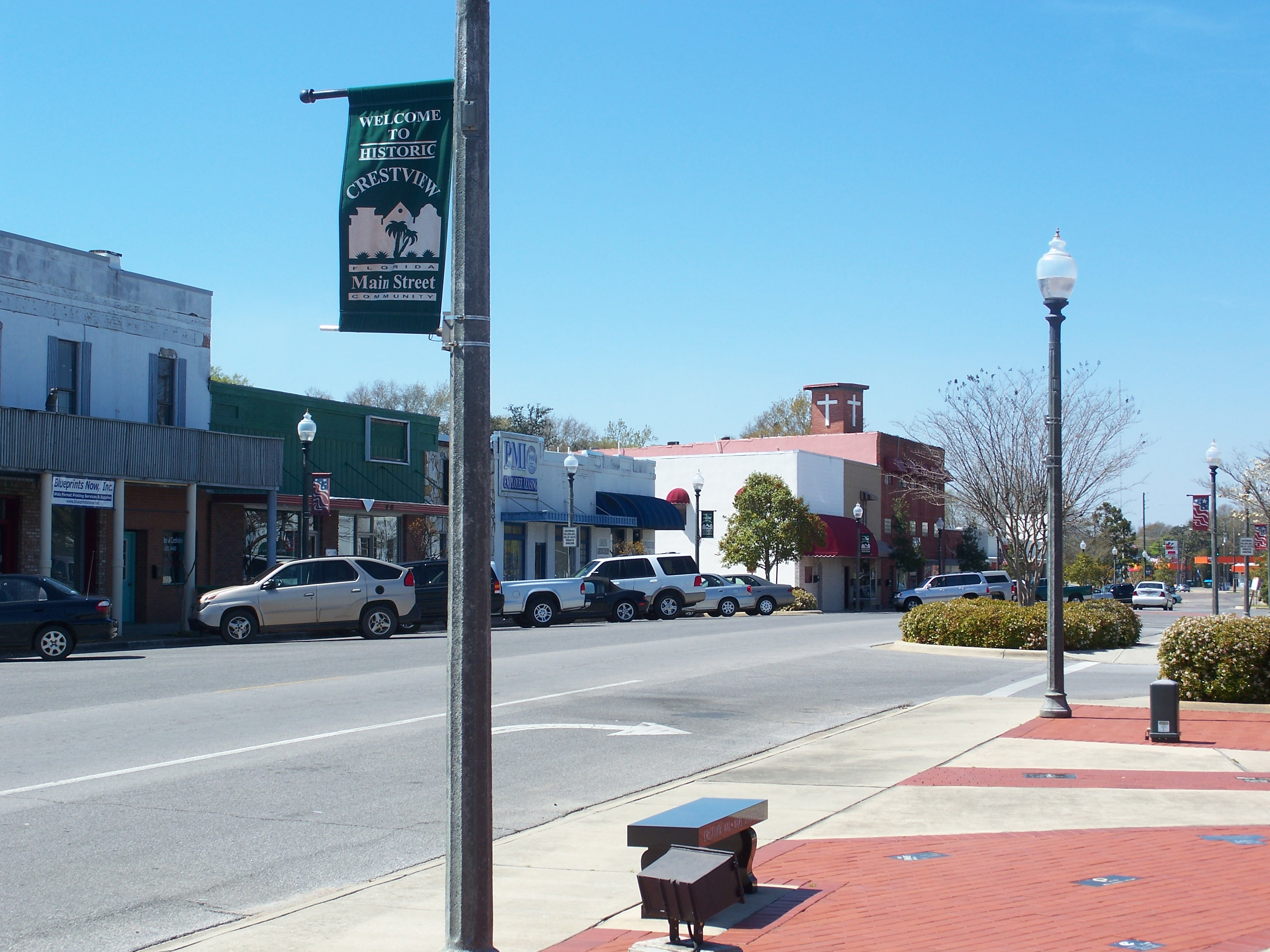
