= Hyer-Knowles Planing Mill Chimney =

- U.S. National Register of Historic Places
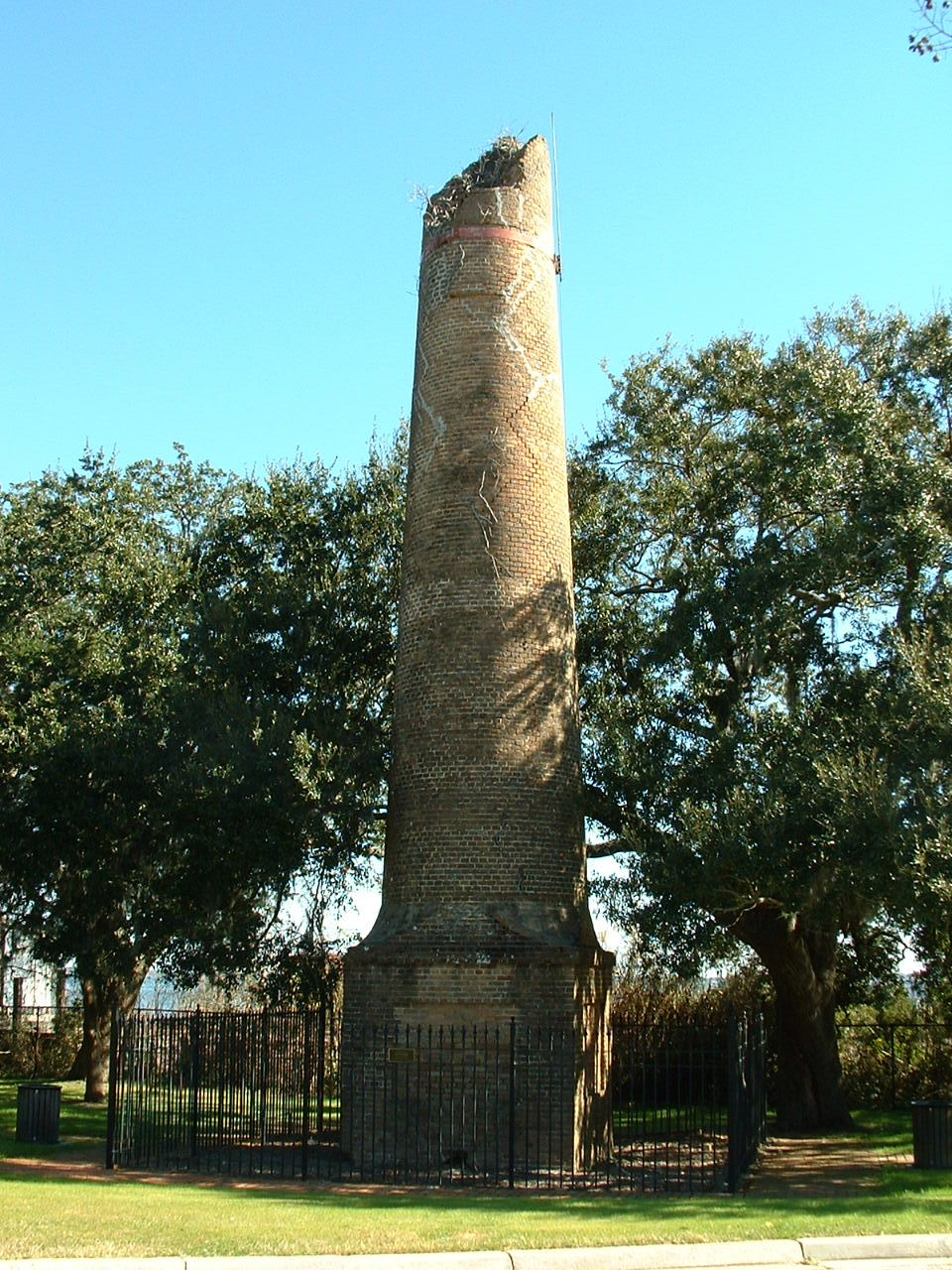
- The Chimney at a wayside park on Pensacola Bluffs Scenic Highway near Langley Avenue.

- Location within Florida Location within the United States
- Location: Pensacola, Florida
- Coordinates: 30.48064°N 87.16251°W
- Built: 1854
- NRHP reference No.: 12000299
- Added to NRHP: May 24, 2012

The Hyer—Knowles Planing Mill Chimney in Pensacola, Florida is all that remains of an 1854 steam-powered sawmill. When the Confederacy abandoned the city in 1862, all the mills were destroyed so they could not be used by the Union. The only part of the building that survived was the chimney. It is now part of Chimney Park, a wayside park along US 90. The chimney was added to the National Register of Historic Places on May 24, 2012.
