= Victory Bridge (Florida) =

Bridge in the Florida Panhandle, United States

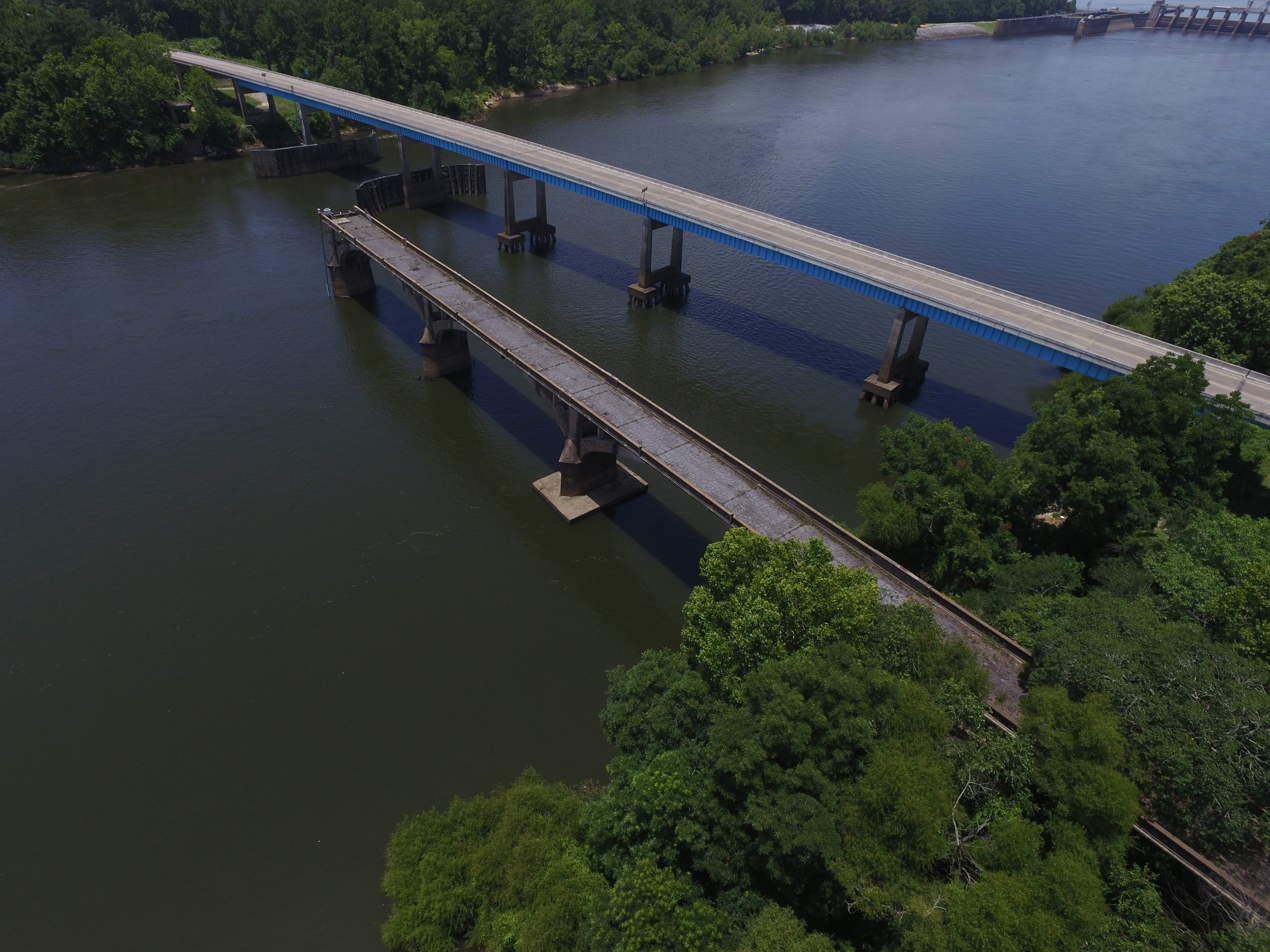
- Victory Bridge spanning the Apalachicola River via US 90
- Coordinates: 30.701134°N 84.85908°W
- Carries: Motor vehicles
- Crosses: Apalachicola River
- Locale: Florida Panhandle
- Owner: Florida Department of Transportation, District 3
- ID number: 530951

Characteristics
- Material: Concrete, steel
- Total length: 1,636 feet (499 m)
- Width: 35 feet (11 m)
- Longest span: 154 feet (47 m)
- No. of spans: 6
- Piers in water: 6
- Load limit: 87.8 short tons (79.7 t)
- No. of lanes: 2

History
- Constructed by: GLF Construction Corporation
- Built: 1959
- Construction end: 1996

Statistics
- Daily traffic: 6500 (2019)

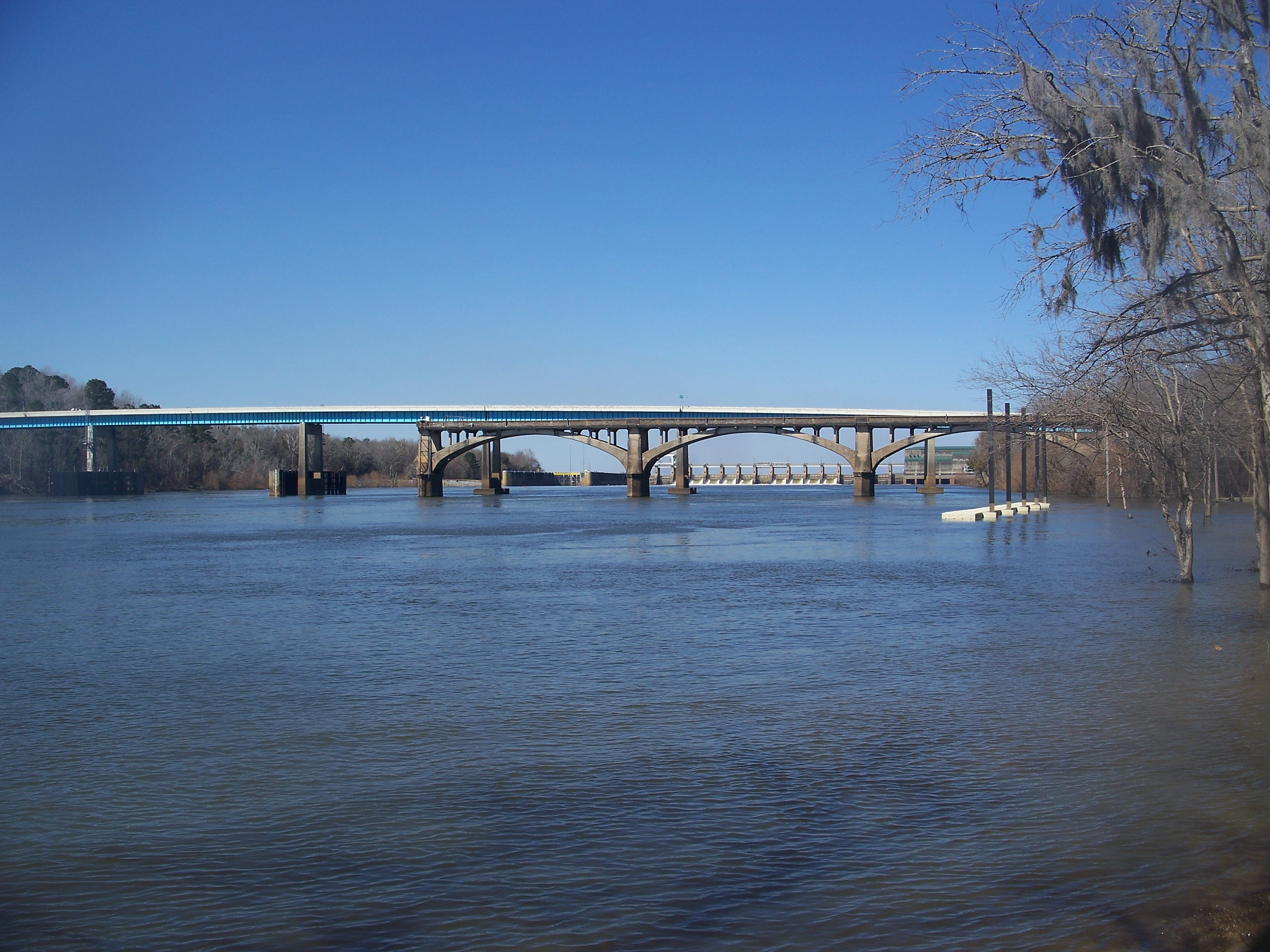
Old and new Victory Bridges, with Jim Woodruff Dam in the background

The Victory Bridge carries U.S. Route 90 (US 90) over the floodplain of the Apalachicola River in the Florida Panhandle, immediately below the Jim Woodruff Dam. It was originally built by the Masters and Mullen Construction Company out of Cleveland (Henry C. Masters and Claude F. Mullen). The original Victory Bridge, completed in 1922 at a cost of $1 million USD, is no longer used, having been replaced first in 1958 and again in 1994-1996 by a high-level bridge slightly upstream that carries the same name. It is also a Time zone border

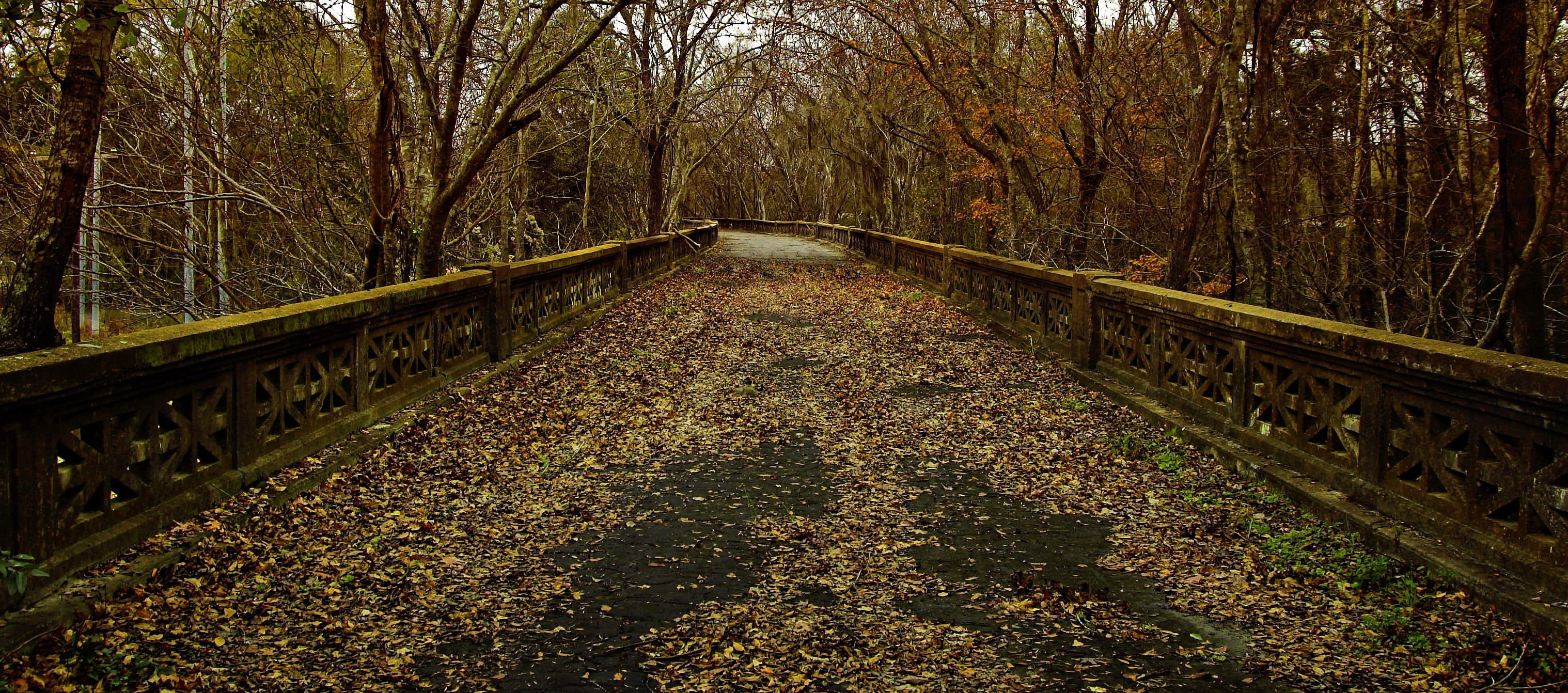
The old Victory Bridge.

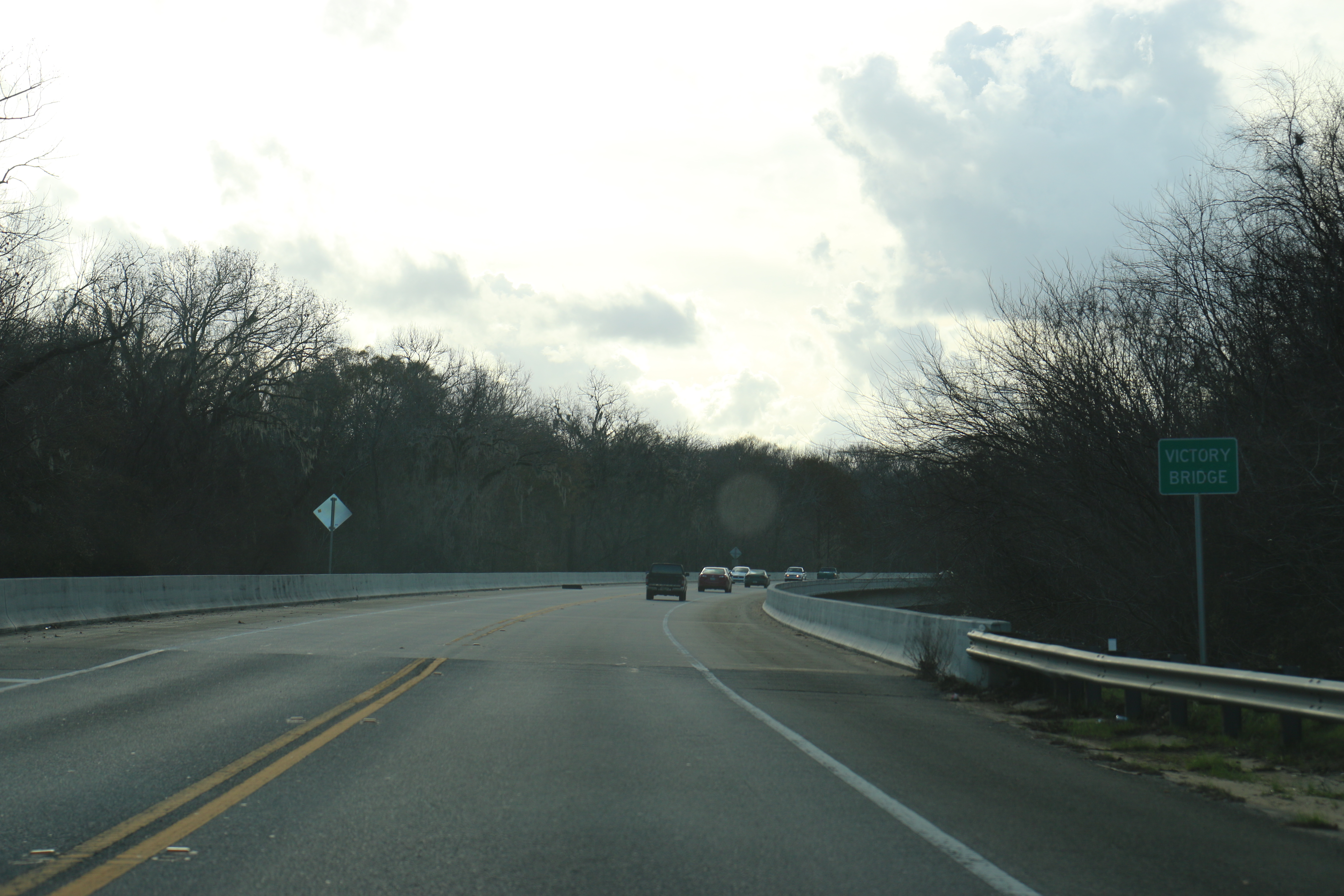
Center line on U.S. Route 90.
