= U.S. Route 90 in Florida =

U.S. Highway 90

Route information
- Maintained by FDOT
- Length: 408.723 mi (657.776 km)
- Existed: 1926–present

Major junctions
- West end: US 90 near Seminole, AL
- US 29 in Pensacola; I-110 in Pensacola; US 27 in Tallahassee; US 19 in Monticello; I-75 in Lake City; US 41 in Lake City; US 441 in Lake City; I-10 near Sanderson; US 301 in Baldwin; I-95 in Jacksonville; US 1 in Jacksonville; I-295 in Jacksonville
- East end: SR A1A in Jacksonville Beach

Location
- Country: United States
- State: Florida
- Counties: Escambia, Santa Rosa, Okaloosa, Walton, Holmes, Washington, Jackson, Gadsden, Leon, Jefferson, Madison, Suwannee, Columbia, Baker, Nassau, Duval

Highway system
- United States Numbered Highway System; List; Special; Divided; Florida State Highway System; Interstate; US; State; Former; Pre‑1945; Toll; Scenic
← SR 89	→ SR 90
← SR 10	SR 10A	→ SR 11

U.S. Route 90 (US 90) in the state of Florida is the northernmost east–west United States Numbered Highway in the state and runs parallel with Interstate 10. US 90 not only passes through the county seats of 15 of the 16 counties it runs through on its course in Florida (the exception is Nassau County) and is also the road upon which many of the county courthouses are located, but it was the first paved road in Florida (from Jacksonville westward a few miles). It is never more than six miles (9.7 km) from Interstate 10 (I-10) throughout the state, except to the east of Jacksonville. It runs as a two-lane highway through most of the sparsely populated inland areas of the Florida Panhandle, widening to four lanes through and near several towns. The speed limit is 55 mph (89 km/h) for all rural points west of Monticello, and it is 60 mph (97 km/h) on all rural points from where it enters Madison County as far as Glen St. Mary.

Like all highways in Florida, US 90 always carries a state road number, which may or may not always be signed. These numbers are assigned by the Florida Department of Transportation (FDOT):

- State Road 10 (SR 10) from the Alabama state line to US 90 Alt./SR 10 east in Jacksonville with one exception:
  - SR 10A between the western and eastern termini of US 90 Alt. in Escambia County, which carries SR 10.
- SR 212 from the US 90 Alt./SR 10 interchange in Jacksonville to the eastern terminus at SR A1A in Jacksonville Beach.

Concurrencies include US 98 in Pensacola, US 331 in DeFuniak Springs, US 221 in Greenville, US 301 in Baldwin, and US 1 in Jacksonville. Lesser concurrencies with state and county roads also exist in various parts of the state. The segment between US 319 in Tallahassee and US 441 in Lake City also includes part of the DeSoto Trail.

== Route description ==
=== Escambia County, including Pensacola ===
As it enters the Sunshine State from Alabama after crossing a bridge over the Perdido River, US 90 and the eastbound beginning of unsigned SR 10 passes by two roads for a local fish camp on the northeast side of the bridge then bends northeast toward the rural community of Beulah. This segment of the road is known as Mobile Highway. Halfway along this alignment a single truck weigh station that's accessible from both directions can be found on the south side of the road. Once it begins to turn more to the east again, US 90 becomes a divided highway before it shifts south towards Pensacola while US 90 Alternate (US 90 Alt.) stays to the north of the city taking SR 10. This stretch of highway is also known as Nine Mile Road. US 90 itself moves onto hidden SR 10A where it narrows back down to two lanes and then takes a turn to the southeast, still keeping Mobile Highway as the street name. From there, the road becomes the southern terminus of County Road 99 (CR 99), the westernmost two-digit route in Florida.

After passing by the Florida Division of Forestry's Beulah Fire Lookout Tower, and then a few schools and churches, the road crosses waterways such as Elevenmile Creek and then Eightmile Creek before entering Bellview. Here, the first major intersection is CR 173, better known as Blue Angel Parkway, and a county extension of SR 173. Next, it turns into a four-lane divided highway north of Godwin Lane, and then becomes the southern terminus of SR 297. The only other intersection south of this point is Bellview Avenue between there and a much more important intersection with the western terminus of SR 296 and eastern terminus of CR 296. From there, open space exists on the southwest side of the street which is interrupted only by one street, specifically CR 341 (Marlane Drive). The road then crosses a body of water known as Bayou Marcus Creek which leads to Crescent Lake, the southwest corner of which is flanked by the Osceola Municipal Golf Course. The road runs along the border of West Pensacola and Myrtle Grove until it reaches the intersection with SR 727 (Fairfield Drive) and is entirely within West Pensacola. Eastbound SR 727 provides the only northbound access to the next state route, because that route happens to contain a partial cloverleaf interchange with SR 295, which includes only east-to-south and west-to-north access from US 90, and south-to-east and north-to-west access from SR 295. Later it serves as the northern terminus of SR 295 Spur and eastern terminus of SR 298 (New Warrington Road). The road then approaches a bridge over some railroad tracks and then begins to turn more towards the east and less towards the south.

US 90 finally enters the city of Pensacola after the intersection of CR 453 (W Street) where it merges onto West Cervantes Street, which is also the name of a local street west of CR 453. Eight blocks later, US 90 encounters the intersection of US 98 and SR 292, and US 98 moves from a concurrency with SR 292 to one with US 90. Together US 90 & 98 run through the heart of Pensacola. Among the intersections they share are with US 29 where West Cervantes Street becomes East Cervantes Street. But US 29 has been overshadowed by a partial interchange with I-110 at exit 2. Two to three blocks later it encounters southbound SR 291 along Dr. Martin Luther King Jr. Drive (formerly Alcaniz Street), and northbound SR 291 along Davis Highway). Four blocks later, the US 90/98 concurrency ends at the intersection with SR 289, where US 98 turns south towards the Pensacola Bay Bridge and runs along the coast of the Gulf of Mexico toward Perry, Lakeland, and Palm Beach, while US 90 continues along Cervantes Street. Veering slightly to the right after the intersection with 15th Street, it crosses a bridge over Bayou Texar, and hits land again at the intersection of Bayou Boulevard across from the Bayou Texar Boat Ramp, which can only be accessed from Stanley Avenue a block east.

==== Pensacola Scenic Bluffs Highway ====
After the eastern terminus of SR 296 at Perry Avenue, the name of the road changes to "Scenic Highway," becoming an official Florida Scenic Highway known as the Pensacola Scenic Bluffs Highway. It narrows down from four lanes to two lanes between Chipley Avenue and Strong Street, and it turns north where it runs along the west side of Escambia Bay. Along the way, it frequently encounters the CSX P&A Subdivision, a former Louisville and Nashville Railroad line that carried Amtrak's Sunset Limited from 1993 until 2005 when Hurricane Katrina truncated the line to New Orleans. The road moves closer to the tracks near Magnolia Point just south of Hyde Park Road. Most of the area along this segment is residential, and those that aren't normally tend to consist of either parkland or merely open space.

Despite having neither a state or county road designation, the intersection of Summit Boulevard is of importance because it leads to Pensacola International Airport. After another random series of local streets, residences and parks, US 90 approaches a signaled intersection with Langley Avenue, which is across the street from a wayside for Chimney Park along Red Bluff, the site of the former Hyer-Knowles Planing Mill, which was destroyed by Confederate General Braxton Bragg as part of an attempt to prevent the factory from falling into Union hands. This site has been part of the National Register of Historic Places since May 2012. Just west of a peninsula called Gulf Point, the last state highway US 90 encounters in the city is SR 742. From there it enters Ferry Pass, where it will remain through the rest of the county. US 90 then encounters the first of five interchanges with I-10 at exit 17 (which is a folded diamond interchange), just before I-10 crosses the Escambia Bay Bridge. Later, the P&A Subdivision branches off to the east at Lora Point in order to cross its own bridge across the bay while US 90 moves to the northwest along the coast of Macky Bay. The first intersection along this segment also happens to be the first major intersection, SR 290 (Olive Road). All other streets along this segment are local ones, and all on the west side of the road. However, when the coastline moves to the north it provides local streets on the east side. Once this happens, the route finally encounters the eastern terminus of US 90 Alt. where the scenic route officially ends, and it becomes a four-lane divided highway again before crossing some bridges along the swamps on the left side of the bay the first of which is for the Escambia River where it crosses the Escambia–Santa Rosa county line.

=== Santa Rosa County ===
Not yet outside of the Pensacola metropolitan area, US 90 enters Pace and gains the name Caroline Street. After the intersection of CR 197A, the road turns northeast, where it crosses CR 197 (Chumukula Highway), and at County Road 197B (West Spencer Field Road) it turns east again. The road remains straight east and west as it encounters another segment of CR 197A. After the northern terminus with SR 281 the road curves northeast, and officially enters Milton. It then crosses a pair of bridges over Pond Creek, where it passes by Mayo Park. Just east of the intersection with Glover Lane, Old US 90, a former segment of US 90 veers off to the right, but it is only a local street. The rest of the area is surrounded by portions of city territory, which becomes more widespread as it approaches the southern terminus of SR 89 (Dogwood Drive), but also has a hidden concurrency with SR 89 east of there. A far more visible concurrency exists later on when the road curves back to the east where it meets the intersection with SR 87, the eastern corners of which also includes the intersection of the Blackwater Heritage State Trail. From this point on the road narrows down to two lanes as it runs through the Milton Historic District, an area that has been on the National Register of Historic Places since November 12, 1987 and also includes an intersection with CR 191, which contains the east end of Old US 90. The district ends as the road crosses a bridge over the Blackwater River, and leaves the city limits.

As the road enters East Milton and the Marquis Bayou, US 90/SR 87 encounters the entrance to Russell Barker Landing Park, and across from that the historic former section of US 90 known as State Road 1 (see below), which is listed on the National Register of Historic Places. Later the road runs through the rural outskirts of Milton which includes another park known as Locklin Field Park, and then curves to the southeast. The old road is encountered again under a bridge over the CSX P&A Subdivision, and after becoming the northern terminus of CR 89 thus eliminating the hidden SR 89 concurrency, it then runs parallel to the old road as well as the P&A Subdivision on the north side. All three roads (US 90/SR 78, Old SR 1, and the P&A line) run relatively straight northeast to southwest from that point on. Right after Peter Prince Field, the concurrency with SR 87 ends as that route turns south toward Navarre Beach, while the other routes continue in the same direction, with only random local intersections. A street which would seem to be a former segment of US 90, but isn't known as Goodrange Drive veers off to the southeast in Harold, while US 90 turns at a more northeasterly angle where it encounters Deaton Bridge Road which leads to Blackwater River State Park after passing by the Harold Nolf Heliport. On the opposite of this is one leg of the wye to Miller Bluff Road. Goodrange Drive merges back with US 90, which remains at the same trajectory. From there, the road runs along a mostly dirt road called "Bliss Way." Both road run under a power line right-of-way, then pass by the George T. McCutchan Airport (a local airstrip) before it later encounters the no longer existent community of Floridale, briefly moving away from the tracks, and then returning to tracks before cutting through the southeast corner of Blackwater River State Forest. Upon leaving the forest, it runs near an animal feed store and horse farm which is the last business to be found in the county. The last intersection in the county is Lake Yellow River Road on the southwest the Santa Rosa–Okaloosa county line, and Garner Landing Road on the northeast side.

=== Okaloosa County ===
In much of Okaloosa County, US 90 takes one of the names given to the former sections in Santa Rosa County; the "Old Spanish Trail." The first community it runs through is Holt, where it moves slightly further away from the railroad tracks at the intersection of Cooper Lane, and then encounters CR 189, a county extension of SR 189. It runs in a 2.7 miles (4.3 km) concurrency with CR 189 that shifts back to the side of the tracks before reaching Summertime Drive, which then turns north onto Galliver Cutoff to meet the state highway it was originally part of. Later it crosses a bridge over the P&A Subdivision, and then serves as the eastern terminus of SR 4 in Milligan, however it also shares a hidden concurrency with SR 4 as both roads run along West James Lee Boulevard. One intersection with the southern terminus of CR 397 (Old River Road), and its dirt road extension Ellis Road exists before US 90/SR 4 cross a bridge over the Yellow River. East of this bridge, the road becomes a four-lane divided highway and County Road 4 branches off to the southeast and leads to southern Crestview.

US 90 enters Crestview itself where the divider ends at CR 188, but remains four-lanes wide. Further into the city, it runs along the border of the Crestview Commercial Historic District and then encounters an intersection with Main Street where West James Lee Boulevard becomes East James Lee Boulevard, and then intersects SR 85 and Courthouse Terrace on the southwest corner of that intersection. US 90 leaves the historic district at Industrial Drive, and then passes by Twin Hills Park on the south side, and the Okaloosa County Jail on the north side. At the intersection with Del Cerro Camino, the road changes from a four-lane undivided highway to a four-lane divided one. East of Crestview, US 90 remains four lanes wide as it crosses a bridge over Mandle Creek, but narrows down to a two lane undivided highway before crossing the bridge over the Shoal River. The rest of the way through the county it includes both names "East James Lee Boulevard" and "Old Spanish Trail", as it meanders around rural Okaloosa County. As it enters Killingsworth Crossroads, the road runs along the north side of the P&A Subdivision, but the tracks begin to move away momentarily as it enters Deerland, where it encounters the southern terminus of CR 393. The tracks return to the side of the road just west of the intersection of Mare Creek Drive, and will remain on this side even as both pass through some last developments hidden away on both sides before it crosses the Okaloosa-Walton county Line.

=== Walton County ===
Shortly after crossing the county line, US 90 continues to carry the name "Old Spanish Trail" where it enters the community of Bottle Branch and serves as the northern border of Eglin Air Force Base, although some private property occasionally can be found. Here the road serves as the northern terminus of State Road 285. Continuing along the northern edge of the base, US 90 and I-10 run parallel to each other, until the base territory ends, and I-10 moves to the southeast. In DeFuniak Springs, US 90 runs along the north side of the DeFuniak Springs Airport where it is joined in a concurrency with southbound US 331. After the airport US 90/331 runs along the north side of the DeFuniak Springs Country Club and then intersects a street named Baldwin Avenue, a city street that runs along the north side of the P&A Subdivision. This concurrency ends as US 331 turns south onto unmarked State Road 83 (Freeport Road), which joins US 90 as they both enter the DeFuniak Springs Historic District until it heads north onto North Ninth Street. US 90 doesn't leave the historic district until the intersection of Second Street, but it encounters three other local intersections after this. A sure sign that the road's presence in the city is coming to an end, is when it approaches the east end of Baldwin Avenue with Dorsey Avenue as the road curves to the northeast along the railroad tracks, eventually leaving DeFuniak Spring and turning more toward the east again. In 2026, a portion of the highway, between Lancelot Road and Oakridge Way, was named “Deputy William May Memorial Highway”, in honor of fallen police officer William May.

As the road enters the former community of Koerber, and then passes by the site of the former railroad station, US 90 appears to serve as the southern terminus of CR 183 (Kidd Road). However, CR 183 secretly joins US 90 in a concurrency as they both climb a small hill, and shortly descend near a small industrial area. US 90/CR 183 curve slightly to the southeast as they enter Argyle, where CR 183 secretly joins CR 10A, while US 90 briefly curves to the northeast. CR 10A is named Old Highway 90), then removes the name "Old Spanish Trail" from US 90 as it crosses US 90 before both the old and "new" versions of US 90 cross the Walton-Holmes County Line.

=== Holmes and Washington Counties ===
US 90 winds around western rural Holmes County, as it does in much of the state. On the opposite side of a land mass called Long Pond Hill, US 90 finally reunites with the Old Spanish Trail at CR 10A, at an intersection also shared with a dirt road called the Baker Manning Loop. Shortly after this, the road enters its first municipality in the county, the Town of Ponce De Leon, where the only major intersection is an unsignalized one with State Road 81. The intersection with SR 81 would actually be a wye, if the west leg didn't continue south towards I-10 at Exit 96, Redbay, and points south. Shortly after the east leg of the wye with SR 81, US 90 crosses over Sandy Creek and then encounters the northern terminus of CR 181A (Ponce de Leon Springs Road), at an intersection also shared by Old Mill Road, a local city/county street. CR 181A leads to Ponce de Leon Springs State Park, and then down to CR 181. East of there, the road crosses a bridge over the P&A Subdivision, but before leaving Ponce de Leon, US 90 has another encounter with CR 10A (Old US 90) east of the eastern terminus of Main Street. CR 10A is encountered again at Oak Grove Church Road, but the FDOT maps still includes the abandoned section between Oak Grove Church Road and US 90.

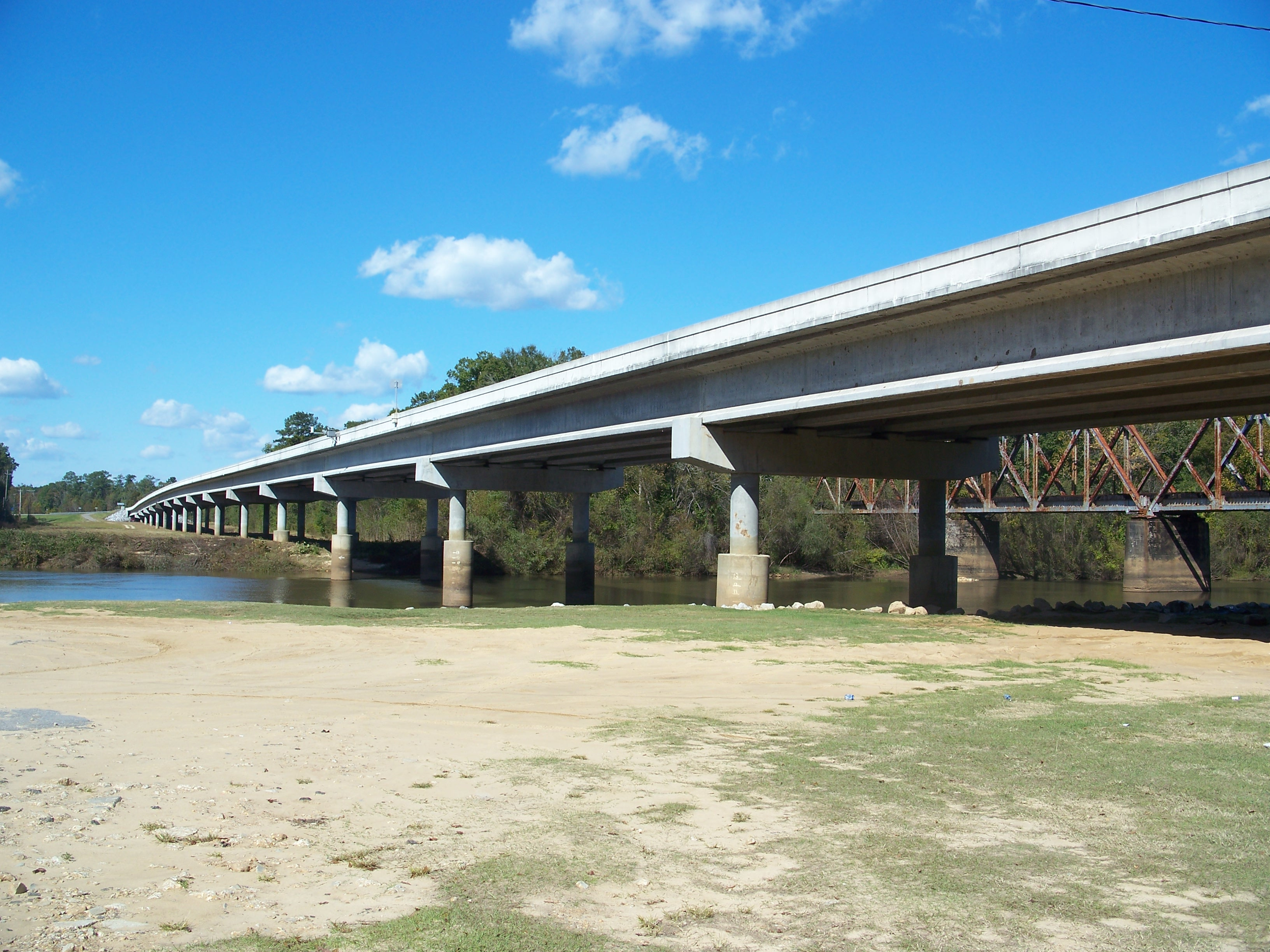
George L. Dickenson Bridge

Just as US 90 enters Westville a concurrency with CR 181 (South Cypress Street) begins, and US 90/CR 181 run parallel to CR 181C (R.M. Ward Road). The concurrency and the parallel suffixed route end when CR 181 turns north onto Pine Street, and the alignment of US 90 shifts back towards the east. But just as it briefly runs direct east, it turns southeast again, as it approaches the George L. Dickerson Bridge over the Choctawhatchee River, and thus the Holmes-Washington County Line, upon which it immediately enters the Town of Caryville, maintaining the street name "Old Spanish Trail." The southeast corner of this bridge contains a local parallel street to a boat ramp. Despite running through a clearly defined town, US 90 runs by very few established landmarks, one of which is Caryville Town Hall and then intersects with Church Street, the southern side of which was a former segment of CR 279. Roughly two blocks after this it encounters the northern terminus of CR 279, which leads to I-10 at Exit 104, and then to Vernon, and Greenhead. Almost instantly the road crosses a bridge over a tributary to the Choctawhatchee River. Shortly after the embankment for this bridge ends, the road has two other local intersections before encountering the southern terminus of CR 179, which leads north to Pittman. East of there it is not only named Old Spanish Trail, but Brown Avenue. US 90 leaves the Caryville Town limits and meanders around the thumb of Washington County running through Garnair Airport, before it re-enters Holmes County, continuing to use "Old Spanish Trail" as the street name.

=== Holmes and Washington Counties; The second run ===
In its second journey through Holmes County, US 90 runs in a straight line northeast and southwest at least one block away from the P&A line until it reaches Boswell Road and curves to the southeast beginning to move slightly further away from that line. East of the intersection of West Banfill Avenue, which forks off to the northeast, US 90 becomes a four-lane divided highway again. Along this segment it passes by the Holmes County High School on the south side just before entering Bonifay. At the intersection of CR 173, the divider ends abruptly, and the rest of the road remains a four-lane undivided highway well through the intersection with State Road 79, narrowing down to two lanes at Weeks Street. Two government offices can be found outside of the city limits. Many of the surroundings after this transform into farmland, and then sparse residences, and the road even runs through a forest on its way out of the county.

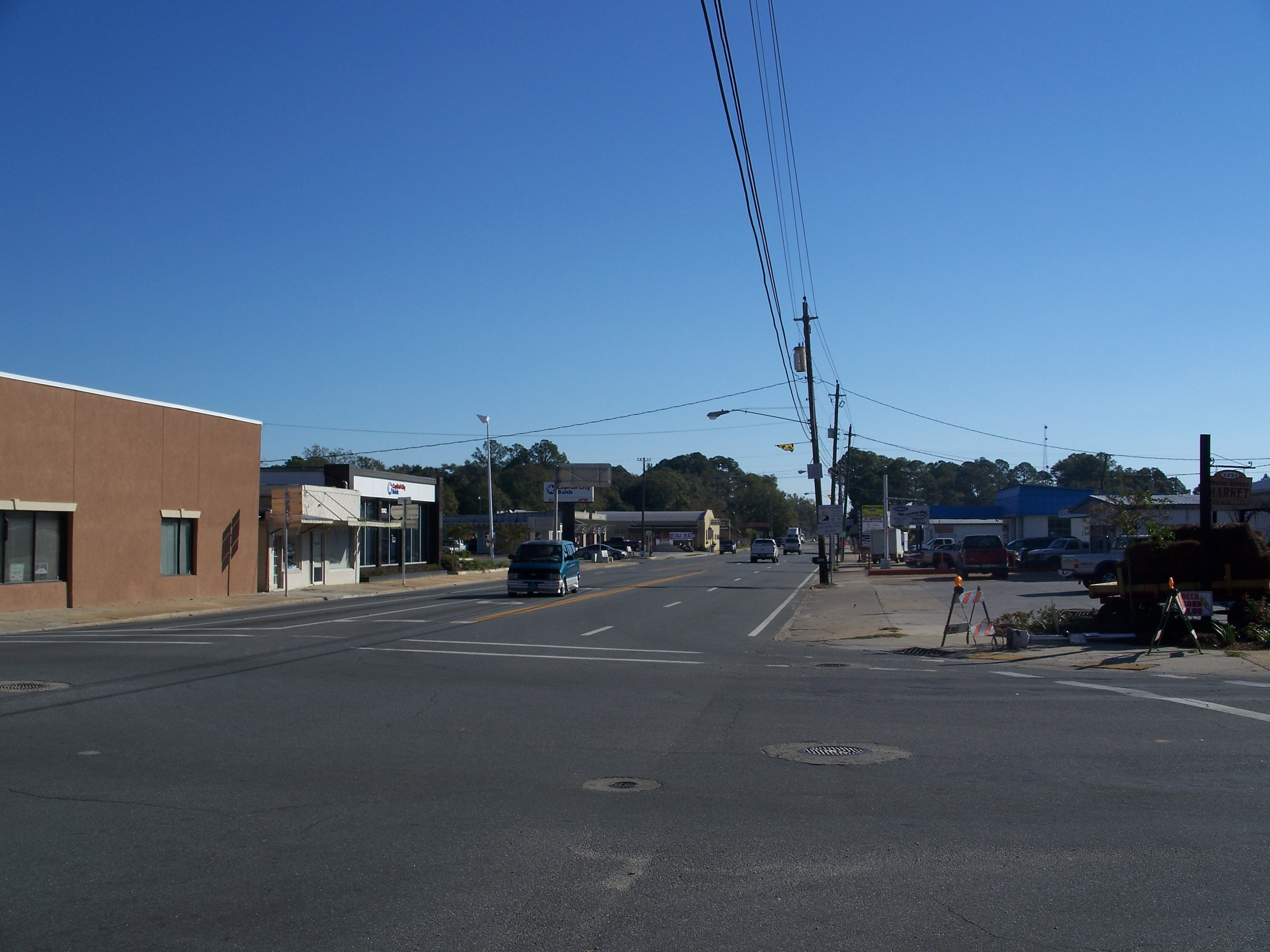
US 90 east of the intersection of SR 77 (Main Street) in Chipley

At a bridge over Holmes Creek, US 90 returns to Washington County. Few locations along this segment are of any note, other than a one-lane dirt road named Ray's Place that leads across the tracks to Vosika's Airport. However, just east of the site of the former Hulaw L&N Railroad Station, US 90 becomes the northern terminus of State Road 277, and then turns into a four-lane undivided highway once again. At Hoyt Street, the road becomes West Jackson Avenue as it officially enters Chipley, where it passes by Washington County Public Library, and City Hall across the street, which is not to be confused with the old City Hall, listed on the National Register of Historic Places and located further into town. Second Street is where the name of the road changes from West Jackson Avenue to Jackson Avenue. East of Third Street, which has a South Third Street Historic District south of US 90, the historic Washington County Courthouse can be found on the south side of the street, where Fourth Street would be. Naturally, the next intersection is Fifth Street, which leads to the Old City Hall and the Woman's Club of Chipley. One block later, Main Street is actually State Road 77, and also has a hidden concurrency with SR/CR 273. A block from there, Seventh Street leads to the Chipley Amtrak Station, as well as the former L&N Depot it replaced. Finally, at Martin Luther King Jr. Drive (formerly Eighth Street), the name changes to East Jackson Avenue, which remains four lanes wide until after it passes the grounds of the Florida Department of Transportation's District Three headquarters, and narrows down to two lanes. From there, it retains the name Old Spanish Trail.

The road briefly tries to move straight east and west pulling away from the railroad tracks but returns to the same angle before the intersection with New Prospect Road. It maintains the usual surroundings of woodlands and farms interrupted by local streets, some of which are actually paved. The last intersection in Washington County is Candy Kitchen Road, then US 90 crosses the Washington-Jackson County Line from the southwest to the northeast, and immediately encounters the intersection with Woodrest Road.

=== Jackson County ===
Every other street that US 90 intersects from that point on is local and even less notable until it reaches County Road 195 (Sapp Road). Shortly after the road intersects Railroad Street, it enters the City of Cottondale, where the street name changes to Levy Street, and the asphalt becomes concrete as it descends beneath a 14-foot-4-inch (4.37 m) concrete arch bridge beneath the Atlanta and Saint Andrews Bay Railway. Out from under that bridge, one other local intersection can be found to the south before the road intersects U.S. Route 231. After the intersection with Willow Street, another former segment of the road named "Pontiac Loop," branches off to the southeast. As the road leaves the city limits, it makes a slight curve to the southeast at London Road, which ends when it meets Whiteville Road, but not until after Pontiac Loop terminates with US 90. The route remains straight east and west from here, and along the way has an intersection with unmarked former CR 10A (Old Cottondale Road). Two intersections later, US 90 is given the name West Lafayette Street before it enters the City of Marianna where right after entering the city limits it curves to the northeast to run beneath a bridge under the P&A Subdivision followed by a sudden change into a four-lane undivided highway and a wye with the intersection of State Road 73. At the southeast leg of this wye a concurrency with SR 73 begins, which itself has a concurrency with CR 164. US 90/SR 73/CR 164 serves as the eastern terminus of State Road 276 (Pennsylvania Avenue), which continues north as Bumpnose Road. Later it becomes the eastern terminus of former CR 10A (Old Cottondale Road). After curving around the 1895-built Joseph W. Russ Jr. House which is also the county visitor center, and then the 1840-built Ely-Criglar House and a bed & breakfast next door, the road intersects Wynn Street and serves as the southern border of the Marianna Historic District, remaining four-lanes wide.

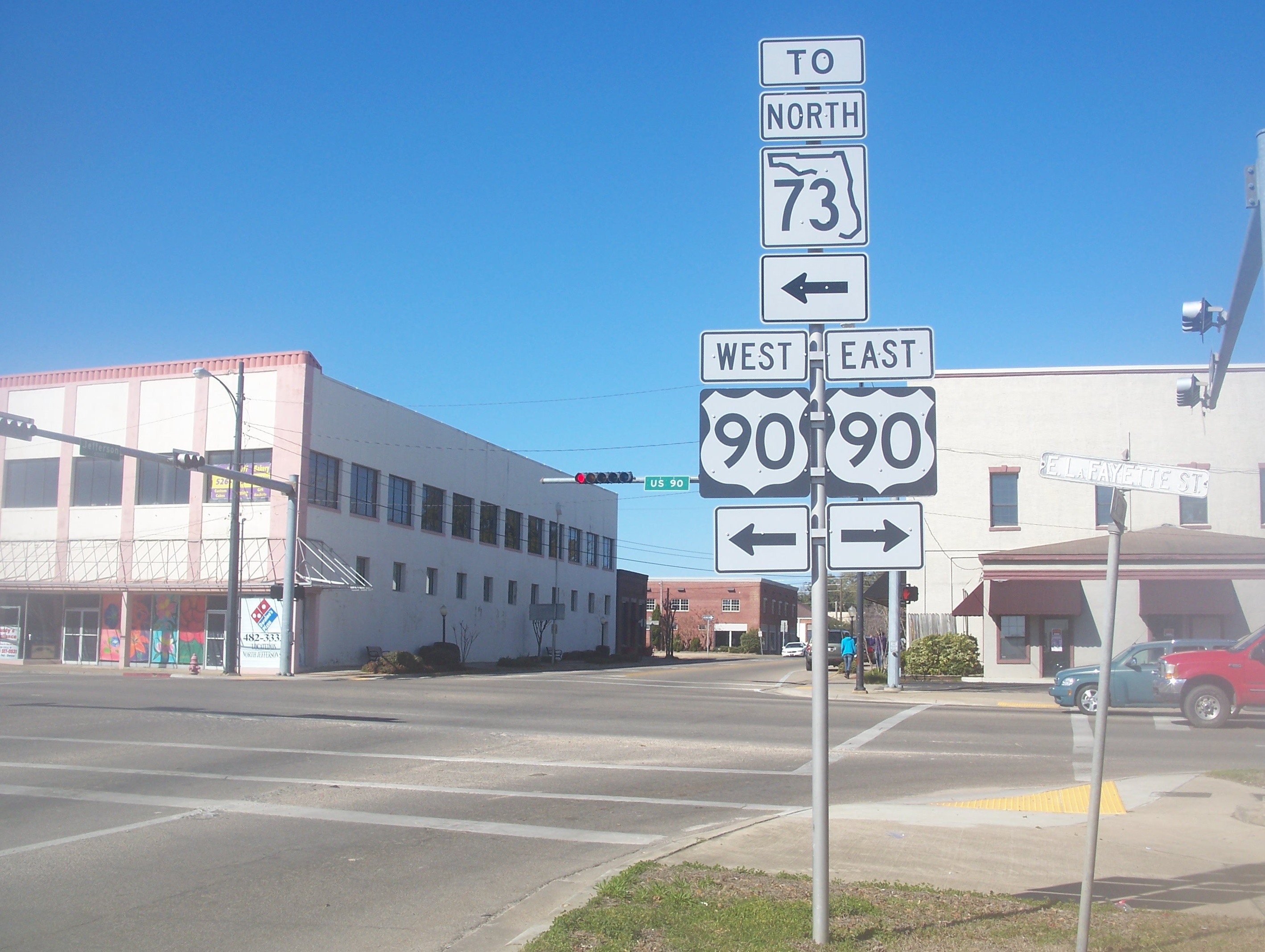
US 90 from the beginning of the concurrency with northbound SR 73

The US 90/SR 73 concurrency ends at the southern terminus of State Road 166 (Jefferson Street), where SR 73 turns south, but the concurrency with CR 164 continues along US 90 which becomes East Lafayette Street. As the border of the historic district ends between Chipola and Bertram Streets, US 90/CR 164 runs behind the backyard of the St. Luke Missionary Baptist Church on Jackson Street which runs parallel to the south. After encountering the intersection with Jackson Street, the road changes from a four-lane undivided highway into a four-lane divided highway as it crosses a bridge over the Chipola River and leaves the Marianna city limits. The first intersection east of the Chipola River is a street named "Old U.S. Road," which would seem to be a former section of US 90 by the name, but is not. Much more importantly, the next intersection is a wye with State Road 71, the west leg of the wye is the east end of the concurrency with CR 164, and the east leg of which is the west end of a concurrency with SR 71. US 90/SR 71 runs southeast and intersects some local streets before they cross a bridge over Merrits Mill Pond. At the end of this concurrency, SR 71 turns south, and a segment of the Old Spanish Trail resumes after this, running along the south side of the road. East of there, US 90 becomes a two-lane undivided highway again, intersecting only local streets.

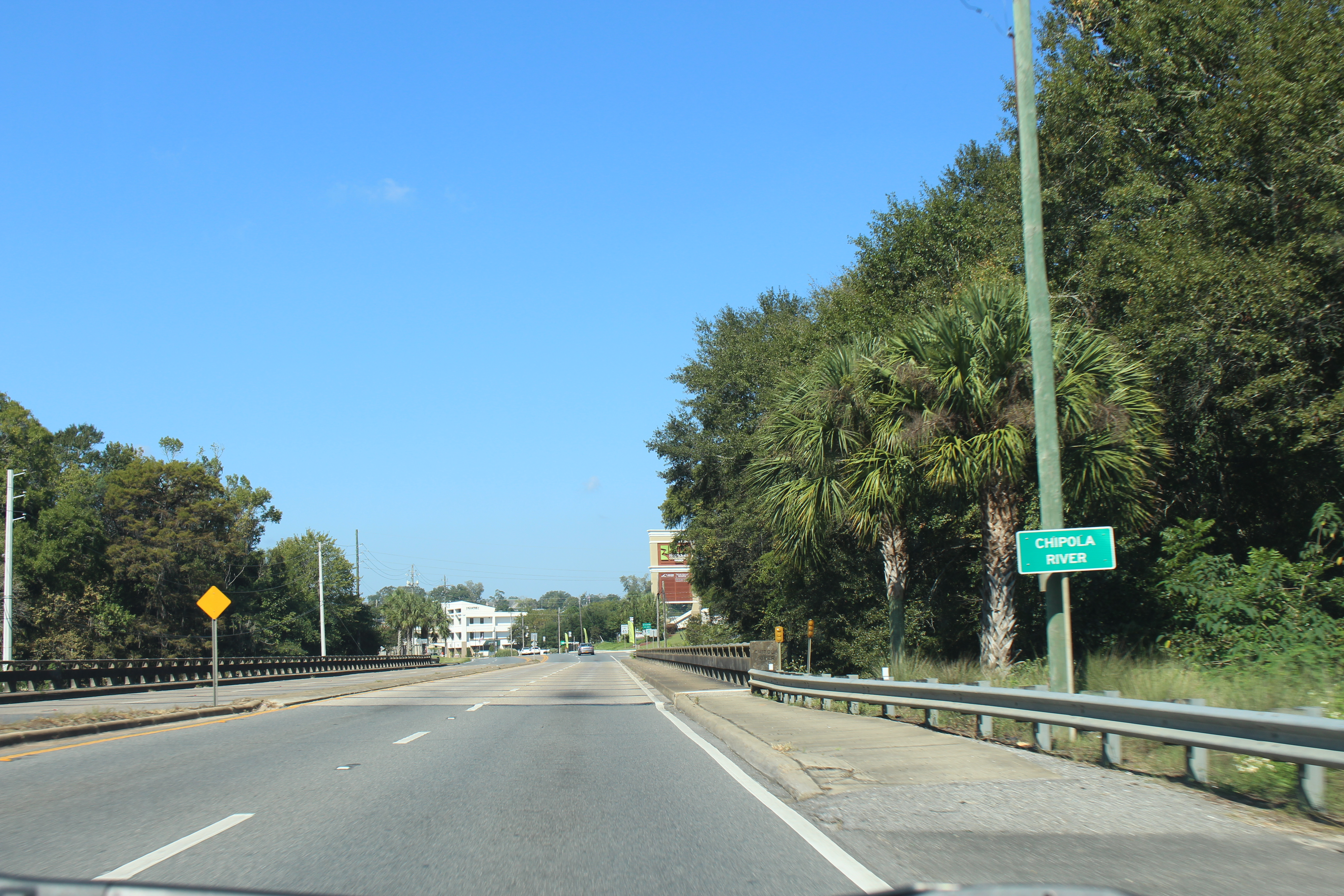
US 90 over the Chipola River in Mariana

North of Cypress the road intersects the northern terminus of CR 275 (Church Street) and then turns straight east, and continues in this trajectory as it enters the Town of Grand Ridge where it becomes a four-lane divided highway again and intersects State Road 69 (Porter Avenue). US 90 remains a four lane divided highway well east of the town limits. Nearly halfway outside of Grand Ridge, it intersects County Road 69A, where a short segment of "Old U.S. Highway 90" can be found on the northeast corner which actually ends at US 90 between the two ends of Morgan Loop, as it curves to the southeast. An abandoned segment of this road used to end at Mohawk Trail. As it enters the Town of Sneads it instantly has an intersection with County Road 10A (Keevers Road), which leads to the Old Spanish Trail. Further in town, it takes a slight turn to the northeast where it becomes a four-lane undivided highway as it runs along part of Three Rivers State Park before it serves as the southern terminus of County Road 271 (River Road), which runs along the west coast of the Jim Woodruff Reservoir and through parts of the Apalachee Wildlife Management Area, and then has an intersection with County Road 286 (Gloster Avenue) which leads to the last interchange with I-10 in the county, and then into Calhoun County. More than a block later, it narrows back down to two lanes. After curving to the southeast momentarily, CR 10A and the Old Spanish Trail reunite with US 90 before the road leaves town, and the road turns straight east once again. This alignment ends as it curves back to the southeast and approaches the last landmark along US 90 in Jackson County, the Apalachee Correctional Institute, a massive prison farm. East of that point, the road begins to cross the Victory Bridge over the floodplains of the Apalachicola River, but does not cross the river directly just yet, until it curves back to the east. A power line right of way and one last local intersection can be found before the road and bridge finally crosses the river itself between the Jim Woodruff Dam and the Old Victory Bridge, where US 90 finally leaves what is historically considered "West Florida."

=== Gadsden County ===
In Gadsden County, US 90 leaves the Central Time Zone and enters the Eastern Time Zone as it crosses the Victory Bridge over the Appalachicola River entering the City of Chattahoochee. Most of the road in the county is named "Memorial Blue Star Highway," except in specific cities. This area is where the route is closest to the Florida-Georgia State Line. It is also where the route gains a concurrency with County Road 269 between Bolivar Street (which is the westernmost street leading to Georgia) and Main Street. After passing by the Florida State Hospital, which includes the NRHP-listed U.S. Arsenal-Officers Quarters, another concurrency begins, this time with CR 269A, where the street name changes from West Washington Street to East Washington Street. After the route leaves the city and CR 269A turns north toward Georgia State Route 97, it starts to move further away from the border.

After the intersection with CR 369B in Oak Grove it passes by the Joshua Davis House and then curves southeast where it enters Mount Pleasant as it intersects CR 369. The CSX Tallahassee Subdivision which began in Chattahoochee and carried the Amtrak Sunset Limited approaches US 90 south of there in Saint John running entirely along the southwest side. The tracks follow US 90 even as it enters the City of Gretna where the road is named Main Street and the closest two intersections resembling major ones are with CR 268, and later CR 270A. Southeast of Gretna, the road enters Douglas City as it turns back east again as it joins a concurrency with State Road 12, which also contains a hidden concurrency with State Road 65, although Google Maps refers to it as County Road 65. The tracks begin to move away from US 90/SRs 12/65, but almost comes back just before the intersection with CR 274 before entering Quincy where the multiplex becomes West Jefferson Street. Within the city the roat encounters an at-grade railroad crossing with a spur of the Tallahassee Subdivision. This spur runs next to the beginning of the concurrency with State Road 267 and CR 268 once again. The concurrency with SR 267 may have been in the process of being eliminated though, as a four-lane stub extends a block north of US 90. US 90/SRs 12/65/267/CR 268 enter the Quincy Historic District at Stewart Street. Four blocks later at Adams Street, SR 267 leave US 90 to the north, and CR 268 turns in the opposite direction. Between there it runs in front of the Gadsden County Courthouse and a block later at Madison Street, SRs 12/65 turns north. From there, US 90 becomes East Jefferson Street.

Officially leaving the historic district east of Love Street, the road passes by a Sheriff's office and the Eastern Cemetery turning southeast again, just before it leaves the city and becomes a four-lane divided highway, but it clings to the name "East Jefferson Street" until just before the Gadsden Medical Center complex. The road briefly strays from the southeast trajectory to cross over the Little River and Hurricane Creek and then heads back to the southeast. It serves as the termini of CR 159 and CR 268 before the road enters Midway. The road leaves and re-enters Midway twice before it crosses I-10 once again at Exit 192, which is a parclo interchange. Here it re-enters Midway for the third and last time. The CSX Tallahassee Subdivision finally meets up with the south side of US 90 again before both cross separate bridges over the Ochlockonee River where they cross the Gadsden-Leon County Line.

=== Leon County, Tallahassee, and Jefferson County ===
As New Quincy Highway, US 90's southeast trajectory is diminished somewhat in Ochlockonee where it serves as the northern termini of CR 1585, CR 1583, and CR 1581, then curves slightly to the northeast. The road's entry into downtown Tallahassee is inevitable, but first it runs along part of the city line and intersects with State Road 263, which is part of the Capital Circle. Just before entering the capital completely, it intersects State Road 20, which joins SR 10 as an additional hidden route, later becoming West Tennessee Street. US 90 then passes the north entrance of Florida State University and expands to six-lanes, also intersecting streets that lead to Florida A&M University, until its junction with US 27 which is momentarily co-signed with SRs 61 and 373. Here, SR 20 turns right and becomes the hidden state road for US 27 until it reaches High Springs in Alachua County. The rest of the way, US 90 is four lanes wide. The northeast corner of US 90 and County Road 146 serves as the territory for Leon High School, starting with a separate section for Leon Performing Arts. This territory ends across from South Franklin Boulevard (CR 1555). After that, the road curves to the northeast, and gains two frontage roads, the longer of which is named Briarcliff road which runs along the south side, and the railroad tracks that usually run close to US 90 run south of that. Briarcliff Road ends at Short Street, and the next major intersection is the northern terminus of State Road 265 and southern terminus of County Road 151, where US 90's name change from East Tennessee Street to Mahan Drive. The railroad tracks that usually run close to US 90 begins to move to the southeast across from Spottswood Drive. The next major intersections are with CR 373 (Blair Stone Road) and then US 319 which is also part of the Capital Circle. Just east of there across the city line is the intersection with the west end of Former State Road 158.

The road stays out of the city in the same direction only to return to it momentarily in the vicinity of another parclo interchange with I-10 at Exit 209. As it leaves the capital limits for the last time, it tries to straighten out only to curve at an even sharper northeast angle. Approaching the vicinity of Wadesboro it takes a curve to the southeast again where County Road 59, a bi-county extension of State Road 59 joins US 90 in a concurrency. After crossing a creek leading to Long Pond on the southwest side, the road briefly enters a corner of Jefferson County but re-enters Leon County again to intersect CR 154 (Old Magnolia Drive) as it lets go of CR 59. Besides some private roads, the only other intersections after this are Sunray Road, the south side of which leads to Letchworth Mounds State Park in Jefferson County, and later a road to a boat ramp on the southwest bank of Lake Miccosukee. The road re-enters Jefferson County again after crossing a causeway over the southern end of Lake Miccosukee and is named West Washington Street. Most of the road in Jefferson County runs through forestland with broken by occasional ranch land on the south side, along sporadic bridges crossing small creeks and intersecting with local roads of no importance until it reaches County Road 158A (Old Lloyd Road), which leads to the Lloyd Historic District.

The official point where US 90 skirts the border with Monticello is near the Crooked Creek housing development, although most of the rural surroundings continue, as it enters the rest of the city. A local street named Mahan Drive merges with US 90, and may have been part of the original version of the road in Leon County. East of there, the road passes through more historic sections of the city, where it passes by the Avera-Clarke House, now a bed & breakfast, and later the NRHP-listed Monticello High School on the southwest corner of West Washington and South Water Streets. Another NRHP-listed site on US 90 is the Perkins Opera House on the south side between Mulberry Street and the traffic circle with US 19 which contains the Jefferson County Courthouse in the center, and itself is part of the Monticello Historic District.

As one might expect, the name of US 90 changes to East Washington Street east of the courthouse and traffic circle, but it keeps that name as it leaves the city line at Simpson Avenue. After the road intersects a spur to CR 146 named "Catholic Church Side," US 90 curves to the southeast, although it briefly curves to the east to cross a bridge over Wolf Creek, only to turn southeast once again. Few intersections at this point are of any significance other than one leading to the Jefferson County Corrections Institute and a dead end street leading to a local cemetery. This changes though when it encounters the intersection with CR 257 north of Aucilla One last dirt road in the county on the north side is Gramling Road which leads to the Upper Aucilla Conservation Area, but further along two other dirt roads on the south side can be found before it crosses a bridge over the Aucilla River, where US 90 leaves Jefferson County and enters Madison County.

=== Madison County ===
As expected the first streets to intersect US 90 are local ones of little importance until it reaches the southwestern terminus of Honey Lake Road, then curves southeast to cross a bridge over the Little Aucilla River, an eastern tributary of the Aucilla River. The road then tries to curve more to the east as it passes by Pellis Springs Road and later Hensey Cemetery. The CSX Tallahassee Subdivision encounters US 90 once again between Northwest First Avenue and moves away from it again before the intersection with Northwest Tenth Loop before the road enters Greenville. Grand Street veers off to the right to move closer to the tracks, but it also serves as the means of getting to Grand Avenue which follows the tracks throughout the town. Meanwhile, Grand Street actually returns to US 90 just before it reaches the west end of the concurrency with US 221 at Pitt Street. Together US 90-221 intersects an at-grade crossing with a Georgia and Florida Railway line that often stays in close proximity to US 221, and then passes by the Haffye Hays Park, a local park that contains a memorial to Ray Charles. After passing by some local industry, US 221 turns south near the historic Bishop-Andrews Hotel, but US 90 picks up a concurrency with Former State Road 150. When US 90/CR 150 encounters Evergreen Cemetery, it's a sign that Grand Avenue is about to end, and thus the railroad tracks will be in sight once again. CR 150 turns north toward northern Madison County, while US 90 continues east, winding around much of rural central Madison County. The railroad tracks start to move further and further away from US 90 again after the first intersection with Elizabeth H. Sims Road.

In the vicinity of Madison County High School, the road briefly becomes a wider undivided highway with provisions for left-turning lanes, but then narrows back down to two lanes. In the City of Madison itself US 90 is named Base Street, which becomes a four-lane undivided highway between Southwest Captain Brown Road and College Loop, both of which were part and all of former US 90 respectively. Halfway between College Loop is a pair of intersections with both Lawson Circle and Turner Davis Drive, the latter of which is an entrance to North Florida Community College. After the intersection with CR 360A, the road turns straight east and west again. The historic Wardlaw-Smith House is on the northwest corner of US 90 and North Washington Street, which is also where the concurrency with State Road 53 begins, as well as the accompanying Florida Short Route, and Lone Star Trail. Later it intersects Range Road and North Range Road, the former of which leads to SR 14, and the northeast corner of which is the location of the city's Four Freedoms Monument. Across US 90 from it is the Madison County Courthouse. Three blocks later the concurrency with SR 53 ends at Duval Street, when SR 53 turns south. The same intersection is also the southern terminus of State Road 145. East of this point US 90 remains a four-lane undivided highway until it almost reaches Northeast 22nd Street, where it narrows down to two lanes. It remains straight east until it approaches the at-grade interchange with State Road 6 and turns southeast. Along this segment, US 90 tries to avoid moving further toward a southerly direction than an easterly one and finally succeeds in doing so when it enters Lee. The main crossroad along US 90 in Lee is CR 255, a south-to-north road that spans from CR 53 near the Madison-Lafayette County Line near Mayo to CR 150 near Pinetta. It also provides the last chance for access to I-10 in the county. East of the city, it runs along the north side of the railroad tracks once again, although it begins to pull away from the tracks at the intersections of Beulah Church Road and Southeast 208th Street.

Within Twin Rivers State Forest, US 90 veers to the southeast as it approaches the intersection of CR 141 (Myrrh Road), a bi-county road that leads to the Jennings area near the Georgia border, and rises along an embankment over the CSX line that was used by the Sunset Limited, only to curve back to the same direction it ran before that intersection. 9/10 of a mile after some power lines which also serve as an entrance to the forest on the south side, the west end of the former US 90 ROW that used the Hillman Bridge (Old Ellaville Bridge), is used as the means of reaching Northeast Ellaville Central Avenue. Both the existing road and former road curve south again in order to cross the Suwannee River, and therefore leaves Madison County entering Suwannee County.

=== Suwannee County ===
Continuing southeast, the highway remains a two-lane road north of I-10 as it passes by Suwannee River State Park, where it encounters the east end of the former ROW that used the Hillman Bridge, the western terminus of County Road 132 which is a direct route to Suwannee Springs, and the unincorporated community of Ellaville. The CSX line previously used by the Sunset Limited hugs the side of the road once again, this time on the north side. After passing through Falmouth, US 90 has another parclo interchange with I-10 at Exit 275, and goes south of I-10 once again. East of there, the road is named Howard Street.

Local streets lead to the Suwannee County Airport south of the road and just west of the City of Live Oak, and the tracks that hugged the north side of the road west of the city move a block north, as the road enters the city. At Houston Avenue US 90 is joined by County Road 249, which follows it in a short concurrency for four blocks until it reaches U.S. Route 129 (Ohio Avenue) where it turns south and becomes hidden SR 249. The intersection between US 90 and US 129 are the official four corners of the city. Outside of Live Oak, US 90 becomes the eastern terminus of CR 10A and then the northern terminus of CR 49, a county extension of State Road 49. East of there, the road intersects primarily local streets, among them 89th Road, a road leading to "Wings 'N' Sunsets" Airport. After this it inconspicuously runs through Houston where it encounters the southern terminus of unmarked CR 417. Just before entering Wellborn, US 90 encounters another segment of CR 10A that veers off to the northeast. The only other resemblance of a major intersection in Wellborn is CR 137. CR 10A ends at US 90 before it crosses the Suwannee-Columbia County Line.

=== Columbia and Baker Counties ===
Rural western Columbia County provides some surprisingly interesting intersections, the first of which is the northern terminus of County Road 252A, a suffixed alternate of Suwannee-County Road 252. The next is the southern terminus of County Road 135 which leads to Bahia and CR 250. The shared intersections of Northwest Turner Road and Pinemount Road is also where the Lake City border runs along the north side of US 90 until it reaches the intersection of Whispering Pine Road, and then moves away. The last intersection with a non-local street in this region is with eastern terminus of County Roads 252A and northern terminus of County Roads 252B. US 90 enters Lake City as Duval Street just in time to encounter a diamond-interchange with I-75 at exit 427. Almost instantly it serves as the northeastern terminus of State Road 247, and then begins to curve to the northeast. Along this segment, it also serves as the northern terminus of CR 341, but mote importantly serves as the western terminus of SR 10A (Baya Drive), From there it turns straight east again at Eadle Street. Other than various local streets, US 90 has an intersection with U.S. Route 41 (hidden SR 25) and SR 100, which turns from US 41 onto US 90. Merely three blocks from US 41, US 90/SRs 10 & 100 encounters an intersection with one of its spur routes, US 441 (SRs 25A/47). The Desoto Trail and Florida Short Routes turn south here but the Lone Star Trail continues along US 90. East of the city limits in Newco, SR 100 becomes an independent route as it branches off to the southeast on its way to Starke, Palatka, and Flagler Beach, while US 90 continues east later serving as the eastern terminus of SR 10A. Both roads serve as the border of Lake City Municipal Airport. Later on in Mount Carrie, US 90 itself serves as the southern border for the Osceola National Forest and is the location of the Lake City Correctional Facility and Columbia Correctional Institute before crossing the Columbia-Baker County Line where it enters the forest itself.

After leaving Osceola National Forest just west of CR 250A, it passes Olustee Battlefield Historic State Park, and then has one final interchange with I-10 at Exit 324, running north of the interstate where it will remain for the duration of its journey. In Sanderson US 90 encounters CR 229, which it has a one-block concurrency with until it reaches CR 127. The road encounters an intersection with Arnold Rhoden Road which leads to a former segment of US 90 that serves as the road to Sanderson Cemetery. US 90 runs parallel to this road as it then crosses a bridge over the CSX Line that was used by the Sunset Limited. East of Margaretta, the road encounters two other local county roads; the southern terminus of CR 139, and then the northern terminus of CR 123. Both roads lose their designations less than five miles from US 90. The Town of Glen St. Mary is where the road is given the name Mount Vernon Avenue, and it crosses CR 125 (Glenn Street), and then becomes a four-lane undivided highway even as it leaves town two-thirds of the way between Hillard Avenue and Wildcat Road. The road crosses what has been designated the "South Prong" of the St. Mary's River, and then enters Macclenny, where the name turns into Macclenny Avenue. The first major intersection in the city is County Road 23A (Lowder Street), but far more important is the intersection with State Road 121 (Sixth Street). Merely a block away it becomes the western terminus of State Road 228, and southern terminus of County Road 23B, both of which are Fifth Street. Beyond the city limits, the road continues along the same trajectory along with the parallel CSX line on the south side until they both cross the Baker-Nassau County Line, where it veers slightly to the northwest.

=== Nassau and Duval Counties ===
Within US 90's brief stay in Nassau County as North Beaver Road, it encounters only two dirt roads, the former crossing of an abandoned railroad line, and then a third dirt road. The only bridge in the county is over another tributary to the St. Marys River. It then crosses the Nassau-Duval County Line, where it also enters the Jacksonville City Limits and has its first intersection with County Road 121. Later the road momentarily leaves Jacksonville and enters Baldwin, where it has a concurrency with U.S. Route 301 for several blocks. This concurrency may disappear if the Florida Department of Transportation decides to build the proposed Baldwin Bypass around the western edge of town. Immediately after another railroad crossing with the CSX Callahan Subdivision, both US 90 and 301 narrow down to two lanes at the east end of this concurrency, and then US 90 re-enters Jacksonville. As it passes along the north side of Cecil Airport, the road intersects CR 119, where the name changes from Lake City Road back to Beaver Street. It then runs north of the current northern terminus of the First Coast Expressway (State Road 23), which is intended to be extended to US 90. Next is the intersection of Chaffee Road, which is now CR 115C south of US 90. East of Chaffee Road, the road runs along the north side of part of the CSX Jacksonville Terminal Subdivision, until Devoe Street when it pulls away from the tracks and then runs straight east and west again at the southeast end of Bulls Bay Highway. No access is available to Interstate 295 because of the close proximity of the interchange with I-10, but the bridge beneath it contains a right-of-way for a future westbound lane. A large railroad wye does exist at the eastern edge of this underpass and a moderate intersection can be found east of there with the northern terminus of SR 103, which becomes an unmarked city street north of the road. Several blocks later, the road maintains the same trajectory, becoming four-lanes through the industrialized west side just west of SR 111. It also serves as the northern terminus of State Road 129.

As it approaches Downtown Jacksonville, a single ramp leads to both southbound and northbound Interstate 95 while an unconventional southbound only off-ramp connects to the road between the two carriageways of I-95 and then it encounters southbound U.S. Route 1 (Main Street) where it turns right, while U.S. Alternate Route 90 (SR 10A) continues for one block east, then turns left onto northbound US 1 (Ocean Avenue), only to turn back east again a block after that onto Union Street. Already in another concurrency with US 1 since Union and State Streets, SR 228 runs along US 1/90 until it reaches Duval and Adams Streets then branches off to the east. At Bay Street, the northern terminus of SR Spur 15 can be found. US 1/90 crosses the St. Johns River on the Main Street Bridge then turns east again along State Road 13 at Prudential Drive. This concurrency lasts until SR 13 turns south onto Hendricks Avenue, and US 1/90 turn south a block later at Kings Avenue. US 90 runs along southbound US 1 until it reaches another interchange with I-95 heading south towards, Daytona Beach, Miami, and the Florida Keys, taking the Old Spanish Trail and Lone Star Trail with it, while US 90 turns east again onto Atlantic Boulevard, which branches off to the northeast at an interchange as a separate SR 10. US 90 continues in the same trajectory as Beach Boulevard and for the last 14.826 miles (23.860 km), the hidden route for this segment is SR 212.

==== State Road 212 ====
State Road 212
- Location: Jacksonville–Jacksonville Beach
- Length: 14.826 mi (23.860 km)

The first major intersection US 90 encounters as Beach Boulevard (SR 212) is a parclo interchange with U.S. Alternate Route 1, known as the Hart Expressway. Next is an at-grade intersection with State Road 109 (University Boulevard), and later the eastern terminus of SR 228 (Commodore Point Expressway), which terminates in the median of Beach Boulevard and like US ALT 1 leads to the Hart Bridge Expressway back into Downtown Jacksonville. The road then crosses a bridge over Pottsburg Creek, a tributary of the St. Johns River, and later encounters the eastern terminus of U.S. Alternate Route 90 which is also shared by an intersection with State Road 115 (Southside Boulevard). After passing by Forestry Tower Park, and then intersecting St. John's Bluff Road, it gains access to Interstate 295 that it couldn't have in western Jacksonville, albeit with a single-point urban interchange. From there the road becomes the dividing line between Florida State College - South Campus and the University of North Florida, which ironically is on the south side of US 90, while FSC South is on the north side. Another SPUI variant can be found at Kernan Boulevard, though this road is not a limited-access highway at all. The last two intersections that pass for major ones in Jacksonville are Hodges Boulevard and then CR 101A (San Pablo Boulevard). Near its eastern terminus, it crosses the B.B. McCormick Bridge, leaving Jacksonville and entering Jacksonville Beach, continuing east through commercial establishments before finally ending its eastward journey at SR A1A in Jacksonville Beach. However, Beach Boulevard continues for 0.139 miles (0.224 km) eastward as County Road 212, ending at First Avenue North.

== History ==
=== State Road 1 ===
- Florida State Road No. 1
- U.S. National Register of Historic Places
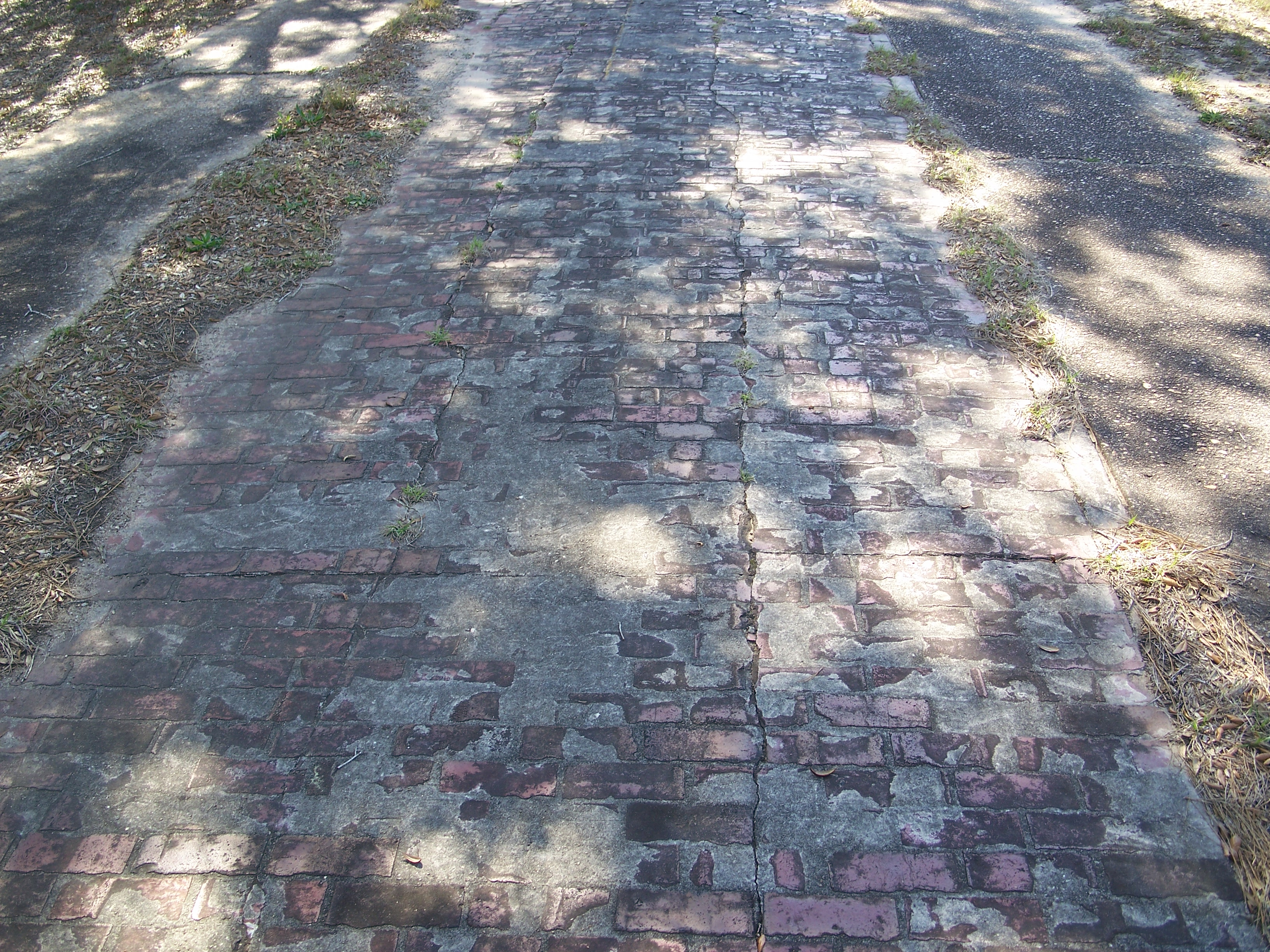
- Location: Santa Rosa County, Florida, USA
- Nearest city: Milton, Florida
- NRHP reference No.: 94000626
- Added to NRHP: June 23, 1994

The Florida State Road No. 1 (also known as the Old Brick Road, Red Brick Road, U.S. Highway 90, or Old Spanish Trail) is a historic road near Milton, Florida. It is located, roughly, in three sections east of Milton, parallel to US 90, between Marquis Bayou and Harold. On June 23, 1994, it was added to the National Register of Historic Places.

=== Beach Boulevard in Jacksonville (SR 212) ===
What is now called Beach Boulevard is actually an extension that was added to the original, post-Civil War road called Hogan Road, which stretched from the South bank of the St Johns River downtown, and led Southeast across the bridge over Little Pottsburg Creek and moved onward toward St Augustine. Hogan Road was named after the Hogan Family that were the first white settlers in Duval County. Hogan Road had two sections, the Northbank section moving north from the north bank of the St Johns River downtown, and the Southbank section moving south from the south bank of the St Johns River downtown. In the late 1930s, a new road called Beach Boulevard was built from the beaches toward Downtown Jacksonville until it intersected with the Southbank section of Hogan Road just west of what is now called Parental Home Road. The Southbank section of Hogan Road between Parental Home Road and the South bank of the St Johns River downtown was renamed Beach Boulevard and added to the new section, thus allowing the new Beach Boulevard to exist under one name from the South bank of the St Johns River, all the way out to the Atlantic Ocean. Other changes were made in the 1950s, when Interstate I-95 bisected the new Beach Blvd just south of the riverbank. All that is left of the original Hogan Road is the Northbank section downtown, and a small piece of the original Southbank section that stretches from just west of Parental Home Road South across the Little Pottsburg Creek, and ends at the intersection of Southside Boulevard.

Prior to the 1945 renumbering, it was State Road 376, added to the state road system by the Florida Legislature in 1937. The road was built on the right-of-way of the Florida East Coast Railway Mayport Branch (Jacksonville and Atlantic Railroad) to relieve traffic on the parallel Atlantic Boulevard (pre-1945 State Road 140, now State Road 10). Construction began before World War II but was suspended between fall 1941 and 1945. After the renumbering, it was reassigned to SR 212, and dedicated December 17, 1949, along with the B.B. McCormick Bridge over the Intracoastal Waterway.

=== Other history ===
Historical US 90 route markers

1926 design

1948 design

1956–1993, blue highway shields

From 1926 to 1949, US 90 ran along what is today part of State Road 12 from Quincy to Havana, and south along a concurrency with US 27 from Havana to Tallahassee. Other former segments of the route are scattered throughout the state. US 90's routing in Florida has not been changed since 1950.

In 1953, the segment between Tallahassee and Monticello was named Mahan Drive for a Monticello florist and horticulturalist named Fred Alfred Mahan (1886-1960) who beginning in 1935 was given a contract by the Coastal Roads Company of Miami, Florida to beautify and improve the road. This included the removal of dead stumps along the right of way of the Lake Miccosukee Causeway at the Leon-Jefferson County Line.

From 1956 until 1993, US 90 signs in Florida featured white numbering on a blue shield. The "color-coding" of U.S. Routes by the Florida Department of Transportation was stopped when the state could no longer use Federal funds to replace the signs with anything but the standard black-and-white version. Some blue US 90 signs may still remain.

After Hurricane Ivan destroyed the I-10 Bridge in Northwest Florida, motorists waited as long as 2 hours to cross the Escambia bridge between Santa Rosa and Escambia counties.

The Perdido River Bridge was replaced between 2010 and 2013.

== Major intersections ==
County	Location	mi	km	Destinations	Notes
Escambia		0.000	0.000	US 90 west (SR 16) – Mobile	Alabama state line (Perdido River bridge)
Escambia	Beulah	2.485	3.999	US 90 Alt. east (SR 10) to I-10 – Milton	East end of SR 10 overlap; west end of SR 10A overlap
Escambia		4.701	7.566	SR 99 north / CR 99 south (Beulah Road)	
Escambia		9.174	14.764	SR 173 (Blue Angel Parkway)	
Escambia		10.273	16.533	SR 297 north (Pine Forest Road) to I-10	
Escambia	Bellview	11.187	18.004	SR 296 east (Michigan Avenue) / CR 296 west (Saufley Field Road) – Perdido Key, truck route to NAS Pensacola	
Escambia	West Pensacola	13.580	21.855	SR 727 (Fairfield Drive) – Dog Track	
Escambia	West Pensacola	13.89	22.35	SR 295 south – Pensacola NAS, Naval Aviation Museum	Interchange; eastbound exit and westbound entrance
Escambia	West Pensacola	13.89	22.35	SR 295 north (Fairfield Drive)	Interchange; westbound exit and eastbound entrance
Escambia	West Pensacola	14.157	22.783	SR 295 south (New Warrington Road) – Pensacola NAS	
Escambia	Brownsville	15.418	24.813	CR 453 (North W Street)	
Escambia	Pensacola	15.623	25.143	CR 493 (T Street)	
Escambia	Pensacola	15.958	25.682	US 98 west (North Pace Boulevard) / SR 292	West end of US 98 overlap
Escambia	Pensacola	16.626	26.757	North E Street (CR 443 north)	
Escambia	Pensacola	17.395	27.995	US 29 (North Palafox Street)	Southern terminus of US 29
Escambia	Pensacola	17.59	28.31	I-110 north (SR 8A)	I-110 exit 2
Escambia	Pensacola	17.717	28.513	SR 291 south (Dr. Martin Luther King Drive / Alcaniz Street)	
Escambia	Pensacola	17.790	28.630	SR 291 north (North Davis Street)	
Escambia	Pensacola	18.020	29.000	US 98 east (North 9th Avenue / SR 289) – Beaches, Gulf Breeze, Panama City	East end of US 98 overlap
Escambia	Pensacola	19.444	31.292	SR 296 west (Perry Avenue)	
Escambia	Pensacola	24.703	39.756	SR 742 west (Creighton Road)	
Escambia	Ferry Pass	25.89	41.67	I-10 (SR 8) – Mobile, Tallahassee	I-10 exit 17
Escambia	Ferry Pass	27.175	43.734	CR 290 west (Olive Road) – Airport	
Escambia	Riverview	29.242	47.060	US 90 Alt. west (Davis Highway / SR 10) – Pensacola	East end of SR 10A overlap; west end of SR 10 overlap
Escambia River		29.904	48.126	Bridge	
Santa Rosa		32.932	52.999	CR 197A north (Woodbine Road) – Jay, Chumuckla	
Santa Rosa		33.060	53.205	CR 191A east (Diamond Street)	
Santa Rosa	Pace	33.922	54.592	CR 197 (Chumuckla Highway / Floridatown Road) – Chumuckla, Jay	
Santa Rosa	Pace	34.729	55.891	CR 197B north (West Spencer Field Road)	
Santa Rosa	Pea Ridge	36.977	59.509	CR 197A south (Bell Lane)	
Santa Rosa		39.208	63.099	SR 281 south (Avalon Boulevard) to I-10 / SR 281 (Garcon Point Bridge) – Avalon Beach	
Santa Rosa	Milton	39.300	63.247	Old Bagdad Highway (CR 191A east) – Bagdad	Eastbound access only
Santa Rosa	Milton	40.908	65.835	SR 89 north (Dogwood Drive) – NAS Whiting Field, Jay	
Santa Rosa	Milton	41.525	66.828	SR 87 north (Stewart Street) – NAS Whiting Field, Brewton, Blackwater River State Forest	West end of SR 87 overlap
Santa Rosa	Milton	42.008	67.605	CR 191 south (Canal Street) to I-10	
Santa Rosa	Milton	42.29	68.06	Bridge over Blackwater River	
Santa Rosa	East Milton	43.109	69.377	CR 89 south (Ward Basin Road)	
Santa Rosa		46.120	74.223	SR 87 south to I-10 / East Milton Road – Holley, Navarre, Santa Rosa Correctional Institution	East end of SR 87 overlap
Okaloosa	Holt	60.561	97.463	CR 189 south (Log Lake Road) to I-10	
Okaloosa	Galliver	63.207	101.722	CR 189 north (Galliver Cutoff) – Baker	
Okaloosa	Milligan	68.386	110.057	SR 4 west – Baker	
Okaloosa		69.425	111.729	CR 4 east (Antioch Road)	
Okaloosa	Crestview	72.670	116.951	SR 85 to I-10 – Laurel Hill, Niceville, Airport	
Okaloosa	Deerland	80.790	130.019	CR 393 north	
Walton		86.214	138.748	SR 285 south to I-10 – Niceville	
Walton	Mossy Head	88.345	142.177	CR 1087 north	
Walton	DeFuniak Springs	98.366	158.305	US 331 north (SR 187) – Paxton	West end of US 331 overlap
Walton	DeFuniak Springs	100.249	161.335	US 331 south (SR 83) to I-10 – Freeport, Beaches	East end of US 331 overlap; west end of SR 83 overlap
Walton	DeFuniak Springs	100.552	161.823	SR 83 north (9th Street) – Glendale, Samson, Walton Correctional Institution	East end of SR 83 overlap
Walton	Koerber	103.298	166.242	CR 183 north (Kidd Road)	
Walton	Argyle	104.946	168.894	CR 183 south	
Walton	Argyle	105.381	169.594	CR 10A east	
Holmes		110.090	177.173	CR 10A west	
Holmes	Ponce de Leon	111.900	180.086	SR 81 to I-10 – Samson, Bruce	
Holmes	Ponce de Leon	112.134	180.462	CR 181A south – Ponce de Leon Springs State Park	
Holmes	Ponce de Leon	112.972	181.811	CR 10A east	
Holmes	Westville	118.242	190.292	CR 179A north / CR 181 south	
Choctawhatchee River		119.494	192.307	George L. Dickerson Bridge	
Washington	Caryville	120.735	194.304	CR 279 south (Waits Avenue) to I-10	
Washington	Caryville	121.226	195.094	CR 179 north (Wrights Creek Road)	
Holmes	Bonifay	128.649	207.040	CR 173 south (McGee Road)	
Holmes	Bonifay	128.916	207.470	SR 79 (Waukesha Street) to I-10 – Esto, Vernon	
Washington		135.784	218.523	SR 277 south – Vernon	
Washington	Chipley	137.517	221.312	SR 77 (Main Street) to I-10 – Wausau, Graceville, Falling Waters State Park	
Jackson		144.872	233.149	CR 195 south (Sapp Road)	
Jackson	Cottondale	147.186	236.873	US 231 (Main Street / SR 75) to I-10 – Campbellton, Alford	
Jackson		153.192	246.539	Heritage Road (CR 10A east)	
Jackson	Marianna	154.473	248.600	SR 73 north to US 231 north – Campbellton, Dothan	West end of SR 73 overlap
Jackson	Marianna	154.892	249.275	SR 276 west (Penn Avenue) to I-10	
Jackson	Marianna	156.484	251.837	SR 73 south / SR 166 north (Jefferson Street) – Florida Caverns State Park, Chipola College	East end of SR 73 overlap
Jackson		157.933	254.169	SR 71 north – Greenwood, Airport, Federal Correctional Institution	West end of SR 71 overlap
Jackson		159.575	256.811	SR 71 south to I-10 – Altha, Blountstown	East end of SR 71 overlap
Jackson	Cypress	166.460	267.891	CR 275 south (Church Street)	
Jackson	Grand Ridge	169.992	273.576	SR 69 (Porter Avenue) to I-10 – Two Egg, Blountstown	
Jackson		172.768	278.043	CR 69A (Inwood Road / El Bethel Church Road)	
Jackson		174.482	280.802	CR 10A east (Keevers Road)	
Jackson	Sneads	175.331	282.168	CR 271 north (River Road) – Three Rivers State Park	
Jackson	Sneads	175.753	282.847	CR 286 south (Gloster Avenue) to I-10	
Jackson	Sneads	176.744	284.442	CR 10A west (Old Spanish Trail)	
Jackson		178.219	286.816	CR 271 south (Gulf Power Road)	
Apalachicola River		180.149	289.922	Victory Bridge	
Gadsden	Chattahoochee	180.956	291.220	To I-10 / Main Street (CR 269 south) – Torreya State Park	
Gadsden		184.155	296.369	CR 269A north (Faceville Road) to SR 97 – Bainbridge	
Gadsden	Oak Grove	187.772	302.190	CR 379B north (Smithtown Road)	
Gadsden	Mount Pleasant	190.978	307.349	CR 379 (Mount Pleasant Road)	
Gadsden	Gretna	194.748	313.417	CR 268 (Hardaway Highway / Church Street)	
Gadsden	Gretna	195.476	314.588	CR 270A (M.L. King Boulevard / Luten Road)	
Gadsden	Douglas City	196.829	316.766	SR 12 west to I-10 – Greensboro	West end of SR 12 overlap
Gadsden		198.706	319.786	CR 274 west (Ben Bostick Road)	
Gadsden	Quincy	199.998	321.866	SR 267 south (Pat Thomas Parkway / CR 268 west) to I-10	West end of SR 267 overlap
Gadsden	Quincy	200.841	323.222	SR 267 north / CR 268 east (Adams Street) – Gadsden Technical Institute	East end of SR 267 overlap
Gadsden	Quincy	200.912	323.337	CR 65 north (Madison Street)	Former SR 12 east
Gadsden	Quincy	202.915	326.560	SR 12 east / SR 269 north (Ralph Strong Road)	East end of SR 12 overlap; southern terminus of SR 269
Gadsden		210.685	339.065	CR 159 north	
Gadsden	Midway	210.790	339.234	CR 268 west	
Gadsden	Midway	212.88	342.60	I-10 (SR 8) – Lake City, Pensacola	I-10 exit 192
Leon		214.843	345.756	CR 1585 south (Geddie Road)	
Leon		216.047	347.694	CR 1583 south (Barineau Road)	
Leon		216.838	348.967	CR 1581 south (Aenon Church Road)	
Leon	Tallahassee	217.648	350.271	SR 263 (Capital Circle) to I-10 / SR 20 – Civic Center, Tallahassee Museum of History and Natural Science, Airport	
Leon	Tallahassee	218.654	351.890	SR 20 west (Blountstown Highway) – Regional Airport, Panama City, Hosford	West end of SR 20 overlap
Leon	Tallahassee	221.745	356.864	North Woodward Avenue	Former SR 157
Leon	Tallahassee	222.809	358.576	US 27 / SR 61 (North Monroe Street / SR 20 east)	East end of SR 20 overlap
Leon	Tallahassee	222.874	358.681	CR 1559 south (North Calhoun Street)	
Leon	Tallahassee	222.949	358.802	CR 1557 north (North Gadsden Street)	
Leon	Tallahassee	223.025	358.924	CR 146 east (North Meridian Street)	
Leon	Tallahassee	223.318	359.395	CR 1555 south (Franklin Boulevard)	
Leon	Tallahassee	223.937	360.392	SR 265 (Magnolia Drive) to US 27	
Leon	Tallahassee	226.165	363.977	US 319 (Capital Circle Northeast / SR 261) to I-10 – Thomasville, Crawfordville, Regional Airport	
Leon		227.015	365.345	CR 1568 east (Buck Lake Road)	
Leon		227.320	365.836	CR 0353 north (Dempsey Mayo Road)	
Leon		228.513	367.756	CR 0351 north (Edenfield Road)	
Leon		229.096	368.694	CR 1553 north (Pedrick Road)	
Leon		229.791	369.813	CR 349 north (Thornton Road)	
Leon	Tallahassee	230.67	371.23	I-10 (SR 8) – Pensacola, Lake City, Civic Center	I-10 exit 209
Leon	Gardner	232.687	374.473	CR 345 north (Crump Road) / CR 1543 south (Chaires Cross Road)	
Leon	Baum	235.861	379.581	CR 348 (Baum Road)	
Leon		236.828	381.138	CR 1541 south (Jefferson Road)	
Leon		237.641	382.446	CR 59 north (Veterans Memorial Drive) – Miccosukee	
Leon		239.508	385.451	SR 59 south / CR 142 east--or north?-- (Old Magnolia Road) to I-10 / US 27 / US 98 – Lloyd	
Jefferson		246.491	396.689	CR 158A west (Old Lloyd Road)	
Jefferson	Monticello	248.886	400.543	US 19 (Jefferson Street / SR 57) to I-10 – Thomasville, Capps, St. Petersburg	Traffic circle around Jefferson County Courthouse
Jefferson		249.961	402.273	CR 146 east (St. Margaret's Church Road) – Ashville	
Jefferson		256.523	412.834	CR 257 (South Salt) – Aucilla	
Madison	Greenville	264.466	425.617	US 221 north (SR 55) – Quitman	West end of US 221 / SR 55 overlap
Madison	Greenville	264.778	426.119	US 221 south (SR 55) to I-10 – Perry	East end of US 221 / SR 55 overlap
Madison		266.602	429.054	CR 150 east (Northwest Lovett Road)	
Madison	Madison	278.045	447.470	CR 360A west (M.L. King Jr. Drive)	
Madison	Madison	278.283	447.853	SR 53 north (Washington Street)	West end of SR 53 overlap
Madison	Madison	278.634	448.418	SR 53 south / SR 145 north (Duval Street) to I-10	East end of SR 53 overlap
Madison		280.617	451.609	SR 6 east – Jasper	
Madison	Lee	286.424	460.955	CR 255 to I-10	
Madison		292.065	470.033	Northeast Myrrh Street (CR 141 north)	
Suwannee	Ellaville	295.299	475.238	CR 132 east – Suwannee River State Park, Boys Ranch	
Suwannee		300.37	483.40	I-10 (SR 8) – Jacksonville, Tallahassee	I-10 exit 275
Suwannee	Live Oak	307.004	494.075	Walker Avenue (truck route south)	
Suwannee	Live Oak	307.228	494.436	To I-10 / Houston Avenue (CR 249 north / truck route north) – Boys Ranch	
Suwannee	Live Oak	307.515	494.897	US 129 (Ohio Avenue / Dr. M.L. King Jr. Avenue / SR 51) to I-10 – Jasper, Branford, Dowling Park	
Suwannee		309.207	497.620	CR 10A west	
Suwannee		309.524	498.131	CR 49 south – Trenton	
Suwannee		313.512	504.549	CR 417 north	
Suwannee		317.550	511.047	CR 10A east	
Suwannee		318.545	512.648	CR 137 to I-10 – Wellborn, White Springs	
Suwannee		320.537	515.854	CR 10A west	
Columbia		321.210	516.937	CR 252A south (Southwest Koonville Avenue)	
Columbia		322.973	519.775	CR 135 north (Northwest Noegel Road)	
Columbia	Lake City	326.097	524.802	Southwest Pinemount Road (CR 252 west)	
Columbia	Lake City	326.914	526.117	CR 252B south	
Columbia	Lake City	327.426	526.941	I-75 (SR 93) – Valdosta, Alachua	I-75 exit 427
Columbia	Lake City	328.750	529.072	SR 247 south – Branford	
Columbia	Lake City	329.876	530.884	SR 10A east (Southwest Baya Drive) – VA Hospital, Airport	No left turn westbound
Columbia	Lake City	330.207	531.417	Northwest Lake Jeffery Road (CR 129 north) – National Guard Armory	
Columbia	Lake City	330.631	532.099	US 41 / US 441 Truck (Main Boulevard / SR 25 / SR 47 south / SR 100 west) – Jasper, High Springs	West end of SR 47 / SR 100 overlap
Columbia	Lake City	330.772	532.326	US 441 (Marion Avenue / SR 25A south / SR 47 north) – Downtown Lake City	East end of SR 47 overlap
Columbia	Watertown	332.476	535.068	Southeast Country Club Road (CR 133 south)	
Columbia	Watertown	332.794	535.580	SR 100 east to I-10 / Northeast Bascom Norris Drive (CR 100A west) – Lake Butler	East end of SR 100 overlap
Columbia	Watertown	333.197	536.229	SR 10A (Southeast Baya Drive) to SR 100 east	
Columbia	Watertown	333.432	536.607	CR 245	
Baker	Olustee	343.371	552.602	CR 231 – Lake Butler, Olustee Beach	
Baker		344.504	554.425	CR 250A north	
Baker		351.24	565.27	I-10 (SR 8) – Jacksonville, Lake City	I-10 exit 324
Baker	Sanderson	353.256	568.510	CR 229 north	
Baker	Sanderson	353.327	568.625	CR 127 north / CR 229 south to I-10	
Baker		357.093	574.685	CR 139 north – Margaretta	
Baker		358.376	576.750	CR 123 south (Smokey Road)	
Baker		359.400	578.398	CR 139B north	
Baker	Glen St. Mary	360.268	579.795	CR 125 (Glen Avenue) to I-10 – Taylor, Lake Butler	
Baker	Macclenny	361.950	582.502	CR 23A (Lowder Street)	
Baker	Macclenny	362.527	583.431	SR 121 (Sixth Street) to I-10 – St. George, Raiford	
Baker	Macclenny	362.620	583.580	SR 228 east / CR 228 west (Fifth Street) to I-10	
Nassau	No major junctions				
Duval		369.674	594.933	CR 121 north (Brandy Branch Road)	
Duval	Baldwin	371.160	597.324	US 301 south (SR 200) to I-10 – Lawtey, Starke, Ocala	West end of US 301 / SR 200 overlap
Duval	Baldwin	371.814	598.377	US 301 north (SR 200) to I-95 – Callahan	East end of US 301 / SR 200 overlap
Duval	Baldwin	372.164	598.940	Yellow Water Road (CR 217 south)	
Duval	Otis	376.494	605.908	Otis Road (CR 119 north)	
Duval	Otis	377.220	607.077	SR 23 south to I-10	
Duval	Whitehouse	379.267	610.371	To I-10 / Chaffee Road (CR 115C south)	
Duval		381.807	614.459	Jones Road (CR 117 north)	
Duval	Jacksonville	385.103	619.763	SR 103 south (Lane Avenue) to I-10	
Duval	Jacksonville	386.384	621.825	SR 111 (Edgewood Avenue) to I-10	
Duval	Jacksonville	390.07	627.76	I-95 (US 17 south / SR 9 / SR 15 / SR 228 west)	I-95 exit 353B
Duval	Jacksonville	390.945	629.165	US 1 north / SR 228 west (North Ocean Street / SR 5 north)	West end of US 1 / SR 5 / SR 228 overlap
Duval	Jacksonville	391.210	629.591	To I-10 / I-95 north / Adams Street	
Duval	Jacksonville	391.266	629.682	SR 228 east (Forsyth Street)	West end of SR 228 overlap
Duval	Jacksonville	391.319	629.767	Bay Street – Performing Arts Center, Convention Center	Former US 17 south / SR 15 south / SR 228 west
Duval	Jacksonville	391.39	629.88	Newman Street – County Court House	Interchange; westbound exit and eastbound entrance
Duval	Jacksonville	391.61	630.24	Main Street Bridge over St. Johns River	
Duval	Jacksonville	392.021	630.897	SR 13 north (Prudential Drive) to I-95 (SR 10 east)	East end of SR 10 overlap; west end of SR 13 overlap
Duval	Jacksonville	392.309	631.360	SR 13 south (Hendricks Avenue)	East end of SR 13 overlap
Duval	Jacksonville	393.159	632.728	US 1 south (Kings Avenue / SR 5)	East end of US 1 / SR 5 overlap
Duval	Jacksonville	393.25	632.87	I-95 north (SR 9 north / SR 10 west) to I-10 – Downtown Jacksonville	Interchange; westbound exit and eastbound entrance; west end of SR 10 overlap
Duval	Jacksonville	393.865	633.864	To I-95 / Spring Park Road	Eastbound access only
Duval	Jacksonville	393.897	633.916	SR 10 east / US 90 Alt. east (Atlantic Boulevard)	Interchange; eastbound exit and westbound entrance; east end of SR 10 overlap; west end of SR 212 overlap
Duval	Jacksonville	395.29	636.16	US 1 Alt. (Emerson Street / SR 228A) to I-95 / Atlantic Boulevard – Downtown Jacksonville	Interchange
Duval	Jacksonville	396.081	637.431	SR 109 (University Boulevard) to I-95	
Duval	Jacksonville	397.22	639.26	Atlantic Boulevard – Downtown Jacksonville (SR 228 west)	Interchange; westbound exit and eastbound entrance
Duval	Jacksonville	398.682	641.616	SR 115 / US 90 Alt. west (Southside Boulevard)	Interchange
Duval	Jacksonville	400.92	645.22	I-295 (SR 9A) – University of North Florida, International Airport	I-295 exit 51
Duval	Jacksonville	402.88	648.37	Kernan Boulevard – University of North Florida	Interchange
Duval	Jacksonville	405.944	653.304	San Pablo Road (CR 101A north)	
Duval		406.93	654.89	B.B. McCormick Bridge over San Pablo River (Intracoastal Waterway)	
Duval	Jacksonville Beach	408.723	657.776	SR A1A (3rd Street / CR 212 east)	Eastern terminus of US 90; Beach Boulevard continues to the east as unsigned CR 212.
1.000 mi = 1.609 km; 1.000 km = 0.621 mi: Concurrency terminus

== Related routes ==
- ALT U.S. 90 - Pensacola, Florida
- ALT U.S. 90 - Quincy, Florida to Tallahassee, Florida
- ALT U.S. 90 - Jacksonville, Florida

== See also ==
U.S. Route 90
Previous state: Alabama	Florida	Next state: Terminus
