= Museum of Local History (Milton, Florida) =

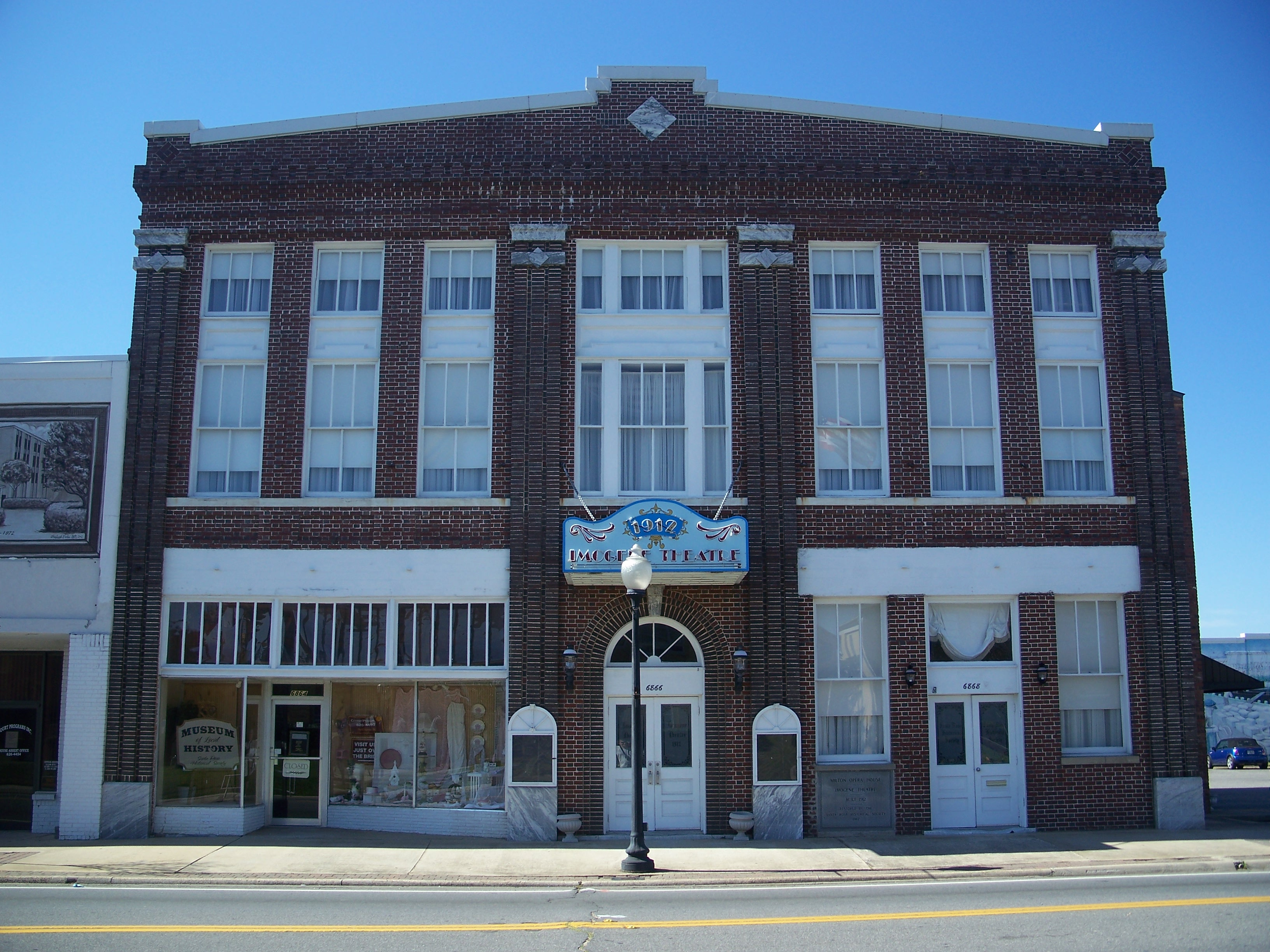

- Location within Florida
- Established: 1988
- Location: 6866 Caroline St; Milton, Florida
- Coordinates: 30.6231°N 87.0366°W
- Type: History museum
- Website: Museum of Local History

The Museum of Local History is operated by the Santa Rosa Historical Society. The museum exhibits depict the history of industry and fashion in Santa Rosa County. It is part of the Milton Historic District, which is listed on the National Register of Historic Places. The Museum is currently closed due to relocation. Please visit https://wfrm.org/ in the meantime.
