= Deerland, Florida =

Unincorporated community in Florida, U.S.

Coordinates: 30°45′06″N 86°26′09″W

Deerland is an unincorporated community in Okaloosa County, Florida, United States.
