= Milton Historic District (Milton, Florida) =

Historic district in Florida, United States

- U.S. National Register of Historic Places
- U.S. Historic district
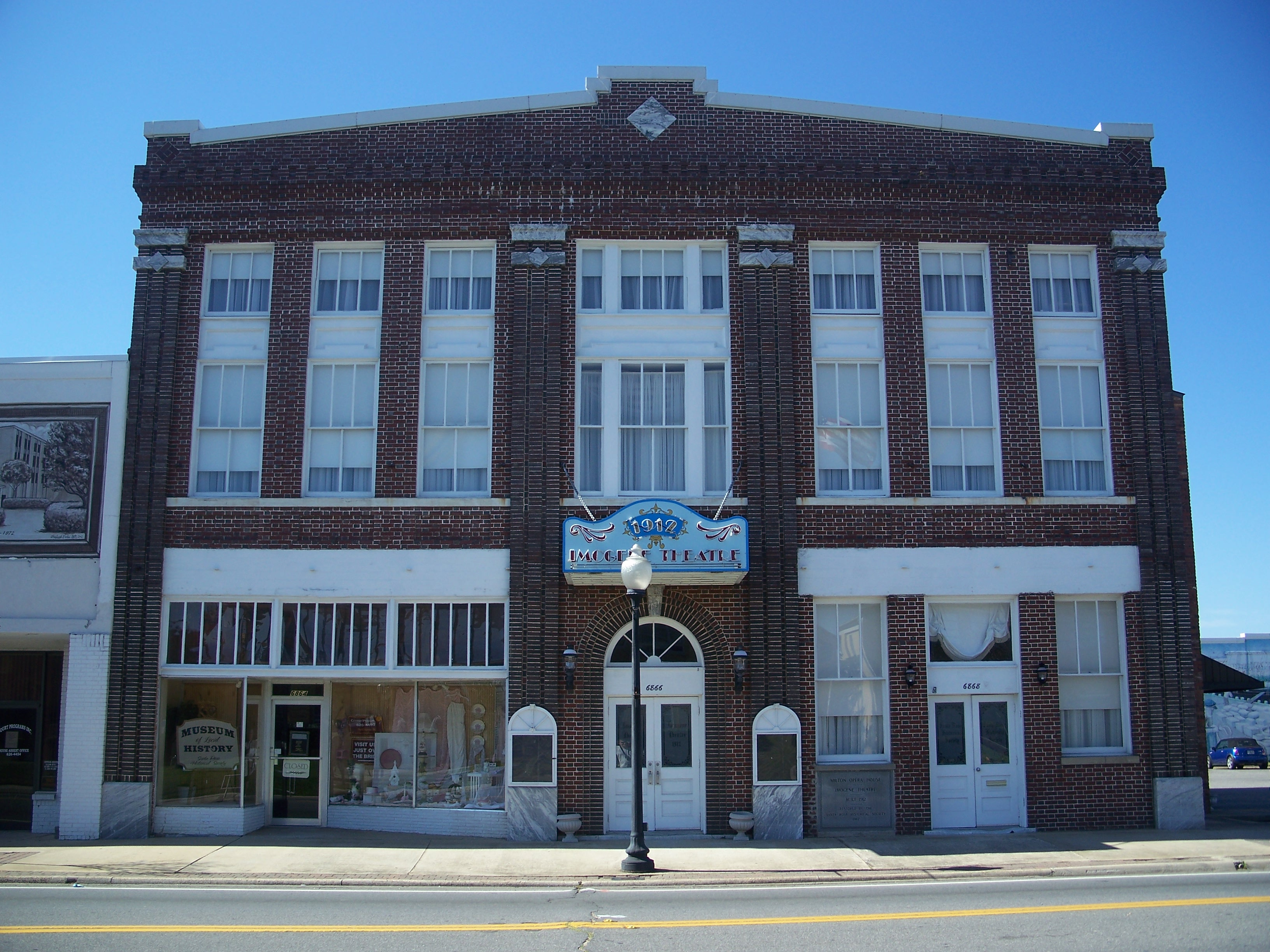
- Old Imogene Theatre

- Location within Florida Location within the United States
- Location: Milton, Florida
- Coordinates: 30°37′18″N 87°2′21″W
- Area: 1,400 acres (5.7 km^{2})
- NRHP reference No.: 87001944
- Added to NRHP: November 12, 1987

The Milton Historic District is a U.S. historic district (designated as such on November 12, 1987) located in Milton, Florida. The district is along US 90 at the Blackwater River, bounded by Berryhill, Willing, Hill, Canal, Margaret, & Susan Streets. It contains 117 historic buildings.

== Fire in 2009 ==
On the night of January 6 a fire occurred in the district and spread along US 90 between Canal Street and Willing Street. It was brought under control, and caused an estimated two million dollars in damage.

== Gallery ==
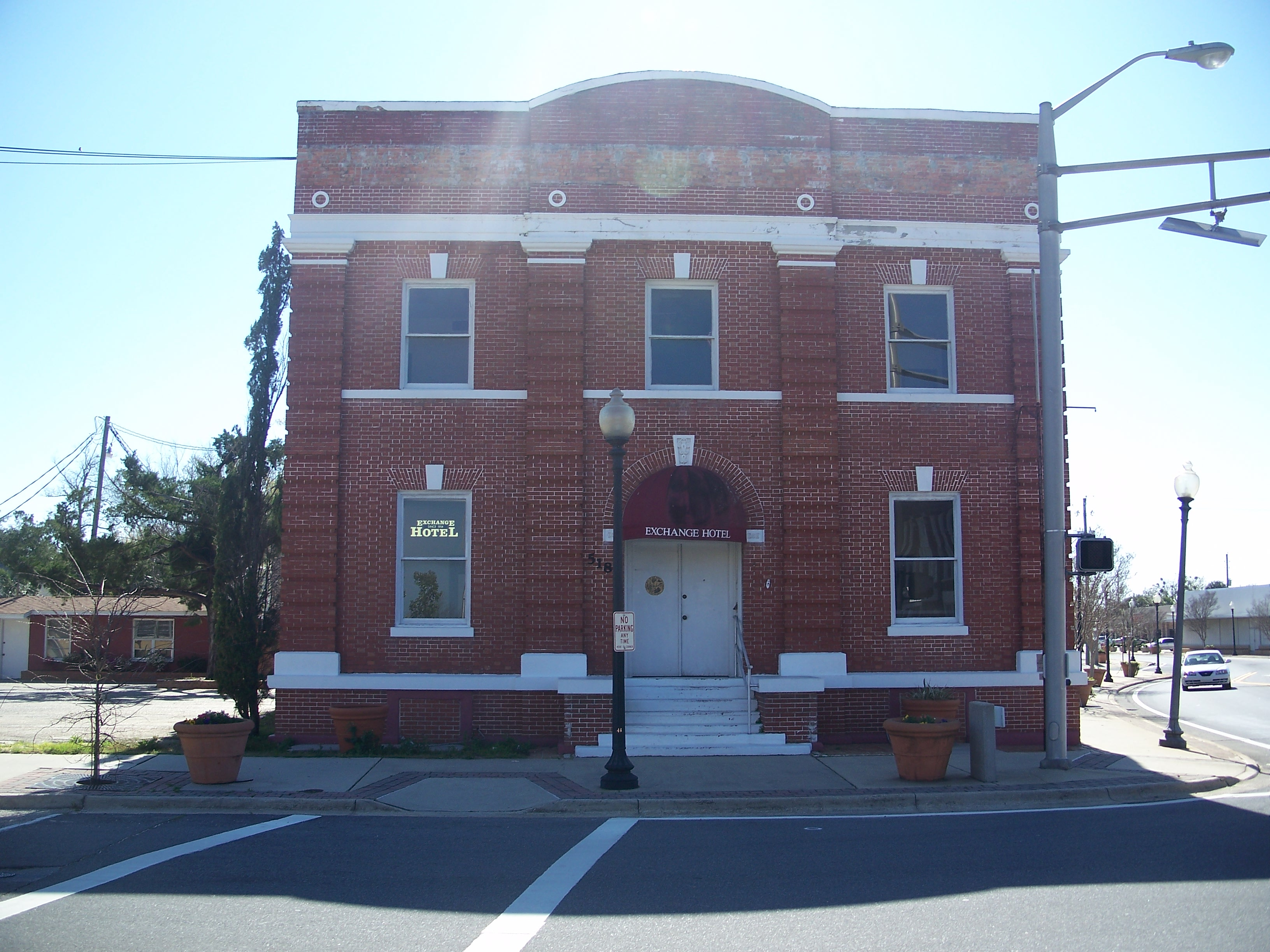
Exchange Hotel

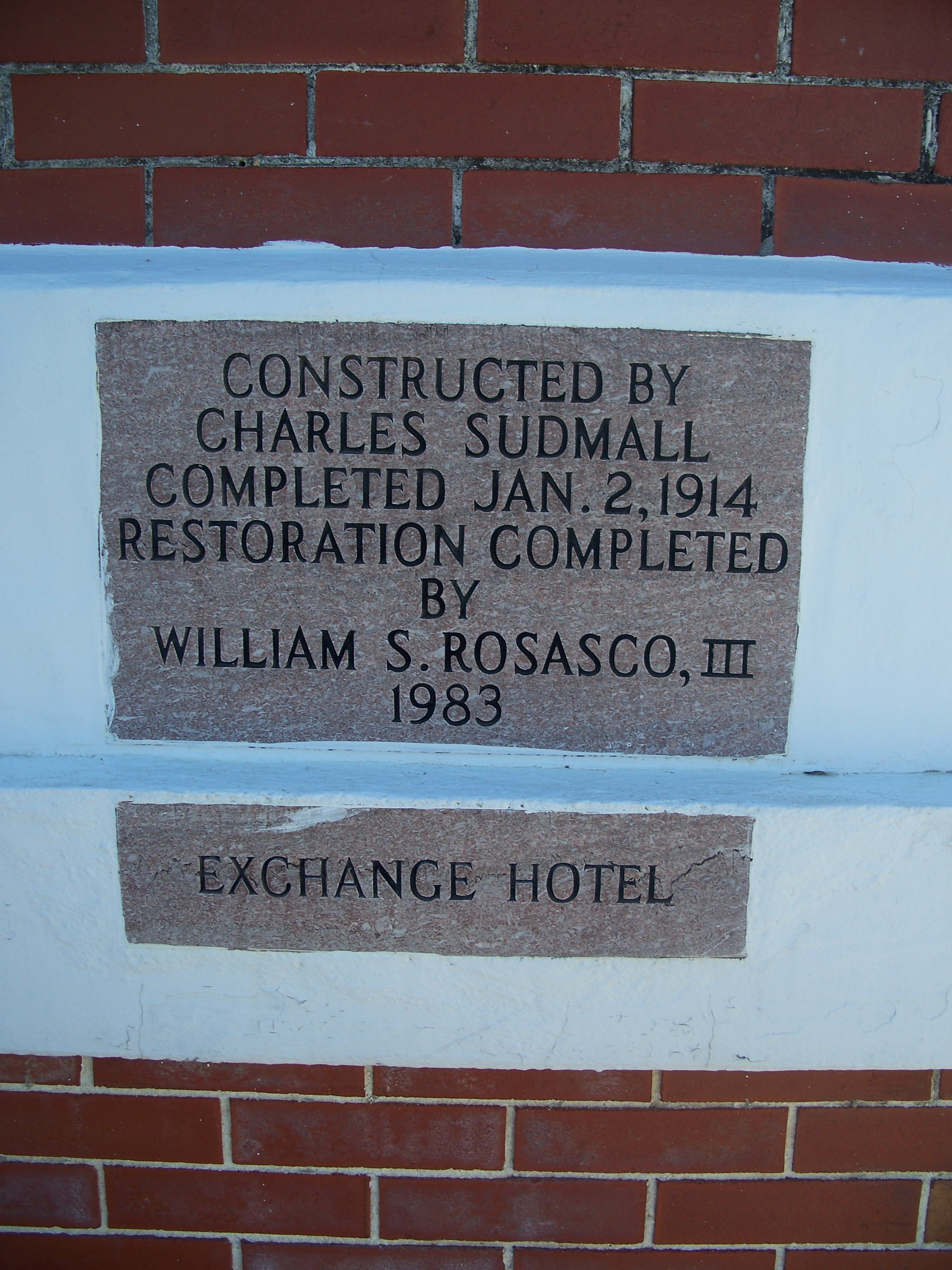
Commemorative stone on the Exchange Hotel

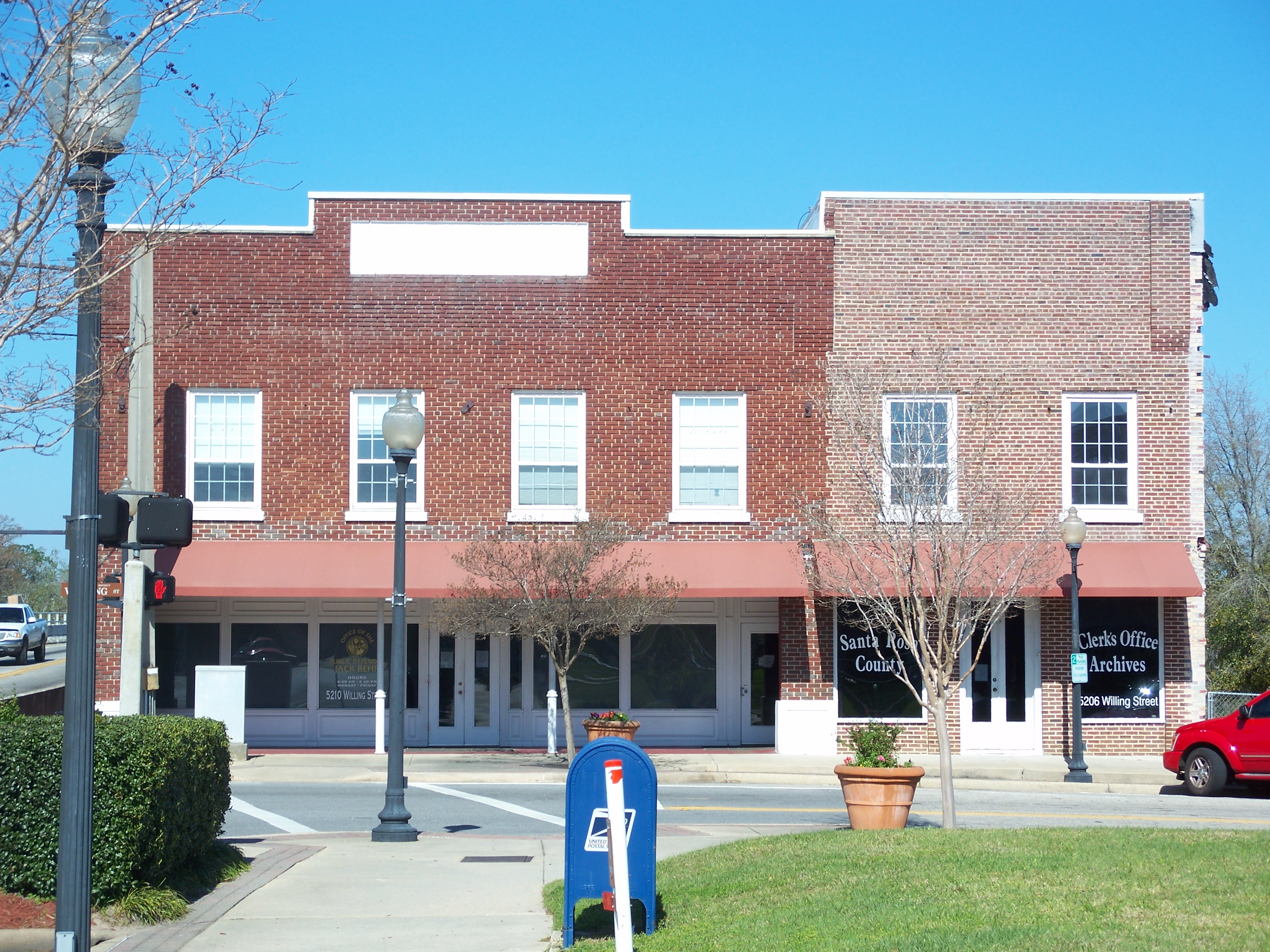
Building in the district
