= Washington County Public Library =

Coordinates: 30.77719°N 85.55350°W

The Washington County Public Library (WCPL) is a public library system located in Washington County, Florida, United States. The library system has four locations: a main library in Chipley and three branches in Vernon, Sunny Hills, and Wausau.

The Washington County Public Library is a member of the Panhandle Public Library Cooperative System (PPLCS) and Panhandle Access Library Network (PLAN), giving library patrons access to over a million items, with shared circulation among Holmes, Calhoun, and Jackson counties.

== History ==
In 1934 the Chipley Woman’s Club, with the help of donated books and volunteer staff, opened a public library in a small building at the corner of East Church Street and North 6th Street in Chipley. The Club held a sponsored dinner in 1939 to raise matching funds to aid in purchasing more books. In 1959 the Library was moved to the upstairs of Old City Hall, where its hours of operation were 2:30 pm – 4:00 pm, twice a week. In August 1963, the City of Chipley offered the Club another building to house the Library, located at the corner of Highway 90 and Highway 77. This new library opened in 1964, and was staffed using funds from the County's contribution to a regional library system. The regional library system also provided a bookmobile, which made stops in Greenhead, Wausau, Vernon, Hinson Crossroads, New Hope, Ebro, and Caryville.

The Library again outgrew their facility, and was relocated to the recently vacated City Hall, located at the corner of 5th and Church Street, in 1980. The Library remained at this location until 2003, when it was once again moved, this time to a new building that was built on Highway 90.

== Branches ==
=== Washington County Public Library ===
The Washington County Public Library, also known as the Chipley Library, is located at 1444 Jackson Avenue in Chipley, Florida.

The Chipley Library suffered severe flooding during Hurricane Sally, taking on nearly eight inches of water and causing the branch to lose nearly all of the books and materials that were located on the bottom shelves. The branch is undergoing renovations, and remains closed until further notice (as of April 2021).

=== Sam Mitchell Public Library ===
The Sam Mitchell Public Library is located at 3731 Roche Avenue in Vernon, Florida. This branch was built in 1993, with the assistance of Representative Sam Mitchell.

=== Wausau Public Library ===
The Wausau Public Library is located at 1607 Second Avenue in Wausau, Florida.

=== Sunny Hills Public Library ===
The Sunny Hills Public Library is located at 4083 Challenger Boulevard in Chipley, Florida.
