= Moss Hill Church =

Historic church in Florida, United States

- U.S. National Register of Historic Places
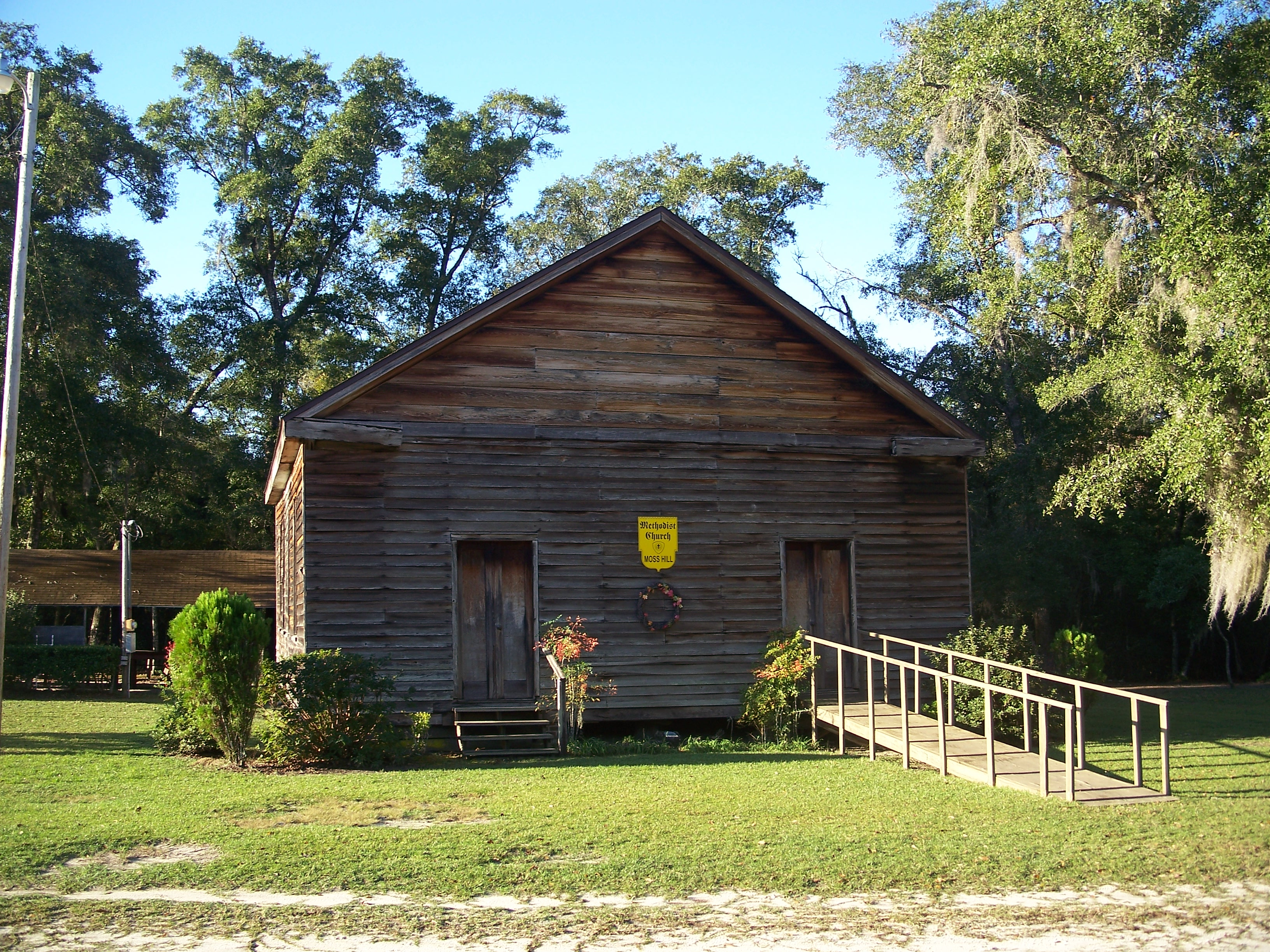

- Location within Florida Location within the United States
- Nearest city: Vernon
- Coordinates: 30°35′2″N 85°40′40″W
- Built: 1857
- NRHP reference No.: 83003554
- Added to NRHP: November 7, 1983

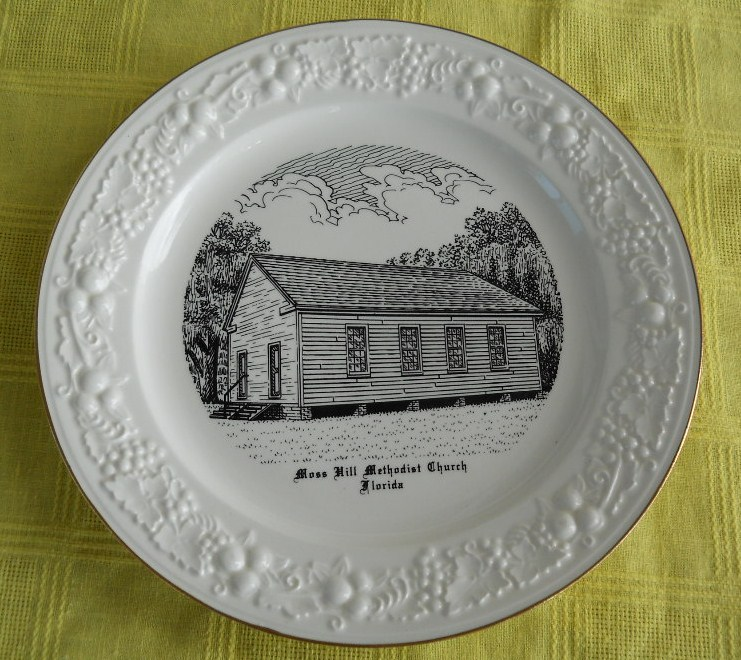
Exterior of Moss Hill Church

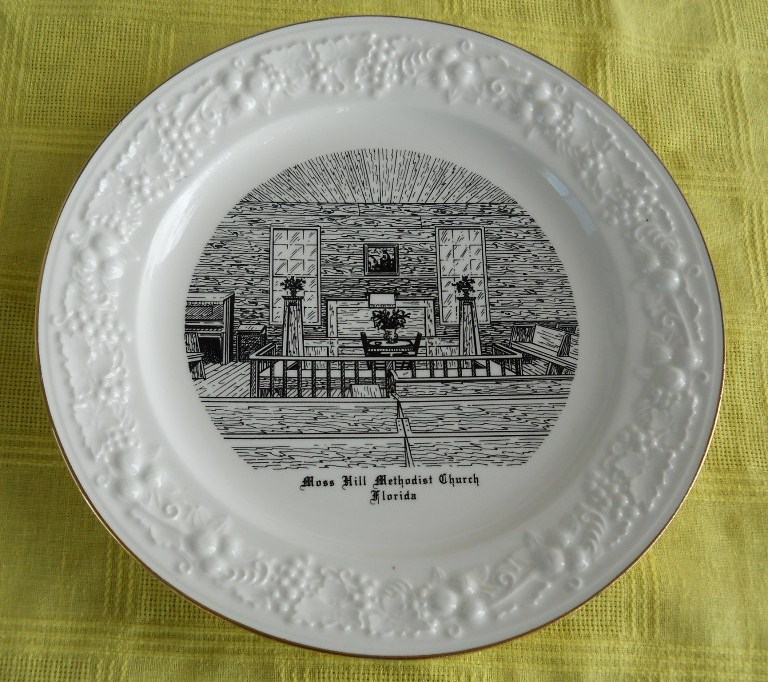
Interior of Moss Hill Church

The Moss Hill Church, also known as the Moss Hill Methodist Church and now the Moss Hill United Methodist Church, is located near Vernon in Washington County, Florida, in the United States. The Holmes Valley Methodist Mission was established in 1821–1825. The church was built in 1857.

Moss Hill Church is listed in the National Register of Historic Places of the United States.

== Construction ==
The construction of the church is from heart of pine wood (the center of a pine tree, saturated with sap). This wood also is known in the West Florida dialect as "Fat Lighter". The term "fat" refers to the saturated sap. The term "Lighter" refers to "lighting" or "burning"; as small spikes of this special wood can be used to begin combustion. Upon aging, the wood becomes very strong, impervious to termites or water damage.

The altar area of the church was constructed by the Roche Family, early settlers to Holmes Valley, Florida.

The church is still in existence today.
