= List of United States tornadoes from January to February 2000 =

This is a list of all tornadoes that were confirmed by local offices of the National Weather Service in the United States from January to February 2000.

== January ==
Confirmed tornadoes by Fujita rating
FU	F0	F1	F2	F3	F4	F5	Total
0	3	9	1	3	0	0	16

=== January 3 event ===
List of confirmed tornadoes – January 3, 2000 (Note: All dates are based on the local time zone where the tornado touched down; however, all times are in Coordinated Universal Time for consistency.)
F#	Location	County / Parish	State	Start Coord.	Time (UTC)	Path length	Max width	Damage	Summary
F1	S of Jordan	Baxter, Izard	AR	36.22°N 92.18°W	12:22–12:30	4.8 mi (7.7 km)	40 yd (37 m)	Unknown	A tornado destroyed a travel trailer and blew over two semitrailers, one landing on another semi. North of Dolph two turkey houses were heavily damaged along with several trees being downed.
F1	SW of Wiseman	Izard	AR	36.22°N 91.83°W	12:46–12:48	1.8 mi (2.9 km)	40 yd (37 m)	Unknown	Nine houses sustained roof damage in and near Wiseman, mostly from falling trees and limbs. The tornado also broke windows and removed shingles from several buildings including the community center.
F1	WNW of Agnos	Fulton	AR	36.25°N 91.7°W	12:50–12:53	2 mi (3.2 km)	40 yd (37 m)	Unknown	A few barns and a large shed were destroyed and few houses lost shingles.
F1	WSW of Fryatt	Fulton	AR	36.47°N 91.65°W	12:55–13:00	3.1 mi (5.0 km)	40 yd (37 m)	Unknown	A couple hundred trees were downed along AR 9. One house badly damaged by falling trees. A barn had the roof blown off and some outbuildings were damaged.
F1	SW of Schlater	Leflore	MS	33.63°N 90.37°W	18:15–18:18	3.0 mi (4.8 km)	150 yd (140 m)	$45,000	Numerous trees were snapped or downed. A mobile home and barn sustained significant damage.
F1	N of Fredericksburg	Washington	IN	38.47°N 86.18°W	19:05	0.3 mi (480 m)	50 yd (46 m)	$47,000	A mobile home was destroyed while another was shifted on its foundation. House and barn received roof damage.
F3	E of Water Vly	Yalobusha, Lafayette, Union	MS	34.17°N 89.55°W	19:30–20:10	43.2 mi (69.5 km)	600 yd (550 m)	$450,000	This tornado developed just south of MS 315 and moved northeast. A house was blown three feet (0.91 m) off of its foundation with only the west facing wall left standing. Two mobile houses were destroyed while nine other houses and a barn sustained moderate to extensive damage. In Lafayette County a house was lifted off its foundation with the back portion blown out. One occupant was injured. Nearby, a house under construction was severely damaged and other constructed houses sustained light damages. The tornado continued northeast knocking down trees and causing spotty damage in the towns of Denmark and Lafayette Springs. In Pinedale a newly constructed brick and vinyl sided house was completely destroyed with debris being scattered 400 yards (370 m). A nearby pickup truck was tossed 20 yards (18 m). Trees with diameters of 2 to 3 feet (0.61 to 0.91 m) were uprooted. In the town of Enterprise a mobile home was destroyed and a conventional house sustained extensive damage. The West Union School received minor roof damage and blown out windows. Two mobile homes were destroyed and one flipped on its side in Myrtle. Over 60 houses were damaged in Union County. The tornado lifted at the Union/Tippah county line.
F3	Crayne	Crittenden, Webster	KY	37.27°N 88.08°W	21:08–21:32	24 mi (39 km)	440 yd (400 m)	$7,400,000	The tornado started in the rural area of South Crittenden County. Aerial surveys found 85 houses, 5-10 business, and 50-85 barns and outhouses were destroyed or sustained heavy damages. Three people sustained minor injuries in Crittenden County. In Webster County the community of Diamond received extensive damages. In response to the tornado the Counties of Crittenden and Webster were declared federal disaster areas with 35 national guard personal deployed to aid in assessment and security. An emergency center was opened to accommodate 25 homeless people. The tornado had estimated winds of 160 mph (260 km/h).
F3	Rome to Owensboro	Daviess	KY	37.72°N 87.18°W	22:06–22:12	7 mi (11 km)	880 yd (800 m)	$64,000,000	This intense tornado started in the community of Rome before entering Owensboro. The tornado tracked through densely populated residential and commercial areas. Some notable structures impacted included Apollo High School, Kentucky Wesleyan College, and the Winn-Dixie Store. Twelve buildings were damaged at Kentucky Wesleyan College, amounting to $5 million. Many vehicles were tossed by the tornado and the utility line damage took ten days to repair. About 1,200 structures sustained damage, of those 101 were destroyed and 573 received major damage. 17 people received minor injuries. One person had critical injuries. In response, the town of Owensboro was declared a disaster area, an emergency shelter was set up to house 1,500 people, and schools in Owensboro were closed for a week. The tornado had estimated winds of 180 mph (290 km/h).
F2	SW of Garlandville	Jasper, Newton	MS	32.18°N 89.15°W	23:29–23:36	6.0 mi (9.7 km)	300 yd (270 m)	$165,000	A cinder-block convenience store was nearly demolished in Jasper County. One house had its roof removed and placed 50 yards (46 m) away. A mobile home was destroyed after being lifted and tossed 50 yards (46 m) into adjacent woods. Several barns and outhouses also were destroyed or sustained major damage. Moving northeast the weakening tornado downed several hundred trees and damaging a few more barns until it lifted in Newton County.
F0	E of Woodville	Wilkinson	MS	31.10°N 91.27°W	00:21	0.1 mi (160 m)	25 yd (23 m)	$500	Brief and weak tornado touched down along MS 24 downing several trees.

=== January 9 event ===
List of confirmed tornadoes – January 9, 2000
F#	Location	County / Parish	State	Start Coord.	Time (UTC)	Path length	Max width	Damage	Summary
F0	SSW of Montgomery	Montgomery	AL	32.30°N 86.33°W	21:56	0.1 mi (160 m)	20 yd (18 m)	$20,000	A brief tornado spun and flipped over a vehicle south of exit 167 on I-65. The motorist sustained minor injuries, and the vehicle was totaled.
F0	S of Midway	Bullock	AL	32.05°N 85.52°W	22:22–22:23	1 mi (1.6 km)	30 yd (27 m)	$0	A weak tornado downed several trees.
F1	Dixons Mills	Marengo	AL	32.05°N 87.78°W	05:05–05:25	6.5 mi (10.5 km)	300 yd (270 m)	$500,000	A tornado touched down just within Marengo County, three miles south of Dixon Mills. It traveled northeast crossing State Highway 10. Most of the damage were to trees until it approached Surginer where two mobile homes were destroyed. A house received major roof damage and another two sustained roof and structure damage. A few barns and outbuildings were also damaged before the tornado lifted.

=== January 16 event ===
List of confirmed tornadoes – January 16, 2000
F#	Location	County / Parish	State	Start Coord.	Time (UTC)	Path length	Max width	Damage	Summary
F1	Dayton	Columbia	WA	46.32°N 118.00°W	17:00	1 mi (1.6 km)	50 yd (46 m)	$100,000	Several witnesses reported a tornado just south of US Highway 12 southwest of Dayton. The tornado damaged the second story of a barn and flipped a mobile home over at the start of the track. Intermediate damage to trees occurred along the Touchet River. In the south side of Dayton an elementary school sustained minor roof damage. A house on the southeast side of Dayton suffered major damage when a large tree fell on it and its chimney collapsed.

=== January 24 event ===
List of confirmed tornadoes – January 24, 2000
F#	Location	County / Parish	State	Start Coord.	Time (UTC)	Path length	Max width	Damage	Summary
F1	Estero	Lee	FL	26.43°N 81.63°W	08:29–08:33	2.5 mi (4.0 km)	75 yd (69 m)	$500,000	This tornado began near the Lee/Collier county line, downing a few trees, damaging a mobile house and two vehicles, and killing two cows. Moving northeast the tornado caused minor damage to three planes and a recreational vehicle in a hangar. A 3,000-gallon water tank was moved over 1,000 yards (910 m), a few pole barns were damaged, and a storage shed was destroyed. The tornado damaged a few more mobile homes, pole barns, and sheds before lifting.

== February ==
Confirmed tornadoes by Fujita rating
FU	F0	F1	F2	F3	F4	F5	Total
0	36	16	2	2	0	0	56

=== February 10 event ===
List of confirmed tornadoes – February 10, 2000
F#	Location	County / Parish	State	Start Coord.	Time (UTC)	Path length	Max width	Damage	Summary
F0	Sparks	Washoe	NV	39.55°N 119.77°W	21:40	0.5 mi (0.80 km)	15 yd (14 m)	Unknown	A tornado was reported by the public and an airplane pilot. Minor damage occurred.

=== February 13 event ===
List of confirmed tornadoes – February 13, 2000
F#	Location	County / Parish	State	Start Coord.	Time (UTC)	Path length	Max width	Damage	Summary
F1	SW of Ada	Montgomery	AL	32.07°N 86.3°W	21:00–21:17	11.4 mi (18.3 km)	300 yd (270 m)	$100,000	The Ramer Manufacturing Plant sustained significant damage, several homes and mobile homes were damaged, and hundreds of trees were uprooted. The tornado was caught on video by a local television meteorologist.
F0	NNW of Downing	Montgomery, Bullock	AL	32.18°N 86.02°W	21:30–21:35	3 mi (4.8 km)	100 yd (91 m)	$18,000	Many trees were snapped or uprooted.
F0	NNW of Fitzpatrick	Bullock, Macon	AL	32.23°N 85.88°W	21:42–21:43	1 mi (1.6 km)	50 yd (46 m)	$10,000	Several trees were uprooted or damaged.
F0	NW of Mayflower	Faulkner	AR	34.97°N 92.45°W	22:52–22:55	2.2 mi (3.5 km)	40 yd (37 m)	Unknown	A weak tornado caused minor damage to a house when it tore a few columns from the front of the building. Two highway signs were bent over. In Paradise Landing, a store had its front windows blown in, a boat dock roof was removed, and several nearby boat houses sustained damage. Trees and power lines were downed along the path.
F2	N of Furlow	Lonoke, Prairie	AR	34.88°N 91.98°W	23:38–00:42	32.7 mi (52.6 km)	100 yd (91 m)	Unknown	This long-lasting tornado first started in west Lonoke County, removing shingles from houses and badly damaging a farm shop. Further east in the Fairview Community a mobile home was destroyed. Four miles south of Woodlawn two small houses and grain bins were destroyed. An abandoned house and a mobile home were destroyed with several other houses sustaining damage. Along the path, numerous vehicles and power poles were damaged. In Lonoke County, two people were injured. After crossing into Prairie County, the tornado damaged several shops and barns in the Center Point Community. In the same area, a mobile home was lifted off its foundation and damaged by a falling tree. The tornado continued into the Wattensaw Wildlife Management Area, causing tree damage as it dissipated.
F1	Nashville	Davidson	TN	36.15°N 86.87°W	00:04–00:15	4.3 mi (6.9 km)	200 yd (180 m)	$500,000	This tornado touched down near Scovel Street and 28th Avenue North. Extensive damage occurred in this area and in a path about a mile to the east-northeast. Two houses received damage from falling trees. At St. Vincent De Paul School, a trailer was destroyed, and an apartment complex on Delta Street sustained roof damage. In total, about 50 houses and 20 businesses received damage with the hardest hit area being from Eight Avenue North to Bordeaux Street. A woman was injured when she wrecked after an interstate sign was thrown onto her car.
F1	SE of Greenhead	Washington	FL	30.47°N 85.62°W	02:15	0.5 mi (0.80 km)	50 yd (46 m)	$300,000	A brief tornado destroyed a house and two farm buildings and damaged a shed.
F1	E of Greenhead	Washington	FL	30.50°N 85.53°W	02:18–02:22	0.5 mi (0.80 km)	50 yd (46 m)	$750,000	The tornado hit the southern and eastern edges of Porter Lake. Two mobile homes were destroyed, along with numerous decks and utility sheds. One boat was capsized while three others were blown into nearby woods.
F1	NE of Bainbridge	Decatur	GA	31.05°N 84.38°W	04:19–04:25	0.2 mi (320 m)	50 yd (46 m)	$1,000,000	Several houses were destroyed, and power lines and trees were downed. One person was injured by flying debris. Decatur County was declared a federal disaster area.
F3	SW of Camilla	Mitchell	GA	31.17°N 84.27°W	04:42–05:03	9.2 mi (14.8 km)	300 yd (270 m)	$22,000,000	11 deaths – This strong tornado went through two major subdivisions and four mobile home parks. 200 houses were destroyed, with another 250 being damaged. South of Camilla, a large trailer plant was destroyed. All the fatalities and 175 injuries occurred in mobile homes. Hundreds of acres of pecan trees were uprooted amounting to $2 million in crop damages. Pine trees and power lines were snapped along the tornado path. In response to this tornado Mitchell County was declared a federal disaster area and several shelters were set up for the homeless.

=== February 14 event ===
All dates are based on the local time zone where the tornado touched down.
F#	Location	County / Parish	State	Start Coord.	Local Time	Path length	Max width	Damage	Summary
F3	SW of Spence to E of Meigs	Grady, Thomas, Mitchell	GA	31.02°N 84.20°W	05:49–06:02	15 mi (24 km)	300 yd (270 m)	$8,000,000	7 deaths – A strong tornado first started in northeast Grady County, destroying 15 houses and damaging numerous others. Six people were killed and fifteen were injured by flying debris. Numerous pecan and pine trees were uprooted, while many power lines were downed. Large losses to farming equipment, trailers, and shelters amounted to $3 million. Eight chicken houses were flattened, killing half a million chickens. The tornado continued into Thomas County inciting more home, utility line, and tree damage. During the final part of the track, the tornado killed a man in his mobile home in southeast Mitchell County. In response to the tornado, Grady County was declared a federal disaster area.
F1	N of Moultrie	Colquitt	GA	31.18°N 83.85°W	06:21–06:27	2 mi (3.2 km)	50 yd (46 m)	$75,000	A house was damaged, and numerous trees and power lines were blown down.
F2	SE of Crosland	Colquitt, Tift	GA	31.32°N 83.63°W	06:39–06:48	6 mi (9.7 km)	200 yd (180 m)	$2,500,000	1 death - This tornado began in far northeast Colquitt County, uprooting trees and downing power poles. Several mobile homes were damage and a woman was killed when a tree and another mobile home were thrown into her home. The tornado continued into Tift County where it destroyed 12 mobile and 8 pre-built houses. Frame homes were damaged, some of which were pushed from their foundations. Ten persons were injured. Many trees and power lines were downed, and a school bus was blown into a house. Both Colquitt and Tift Counties were declared federal disaster areas.
F0	Lenox	Cook	GA	31.27°N 83.47°W	07:30	0.1 mi (160 m)	Unknown	None	A brief tornado was reported by the Cook County Sheriff; it resulted in no damage.
F0	S of Aiken	Aiken	SC	33.48°N 81.41°W	10:10–10:12	0.2 mi (320 m)	50 yd (46 m)	None	A weak tornado caused minimal tree damage.
F0	Kinston	Lenoir	NC	35.27°N 77.58°W	11:00	0.1 mi (160 m)	5 yd (4.6 m)	Unknown	Several trees were downed.
F0	Williamston	Martin	NC	35.27°N 77.58°W	11:07	0.1 mi (160 m)	5 yd (4.6 m)	Unknown	A garage roof was torn off, with the car inside destroyed.
F0	E of American Falls	Power	ID	42.78°N 112.83°W	15:40h	9 mi (14 km)	100 yd (91 m)	$375,000	A large metal farm building had siding blown in and its roof partially peeled off. A potato storage building was destroyed and a large grain silo was severely damaged. Several large trees were downed and a building was destroyed at Willow Bay county park. Along the damage path, irrigation center pivots were flipped, and wheel line systems were twisted.
F1	E of Pingree	Bingham	ID	43.12°N 112.55°W	15:47–16:08h	14 mi (23 km)	300 yd (270 m)	$2,200,000	Near Riverside a mobile home and two connected garages were destroyed. Two silos were caved in near Pingree. Near Groveland a house and barn were destroyed. Three high tension towers were toppled. Throughout this tornado's path numerous homes received roof damage, sheds and outbuildings were destroyed, and large tree were uprooted and some fell on houses. About 25 irrigation center pivots were damaged, and many wheel line systems were twisted.
F0	W of Chubbuck	Bannock	ID	42.92°N 112.52°W	15:55–16:08h	5 mi (8.0 km)	50 yd (46 m)	$110,000	A couple houses were damaged, trees were knocked over, and several irrigation pivots were twisted. The main power line to Chubbuck was downed as well.
F1	S of Shelley	Bingham, Bonneville	ID	43.35°N 112.12°W	16:15–16:30h	12 mi (19 km)	200 yd (180 m)	$500,000	A garage was destroyed near the beginning of the tornado's path. Shelley High School sustained roof damage. Ten houses, six pivots, and 12 wheel line irrigation systems received damage or were destroyed. In Bonneville County, the tornado removed the roof of a house. Several large electric transmission poles were snapped.
F1	S of Firth	Bingham	ID	43.28°N 112.18°W	16:19–16:31h	9 mi (14 km)	200 yd (180 m)	$275,000	A mobile house and garage were destroyed, a cinder block house collapsed, and three other houses had roof damage near Taylorsville. Several irrigation pivots and wheel line systems were damaged. One person was injured.

=== February 16 event ===
List of confirmed tornadoes – February 16, 2000
F#	Location	County / Parish	State	Start Coord.	Time (UTC)	Path length	Max width	Damage	Summary
F0	Covina	Los Angeles	CA	34.08°N 117.88°W	00:30	0.5 mi (0.80 km)	10 yd (9.1 m)	Unknown	A weak tornado damaged four mobile homes.

=== February 18 event ===
List of confirmed tornadoes – February 18, 2000
F#	Location	County / Parish	State	Start Coord.	Time (UTC)	Path length	Max width	Damage	Summary
F1	WNW of Benton to SW of Bryant	Saline	AR	34.58°N 92.65°W	18:03–18:15	7.8 mi (12.6 km)	75 yd (69 m)	Unknown	This tornado moved due east through Benton, causing minor damage to 66 homes, major damage to 18 other houses, and damage to 10 commercial buildings. Trees and power lines were downed along its path. Nine people were injured.
F0	Wrightsville	Pulaski	AR	34.6°N 92.22°W	18:40	0.3 mi (480 m)	40 yd (37 m)	Unknown	A tornado briefly tracked across Highway 365 in Wrightsville, downing trees. Some trees fell on roofs and a car. One shed was also damaged.
F0	NE of Wrightsville	Pulaski	AR	34.63°N 92.13°W	18:50–18:51	0.5 mi (0.80 km)	50 yd (46 m)	Unknown	This tornado removed the steeple from a church, damaged a carport and shed, and knocked down several trees and poles.
F0	E of Caldwell	St. Francis	AR	35.08°N 90.77°W	21:00–21:05	1 mi (1.6 km)	25 yd (23 m)	$25,000	A mobile home was overturned, and several homes sustained damage.
F0	N of Mount Pleasant, MS	Marshall (MS), Fayette (TN)	MS, TN	35°N 89.52°W	22:14–22:20	1 mi (1.6 km)	25 yd (23 m)	Unknown	Emergency management reported a brief tornado. Little damage occurred.
F0	W of Hardy	Grenada	MS	33.88°N 89.85°W	23:15	1 mi (1.6 km)	40 yd (37 m)	$5,000	A few trees were downed by this weak tornado.
F0	SW of Scobey	Yalobusha	MS	33.93°N 89.88°W	23:19–23:25	1 mi (1.6 km)	25 yd (23 m)	Unknown	This tornado caused little damage.
F0	NE of Farmington	Alcorn	MS	34.97°N 88.38°W	00:15–00:20	1 mi (1.6 km)	25 yd (23 m)	Unknown	Emergency management reported a tornado that produced little damage.
F0	NE of Artesia	Lowndes	MS	33.45°N 88.62°W	02:25	1 mi (1.6 km)	40 yd (37 m)	Unknown	A storm chaser reported a tornado that caused no damage as it moved through open fields.

=== February 22 event ===
List of confirmed tornadoes – February 22, 2000
F#	Location	County / Parish	State	Start Coord.	Time (UTC)	Path length	Max width	Damage	Summary
F0	E of Pinecrest	Miami-Dade	FL	25.67°N 80.22°W	14:15–14:16	0.1 mi (0.16 km)	10 yd (9.1 m)	None	An off-duty NWS employee reported a waterspout move ashore, prompting Beach Patrol to evacuate their tower. No damage occurred.
F0	S of Midkiff	Reagan	TX	31.52°N 101.83°W	19:19–19:30	4 mi (6.4 km)	100 yd (91 m)	Unknown	A tornado was reported, however a damage path was not found.
F0	NW of Vernon	Wilbarger	TX	34.18°N 99.37°W	21:45–21:51	2 mi (3.2 km)	40 yd (37 m)	None	A storm spotter reported a tornado, which traveled a mile to the east before becoming wrapped in rain and lifting. No damage was reported.
F0	S of Lampasas	Lampasas	TX	31.02°N 98.18°W	03:00	0.1 mi (0.16 km)	0.1 yd (0.091 m)	Unknown	A brief tornado was reported at the Flying L Ranch.
F0	Killeen	Bell	TX	31.1°N 97.7°W	03:53–04:06	12 mi (19 km)	0.5 yd (0.46 m)	$15,000	A tornado, with an intermittent path, touched down in the Killen area. A boat storage building had its roof torn off and a wall collapsed. Power poles were downed leaving 3,700 customers without power. In Nolanville, the community center sustained roof damage and an awning was blown off a building.
F0	W of Concan	Uvalde	TX	29.5°N 99.8°W	04:36–04:38	0.1 mi (160 m)	20 yd (18 m)	None	Sheriff's department reported a tornado tracking southeast over open country.

=== February 23 event ===
List of confirmed tornadoes – February 23, 2000
F#	Location	County / Parish	State	Start Coord.	Time (UTC)	Path length	Max width	Damage	Summary
F0	Caguas	San Juan	PR	Unknown	18:35-18:45	0.2 mi (320 m)	10 yd (9.1 m)	Unknown	A tornado was reported along the Caguas expressway.

=== February 24 event ===
All dates are based on the local time zone where the tornado touched down.
F#	Location	County / Parish	State	Start Coord.	Time	Path length	Max width	Damage	Summary
F0	N of Miami	Roberts	TX	35.77°N 100.63°W	00:42–00:48	2 mi (3.2 km)	25 yd (23 m)	Unknown	A storm spotter reported a tornado that remained over open country.
F1	S of Follett, TX to SE of Laverne, OK	Lipscomb (TX), Ellis (OK), Harper (OK)	TX, OK	36.33°N 100.13°W	02:13–02:49	27 mi (43 km)	150 yd (140 m)	$592,000	A long tracked tornado started south of Follett and moved northeast. Nine irrigation systems were damaged, many trees were uprooted, and fences downed. The tornado also damaged roofs, outbuildings, wind mills, a tractor, and power poles in Lipscomb County. Moving into Oklahoma, the tornado continued to down power lines. Two houses had large portions of the roof blown off and damage to outbuildings, windmills, and trees occurring along the path. A hog barn received minor roof damage in Harper County before the tornado dissipated five miles southeast of Laverne.

=== February 25 event ===
List of confirmed tornadoes – February 25, 2000
F#	Location	County / Parish	State	Start Coord.	Time (UTC)	Path length	Max width	Damage	Summary
F1	Tulsa	Tulsa	OK	36.15°N 95.95°W	13:37	0.2 mi (320 m)	100 yd (91 m)	$100,000	A brief tornado touched down southeast of the Tulsa International Airport. At a farm equipment dealership, some of the equipment was damaged and a car was thrown on top of another. Power poles were downed along the path.
F0	W of Polk	Polk	MO	37.73°N 93.33°W	20:00–20:05	1 mi (1.6 km)	100 yd (91 m)	$60,000	Two houses received minor damage, two barns major damage, and five outbuildings were destroyed. Trees were downed along the path.
F1	S of Preston	Hickory	MO	37.90°N 93.2°W	20:20–20:25	5 mi (8.0 km)	100 yd (91 m)	$500,000	A fast moving tornado damaged the roof to Skyline Elementary School, destroyed most of the bus maintenance building, and severely damaged the communication tower. Advance warning allowed staff and students to take shelter, resulting in no injuries. Two nearby houses and outbuildings were destroyed.
F0	SW of Ashland	Boone	MO	38.75°N 92.28°W	21:35–21:36	0.2 mi (320 m)	50 yd (46 m)	Unknown	A brief tornado uprooted and downed trees.
F0	E of Deer Park	Callaway	MO	38.87°N 92.17°W	21:45–21:53	7 mi (11 km)	75 yd (69 m)	Unknown	Trees were downed, and several outbuildings were damaged.
F1	Hatton	Callaway	MO	39.02°N 92.03°W	22:00–22:03	3 mi (4.8 km)	100 yd (91 m)	Unknown	Trees were downed, and outbuildings were destroyed.

=== February 26 event ===
List of confirmed tornadoes – February 26, 2000
F#	Location	County / Parish	State	Start Coord.	Time (UTC)	Path length	Max width	Damage	Summary
F1	SE of Camden	Ouachita	AR	33.48°N 92.78°W	06:00	0.3 mi (480 m)	30 yd (27 m)	Unknown	A tornado destroyed a shed, barn, and portable office building. A nearby structure was damaged by flying debris. A large travel trailer also sustained damage.
F1	N of Twin Groves	Faulkner	AR	35.33°N 92.42°W	09:16	0.2 mi (320 m)	25 yd (23 m)	Unknown	A wood frame house was moved from its concrete block foundation, severely damaging it. The tornado removed many shingles from the roof of a church, with a portion of roof over a driveway having its siding removed. Several trees and a light pole were downed.

=== February 27 event ===
List of confirmed tornadoes – February 27, 2000
F#	Location	County / Parish	State	Start Coord.	Time (UTC)	Path length	Max width	Damage	Summary
F0	W of La Vina	Madera	CA	36.87°N 120.2°W	21:37–21:47	1 mi (1.6 km)	50 yd (46 m)	Unknown	A storm spotter reported a slow-moving tornado passing through open pasture and farmland.
F0	SW of Kerman	Fresno	CA	36.7°N 120.12°W	21:59–22:04	0.5 mi (0.80 km)	25 yd (23 m)	$25,000	This tornado knocked down twenty almond trees and displaced irrigation piping. Eyewitnesses recalled seeing a debris cloud of almond blossom petals.
F0	E of Raisin City	Fresno	CA	36.6°N 119.87°W	22:10–22:15	0.5 mi (0.80 km)	25 yd (23 m)	None	A trained spotter reported a tornado over open land.
F0	E of Easton	Fresno	CA	36.65°N 119.77°W	23:17–23:20	0.2 mi (320 m)	25 yd (23 m)	None	A short-lived tornado moved over open land and dissipated near the Fresno County dump.

=== February 29 event ===
List of confirmed tornadoes – February 29, 2000
F#	Location	County / Parish	State	Start Coord.	Time (UTC)	Path length	Max width	Damage	Summary
F0	S of Hatton	Callaway	MO	39°N 91.98°W	00:17–00:19	2.5 mi (4.0 km)	40 yd (37 m)	Unknown	A small tornado destroyed a barn. Several trees were uprooted or snapped along the path.
F0	W of Curryville	Pike	MO	39.35°N 91.45°W	01:50	10 mi (16 km)	50 yd (46 m)	Unknown	A small tornado in northeastern Pike County downed several trees.
