= Vernon High School =

Vernon High School may refer to:

- Vernon High School (Vernon, Florida)
- Vernon High School (Vernon, Texas)

== See also ==
- Vernon Secondary School, Vernon, British Columbia
