= Red Head, Florida =

- Unincorporated community
- Location within Florida
- Coordinates: 30°29′12″N 85°50′31″W
- Country: United States
- State: Florida
- County: Washington
- Elevation: 98 ft (30 m)
- Time zone: UTC-5 (Eastern (EST))
  - Summer (DST): UTC-4 (EDT)
- GNIS feature ID: 294903

Red Head is an unincorporated community in Washington County, Florida, United States. It is located along State Road 79 north of Ebro, and is the home of a local airstrip named Red Head Airport, which is a private enterprise where landings require prior permission.
