= Five Points, Washington County, Florida =

Coordinates: 30°42′47″N 85°45′05″W

Five Points, Florida
- Unincorporated community
- Location within Florida
- Country: United States
- State: Florida
- County: Washington
- Elevation: 75 ft (23 m)
- Time zone: UTC-6 (Central (CST))
  - Summer (DST): UTC-5 (CDT)
- ZIP code: 32427
- Area code: 850
- GNIS feature ID: 294769

Five Points is an unincorporated community in Washington County, Florida, United States. It is located along State Road 280 north of Vernon.
