= Buckley v. Haddock =

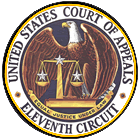
- Court: United States Court of Appeals for the Eleventh Circuit
- Full case name: Jesse Daniel Buckley v. Hon. Bobby Haddock, in his official capacity as Sheriff of Washington County and Jonathan Rackard, in his individual capacity
- Decided: September 9, 2008
- Citation: 292 F. App'x 791

Case history
- Prior history: No. 5:06-cv-53, 2007 WL 710169 (N.D. Fla. Mar. 06, 2007)
- Subsequent history: Rehearing denied, 308 Fed. App'x 449 (11th Cir. 2008)

Court membership
- Judges sitting: James Larry Edmondson, Joel Fredrick Dubina, Beverly B. Martin

Case opinions
- Majority: Edmondson
- Concurrence: Dubina
- Dissent: Martin

Buckley v. Haddock, 292 F. App'x 791 (11th Cir. 2008), was a case involving excessive force used upon Jesse Buckley by Deputy Sheriff Jonathan Rackard. Deputy Rackard used an electronic control device, or Taser, three times on Buckley because he was resisting arrest. The case was brought against the Sheriff of Washington County, Florida, Hon. Bobby Haddock, in the United States District Court for the Northern District of Florida. The District Court ruled in favor of Buckley, but the United States Court of Appeals for the Eleventh Circuit reversed, ruling in favor of Deputy Rackard.

== Background ==
Buckley was stopped by Deputy Rackard on the night of March 4, 2004 for speeding on the highway. After being pulled over, Buckley was issued a traffic citation that he refused to sign, stating that he was homeless and could not afford the ticket. In accordance with Florida state law, Buckley was required to sign the citation. Deputy Rackard then warned Buckley that he would be arrested if he did not comply. Buckley still refused and was handcuffed and removed from his vehicle. Once in handcuffs, Buckley dropped to the ground and refused to stand. Deputy Rackard attempted to lift Buckley from the ground but was unable to move him. Rackard proceeded to warn Buckley that any more resistance would result in him being tased. After having his commands ignored two more times, Deputy Rackard then discharged his Taser into Buckley, two separate times at five second intervals. Rackard, still unable to get Buckley off of the ground, called for backup. Upon returning from calling for backup, Rackard again asked Buckley to get off the ground, and then tased him for a third and final time when his request was ignored. After Rackard's backup arrived, Buckley finally agreed to be taken into custody.

Buckley pleaded no contest to refusing to sign the speeding ticket and one count of resisting arrest without violence. He later brought a lawsuit claiming both physical and emotional injury due to excessive force used in his arrest.

== Policy and Procedures ==
The following can be found in the Washington County Sheriff's Office Policy and Procedures Manual regarding the use of Tasers against subjects who are placed under arrest, stating that Tasers

May be used to control a dangerous or violent subject when deadly physical force does not appear to be justified and/or necessary; or attempts to subdue the subject by other conventional tactics have been, or likely will be, ineffective in the situation at hand; or there is reasonable expectation that it will be unsafe for officers to approach within contact range of the subject.

== District Court ==
Buckley brought his case to the United States District Court for the Northern District of Florida in September 2008. He alleged that deputy Rackard used excessive force against him in his arrest, resulting in sixteen burn marks he suffered from the three Taser attacks. The case was presided over by Judge Richard Smoak. The court ruled in favor of Buckley, denying qualified Immunity for Rackard. The court judged that Buckley, having already been handcuffed, showed no danger of flight or to Rackard, and that the use of the Taser three times was wholly unnecessary. Smoak stated that a precedent for Buckley's case was already made in Lee v. Feraro 2002, where the plaintiff was pulled from her vehicle for a minor traffic violation, handcuffed, and injured when the arresting officer slammed her head onto the trunk of her car. Lee v. Ferraro established factors that needed to be considered in deciding whether the law enforcement official's use of force is constitutional:

- The need for the force
- The relation between the need and amount of force used
- The extent of the injury inflicted

Smoak stated that "it may be arguable that one application of the Taser was appropriate; however, the multiple applications of force were unnecessary and grossly disproportionate."

== Appeal ==
Haddock's office appealed the case to the United States Court of Appeals for the Eleventh Circuit in September 2008. The appellate panel consisted of the Hon. J.L. Edmonson, Hon. Beverly Martin, and Hon. Joel F. Dubina. The court overturned the District Court's ruling in a 2–1 vote, saying that Rackard was within his rights to subdue Buckley. The court stated that, despite being handcuffed, Buckley could have still posed a potential risk of flight or attack since his legs were not restrained, and that keeping both him and the officer on the side of a highway posed the danger of both of them being injured by traffic. They also stated that Buckley's passive resistance caused Rackard and the assisting officers to be unavailable for more serious situations, should one have arisen that required their immediate dispatch.

Judge Edmonson was the most vehement in his defense of Deputy Rackard, stating that:

- It was night-time, on the side of a highway, with considerable passing traffic
- Buckley was "resisting"
- The Taser was used only after repeated warnings to Buckley

In addition, Judge Edmonson also asserted that because of Buckley's unique response, he had created a situation without precedent, meaning that the officer had no previous cases with which to judge if "his actions were improper". Chief Judge Dubina agreed that while the force was excessive, Deputy Rackard was still entitled to qualified immunity because of the lack of precedent.

Judge Martin dissented, arguing that even though no precedent existed, the officer should have known his actions were wrong, stating:

I also conclude that at the time of the incident, Deputy Rackard was on fair notice that his conduct was unconstitutional […]Because our law clearly establishes such conduct as unconstitutional, I would affirm the district court's denial of qualified immunity and allow this action to proceed.

Judge Martin, in her dissent, agreed with the District Court's initial ruling, stating that Buckley was not only unnecessarily harmed, but also not given adequate time to comply with Rackard's orders after being tased. She also suggested publishing the video taken from Rackard's cruiser's dashboard camera for public consideration.

In discussing law enforcement's rights with regard to their use of force on citizens, the court referred to the Fourth Amendment. With this amendment, the court established what is "reasonable" for law enforcement to be able to do. In Buckley v. Haddock, the court viewed the officers' actions as objectively reasonable. Buckley's unwillingness to obey the law, and the fact that he and the officer were at risk of harm, gave rise to the officer's right to use the resources he had available to him in order to get Buckley to comply. The court also referred to Graham v. Connor, which established that a law enforcement official has the right to use some degree of physical force or threat on the arrested individual when making an arrest. In addition, Lee v. Ferraro was also cited in order to show that the injuries the plaintiff received were minimal, and the use of force was necessary.

In its two to one decision, the appellate court found in favor of Deputy Rackard, upholding his qualified immunity. Charges were dropped against Deputy Rackard, and the case was closed.

== Buckley v. Haddock as Precedent ==
This decision protects officers of the law from claims of excessive force in events where the other party is unaggressively non-compliant.

Today, TASER international includes a brief summary of Buckley v. Haddock on their website under a page entitled "Brief Summary of Electronic Control Device Cases of Interest for Law Enforcement." While the page is not intended as a sole form of legal advice, it does say that the Eleventh Circuit court upheld Deputy Rackard's right in "enforcing the law on its own terms."

This case also established the possibility of courts presenting all underlying evidence of a case online for public viewing.

== Public Reaction ==
The District Court's decision drew some criticism from public and legal communities. Some news outlets, including The New York Times, reported on the court's decision, in which Buckley's lawyer criticizes Deputy Rackard's actions as "less a question of law, and more one of how we have evolved as a species." Several other legal blogs, including a post by the ACLU, in which Maria Kayanan, its Florida Associate Legal Director, criticizes the institution, stating that: "The Eleventh Circuit's ruling licenses police officers to use Tasers as cattle prods to inflict gratuitous pain on a nonviolent handcuffed arrestee, simply to herd him towards a police car. The repeated and excruciatingly painful application of 50,000 volts of electricity was once the exclusive province of the agents and implements of torture, and cannot be condoned in a civilized society."

People against the decision also argued that the use of the Taser to subdue Buckley was counter-intuitive, since the primary function of a Taser is to incapacitate muscles and make the target immobile. Since Buckley was already passive and unresponsive, the use of the Taser would not have helped Deputy Rackard in getting Buckley into the vehicle. It would have made the situation harder, as evidenced by Deputy Rackard's other two Taser attacks, because the after the first one, Buckley was unresponsive. The Villanova Law Review wrote that

TASERing Buckley did not serve the government's interest in effective law enforcement because it did not resolve the problem of getting Buckley into the police cruiser.
