= Wausau, Florida =

Town in the state of Florida, United States

- Town
- Town of Wausau
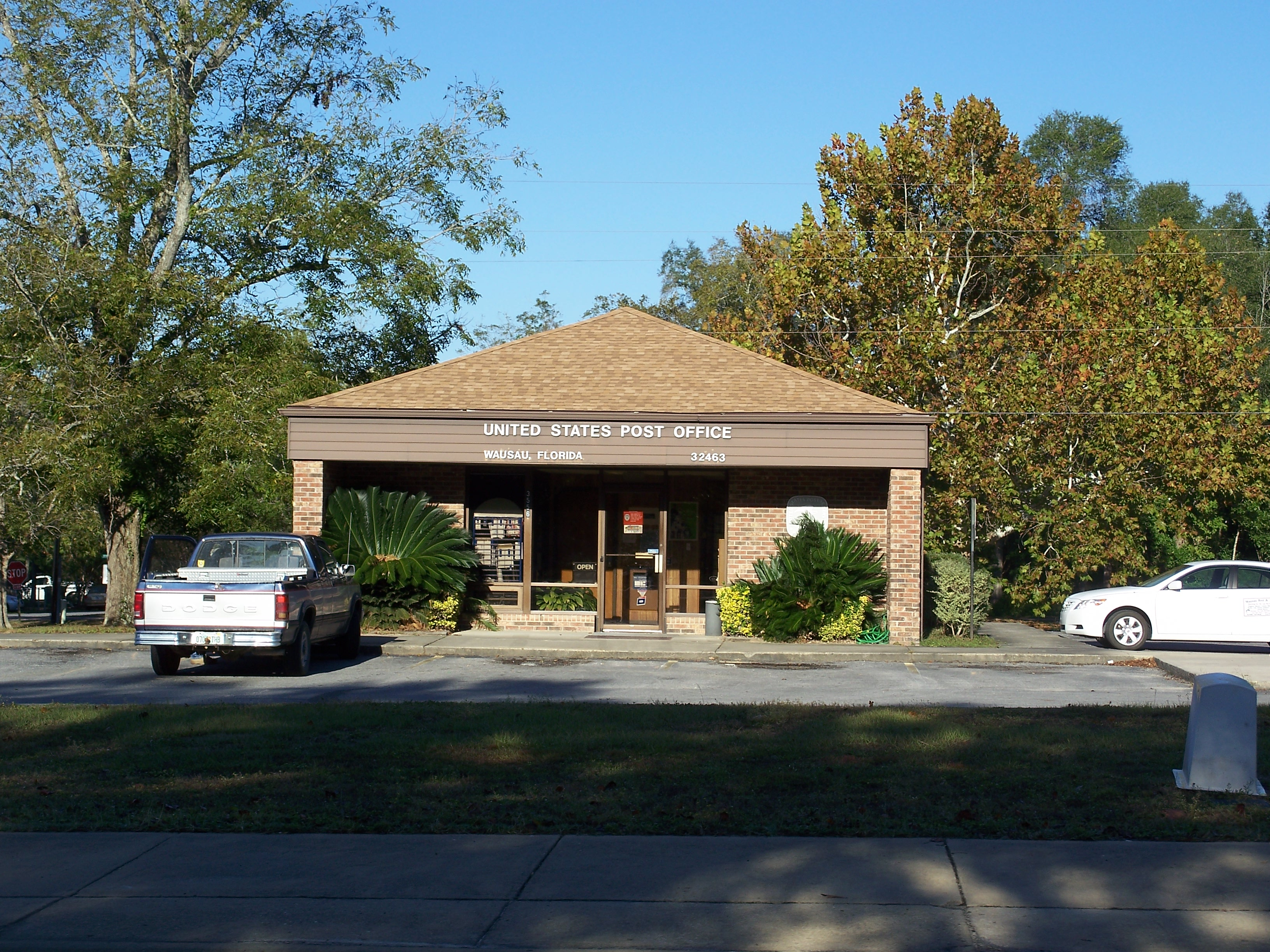
- Wausau United States Post Office
- Motto: "Possum Capital of the World"
- Location in Washington County and the state of Florida
- Coordinates: 30°37′40″N 85°35′16″W
- Country: United States
- State: Florida
- County: Washington
- Settled: c. Late 1800s
- Incorporated: 1963
- Named for: Wausau, Wisconsin

Government
  - Type: Mayor-Council
  - Mayor: Roger Dale Hagan
  - Mayor Pro Tem: Joe Phillips
  - Council Members: Shirley Rightenburg, Judy Carter, and Charles W. "Billy" Park
  - Town Clerk: Lynn Gothard
  - Town Attorney: Jeff S. Carter

Area
  - Total: 1.15 sq mi (2.98 km^{2})
  - Land: 1.15 sq mi (2.98 km^{2})
  - Water: 0 sq mi (0.00 km^{2})
- Elevation: 85 ft (26 m)

Population (2020)
  - Total: 371
  - Density: 322.4/sq mi (124.47/km^{2})
- Time zone: UTC-6 (Central (CST))
  - Summer (DST): UTC-5 (CDT)
- ZIP code: 32463
- Area code(s): 850, 448
- FIPS code: 12-75450
- GNIS feature ID: 2406841
- Website: wausauflorida.net

Wausau is a town in Washington County, Florida, United States. The Town of Wausau is part of the Florida Panhandle in North Florida. The population was 371 at the 2020 census, down from 383 at the 2010 census. It is part of the Panama City–Panama City Beach, Florida Metropolitan Statistical Area.

== Geography ==
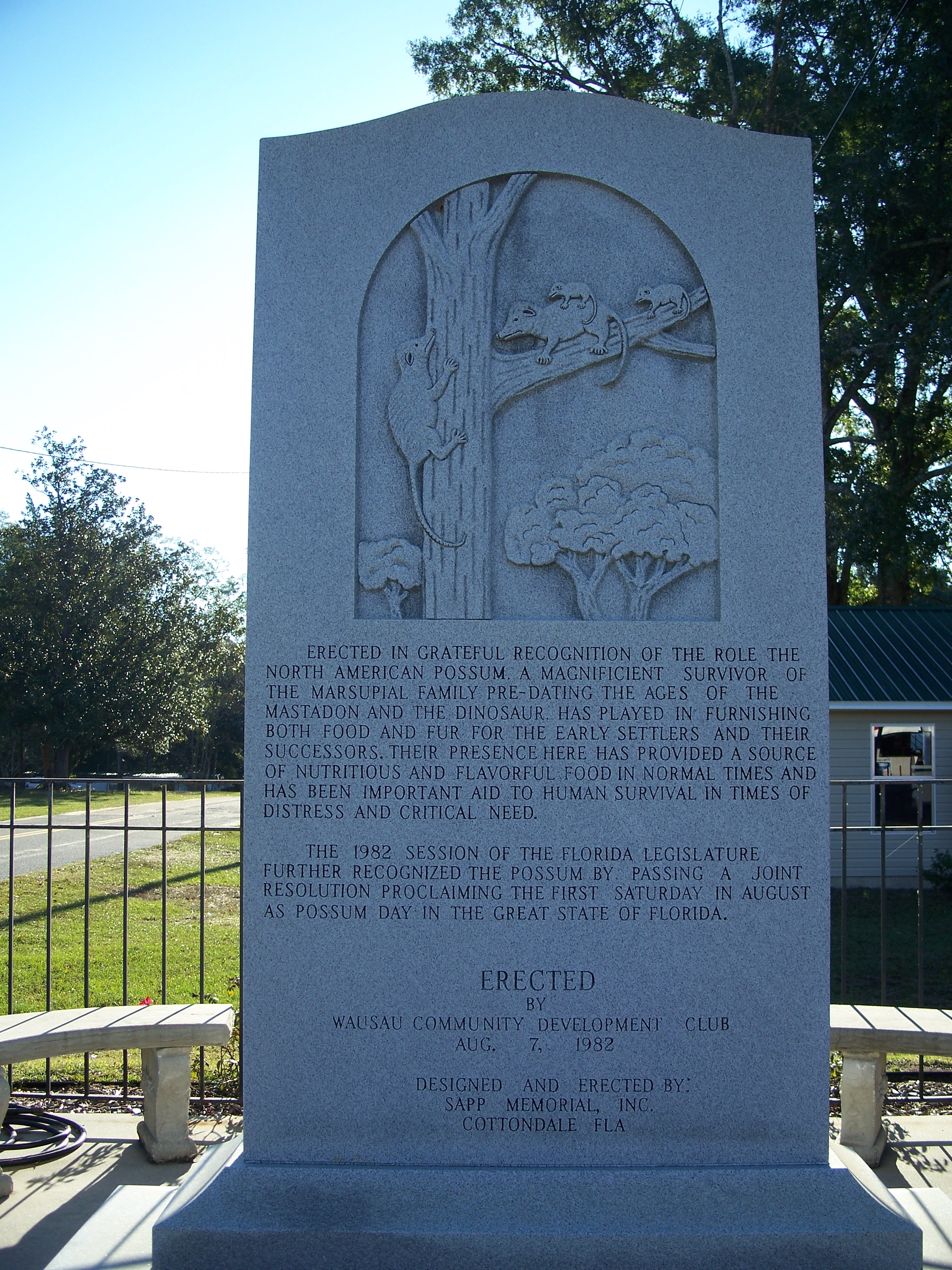
Possum Monument

The town is located in North Florida on the Florida Panhandle along Florida State Road 77 (FL-77), which is the main route through the town. FL-77 leads north 11 mi (18 km) to Chipley, the Washington County seat, and south 36 mi (58 km) to Panama City.

According to the United States Census Bureau, the town has a total area of 1.1 square miles (2.8 km^{2}), all land.

=== Climate ===
The climate in this area is characterized by hot, humid summers and generally mild winters. According to the Köppen climate classification, the Town of Wausau has a humid subtropical climate zone (Cfa).

== Demographics ==
Historical population
Census	Pop.	Note	%±
1970	288		—
1980	347		20.5%
1990	313		−9.8%
2000	398		27.2%
2010	383		−3.8%
2020	371		−3.1%
U.S. Decennial Census

=== 2010 and 2020 census ===
Wausau racial composition (Hispanics excluded from racial categories) (NH = Non-Hispanic)
Race	Pop 2010	Pop 2020	% 2010	% 2020
White (NH)	358	330	93.47%	88.95%
Black or African American (NH)	3	4	0.78%	1.08%
Native American or Alaska Native (NH)	3	0	0.78%	0.00%
Asian (NH)	3	1	0.78%	0.27%
Pacific Islander or Native Hawaiian (NH)	0	0	0.00%	0.00%
Some other race (NH)	0	3	0.00%	0.81%
Two or more races/Multiracial (NH)	10	22	2.61%	5.93%
Hispanic or Latino (any race)	6	11	1.57%	2.96%
Total	383	371		

As of the 2020 United States census, there were 371 people, 172 households, and 92 families residing in the town.

As of the 2010 United States census, there were 383 people, 122 households, and 98 families residing in the town.

=== 2000 census ===
As of the census of 2000, there were 398 people, 163 households, and 106 families residing in the town. The population density was 351.8 inhabitants per square mile (135.8/km^{2}). There were 177 housing units at an average density of 156.4 units per square mile (60.4 units/km^{2}). The racial makeup of the town was 94.47% White, 0.50% African American, 0.75% Native American, 0.25% Asian, 0.50% from other races, and 3.52% from two or more races. Hispanic or Latino of any race were 2.51% of the population.

In 2000, there were 163 households, out of which 27.6% had children under the age of 18 living with them, 47.9% were married couples living together, 12.9% had a female householder with no husband present, and 34.4% were non-families. 30.1% of all households were made up of individuals, and 15.3% had someone living alone who was 65 years of age or older. The average household size was 2.44 and the average family size was 3.04.

In 2000, in the town, the population was spread out, with 26.9% under the age of 18, 8.3% from 18 to 24, 24.1% from 25 to 44, 24.1% from 45 to 64, and 16.6% who were 65 years of age or older. The median age was 37 years. For every 100 females, there were 94.1 males. For every 100 females age 18 and over, there were 89.0 males.

In 2000, the median income for a household in the town was $21,000, and the median income for a family was $23,000. Males had a median income of $20,481 versus $21,563 for females. The per capita income for the town was $10,722. About 25.0% of families and 29.2% of the population were below the poverty line, including 35.2% of those under age 18 and 19.7% of those age 65 or over.

== Local event ==
Wausau is the "Possum Capital of the World" and celebrates annually with the Wausau Possum Festival, a celebration of the Virginia opossum.
