= Caryville, Florida =

Town in the state of Florida, United States

- Town
- Location in Washington County and the state of Florida
- Coordinates: 30°46′31″N 85°48′43″W
- Country: United States
- State: Florida
- County: Washington
- Settled (Half Moon Bluff): 1871–1884
- Unincorporated (Caryville): 1884–1913
- Incorporated (Town of Caryville): 1913
- Reincorporated (Town of Caryville): 1965

Government
  - Type: Chair-Council
  - Council Chair: Larry Palmer
  - Council Members: Henry Chambers, James Taylor, Mary Pate, and Michael "Brandon" Sasser
  - Town Clerk: Kent Taylor

Area
  - Total: 3.14 sq mi (8.13 km^{2})
  - Land: 3.01 sq mi (7.80 km^{2})
  - Water: 0.13 sq mi (0.33 km^{2})
- Elevation: 52 ft (16 m)

Population (2020)
  - Total: 301
  - Density: 99.9/sq mi (38.58/km^{2})
- Time zone: UTC-6 (Central (CST))
  - Summer (DST): UTC-5 (CDT)
- ZIP code: 32427
- Area code(s): 850, 448
- FIPS code: 12-10975
- GNIS feature ID: 2406231

Caryville is a town in Washington County, Florida, United States located along the Choctawhatchee River. Caryville is part of the Florida Panhandle in North Florida. The population was 301 at the 2020 census, down from 411 at the 2010 census. It is part of the Panama City—Panama City Beach, Florida Metropolitan Statistical Area.

== Geography ==
Caryville is part of the Florida Panhandle in North Florida and located in the upper northwest border of Washington County.

According to the United States Census Bureau, the town has a total area of 3.2 square miles (8.3 km^{2}), of which 3.0 square miles (7.8 km^{2}) is land and 0.1 square miles (0.26 km^{2}) (4.13%) is water.

=== Climate ===
The climate in this area is characterized by hot, humid summers and generally mild winters. According to the Köppen climate classification, the Town of Caryville has a humid subtropical climate zone (Cfa).

== History ==
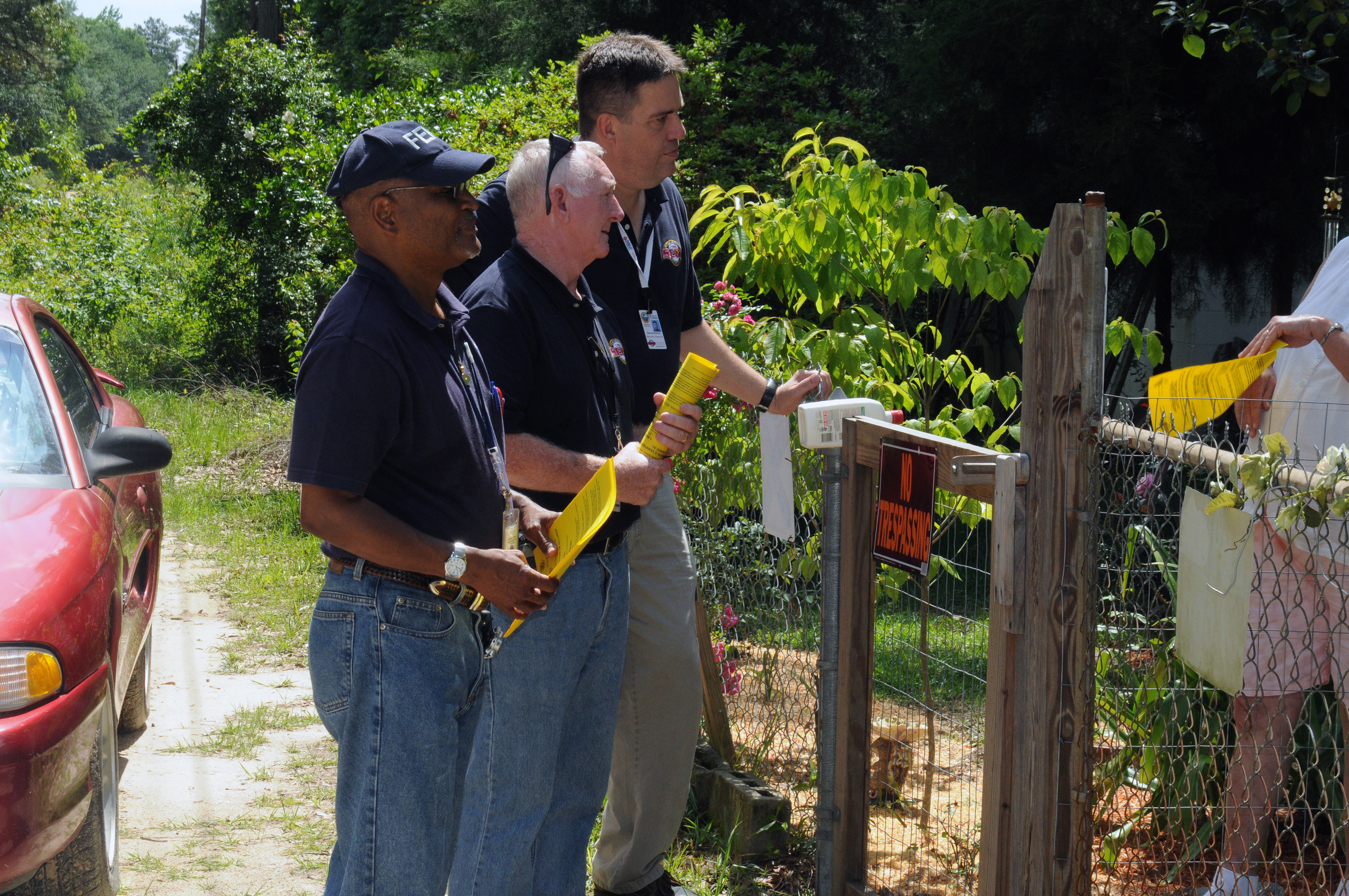
In May 2009, FEMA representatives inform local residents of available disaster services.

The area was first settled under the name "'Half Moon Bluff", in 1871. The community was renamed "Caryville" in 1884, after R.M. Cary. He was a stockholder and official of the Pensacola and Atlantic Railroad (which later became a part of the Louisville and Nashville Railroad system). In 1903, it was also the first Washington County community that had electric lights. The Town of Caryville was first officially incorporated in 1913. Between the late 1930s to early 1940s, Caryville's municipal charter and home rule lapsed due to its lack of use. It wasn't officially reincorporated as a municipality until 1965.

During July 1994, the Choctawhatchee River flooded and rose to a record level of 29 feet. The flooding submerged most of Caryville under water. Due to the "buyout" of the Federal Emergency Management Agency (FEMA), many residents left. This departure left only about 200 residents in the town.

== Demographics ==
Historical population
Census	Pop.	Note	%±
1920	440		—
1930	1,022		132.3%
1940	279		−72.7%
1950	525		88.2%
1960	730		39.0%
1970	724		−0.8%
1980	633		−12.6%
1990	631		−0.3%
2000	218		−65.5%
2010	411		88.5%
2020	301		−26.8%
U.S. Decennial Census

=== 2010 and 2020 census ===
Caryville racial composition (Hispanics excluded from racial categories) (NH = Non-Hispanic)
Race	Pop 2010	Pop 2020	% 2010	% 2020
White (NH)	249	254	60.58%	84.39%
Black or African American (NH)	134	27	32.60%	8.97%
Native American or Alaska Native (NH)	1	0	0.24%	0.00%
Asian (NH)	1	0	0.24%	0.00%
Pacific Islander or Native Hawaiian (NH)	0	1	0.00%	0.33%
Some other race (NH)	0	0	0.00%	0.00%
Two or more races/Multiracial (NH)	14	15	3.41%	4.98%
Hispanic or Latino (any race)	12	4	2.92%	1.33%
Total	411	301		

As of the 2020 United States census, there were 301 people, 93 households, and 66 families residing in the town.

As of the 2010 United States census, there were 411 people, 102 households, and 81 families residing in the town.

=== 2000 census ===
As of the census of 2000, there were 218 people, 86 households, and 57 families residing in the town. The population density was 72.1 inhabitants per square mile (27.8/km^{2}). There were 110 housing units at an average density of 36.4 units per square mile (14.1 units/km^{2}). The racial makeup of the town was 73.39% White, 20.64% African American, 1.38% Native American, 2.75% from other races, and 1.83% from two or more races. Hispanic or Latino of any race were 5.96% of the population.

In 2000, there were 86 households, out of which 36.0% had children under the age of 18 living with them, 48.8% were married couples living together, 15.1% had a female householder with no husband present, and 32.6% were non-families. 26.7% of all households were made up of individuals, and 12.8% had someone living alone who was 65 years of age or older. The average household size was 2.53 and the average family size was 3.16.

In 2000, in the town, the population was spread out, with 32.1% under the age of 18, 6.4% from 18 to 24, 28.9% from 25 to 44, 19.3% from 45 to 64, and 13.3% who were 65 years of age or older. The median age was 32 years. For every 100 females, there were 115.8 males. For every 100 females age 18 and over, there were 97.3 males.

In 2000, the median income for a household in the town was $22,500, and the median income for a family was $28,750. Males had a median income of $25,000 versus $15,625 for females. The per capita income for the town was $11,385. About 16.7% of families and 37.3% of the population were below the poverty line, including 66.7% of those under the age of eighteen and 35.1% of those 65 or over.

== Notable people ==
- Robert L. Carter, United States District Court judge and civil rights activist
- Bob Thorpe, Major League Baseball player
