= Sunny Hills, Florida =

Sunny Hills
- Unincorporated community
- Location within Florida
- Coordinates: 30°32′N 85°36′W
- Country: United States
- State: Florida
- County: Washington
- Time zone: UTC-6 (Central (CST))
  - Summer (DST): UTC-5 (CDT)
- ZIP code: 32428
- Area code: 850

Sunny Hills is an unincorporated community in Washington County, Florida, roughly halfway between Chipley and Panama City in the Florida panhandle. It is located along State Road 77, north of Greenhead, and is the site of the Sunny Hills Golf and Country Club. Sunny Hills is owned by the Deltona Corporation, a developer of planned cities. Begun in the late 1960s, Sunny Hills was to be a planned city with an anticipated 60,000 residents. Miles of roads were built but despite early interest the development did not succeed and the majority of the roughly 25,000 acres were left undeveloped. Recent estimates by the Washington County Chamber of Commerce identify just 619 homes spread over 220 miles of streets. Most streets have no houses on them.
