= Holmes Valley, Florida =

- Unincorporated community
- Location within Florida
- Coordinates: 30°34′36″N 85°44′35″W
- Country: United States
- State: Florida
- County: Washington
- Elevation: 197 ft (60 m)
- Time zone: UTC-6 (Central (CST))
  - Summer (DST): UTC-5 (CDT)
- ZIP code: 32462
- Area code: 850
- GNIS feature ID: 295354

Holmes Valley is an unincorporated community in Washington County, Florida on State Hwy 279. It was founded in 1848 after federal troops pursued Creek Indian Chief Holmes there and killed him on the spot.

Robert Edwin Russ, the founder of Ruston, Louisiana, was born in Holmes Valley in 1830.

== Historical church ==
In 1857, native pine was used to build a tiny, primitive church, the Moss Hill Methodist Church in Holmes Valley. Hand-planed tongue-and-groove planks were laid down, and wooden nails and square pegs were used in its construction. The pulpit furniture and pews were hand-hewn.

Today the church remains almost unchanged and remains without heat or electricity. However, it was the second building in the county to have glass windows. It sits in a clearing surrounded by dense woods.

It is open to the public as a historical monument.
