= New Hope, Florida =

- Unincorporated community
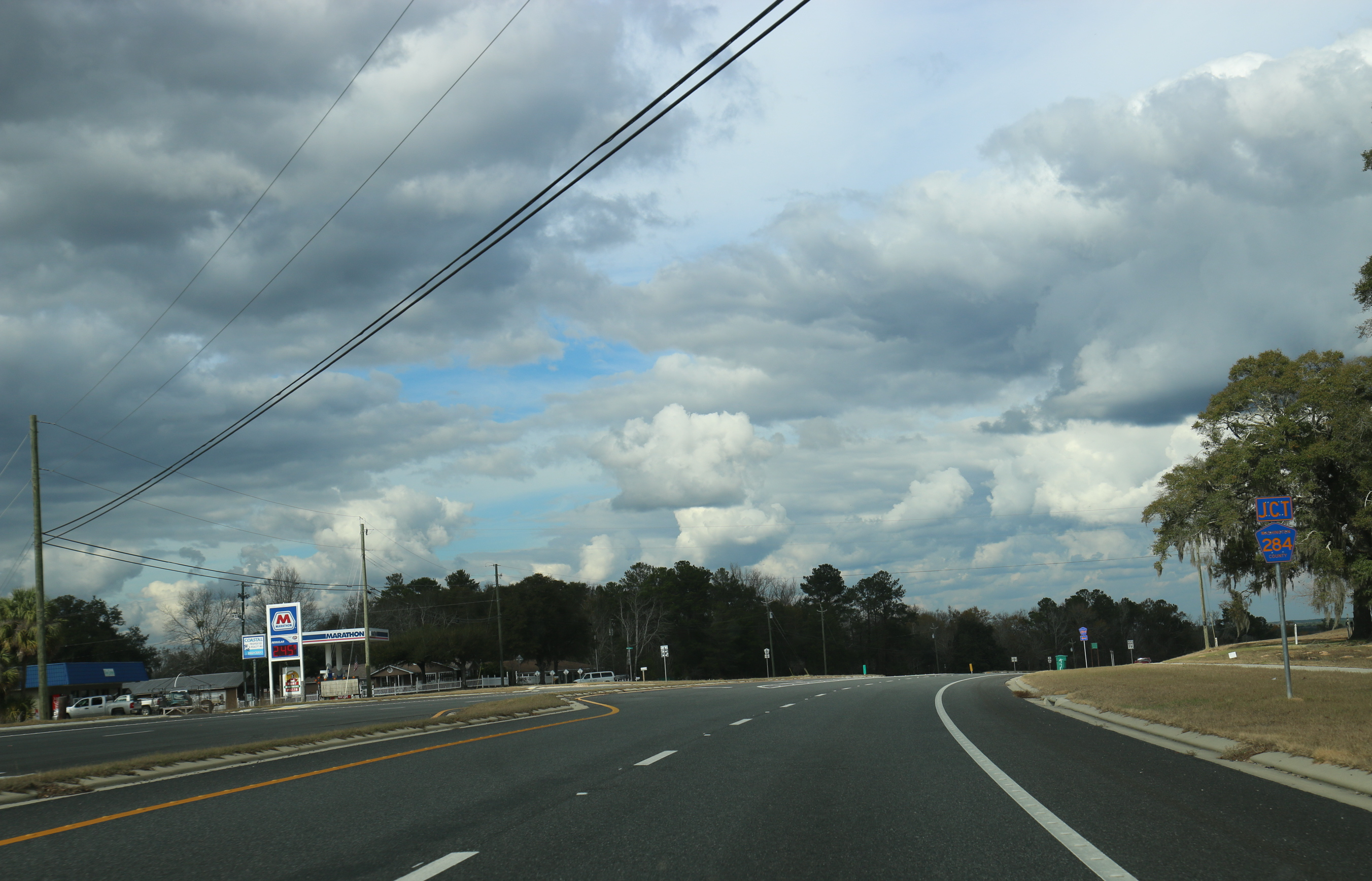
- New Hope on SR79 in 2017

- Location within Florida
- Coordinates: 30°34′40.78″N 85°48′33.51″W
- Country: United States
- State: Florida
- County: Washington
- Elevation: 194 ft (59 m)
- Time zone: UTC-5 (Central (CST))
  - Summer (DST): UTC-4 (EDT)
- ZIP code: 32428
- Area code: 850
- GNIS feature ID: 295485

New Hope is an unincorporated community in Washington County, Florida, United States. It is located on State Road 79.

== Images ==
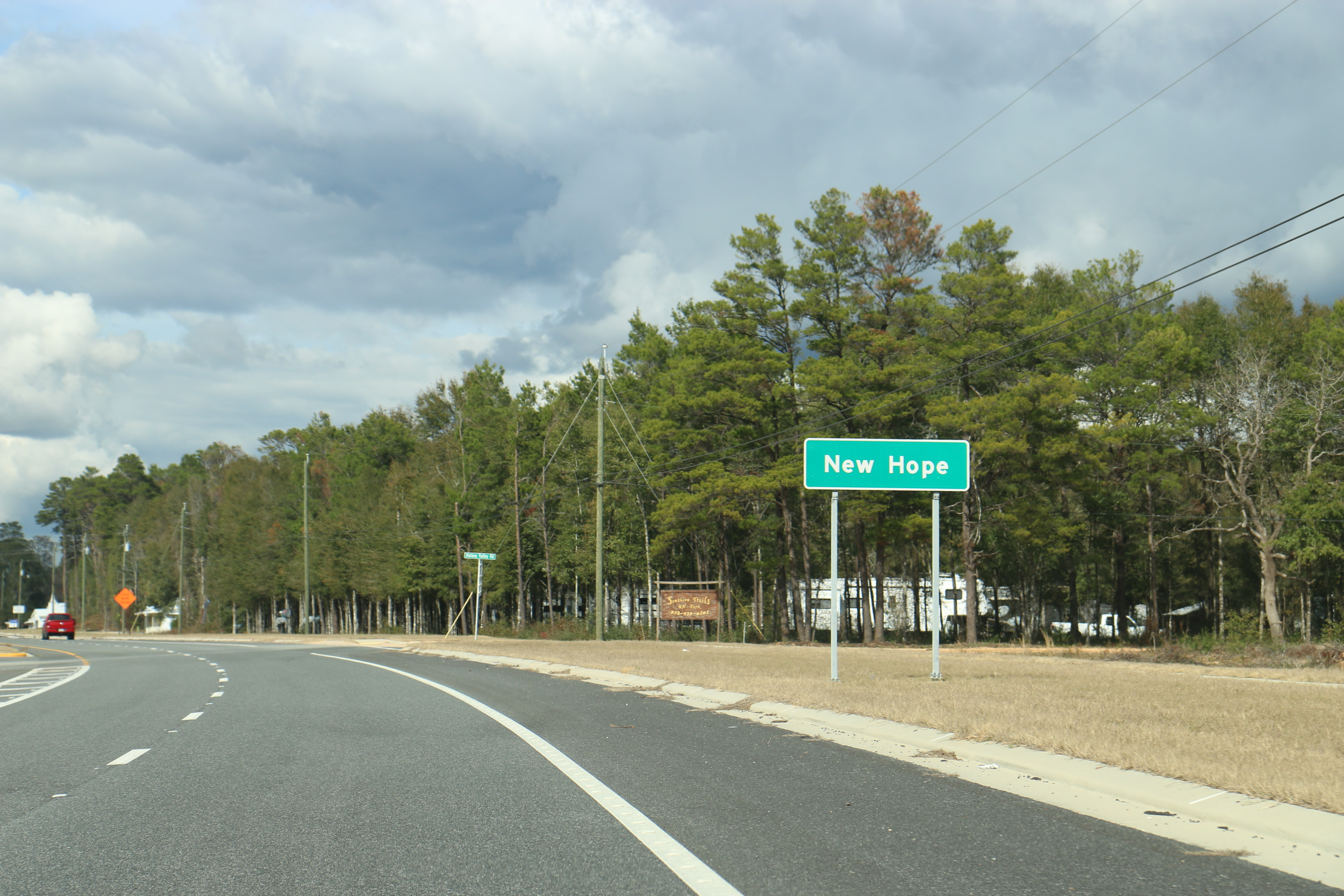
Sign on SR79

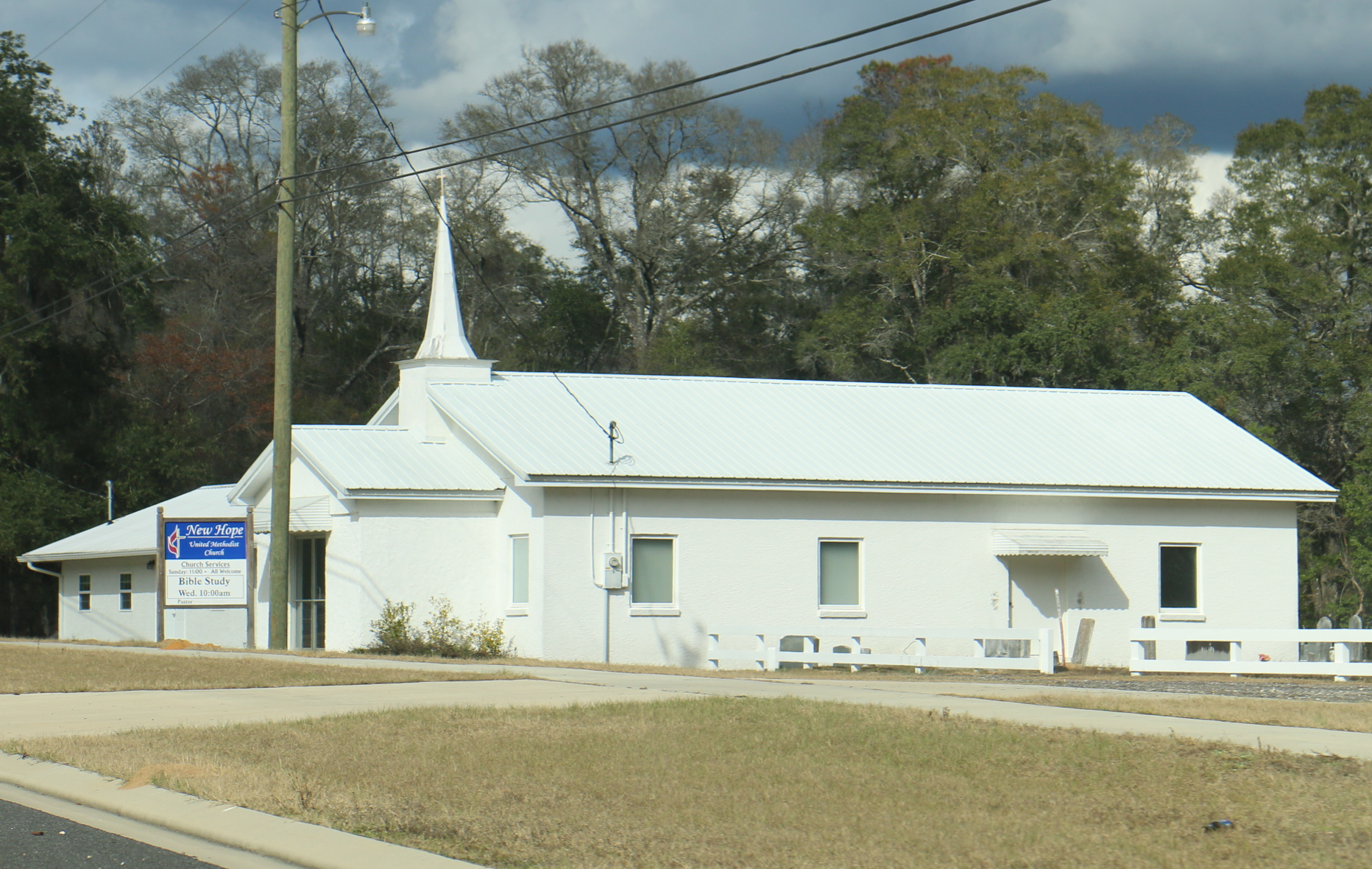
New Hope United Methodist Church
