= Vernon High School (Vernon, Florida) =

Location
- 3232 Moss Hill Road; Vernon, Florida; United States; 30.6086°N 85.6930°W

Information
- Type: Public
- Established: 2006
- School district: Washington County School District
- NCES School ID: 120201002029
- Principal: Ellen Grainger
- Faculty: 19.00 (on an FTE basis)
- Grades: 9 to 12
- Enrollment: 344 (2022-23)
- Student to teacher ratio: 18.11
- Colors: Royal blue and orange
- Mascot: Jackets
- Nickname: Yellow Jackets
- Website: vhs.wcsdschools.com

Vernon High School is located at 3232 Moss Hill Road in Vernon, Florida. It is one of two high schools in the Washington County School District.

The current Vernon High School on Moss Hill Road was completed for fall of 2006 classes. It features Wireless computer networking and a 325-seat auditorium. It was an A-rated school for the 2012–2013 school year. The school colors are blue, white, and orange, and the school's teams compete as the Jackets.

== History ==
In 1872, the citizens in the area of Vernon began raising money for a school and in 1876 two acres of land were donated by a Mr. Roche. The county board entered into a $1,000 contract for construction and a two-room schoolhouse it was completed in 1877. It was located near the town's existent Methodist Church. It was destroyed by fire in 1905 and it was replaced with a four-room building. A larger school building was built circa 1920 for the elementary grades and the first high school, with the first Vernon High School graduating class in 1929. Another Vernon High School was built in 1931 serving kindergarten through twelfth grades, and a separate elementary school was built in 1968 on the east side of Vernon.
