= Vernon, Florida =

- City
- City of Vernon
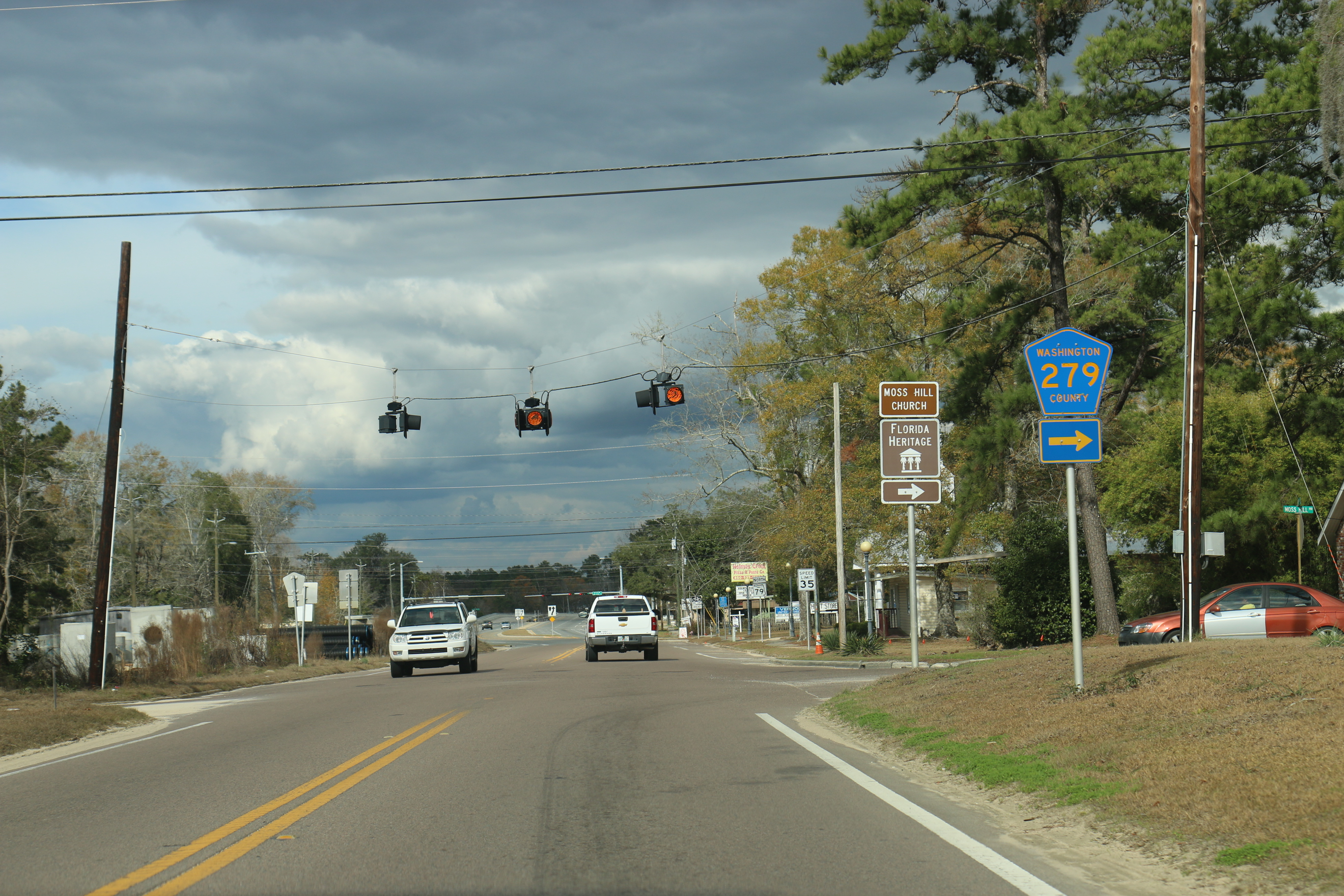
- Florida State Road 79 in Vernon

- Location in Washington County and the state of Florida
- Coordinates: 30°37′35″N 85°42′12″W
- Country: United States
- State: Florida
- County: Washington
- Settled during the Florida Territory (Roche's Bluff): c. 1820s-1851
- Settled in Florida State (Vernon): 1851
- Incorporated (City of Vernon): 1926
- Named after: Mount Vernon

Government
  - Type: Mayor-Council
  - Mayor: Gary W. Owens
  - Council President: Becky Baxley
  - Councilmembers: Tina Sloan, Frank Zurica, F. Brittan Brock, and Council Vice President Gwen (Gwendolyn) March
  - City Clerk: Candice Hodges
  - City Attorney: Michelle Blankenship-Jordan

Area
  - Total: 4.77 sq mi (12.35 km^{2})
  - Land: 4.76 sq mi (12.34 km^{2})
  - Water: 0.0039 sq mi (0.01 km^{2})
- Elevation: 46 ft (14 m)

Population (2020)
  - Total: 732
  - Density: 153.7/sq mi (59.33/km^{2})
- Time zone: UTC-6 (Central (CST))
  - Summer (DST): UTC-5 (CDT)
- ZIP code: 32462
- Area code(s): 850, 448
- FIPS code: 12-74125
- GNIS feature ID: 2405642
- Website: vernonflorida.net

Vernon is a city in Washington County, Florida. The population was 732 at the 2020 census, up from 687 at the 2010 census. It is part of the Panama City—Panama City Beach, Florida Metropolitan Statistical Area.

== History ==
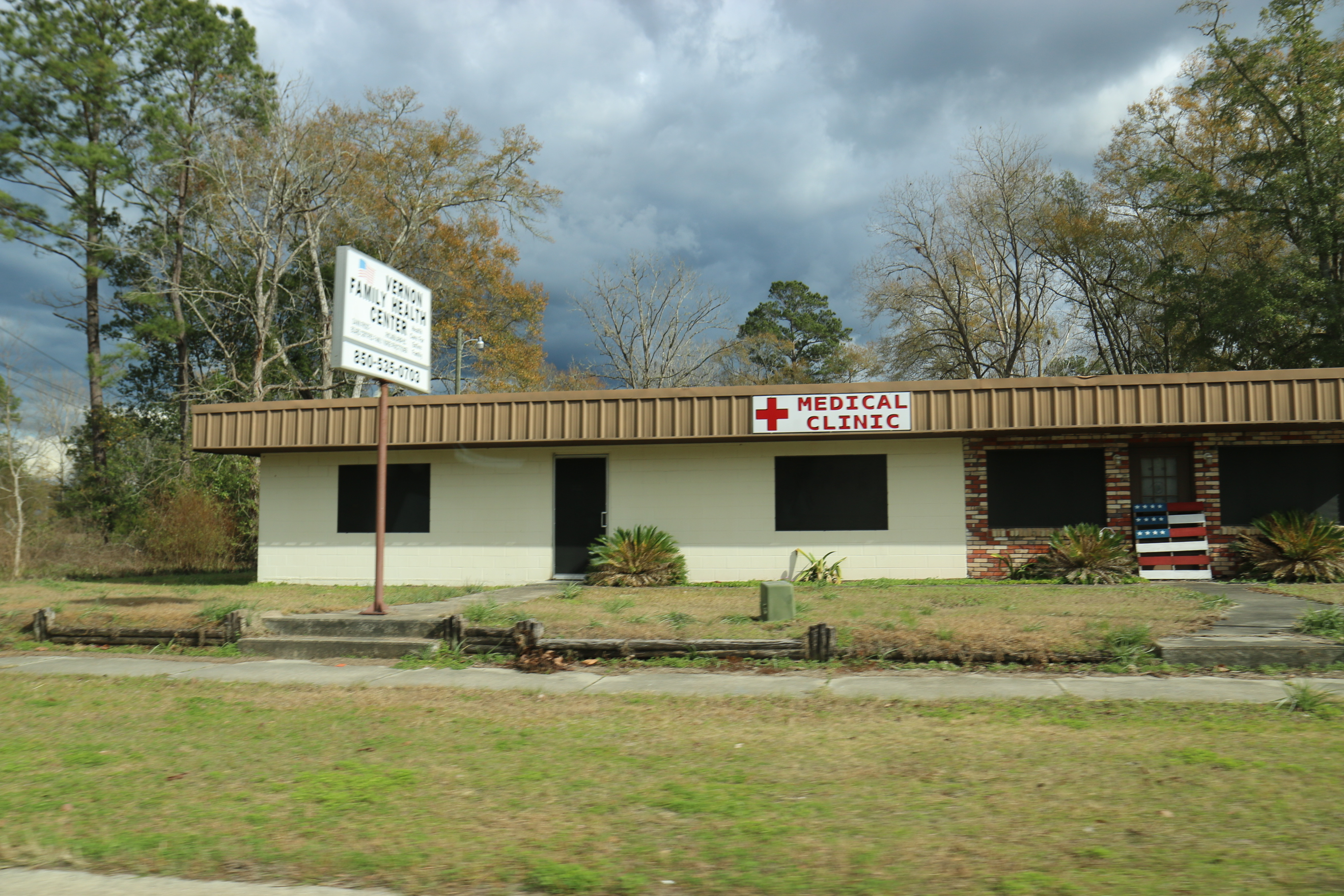
Vernon Family Health Center

The pioneer city was the site of a major Native American settlement before colonization. In the 1820s, during the Florida Territory era, Vernon started off as a colonial settlement called "Roche's Bluff" after one of the earliest settler's surname, Stephen J. Roche, who built and owned a trading post along Holmes Creek. The community was renamed "Vernon" in 1851. It was renamed for George Washington's Virginia home, Mount Vernon, playing off the county's name being Washington County. Vernon held the county seat from 1851 until 1927, when the seat was moved to Chipley.

The city sits on Holmes Creek where, during the 1880s, the creek was used as a shipping route to Bonifay and other nearby municipalities. The creek was also used to ship gopher tortoises due to the high value their shell carried at that time. It was officially incorporated as the City of Vernon in 1926.

Vernon gained infamy in the late 1950s and early 1960s due to the improbably high percentage of residents who made insurance claims for lost limbs, leading to an investigation of whether residents of the city were intentionally dismembering themselves for the insurance money. These insurance claims from Vernon, with a population of 500 to 800, accounted for as many as 2/3 of claims nationally, but there was no way of proving that any particular amputation was deliberate. This led to Vernon being referred to as "nub city" during this period. In 1980, Errol Morris attempted to make a documentary about this phenomenon, but after being threatened by city residents and physically attacked by one, he changed the focus of the film, resulting in the 1981 documentary film Vernon, Florida.

== Geography ==
Florida State Road 79 is the main route through the city, and leads north 12 mi (19 km) to Bonifay along Interstate 10 and southwest 18 mi (29 km) to Ebro. Another more local road, Florida State Road 277, begins in the city and leads northeast 16 mi (26 km) to Chipley, the Washington County seat.

According to the United States Census Bureau, the city has a total area of 4.7 square miles (12 km^{2}), all land.

=== Climate ===
The climate in this area is characterized by hot, humid summers and generally mild winters. According to the Köppen climate classification, the City of Vernon has a humid subtropical climate zone (Cfa).

== Demographics ==
Historical population
Census	Pop.	Note	%±
1900	141		—
1930	331		—
1940	539		62.8%
1950	610		13.2%
1960	624		2.3%
1970	691		10.7%
1980	885		28.1%
1990	778		−12.1%
2000	743		−4.5%
2010	687		−7.5%
2020	732		6.6%
U.S. Decennial Census

=== 2010 and 2020 census ===
Vernon racial composition (Hispanics excluded from racial categories) (NH = Non-Hispanic)
Race	Pop 2010	Pop 2020	% 2010	% 2020
White (NH)	524	523	76.27%	71.45%
Black or African American (NH)	96	101	13.97%	13.80%
Native American or Alaska Native (NH)	24	22	3.49%	3.01%
Asian (NH)	2	3	0.29%	0.41%
Pacific Islander or Native Hawaiian (NH)	1	1	0.15%	0.14%
Some other race (NH)	1	7	0.15%	0.96%
Two or more races/Multiracial (NH)	12	46	1.75%	6.28%
Hispanic or Latino (any race)	27	29	3.93%	3.96%
Total	687	732		

As of the 2020 United States census, there were 732 people, 288 households, and 163 families residing in the city.

As of the 2010 United States census, there were 687 people, 462 households, and 306 families residing in the city.

=== 2000 census ===
As of the census of 2000, there were 743 people, 296 households, and 206 families residing in the city. The population density was 157.3 inhabitants per square mile (60.7/km^{2}). There were 372 housing units at an average density of 78.8 per square mile (30.4/km^{2}). The racial makeup of the city was 77.25% White, 15.75% African American, 2.42% Native American, 0.67% Asian, 0.13% from other races, and 3.77% from two or more races. Hispanic of any race were 1.48% of the population.

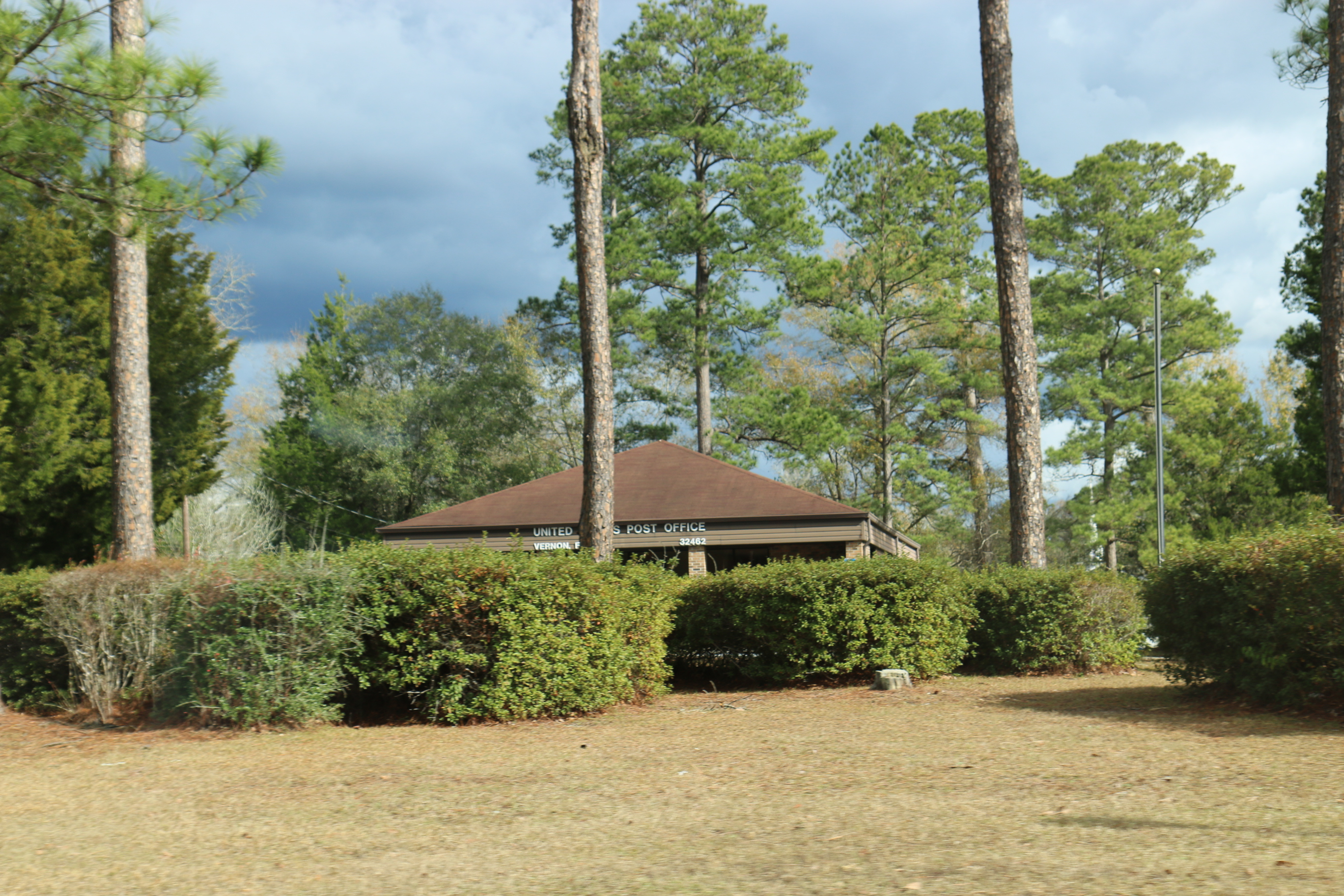
Vernon Post Office

There were 296 households, out of which 29.7% had children under the age of 18 living with them, 50.3% were married couples living together, 16.9% had a female householder with no husband present, and 30.4% were non-families. 27.7% of all households were made up of individuals, and 16.6% had someone living alone who was 65 years of age or older. The average household size was 2.38 and the average family size was 2.80.

In the city the population was spread out, with 27.6% under the age of 18, 7.9% from 18 to 24, 24.2% from 25 to 44, 23.7% from 45 to 64, and 16.6% who were 65 years of age or older. The median age was 36 years. For every 100 females, there were 83.5 males. For every 100 females age 18 and over, there were 87.5 males.

The median income for a household in the city was $21,176, and the median income for a family was $24,196. Males had a median income of $20,000 versus $15,938 for females. The per capita income for the city was $11,869. About 21.7% of families and 28.5% of the population were below the poverty line, including 48.8% of those under age 18 and 28.1% of those age 65 or over.

== Education ==
The following public schools within the city are operated by the Washington County School District: The district includes the entire county.

- Vernon Elementary School
- Vernon Middle School
- Vernon High School
