= Ebro, Florida =

- Town
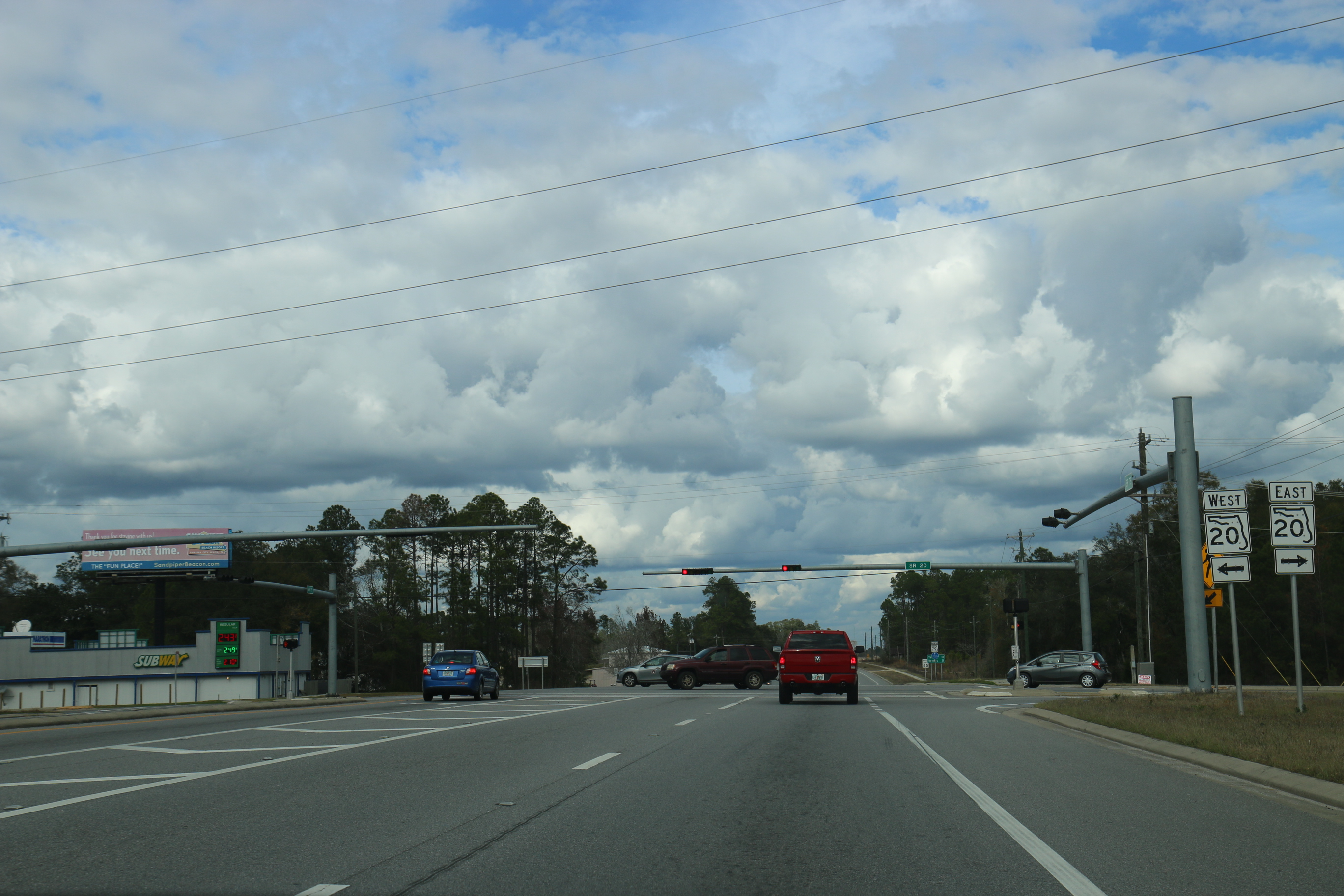
- Looking northerly at the intersection of State Road 20 and State Road 79 in Ebro

- Location in Washington County and the state of Florida
- Coordinates: 30°26′18″N 85°52′28″W
- Country: United States
- State: Florida
- County: Washington
- Settled: 1825
- Incorporated: 1967
- Named after: Ebro River

Government
  - Type: Mayor-Council
  - Mayor: David Evans
  - Council President: Gina Rutherford
  - Councilmembers: Regina Kincaid, Charles Scott, and Sally Young
  - Town Clerk: Linda S. Marlow
  - Town Attorney: Richard Kerry Adkison

Area
  - Total: 4.83 sq mi (12.51 km^{2})
  - Land: 4.73 sq mi (12.24 km^{2})
  - Water: 0.10 sq mi (0.27 km^{2})
- Elevation: 72 ft (22 m)

Population (2020)
  - Total: 237
  - Density: 50.2/sq mi (19.37/km^{2})
- Time zone: UTC-6 (Central (CST))
  - Summer (DST): UTC-5 (CDT)
- ZIP code: 32437
- Area code(s): 850, 448
- FIPS code: 12-19725
- GNIS feature ID: 2406419

Ebro is a town in Washington County, Florida, United States. The town is part of the Florida Panhandle, and located in North Florida. As of the 2020 census, Ebro had a population of 237. It is part of the Panama City—Panama City Beach, Florida Metropolitan Statistical Area.

== Etymology ==
The Town of Ebro is believed to have been named by the Spaniards during the Spanish Florida era, after the Ebro River in Spain.

== Geography ==
Ebro is the closest municipality to Northwest Florida Beaches International Airport.

Florida State Roads 20 and 79 are the main roads through the town. FL-79 runs from north to south to the east of the town, leading north 31 mi (50 km) to Bonifay along Interstate 10 and south 16 mi (26 km) to U.S. Route 98 near Panama City Beach. FL-20 runs from west to east through the center of town, leading east 51 mi (82 km) to Blountstown and west 17 mi (27 km) to Freeport.

According to the United States Census Bureau, the town has a total area of 3.2 square miles (8.3 km^{2}). 3.2 square miles (8.3 km^{2}) of it is land and 0.1 square miles (0.26 km^{2}) of it (1.56%) is water.

=== Climate ===
The climate in this area is characterized by hot, humid summers and generally mild winters. According to the Köppen climate classification, the Town of Ebro has a humid subtropical climate zone (Cfa).

== Demographics ==
Historical population
Census	Pop.	Note	%±
1970	125		—
1980	233		86.4%
1990	255		9.4%
2000	250		−2.0%
2010	270		8.0%
2020	237		−12.2%
U.S. Decennial Census

=== 2010 and 2020 census ===
Ebro racial composition (Hispanics excluded from racial categories) (NH = Non-Hispanic)
Race	Pop 2010	Pop 2020	% 2010	% 2020
White (NH)	221	200	81.85%	84.39%
Black or African American (NH)	3	5	1.11%	2.11%
Native American or Alaska Native (NH)	15	9	5.56%	3.80%
Asian (NH)	1	0	0.37%	0.00%
Pacific Islander or Native Hawaiian (NH)	0	0	0.00%	0.00%
Some other race (NH)	0	0	0.00%	0.00%
Two or more races/Multiracial (NH)	23	15	8.52%	6.33%
Hispanic or Latino (any race)	7	8	2.59%	3.38%
Total	270	237		

As of the 2020 United States census, there were 237 people, 103 households, and 65 families residing in the town.

As of the 2010 United States census, there were 270 people, 109 households, and 86 families residing in the town.

=== 2000 census ===
As of the census of 2000, there were 250 people, 102 households, and 63 families residing in the town. The population density was 79.4 inhabitants per square mile (30.7/km^{2}). There were 116 housing units at an average density of 36.8 per square mile (14.2/km^{2}). The racial makeup of the town was 73.60% White, 3.60% African American, 6.40% Native American, 0.40% Pacific Islander, 0.40% from other races, and 15.60% from two or more races. Hispanic or Latino of any race were 4.40% of the population.

In 2000, there were 102 households, out of which 33.3% had children under the age of 18 living with them, 47.1% were married couples living together, 10.8% had a female householder with no husband present, and 38.2% were non-families. 32.4% of all households were made up of individuals, and 9.8% had someone living alone who was 65 years of age or older. The average household size was 2.45 and the average family size was 3.10.

In 2000, in the town, the population was spread out, with 23.2% under the age of 18, 12.0% from 18 to 24, 29.2% from 25 to 44, 27.6% from 45 to 64, and 8.0% who were 65 years of age or older. The median age was 36 years. For every 100 females, there were 98.4 males. For every 100 females age 18 and over, there were 102.1 males.

In 2000, the median income for a household in the town was $28,750, and the median income for a family was $40,833. Males had a median income of $33,333 versus $25,208 for females. The per capita income for the town was $14,504. About 20.6% of families and 21.0% of the population were below the poverty line, including 22.6% of those under the age of eighteen and 25.0% of those 65 or over.

== Images ==
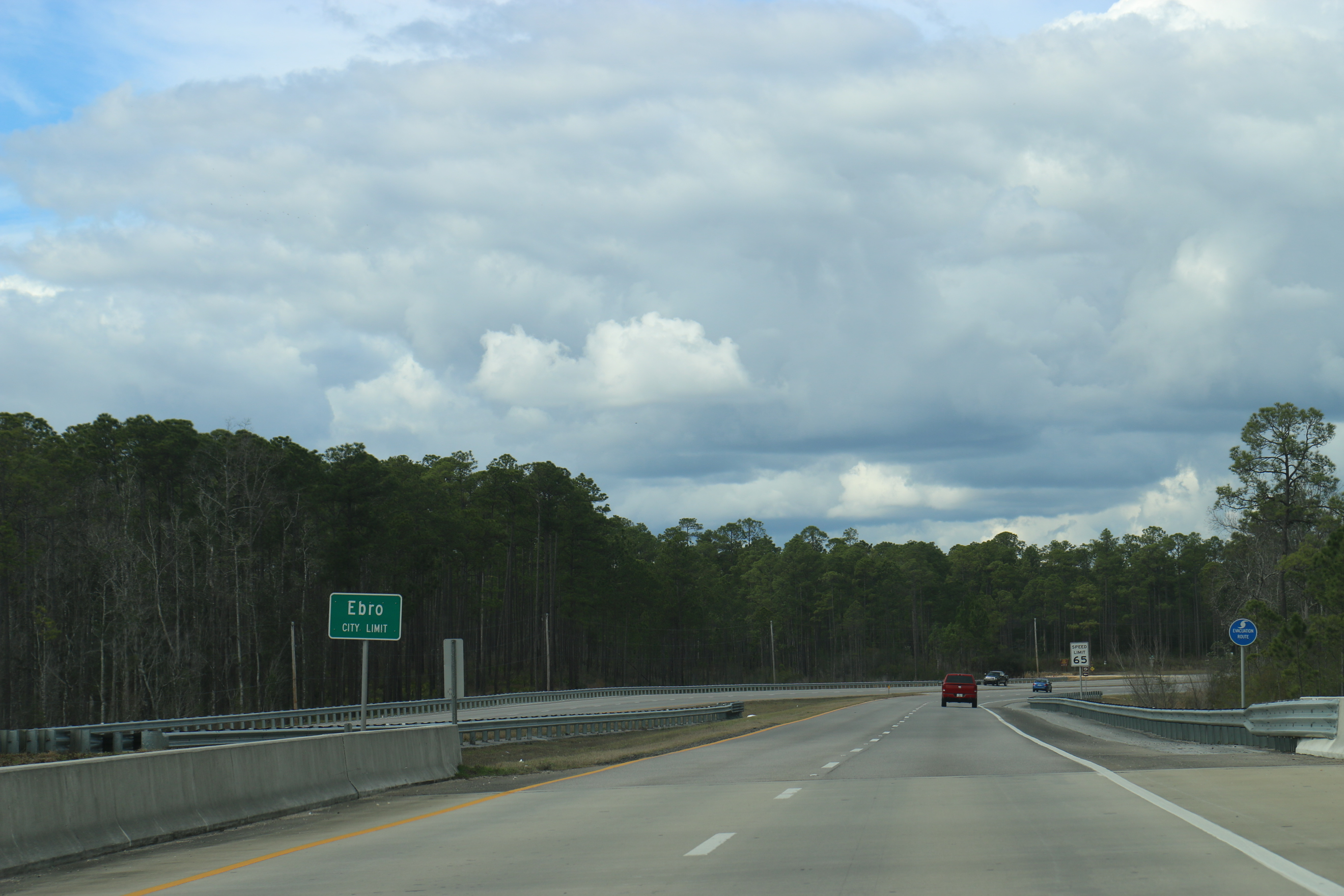
Sign for Ebro on State Route 79

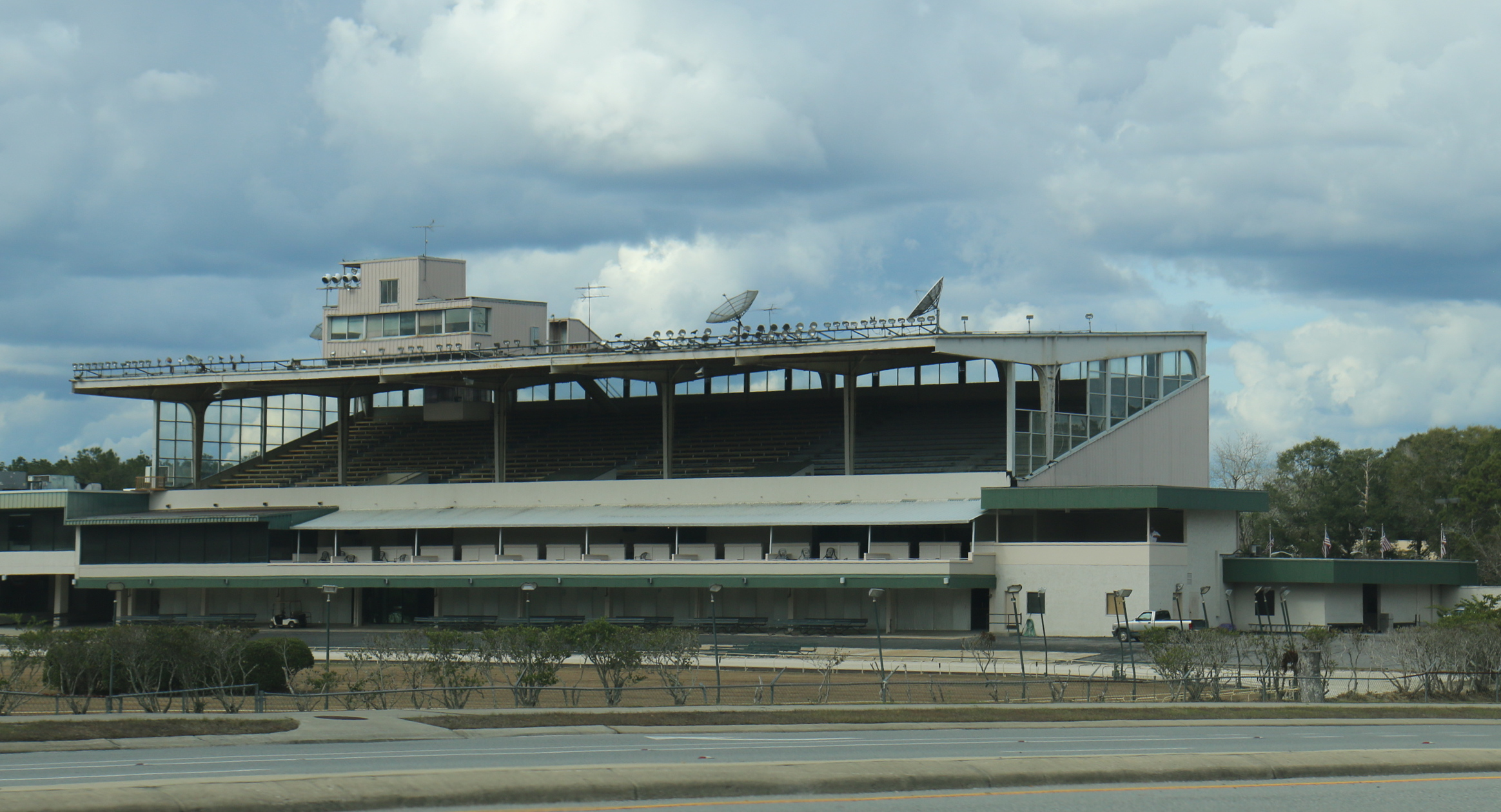
Ebro Greyhound Park
