= Washington County, Florida =

County in Florida, United States

- County
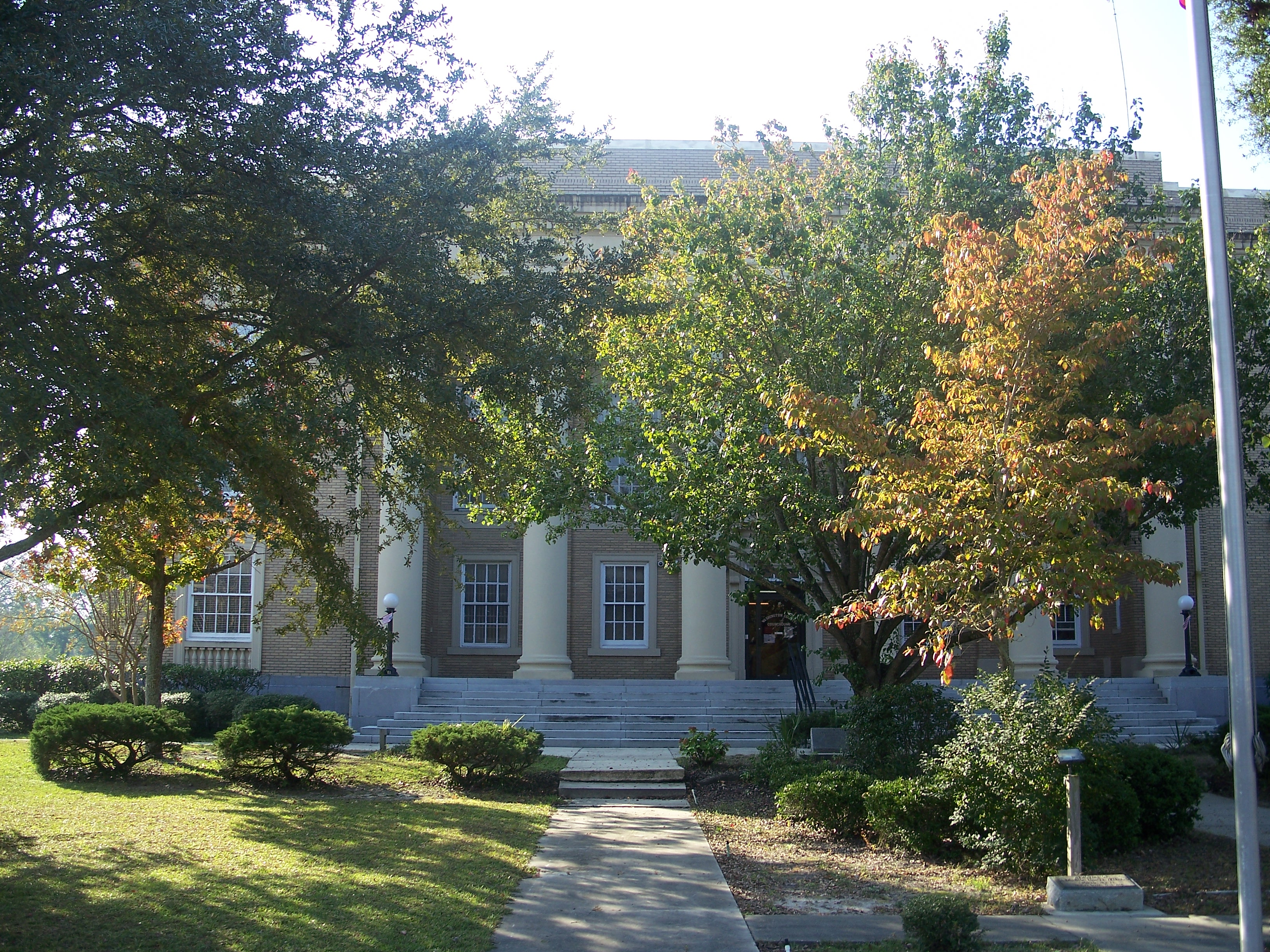
- Washington County Courthouse

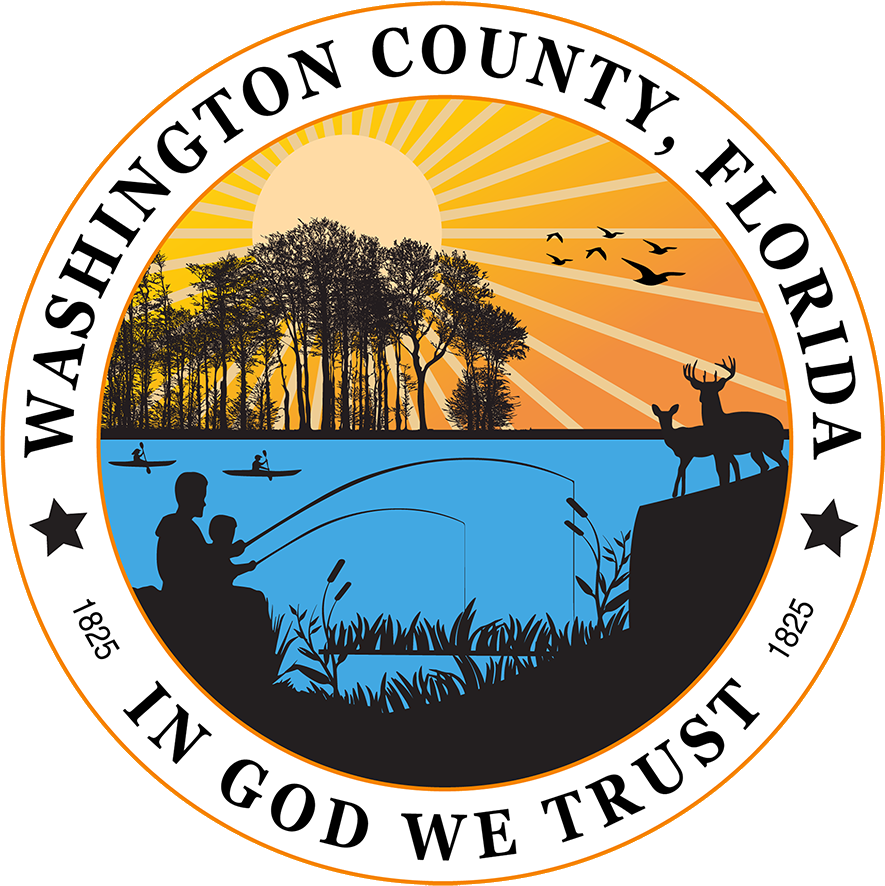
- Seal

- Location within the U.S. state of Florida
- Coordinates: 30°37′N 85°40′W
- Country: United States
- State: Florida
- Founded: December 9, 1825
- Named for: George Washington
- Seat: Chipley
- Largest city: Chipley

Area
  - Total: 616 sq mi (1,600 km^{2})
  - Land: 583 sq mi (1,510 km^{2})
  - Water: 33 sq mi (85 km^{2}) 5.4%

Population (2020)
  - Total: 25,318
  - Estimate (2025): 26,695 ▲
  - Density: 43.4/sq mi (16.8/km^{2})
- Time zone: UTC−6 (Central)
  - Summer (DST): UTC−5 (CDT)
- Congressional district: 2nd
- Website: www.washingtonfl.com

Washington County is a county located in the northwestern part of the U.S. state of Florida, in the Panhandle. As of the 2020 census, the population was 25,318. Its county seat is Chipley. Washington County is included in the Panama City, Florida metropolitan area.

== History ==
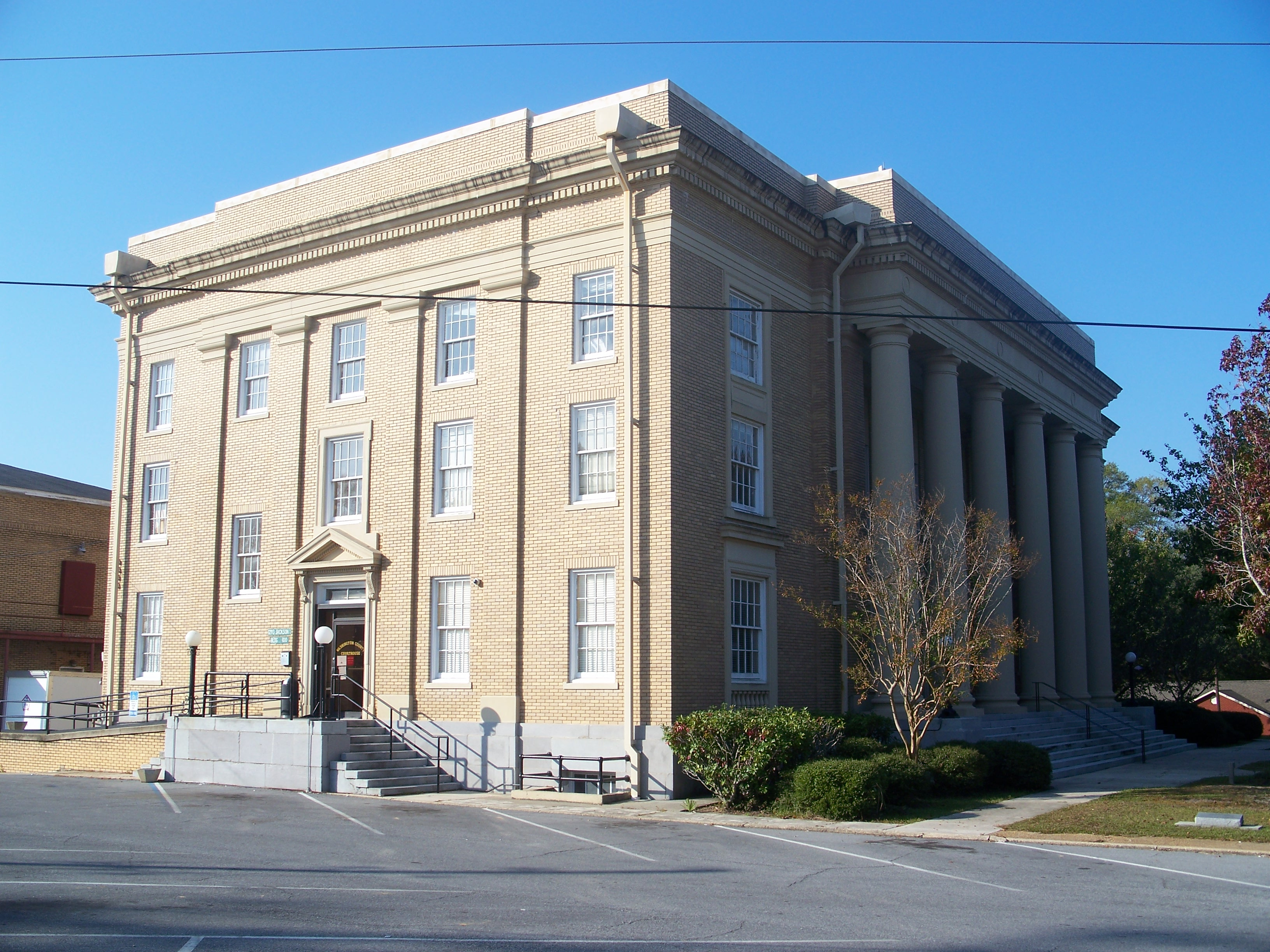
Washington County Courthouse in Chipley

Washington County was created in 1825, and was nearly twice the size of the State of Delaware, stretching all the way to the Gulf of Mexico. After a century of boundary shifts, the county, with over 382,000 acres (1,546 km^{2}) of rolling hills covered in thick, stately pines and mixed hardwood forests, now covers a large portion of the central Florida Panhandle.

Over a span of more than 150 years, Washington County has seen Native American, Spanish and English cultural influences. The county's historical lore is rich with stories of the exploits of Andrew Jackson. There are numerous Native American mounds and evidence of strong settlements still being discovered.

Named after George Washington, the first US president, the area was first settled by those seeking both economic and political freedom in this frontier land of vast timber and mineral resources. Inland waterway transportation brought about heavy river settlements. The arrival of railroads in the late 1800s boosted economic, social and political developments.

Vernon, the geographical center of the county, is named for George Washington's Virginia home, Mt. Vernon. The pioneer town was also the site of a major Indian settlement.

The county courthouse was located in Vernon during the early part of this century, until a railroad town in northeastern Washington County, Chipley, became the new and present county seat in 1927.

Washington County was once a dry county, meaning that the sale of alcoholic beverages was banned in the county. In January 2022, this restriction was removed following a voter referendum in which about two-thirds of voters supported the removal.

== Geography ==
According to the U.S. Census Bureau, the county has a total area of 616 square miles (1,600 km^{2}), of which 583 square miles (1,510 km^{2}) is land and 33 square miles (85 km^{2}) (5.4%) is water.

The county became part of the Panama City metropolitan area in 2023.

=== Adjacent counties ===
- Holmes County, Florida - north
- Jackson County, Florida - northeast
- Bay County, Florida - south
- Walton County, Florida - west

== Demographics ==
Historical population
Census	Pop.	Note	%±
1830	978		—
1840	859		−12.2%
1850	1,950		127.0%
1860	2,154		10.5%
1870	2,302		6.9%
1880	4,089		77.6%
1890	6,426		57.2%
1900	10,154		58.0%
1910	16,403		61.5%
1920	11,828		−27.9%
1930	12,180		3.0%
1940	12,302		1.0%
1950	11,888		−3.4%
1960	11,249		−5.4%
1970	11,453		1.8%
1980	14,509		26.7%
1990	16,919		16.6%
2000	20,973		24.0%
2010	24,896		18.7%
2020	25,318		1.7%
2025 (est.)	26,695	▲	5.4%
U.S. Decennial Census; 1790-1960 1900-1990; 1990-2000 2010-2015 2019

=== Racial and ethnic composition ===
Washington County, Florida – Racial and ethnic composition Note: the US Census treats Hispanic/Latino as an ethnic category. This table excludes Latinos from the racial categories and assigns them to a separate category. Hispanics/Latinos may be of any race.
Race / Ethnicity (NH = Non-Hispanic)	Pop 1980	Pop 1990	Pop 2000	Pop 2010	Pop 2020	% 1980	% 1990	% 2000	% 2010	% 2020
White alone (NH)	11,998	13,933	16,876	19,551	19,484	82.69%	82.35%	80.47%	78.53%	76.96%
Black or African American alone (NH)	2,267	2,449	2,828	3,698	3,236	15.62%	14.47%	13.48%	14.85%	12.78%
Native American or Alaska Native alone (NH)	94	274	307	296	222	0.65%	1.62%	1.46%	1.19%	0.88%
Asian alone (NH)	16	81	71	131	132	0.11%	0.48%	0.34%	0.53%	0.52%
Native Hawaiian or Pacific Islander alone (NH)	x	x	13	15	28	x	x	0.06%	0.06%	0.11%
Other race alone (NH)	19	2	11	14	87	0.13%	0.01%	0.05%	0.06%	0.34%
Mixed race or Multiracial (NH)	x	x	384	458	1,205	x	x	1.83%	1.84%	4.76%
Hispanic or Latino (any race)	115	180	483	733	924	0.79%	1.06%	2.30%	2.94%	3.65%
Total	14,509	16,919	20,973	24,896	25,318	100.00%	100.00%	100.00%	100.00%	100.00%

=== 2020 census ===
As of the 2020 census, the county had a population of 25,318, with 9,124 households and 5,945 families residing in the county. The median age was 43.1 years; 20.3% of residents were under the age of 18 and 19.0% were 65 years of age or older. For every 100 females there were 113.5 males, and for every 100 females age 18 and over there were 115.6 males.

As of the 2020 census, the racial makeup of the county was 78.2% White, 13.0% Black or African American, 0.9% American Indian and Alaska Native, 0.5% Asian, 0.1% Native Hawaiian and Pacific Islander, 1.4% from some other race, and 5.9% from two or more races. Hispanic or Latino residents of any race comprised 3.6% of the population.

Less than 0.1% of residents lived in urban areas, while 100.0% lived in rural areas.

The 9,124 households included 29.6% with children under the age of 18 living in them. Of all households, 48.6% were married-couple households, 18.8% were households with a male householder and no spouse or partner present, and 26.6% were households with a female householder and no spouse or partner present. About 26.9% of all households were made up of individuals and 12.5% had someone living alone who was 65 years of age or older.

There were 10,846 housing units, of which 15.9% were vacant. Among occupied housing units, 77.4% were owner-occupied and 22.6% were renter-occupied. The homeowner vacancy rate was 1.6% and the rental vacancy rate was 9.8%.

=== 2000 census ===
As of the census of 2000, there were 20,973 people, 7,931 households, and 5,646 families residing in the county. The population density was 36 inhabitants per square mile (14/km^{2}). There were 9,503 housing units at an average density of 16 per square mile (6/km^{2}). The racial makeup of the county was 81.72% White, 13.69% Black or African American, 1.54% Native American, 0.36% Asian, 0.06% Pacific Islander, 0.58% from other races, and 2.05% from two or more races. 2.30% of the population were Hispanic or Latino of any race.

There were 7,931 households, out of which 30.30% had children under the age of 18 living with them, 56.20% were married couples living together, 11.40% had a female householder with no husband present, and 28.80% were non-families. 25.10% of all households were made up of individuals, and 12.00% had someone living alone who was 65 years of age or older. The average household size was 2.46 and the average family size was 2.93.

In the county, the population was spread out, with 23.40% under the age of 18, 7.70% from 18 to 24, 28.50% from 25 to 44, 24.70% from 45 to 64, and 15.70% who were 65 years of age or older. The median age was 39 years. For every 100 females there were 105.80 males. For every 100 females age 18 and over, there were 105.90 males.

The median income for a household in the county was $27,922, and the median income for a family was $33,057. Males had a median income of $26,597 versus $20,198 for females. The per capita income for the county was $14,980. About 15.40% of families and 19.20% of the population were below the poverty line, including 26.90% of those under age 18 and 19.40% of those age 65 or over.

== Education ==
The Washington County School District includes:

- Kate Smith Elementary School
- Vernon Elementary School
- Roulhac Middle School
- Vernon Middle School
- Chipley High School
- Vernon High School

It is the sole school district in the county.

=== Washington Public Library System ===
Washington County Public Library system has four branches:

- Washington County Public Library (Chipley Library)
- Sam Mitchell Public Library
- Wausau Public Library
- Sunny Hills Public Library

== Media ==
- The Washington County News
- Foster Folly News
- The Chipley Bugle

== Communities ==
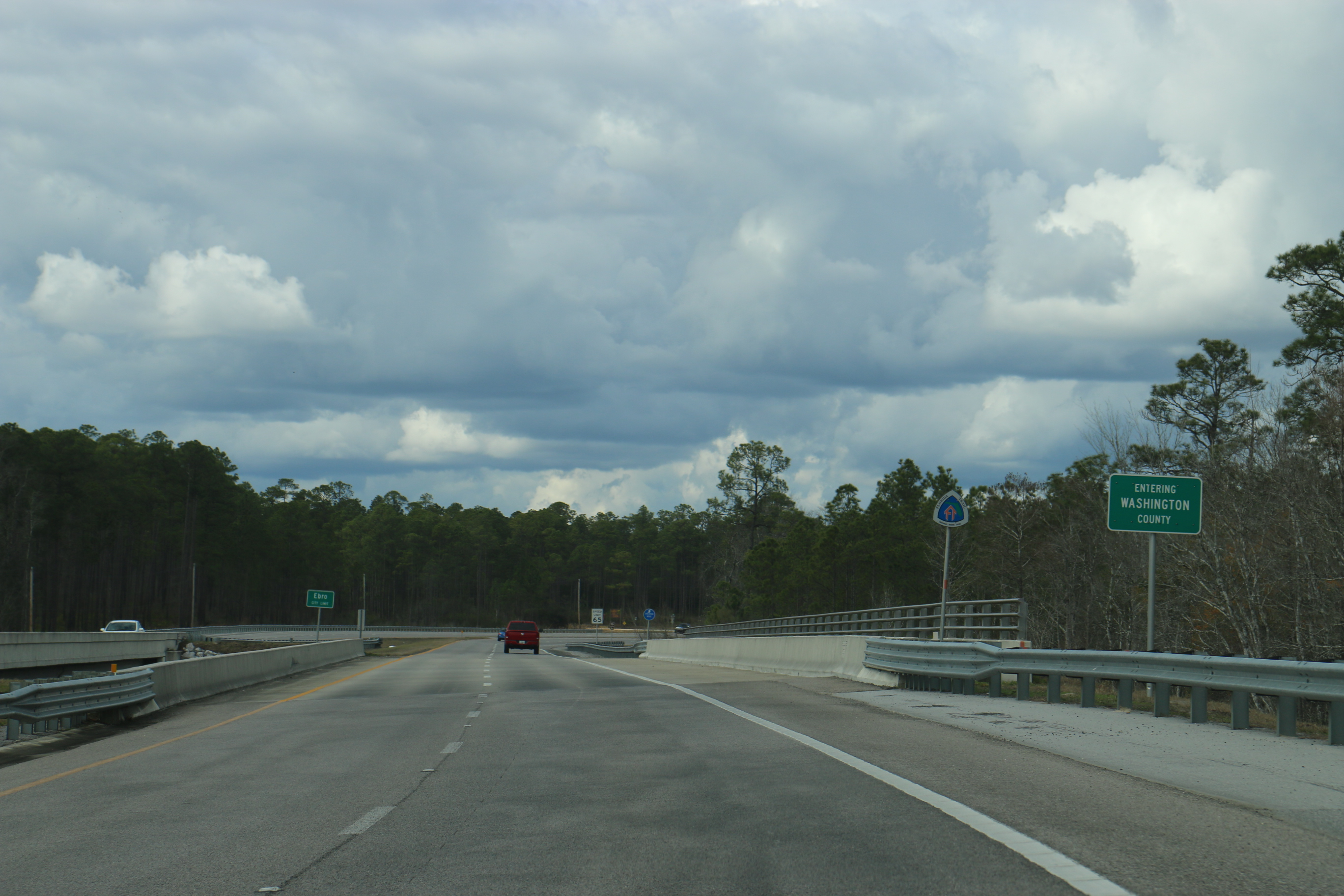
The Washington County sign at Ebro, Florida on Florida State Road 79

=== Cities ===
- Chipley
- Vernon

=== Towns ===
- Caryville
- Ebro
- Wausau

=== Unincorporated communities ===
- Crow
- Five Points
- Gilberts Mill
- Greenhead
- Hinson's Crossroads
- Holmes Valley
- New Hope
- Poplar Head
- Red Head
- Sunny Hills

== Transportation ==
=== Airports ===
- Washington County is served by Tri-County Airport, a general aviation airport 5.3 miles northwest of central Chipley. It has a 5398-foot runway, passenger terminal and two instrument approaches. Washington County appoints three of the nine-member board of directors which governs the airport.

=== Major highways ===
- I-10 (Interstate 10)
- US 90 (U.S. Highway 90)
- SR 20
- SR 77
- SR 79
- SR 273
- SR 277

== Politics ==
United States presidential election results for Washington County, Florida
Year	Republican		Democratic		Third party(ies)	
Year	No.	%	No.	%	No.	%
1904	202	26.03%	414	53.35%	160	20.62%
1908	288	24.64%	652	55.77%	229	19.59%
1912	82	7.61%	694	64.38%	302	28.01%
1916	159	15.85%	626	62.41%	218	21.73%
1920	307	25.37%	750	61.98%	153	12.64%
1924	206	24.76%	562	67.55%	64	7.69%
1928	1,672	69.72%	671	27.98%	55	2.29%
1932	345	12.46%	2,424	87.54%	0	0.00%
1936	486	17.51%	2,289	82.49%	0	0.00%
1940	643	25.14%	1,915	74.86%	0	0.00%
1944	507	22.98%	1,699	77.02%	0	0.00%
1948	297	13.43%	1,380	62.42%	534	24.15%
1952	1,100	32.71%	2,263	67.29%	0	0.00%
1956	1,027	32.18%	2,164	67.82%	0	0.00%
1960	1,230	36.96%	2,098	63.04%	0	0.00%
1964	2,725	64.50%	1,500	35.50%	0	0.00%
1968	528	10.71%	722	14.64%	3,682	74.66%
1972	3,777	86.11%	606	13.82%	3	0.07%
1976	2,313	38.58%	3,566	59.47%	117	1.95%
1980	3,251	49.92%	3,110	47.75%	152	2.33%
1984	4,608	70.62%	1,916	29.36%	1	0.02%
1988	4,374	66.64%	2,144	32.66%	46	0.70%
1992	3,695	46.94%	2,544	32.32%	1,632	20.73%
1996	3,524	44.83%	2,992	38.06%	1,345	17.11%
2000	4,995	62.24%	2,798	34.86%	233	2.90%
2004	7,369	71.09%	2,912	28.09%	85	0.82%
2008	8,178	73.23%	2,863	25.64%	126	1.13%
2012	8,038	72.79%	2,820	25.54%	184	1.67%
2016	8,637	77.04%	2,264	20.19%	310	2.77%
2020	9,876	80.06%	2,347	19.03%	112	0.91%
2024	10,370	82.14%	2,140	16.95%	115	0.91%

== See also ==
- Buckley v. Haddock (2008)
- National Register of Historic Places listings in Washington County, Florida
