= Greenhead, Florida =

- Unincorporated community
- Nickname: Community of Mystery
- Location within Florida
- Coordinates: 30°30′17″N 85°39′36″W
- Country: United States
- State: Florida
- County: Washington
- Elevation: 144 ft (44 m)

Population
  - Total: 100
- Time zone: UTC-6 (Central (CST))
  - Summer (DST): UTC-5 (CDT)
- ZIP code: 32428
- Area code: 850
- GNIS feature ID: 295323

Greenhead is an unincorporated community in Washington County, Florida, United States. It is located along State Road 77, and is north of Sand Hills.

Greenhead is the location of the deed-restricted Grassy Pond Community, surrounding Grassy Pond and is governed by a homeowners' association.
