= Panama City metropolitan area, Florida =

Statistical area in Florida, USA

Panama City–Panama City Beach metropolitan area
- Metropolitan Statistical Area
- Panama City–Panama City Beach, FL; Metropolitan Statistical Area
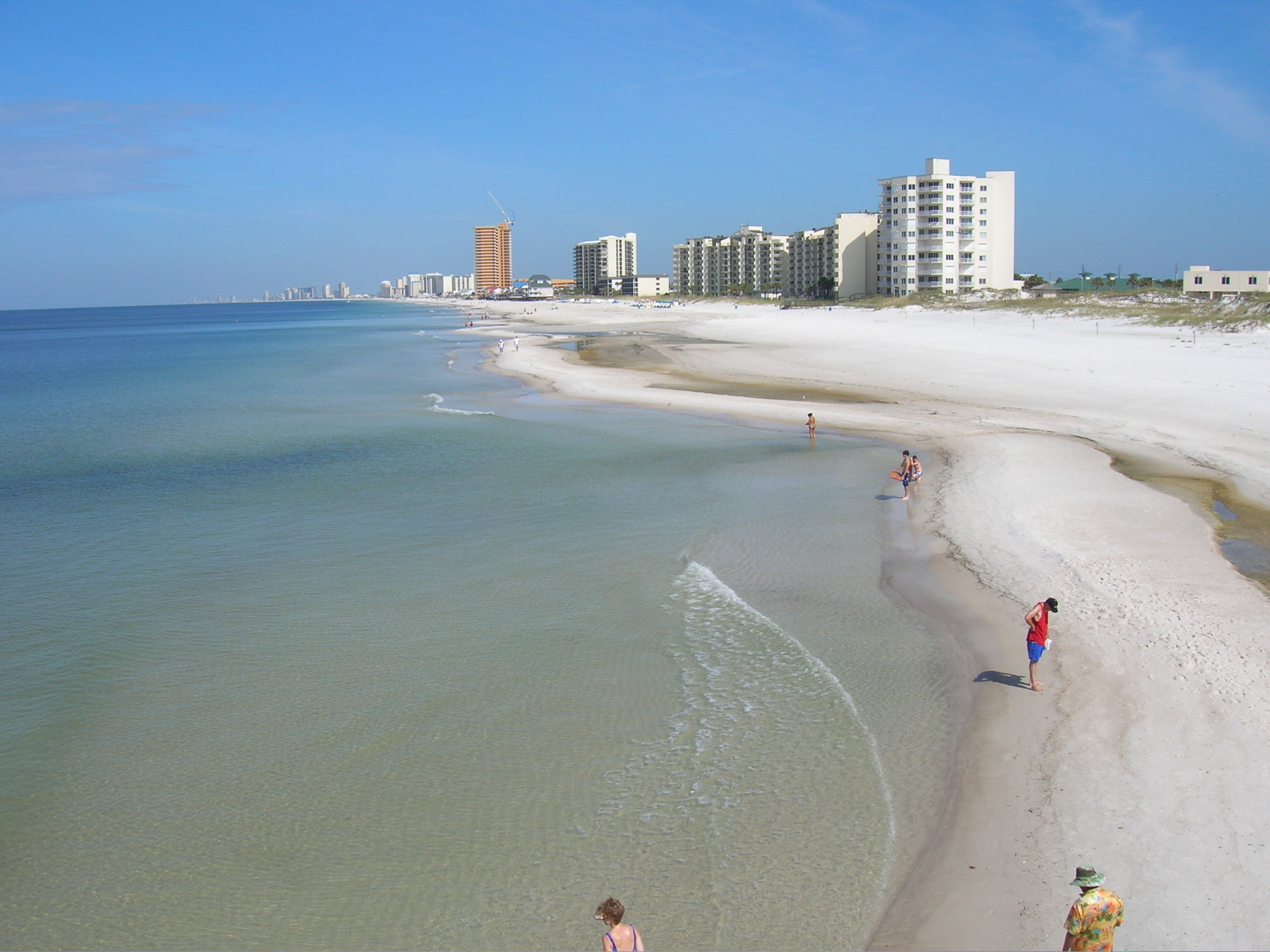
- View of the beach looking northwest from St. Andrews State Park
Interactive Map of Florida Panhandle
with inset of Panama City MSA
Panama City
Panama City Beach
Pensacola–Ferry Pass–Brent, FL MSA
Crestview–Ft. Walton Beach–Destin, FL MSA
Panama City–Panama City Beach, FL MSA
- Country: United States
- State(s): Florida
- Principal cities: Panama City
- Other cities: Panama City Beach; Lynn Haven

Population (2020)
  - Total: 200,534
- Time zone: UTC-6 (CST)
  - Summer (DST): UTC-5 (CDT)

The Panama City–Panama City Beach, Florida Metropolitan Statistical Area is a metropolitan statistical area (MSA) defined by the U.S. Office of Management and Budget. As of 2023, the MSA includes Bay and Washington counties, and the principal cities of Panama City and Panama City Beach. The two-county MSA had a population of 200,534 at the 2020 United States Census. The MSA was first defined in 1977 as the Panama City, Florida Standard SMA, consisting of Bay County. It was renamed Panama City-Lynn Haven, Florida MSA in 2003, and then as Panama City-Lynn Haven-Panama City Beach, Florida MSA in 2008. Gulf County was added to the MSA in 2013, and the MSA was named Panama City, Florida MSA. Gulf County was removed from the MSA in 2018. Washington County was added to the MSA in 2023, and the name changed to Panama City-Panama City Beach, Florida MSA.

== Cities ==
- Panama City
- Lynn Haven
- Panama City Beach
- Upper Grand Lagoon
- Callaway
- Springfield
- Parker

== See also ==
- Florida statistical areas
