= National Register of Historic Places listings in Washington County, Florida =

Location of Washington County in Florida

This is a list of the National Register of Historic Places listings in Washington County, Florida.

This is intended to be a complete list of the properties and districts on the National Register of Historic Places in Washington County, Florida, United States. The locations of National Register properties and districts for which the latitude and longitude coordinates are included below, may be seen in a map.

There are 5 properties and districts listed on the National Register in the county.

This National Park Service list is complete through NPS recent listings posted May 1, 2026.

Contents: Counties in Florida (non-linked contain no National Register listings)
Alachua - Baker - Bay - Bradford - Brevard - Broward - Calhoun - Charlotte - Citrus - Clay - Collier - Columbia - DeSoto - Dixie - Duval - Escambia - Flagler - Franklin - Gadsden - Gilchrist - Glades - Gulf - Hamilton - Hardee - Hendry - Hernando - Highlands - Hillsborough (Tampa) - Holmes - Indian River - Jackson - Jefferson - Lafayette - Lake - Lee - Leon - Levy - Liberty - Madison - Manatee - Marion - Martin - Miami-Dade (Miami) - Monroe - Nassau - Okaloosa - Okeechobee - Orange - Osceola - Palm Beach - Pasco - Pinellas - Polk - Putnam - St. Johns - St. Lucie - Santa Rosa - Sarasota - Seminole - Sumter - Suwannee - Taylor - Union - Volusia - Wakulla - Walton - Washington

== Current listings ==
	Name on the Register	Image	Date listed	Location	City or town	Description
1	Chipley City Hall	Chipley City Hall	March 30, 2005 (#05000216)	672 Fifth Street. 30°46′53″N 85°32′25″W	Chipley	
2	Dr. James B. and Virginia Craven House		January 21, 2020 (#100004889)	912 FL 277; 30°45′55″N 85°34′11″W	Chipley	
3	Moss Hill Church	Moss Hill Church	November 7, 1983 (#83003554)	Vernon-Greenhead Road; 30°35′02″N 85°40′40″W	Vernon	
4	South Third Street Historic District	South Third Street Historic District	February 21, 1989 (#89000045)	South Third Street between Wells Avenue and South Boulevard; 30°46′29″N 85°32′32″W	Chipley	
5	Woman's Club of Chipley	Woman's Club of Chipley	December 8, 1997 (#97001514)	607 Fifth Street; 30°47′07″N 85°32′24″W	Chipley	Part of the Clubhouses of Florida's Woman's Clubs MPS

== See also ==
- List of National Historic Landmarks in Florida
- National Register of Historic Places listings in Florida
