= William Chipley =

William Chipley may refer to:

- William Dudley Chipley, American railroad executive and politician
- William Stout Chipley, American psychologist
- Bill Chipley, American football player and coach
