= Ralph C. Carter =

American politician

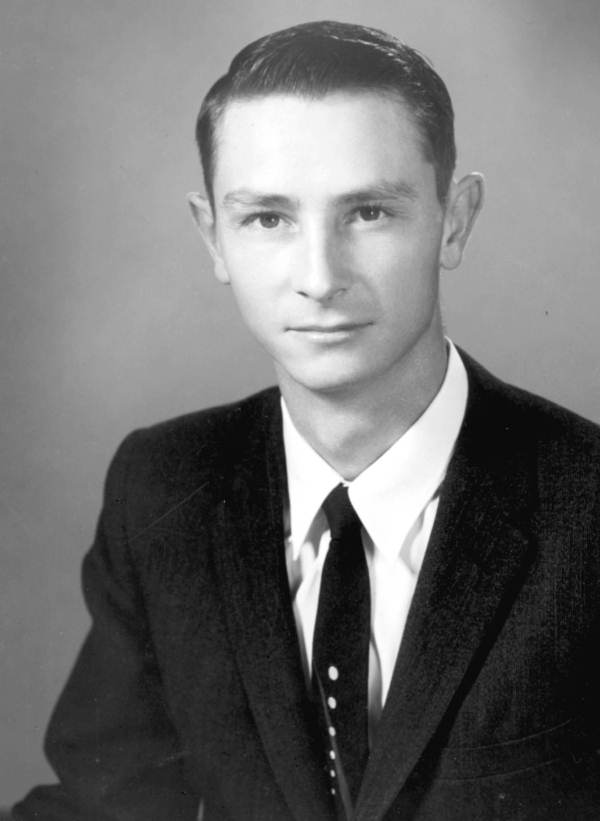
- Carter in 1961

Member of the Florida House of Representatives from Washington County
- In office 1961–1966

Personal details
- Born: June 25, 1932 Geneva, Alabama, U.S.
- Died: September 4, 2007 (aged 75)
- Party: Democratic
- Spouse: Carolyn Gunter
- Children: 3

Ralph C. Carter (June 25, 1932 – September 4, 2007) was an American politician. He served as a Democratic member of the Florida House of Representatives.

== Life and career ==
Carter was born in Geneva, Alabama, the son of Annie Elizabeth Cronin and Ralph Clarence Carter. He attended Chipley High School.

In 1961, Carter was elected to the Florida House of Representatives, serving until 1966.

Carter died in September 2007 at the age of 75.
