= Roulhac High School =

Location
- 101 N Pecan Street; Chipley, Florida; U.S.
- 30°46′57″N 85°32′00″W

Information
- Former name: Chipley Colored School, Washington County Colored School
- Type: Public, segregated
- Established: 1938; 88 years ago
- Founder: T. J Roulhac
- Closed: 1968; 58 years ago
- School board: Washington County School Board
- Accreditation: Southern Association of Schools and Colleges

T. J. Roulhac High School was a public secondary school in Chipley, Florida. It served as the high school for black students until the public schools were integrated in 1968.

== History ==
Chipley Colored School was founded in 1938. It was for a short time known as Washington County Colored School. Two thirds of the funding came from the Jeanes Foundation program known as the Negro Rural School Fund, and one third from the Washington County School Board. It was housed in various churches.

In 1941, the school was renamed for its founder and first principal T. J. Roulhac.

The existing buildings were constructed starting in 1950.

In 1968 with desegregation, grades nine through twelve were discontinued and the school became Roulhac Middle School. Roulhac students were transferred to Chipley High School, and some to Vernon High School At that time, graduating classes consisted of approximately 10 students.

In 2000, Roulhac Middle School moved to a new campus on Brickyard Road.

=== Founder and namesake ===
In 1913 T.J. Roulhac, a man with no formal training, became the supervisor of Washington County's black schools. In 1938, the school expanded to include high school, and Roulhac became the principal.

== Notable people ==
Artis Gilmore attended Roulhac before transferring to Chipley High School for one week, then went to George Washington Carver High School in Dothan, Alabama his senior year.

E. Lilyan Spencer, a national tennis champion, was a girls' basketball coach and official at the school in 1954.
