= E. Lilyan Spencer =

American tennis player

- Born: December 16, 1906 Tallahassee, Florida, U.S.
- Died: January 24, 1957 (aged 50) Tallahassee, Florida, U.S.

Eldis Lilyan Spencer (December 16, 1906 – January 24, 1957) was an American tennis player, basketball coach, teacher and school administrator from the Villa Mitchell neighborhood of Tallahassee, Florida.

Spencer blazed trails as a tennis player, winning multiple Florida Tennis Association matches throughout the 1930s. She won the women's doubles national championship title at the 1937 American Tennis Association Nationals tournament, held at Tuskegee Institute. Spencer and doubles partner Bertha Isaacs, ended the eight-year reign of Ora Washington and Lulu Ballard. As of 1954, she was the only Florida woman to have won honors in national competition, according to the St. Petersburg Times. Spencer was inducted into the National Black Tennis Hall of Fame as well as the Florida A&M University Sports Hall of Fame in 2025.

== Early life ==
E. Lilyan Spencer was born in 1906 in Tallahassee, Florida. While some sources record Spencer's birth year as 1905, her death certificate lists her date of birth as December 16, 1906. Spencer and her siblings attended Florida A&M University (FAMU); she graduated from FAMU (then FAMCEE) with a degree in mathematics with special certification in administration and supervision, according to the City of Tallahassee's Parks, Recreation and Neighborhood Affairs Department.

== Early career ==
Lilyan Spencer held the state women's singles crown for the Florida Tennis Association (FTA) for ten years without suffering a competitive defeat. At the height of her athletic acclaim, Spencer was effectively barred from playing in the U.S. National Championships, which is now known as the U.S. Open (tennis). Althea Gibson, a fellow graduate of Florida A&M, would go on to break the color barrier by competing in the U.S. Open in 1950.

Bertha Isaacs, a Bahamian-born athlete and politician, served as Spencer's doubles partner for both state and national tournaments. In August 1937, Spencer and Isaacs won a national championship at the 21st American Tennis Association Nationals, when they captured the women's doubles title. The tournament was held at Tuskegee Institute. Spencer's feat made her the only Florida woman to have won a national competition at that time.

== Professional career ==
In the late 1930s, Spencer began to focus her time and attention on improving the lives of young people in her hometown. She taught first through third grades at Richardson Elementary School in the Springhill community near today's Tallahassee International Airport. Richardson, where she also served as principal, was one of the many one-room rural schools in Leon County at that time for African-Americans.

In 1941, Lilyan Spencer became the principal of Bond Elementary School, which subsequently became Bond Junior High School. She was the first woman principal of an inner-city secondary school in Leon County's history. Spencer also taught math, served as athletic director, and coached basketball at Bond Junior High School, where her teams were recognized statewide. She was named the best basketball coach in Florida by the Florida Interscholastic Coaches Association in 1954.

In 1948, Bond School received connection to city water services, which greatly reduced the risk of health hazards due to the contamination of well water. Enrollment more than tripled to 650 students by the end of the decade, which necessitated the need for a new school plant. Spencer's girls’ basketball team, which she coached, received state championships during her tenure.

In 1949, a brick addition to Bond Subdivision School was completed at a cost of $125,000. This was a ten-room building which included classrooms, offices, supply and boiler rooms, as well as sanitation facilities. A six-classroom masonry addition was also planned for the school in 1950, which was dedicated in April 1951.

Spencer resigned the Bond principal's job in 1951, and was succeeded by Walton Solomon Seabrooks. She eventually coached girls basketball at Roulhac High School in Chipley, Florida.

== Community involvement ==
Spencer chaired the Negro Division of the March of Dimes representing the Bond neighborhood; often raising more than other divisions. She was committed to raising these funds for polio research, and focused her time on improving health outcomes and environmental conditions for her students. She attended a special school to broaden her knowledge of this disease. She also helped organize free medical exams for black children and advocated for youth sports. She was chair of the financial committee for Bond Community Credit Union, was chair of health and physical education for the Negro Pre-School Planning Conference for Leon County's African-American schools, and was chair of the women's day programs for Fountain Chapel A.M.E. Church.

== Personal life and final years ==
Spencer lived at 825 West Eugenia Street in Tallahassee in a home that has since been demolished. She married Jerry Lee Tinsley in Orlando, Florida on April 3, 1927, with the marriage ending in divorce in 1939. Though married to Tinsley, there is no indication that Spencer ever acknowledged the marriage publicly, with newspaper accounts referring to her during this time as "Miss" and only using her maiden name.

For a time, Spencer lived in Jacksonville and Orlando.

According to newspaper accounts, Spencer was hospitalized in 1956 for an undisclosed illness. She died on January 24, 1957, at the age of 50. Her funeral was held two days later and she was buried in Oakland Cemetery in an unmarked grave.

== Legacy and honors ==
Spencer's 1937 national tennis championship win is mentioned in an exhibit of the International Tennis Hall of Fame entitled: "Breaking the Barriers: The ATA and Black Tennis Pioneers." The exhibit chronicles "the incredible story of the talented players who were not allowed to compete in major tennis tournaments because of their race."

In 2025, renewed interest in Spencer's legacy led to her being announced as an inductee into the National Black Tennis Hall of Fame, as well as into the FAMU Sports Hall of Fame. Her biography states that she "was FAMU's greatest women's tennis player behind only Althea Gibson."

On November 16, 1996, E. Lilyan Spencer was honored in the naming of the Speed–Spencer–Stephens Park by Tallahassee city officials. She was recognized along with civil rights activist Daniel B. Speed and community leader D. Edwina Stephens for their "unselfish community service."

On January 24, 2025, 68 years after her death, Spencer's grave was marked with a headstone. The monument included a basketball, tennis racquet, and the Florida A&M University insignia.

On March 4, 2025, Campbell Street in Tallahassee, where the Bond Elementary School is located, was officially designated as E. Lilyan Spencer Memorial Way by the Tallahassee City Commission and Florida A&M University.

On April 5, 2025, an historical marker for Spencer was formally dedicated at the site of her former home, near the corner of Eugenia Street and FAMU Way.

On March 9, 2026, the Florida House of Representatives adopted House Resolution 8105, which "Recognizes life & legacy of E. Lilyan Spencer on 120th anniversary of her birth."
