= Washington County Courthouse (Florida) =

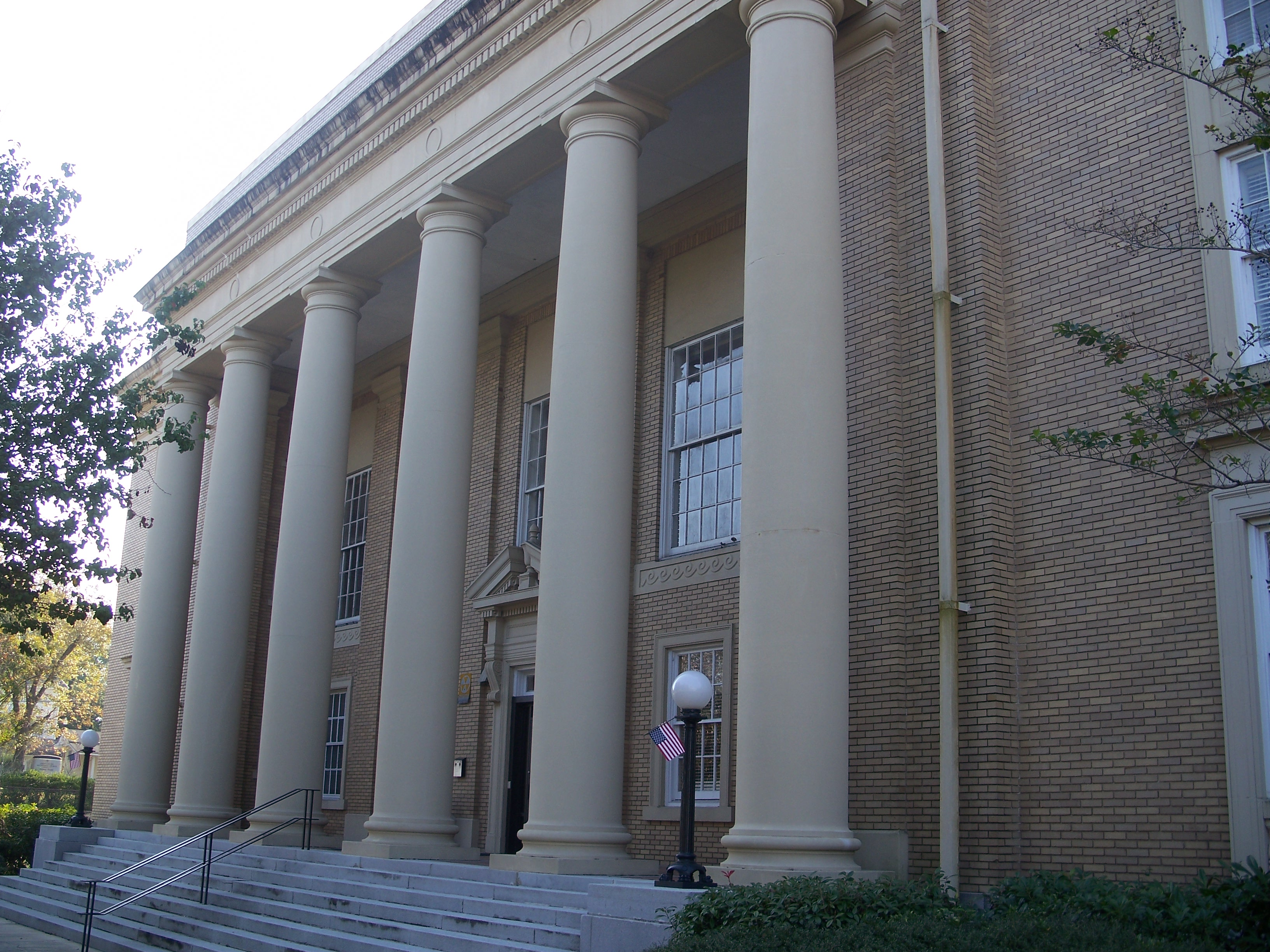
- Washington County Courthouse
- Interactive map of the Washington County Courthouse area

General information
- Architectural style: Classical Revival
- Location: Chipley, Florida, United States
- Coordinates: 30°46′45″N 85°32′29″W
- Completed: 1932
- Cost: $
- Client: Washington County

Design and construction
- Engineer: Builder:

The Washington County Courthouse was an historic brick courthouse building located in Chipley, Florida. It was built in 1932 in the Classical Revival style after Chipley won a 1927 referendum to move the county seat from Vernon.

In 1989, the Washington County Courthouse was listed in A Guide to Florida's Historic Architecture, published by the University of Florida Press.

The 1932 courthouse has since been demolished, due to damage at the base of the building and black mold. A new courthouse was constructed over a two-year period atop the site of the former building. The new courthouse was completed in 2016, and was open to the public in December 2016.
