= William Dudley Chipley =

Confederate Army officer and politician (1840–1897)

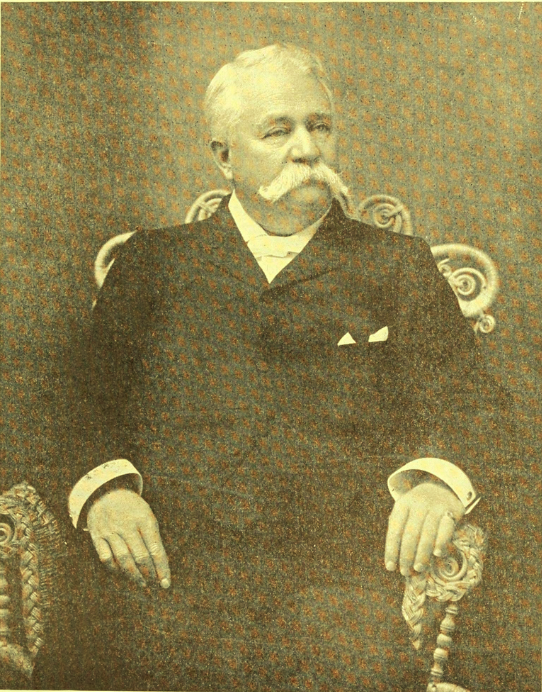
- Chipley in a 1904 publication

Member of the Florida Senate
- In office 1895–1896

Personal details
- Born: June 6, 1840 Columbus, Georgia, U.S.
- Died: December 1, 1897 (aged 57) Washington, D.C., U.S.
- Resting place: Columbus, Georgia, U.S.
- Spouse: Ann Elizabeth Billups
- Occupation: Railroad executive; politician

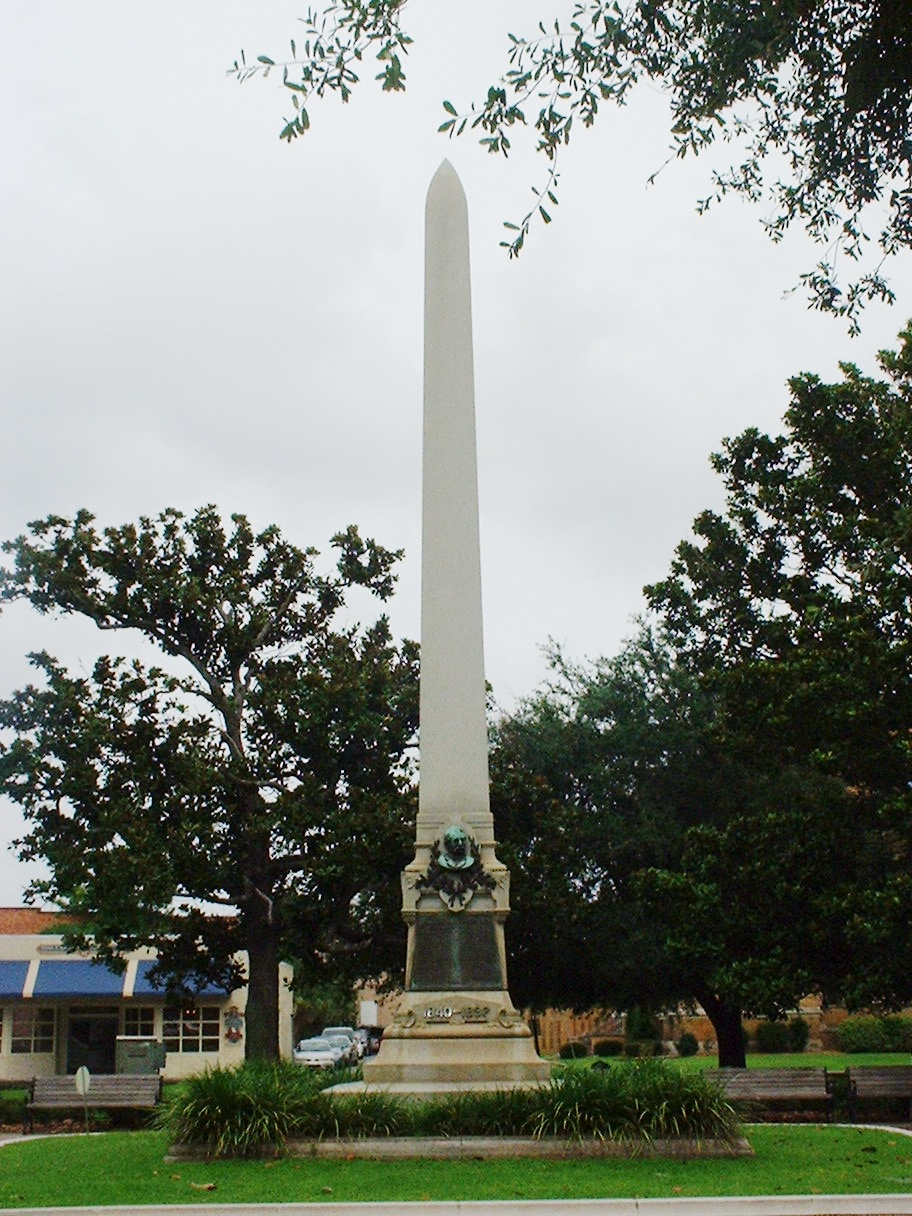
An obelisk dedicated to Chipley's memory in Plaza Ferdinand VII in Pensacola, Florida.

William Dudley Chipley (June 6, 1840 – December 1, 1897) was an American railroad executive and politician who was instrumental in the building of the Pensacola and Atlantic Railroad and was a tireless promoter of Pensacola, his adopted city, where he was elected to one term as mayor, and later to a term as Florida state senator.

Following the American Civil War, in 1868 Chipley was one of many men arrested in his hometown of Columbus, Georgia, on suspicion of participation in the murder of Radical Republican judge George W. Ashburn by the local Ku Klux Klan. However, the key witness, American soldier Charles Marshall, who confessed to being a participant at the murder, testified that a man of Chipley's size had been the leader outside but he could not state with certainty it was Chipley and added that he had "not had any acquaintance with Chipley".

In October 1868, Chipley along with M.M. Moore, J.S. Pemberton, Frank Gunby, and J. Gunby Jordan established Columbus, Georgia's first fire corporation, The Rescue Hook & Ladder Co.

In 1877, Chipley helped Texas Rangers and Florida law officers subdue and arrest outlaw John Wesley Hardin aboard a train in Pensacola. Hardin was subsequently returned to Texas, convicted on outstanding murder charges, and imprisoned.

== Early life ==
Chipley was born in Columbus, Georgia, but when he was four, his parents, Dr. William Stout Chipley and Elizabeth Fannin Chipley, returned to Lexington, Kentucky, where Chipley's grandfather, the Rev. Stephen Chipley, was one of the founding citizens of Lexington, Kentucky. Dr. Chipley was renowned for his work relating to brain diseases and held two jobs: a professor of medicine at Transylvania University and the warden of the Eastern Asylum for the Insane in Lexington.

He graduated from the Kentucky Military Institute and Transylvania University. Afterwards, he worked as a clerk for the T.H. Hunt & Co. in Louisville, Kentucky, which manufactured bags and rope.

== Military service ==
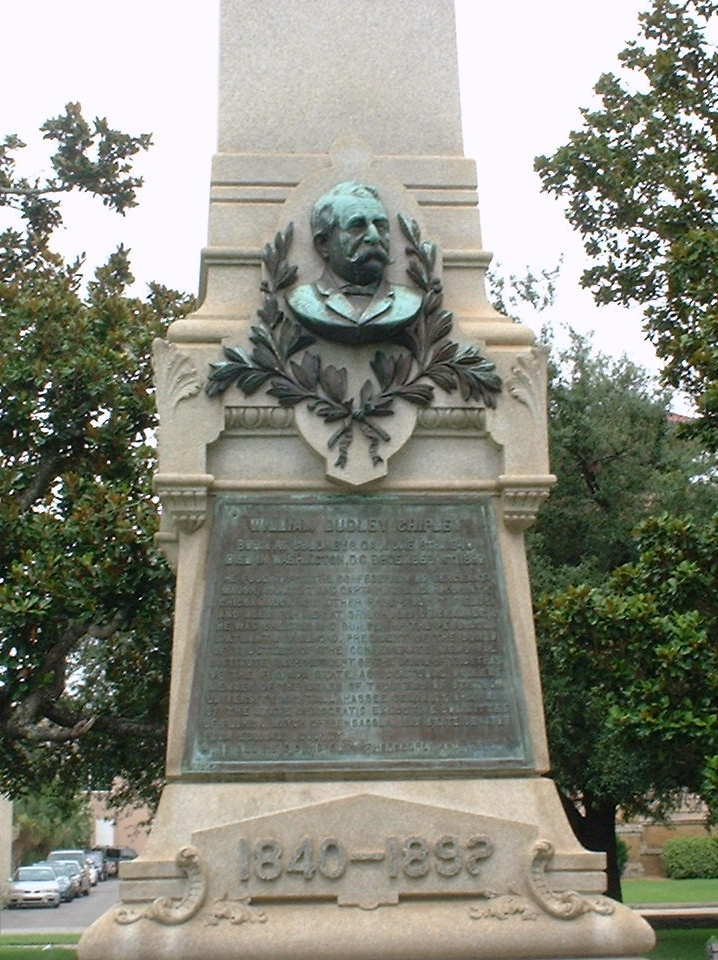
The base of the obelisk, with his biography inscribed.

When his employer, Thomas H. Hunt, raised a regiment to fight with the Confederacy, Chipley joined him, later becoming his Adjutant. This regiment became the 9th Kentucky Infantry Regiment, fighting for the Confederacy in the Civil War. He participated with his unit initially as Sergeant Major (Oct 1861) and then appointed 1st Lieutenant and Adjutant on March 1, 1863. He fought in several engagements with the Army of Tennessee, even after his mentor, Col. Hunt resigned in April 1863 to establish a business in Augusta to support his family. He was wounded at the battles of Shiloh, accidentally wounded at Corinth. He fought at Stones River, Jackson, and Chickamauga, where he was wounded again. He fought at Dalton, Rocky Face Gap, Resaca, Dallas, Atlanta, and finally taken prisoner at the Battle of Peachtree Creek near Atlanta, where he was serving as a Captain. As a prisoner of war, Chipley was transported to Johnson's Island on Lake Erie in Ohio, and was interned there until the war was over. In mid-1865, he settled in Columbus and married Ann Elizabeth Billups, the daughter of a prominent planter in Phenix City, Alabama, just across the Chattahoochee River from Columbus.

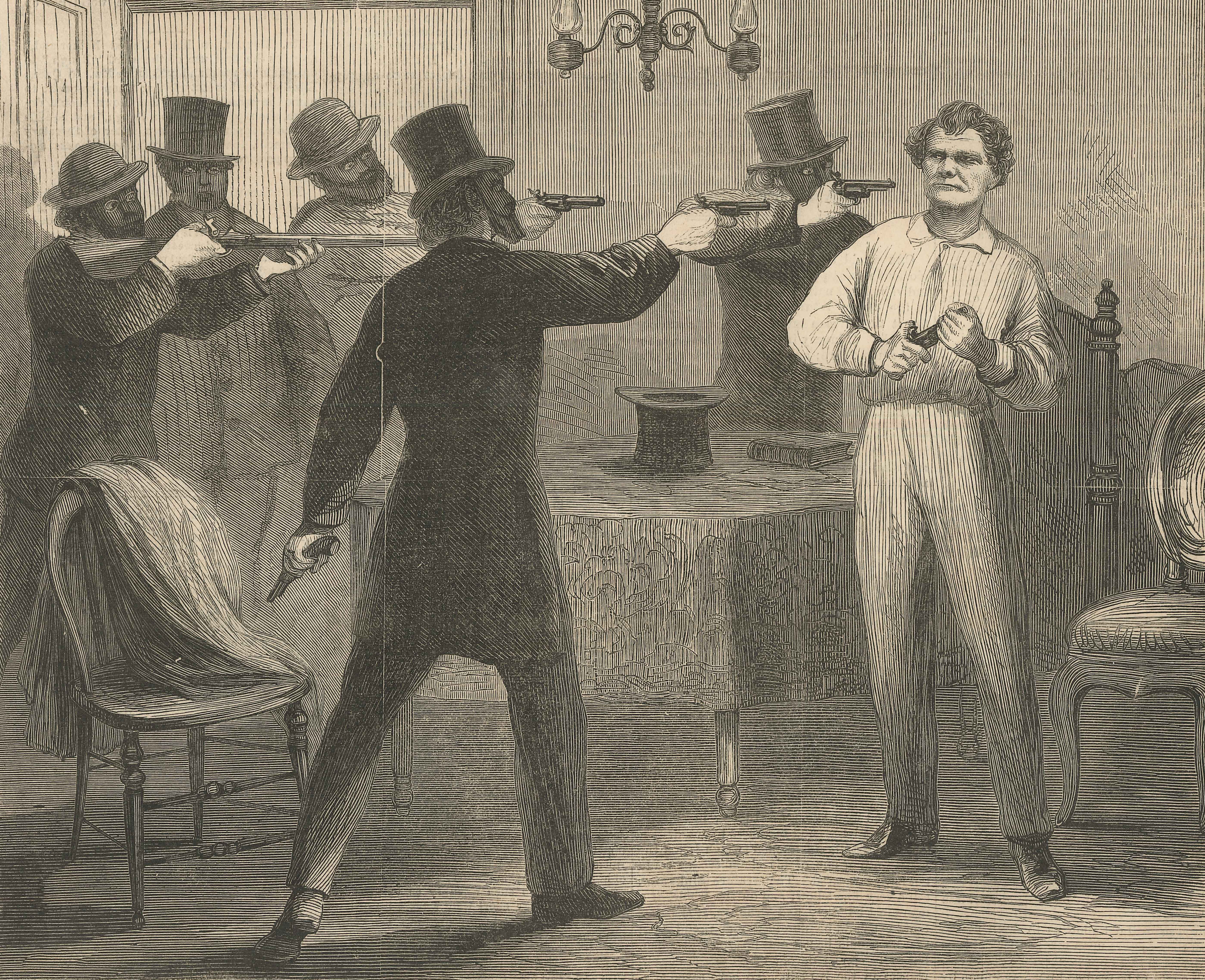
Contemporary illustration of George W. Ashburn's murder

== Ashburn murder trial ==
As president of the young men's Democratic club of Columbus, Chipley had made himself obnoxious to the carpetbaggers and scalawags, black and white, in that city and to that fact was charged in the murder of George W. Ashburn by what was later described as the "Columbus Ku Klux Klan". Ashburn, a Radical Republican member of the Georgia government, was murdered on March 31, 1868, following warnings by outspoken Democrats to cease his outspoken support for Reconstruction. In the resultant investigation into his murder, Chipley and others were identified by witness Amanda Patterson, who had been the prostitute with Ashburn, as one of several men who broke into the house Ashburn was visiting; Patterson also told investigators that Chipley had, prior to the murder, told her "We are going to kill old Ashburn the night of the day he speaks [at a political meeting]." Previously, she had testified she did not know Chipley or any other of the men whom she had said she had known.

With former Confederate Vice President Alexander H. Stephens representing the defense, Chipley and his alleged co-conspirators were tried before a military court (a civil court not being used as a result of Georgia's temporary military governorship). The prosecution, aided by federal investigator Hiram C. Whitley, assembled evidence of guilt to the point that sympathetic Southern newspapers switched from outright denial of Klan guilt to diminishing the status of the crime; as the Macon Weekly Telegraph hypothesized, perhaps the defendants had intended only to tar and feather Ashburn but when he resisted, the Klan members shot him in "quasi self-defense." Northern newspapers reported the defense as resorting to tedious details in their attempt to clear the accused, with the Chicago Tribune recording the military judges as "growing somewhat weary of the great mass of trifling and irrelevant matter introduced by the defense."

More reliable testimony—mainly from Charles Marshall, who admitted to being next to several named men (not Chipley) who murdered Ashburn, resulted in the exoneration of Chipley and other Columbus defendants. Stephens' connections with Democratic members of the Georgia House of Representatives lead to Democrats voting to ratify the Fourteenth Amendment, a Republican goal, which in turn caused the re-admittance of Georgia to the Union and the invalidation of the military court proceedings. As a result, Chipley and the others charged in Ashburn's death were released.

== Railroad executive ==
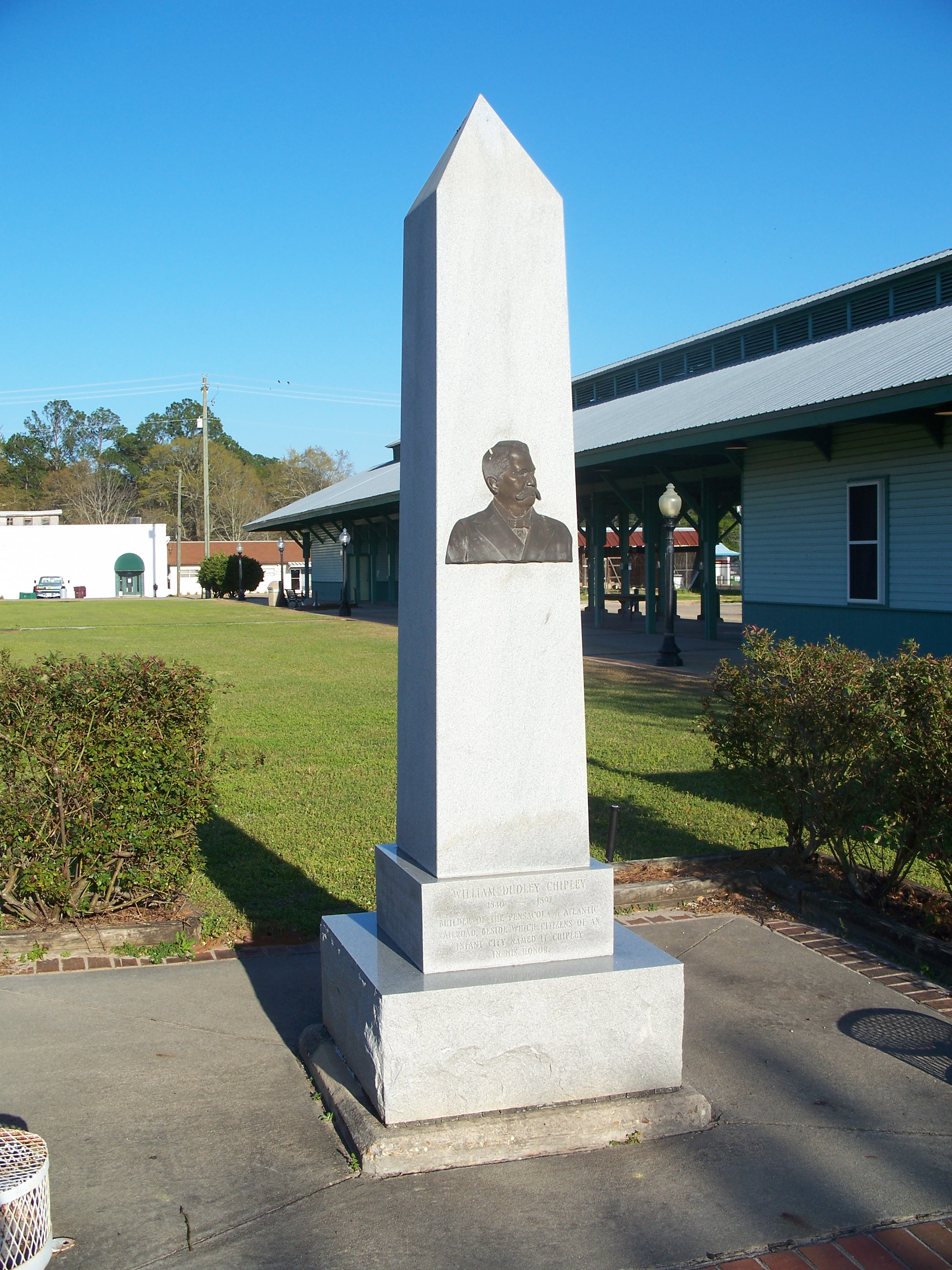
Monument in the town of Chipley, Florida

Chipley entered the railroad industry shortly after the Ashburn trial. He worked for the Columbus and Rome Railroad, and later for the Baltimore and Ohio Railroad from 1873 to 1876. In December 1876, he moved to Pensacola, Florida, where he was hired as general manager of the Pensacola Railroad, a 45-mile line linking Pensacola with the Louisville and Nashville Railroad. There had been a great deal of lawlessness where desperadoes had stopped trains. Chipley was hired to remedy matters, and he quickly succeeded. Thereafter, he departed to become superintendent of the Mobile & Montgomery Railroad. After his father died in 1880, Chipley inherited a great deal of money with which he bought the Columbus & Rome Railroad, where he originally had worked, and loaned money to others. In 1881, after selling the Columbus and Rome Railroad, Chipley invested most of his profits into promoting and building of L&N subsidiary Pensacola and Atlantic Railroad in 1881–1883, linking Pensacola and the Florida Panhandle with the eastern part of the state for the first time. Chipley was made vice-president of the P&A.

Chipley's success in getting a railroad built through the Panhandle led the residents of Orange, Florida, to rename their town Chipley in 1882. In the same year, the town of Chipley, Georgia, near Columbus, was named for him, after he got the tracks of the Columbus and Rome Railroad extended to that community; the town's name was changed to Pine Mountain in 1958.

== Politics and death ==
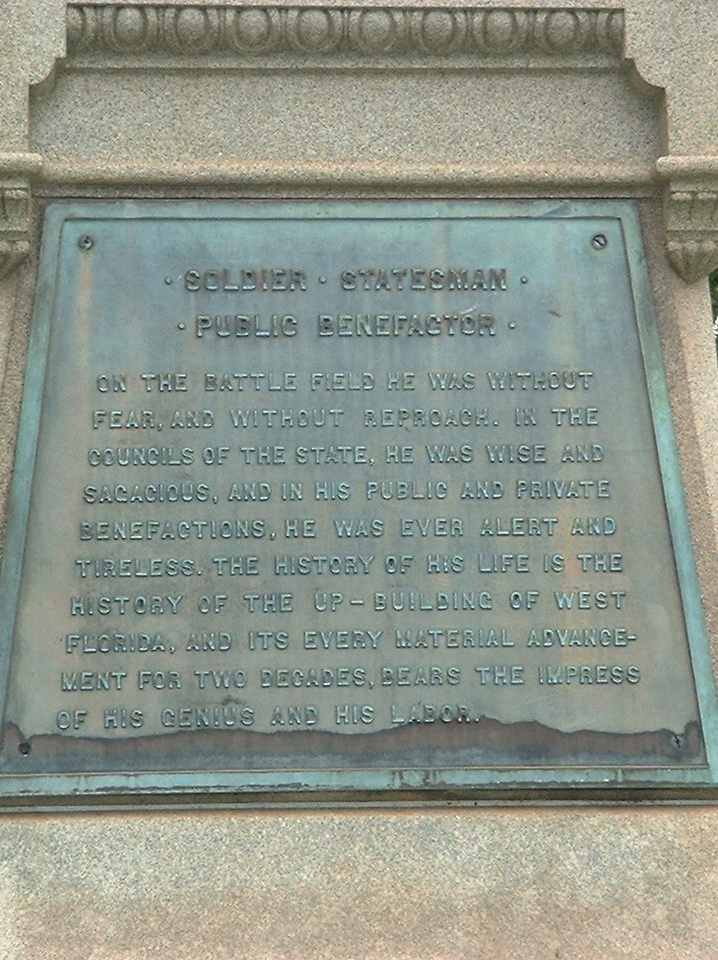
The inscription on Chipley's obelisk in Pensacola commemorates him as a "soldier", "statesman" and "public benefactor".

Chipley created the Democratic Executive Committee in Muscogee County, Georgia in the late 1860s, and was its first director. He later served as director of the Florida Democratic Executive Committee.

Chipley served one term as the mayor of Pensacola (1887–1888). He also served in the Florida State Senate from 1895 to 1897, and lost his bid for United States Senator in 1896 by one vote.

While on a trip to Washington, D.C., Chipley died on December 1, 1897. He was in the middle of traveling to lobby lawmakers to base more industrial endeavors in Florida. He was buried in Columbus, while the townspeople of Pensacola erected an obelisk in the Plaza Ferdinand VII in his honor.

== See also ==
- List of mayors of Pensacola, Florida
