= Bertha Isaacs =

Bahamian teacher, tennis player, activist and politician (1900–1997)

- Image from a stamp in 2012
- Born: Albertha Magdelina Hanna; 18 April 1900; Saint Matthew Parish, New Providence, Bahamas
- Died: 1 August 1997 (aged 97); Nassau, Bahamas
- Other name: Albertha Isaacs
- Occupations: Educator, tennis player, women's rights activist, politician

Dame Albertha Magdelina Isaacs DBE (née Hanna; 18 April 1900 – 1 August 1997) was a Bahamian teacher, tennis player, women's rights activist and politician. After a career as an elementary school teacher, she played on the international tennis circuit, winning both singles and doubles titles in the 1930s.

Returning to the Bahamas, she became involved in the women's suffrage movement in the country, helping gain the vote in 1962. She was the second woman to be appointed as a Senator in the Bahamas and the first woman to be awarded the honorary title of Dame Commander of the Order of the British Empire. An annual trophy awarded at the Commonwealth Caribbean Lawn Tennis Championship bears her name.

== Early life ==
Albertha Magdelina Hanna was born on 18 April 1900 in Saint Matthews Parish on New Providence in the Bahamas to Lilla Celeste (née Minns) and Robert Samuel Hanna. She attended Girls Cosmopolitan School and later the Victoria Schools of Nassau.

== Career ==
After completing her education, Hanna began working as a grammar school teacher. On 20 February 1922, in Nassau, Hanna married Edward Adolphus Isaacs Jr., who was known as Ned. After around a decade, she left education and pursued a career as a professional tennis player.

She was a co-founder of the Gym Tennis Club of Nassau. Throughout the 1930s, Isaacs competed in international tennis events. By 1934, she was ranked #13 on the U.S. tennis tour and was the title holder in Florida, Georgia and Nassau. She played both singles and doubles, winning the singles match in 1934 and doubles in 1937 along with E. Lilyan Spencer, at the Southern Open Championship held at Tuskegee Institute.

When the Progressive Liberal Party (PLP) was founded in 1953, Isaacs was one of the founding members of the Women's Branch of the PLP. Because women's roles were limited to fundraising, she turned her attention to the suffrage movement and focused on gaining the right to vote. Socio-economic barriers to women created disadvantages in education, employment, family support, inheritance and political activism. Isaacs and other feminists worked within women's organizations both locally and internationally to lobby for the right to vote. In the late 1950s the PLP platform included women's suffrage, as they were in favor of majority rule government.

In 1958, Isaacs was one of the women who founded and served on the executive committee of the National Council of Women. By 1960, the suffrage movement had gained ground with the United Bahamian Party as well and in 1962, Bahamian women won the right to vote.

In 1969, Isaacs was appointed as a Senator for the PLP, second woman Senator of the Bahamas, after Doris Sands Johnson who had been appointed in 1967.

In the 1970s, Isaacs served on the board of the Licensing Authority.

== Awards and honours ==
In 1974, Isaacs was granted the honorary title of Dame Commander of the Order of the British Empire. The award marked the first time the honour had been given to a Bahamian woman. The following year, Isaacs was honoured by the Bahamas Lawn Tennis Association when they created an annual award bearing her name. The Dame Bertha Isaacs trophy is awarded at the Commonwealth Caribbean Lawn Tennis Championship to the female player who has demonstrated the highest standard of court behavior, quality of play and sportsmanship.

== Death and legacy ==
Isaacs died in August 1997 in Nassau, Bahamas. In 2012, to commemorate the 50th anniversary of women gaining the vote in the Bahamas, a series of stamps was issued featuring prominent women's rights activists. Isaacs's likeness appears on the 70 cent stamp.

Her great-grandson is former Bahamian Major League Baseball player and current New York Mets First Base Coach Antoan Richardson. In his previous coaching stop with the San Francisco Giants he wore the number 00, representing her birth year to honor her legacy. She was also the sister-in-law of Bahamian lawyer and politician Sir Kendal Isaacs. Her grandson is Justice Jon Isaacs, the current President of the Supreme Court of The Bahamas.
