= Falling Waters State Park =

State park in Florida, United States

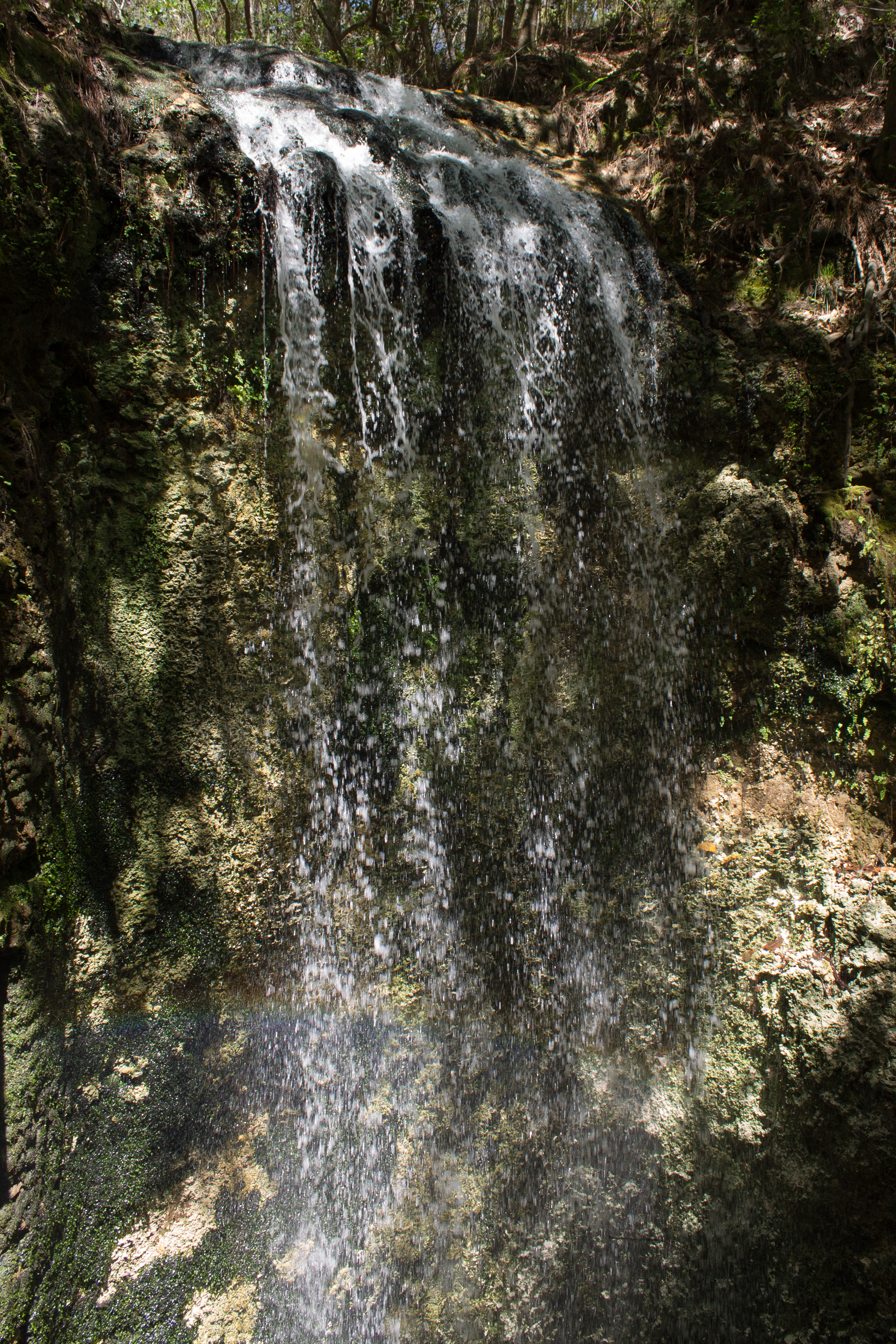
- Falling Waters

- Location within Florida Location within the United States
- Interactive map of Falling Waters State Park
- Location: Washington County, Florida, United States
- Nearest city: Chipley, Florida
- Coordinates: 30°43′41″N 85°31′43″W
- Area: 171 acres (69 ha)
- Elevation: 239 ft (73 m)
- Established: 1962
- Named for: Falling Water Falls
- Visitors: 30000 (in in 2008)
- Governing body: Florida Division of Recreation and Parks
- Website: Falling Waters State Park

Falling Waters State Park is a 171-acre (69 ha) Florida state park located in unincorporated Washington County, in northwestern Florida, 3 miles (4.8 km) south of Chipley. The park contains a 73-foot (22 m) waterfall, the highest in the state known as "Falling Waters Falls”.

== History ==
The sinkholes at Falling Waters State Park were used as a hideout by Indian warriors fighting against Andrew Jackson during the Seminole Wars. The park is the site of a Civil War era gristmill. The gristmill was powered by the waterfall in Falling Waters Sink. Later, in 1891, a distillery was constructed on the site. The park is also the site of the first oil well in Florida. It was drilled in 1919 based on information from local legends and a 400-year-old Spanish diary. The well, which reached a depth of 4,912 feet (1,497 m) never proved to hold a commercially viable amount of oil and was capped in 1921.

The park was deeded to the state in 1962 by the Washington County Development authority. Park facilities such as a picnic pavilion and restrooms were constructed soon after. An archaeologic dig, led by the University of West Florida in 2007, revealed Indian artifacts that were between 1,000 and 1,500 years old. Items found included bits of pottery, Indian arrowheads and what may be the only cave painting in Florida. The archaeologists noted that they thought the same thing that attracts visitors to the park today, the waterfall, also attracted Native Americans to the site. Remnants of the gristmill, distillery and oil well were also found by the team from the university.

== Geology ==
Extended systems of underwater caves, sinkholes and springs are found throughout Florida. The limestone is topped with sandy soils deposited as ancient beaches over millions of years as global sea levels rose and fell. During the last glacial period, lower sea levels and a drier climate revealed a much wider peninsula, largely savanna.

Falling Waters State Park lies atop a bed of limestone that has been eroded over the years by water which has created the sinkholes and caverns that are found throughout the park. The waterfalls of Falling Waters State Park fall into a 100-foot (30 m) sinkhole known as Falling Waters Sink. The waterfalls are fed by springs that are dependent on rainfall. The water from the falls disappears into a large cavern at the base of the sinkhole. The sinkhole can be accessed by visitors by way of a paved trail and boardwalk.

== Recreation ==
Falling Water State Park is open for year-round recreation including camping, fishing, hiking and swimming. The park is noted for hosting campfire circles. Park rangers give interpretive talks at the circles and present a slide show. The main campground is on one of the highest hills in Florida at 324 feet (99 m). It has twenty-four sites that are equipped with electricity, fresh water, picnic tables and grills and a clothesline. Swimming and fishing are permitted in the 2 acres (0.81 ha) lake.

== Gallery ==
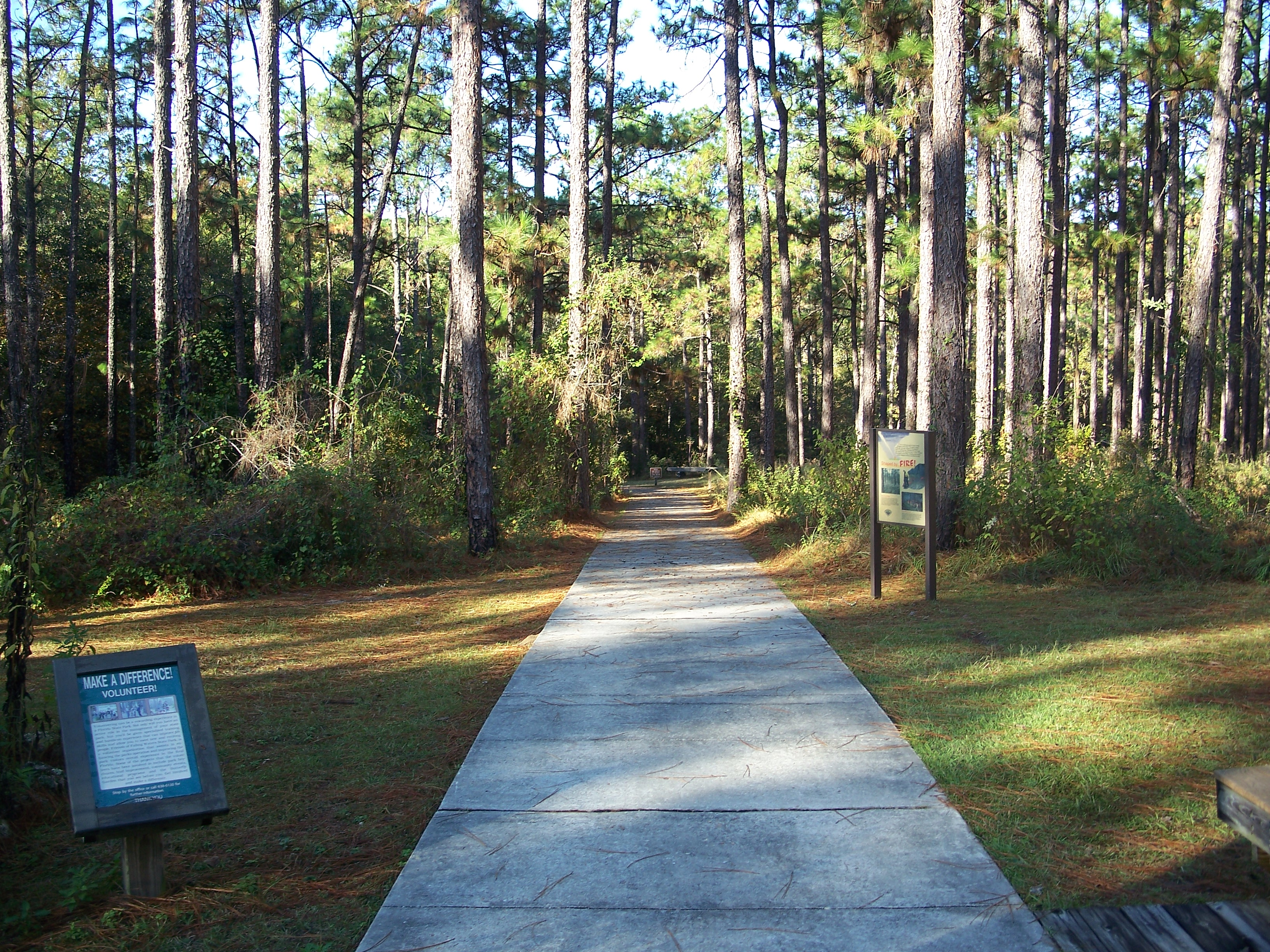
View from the Trail

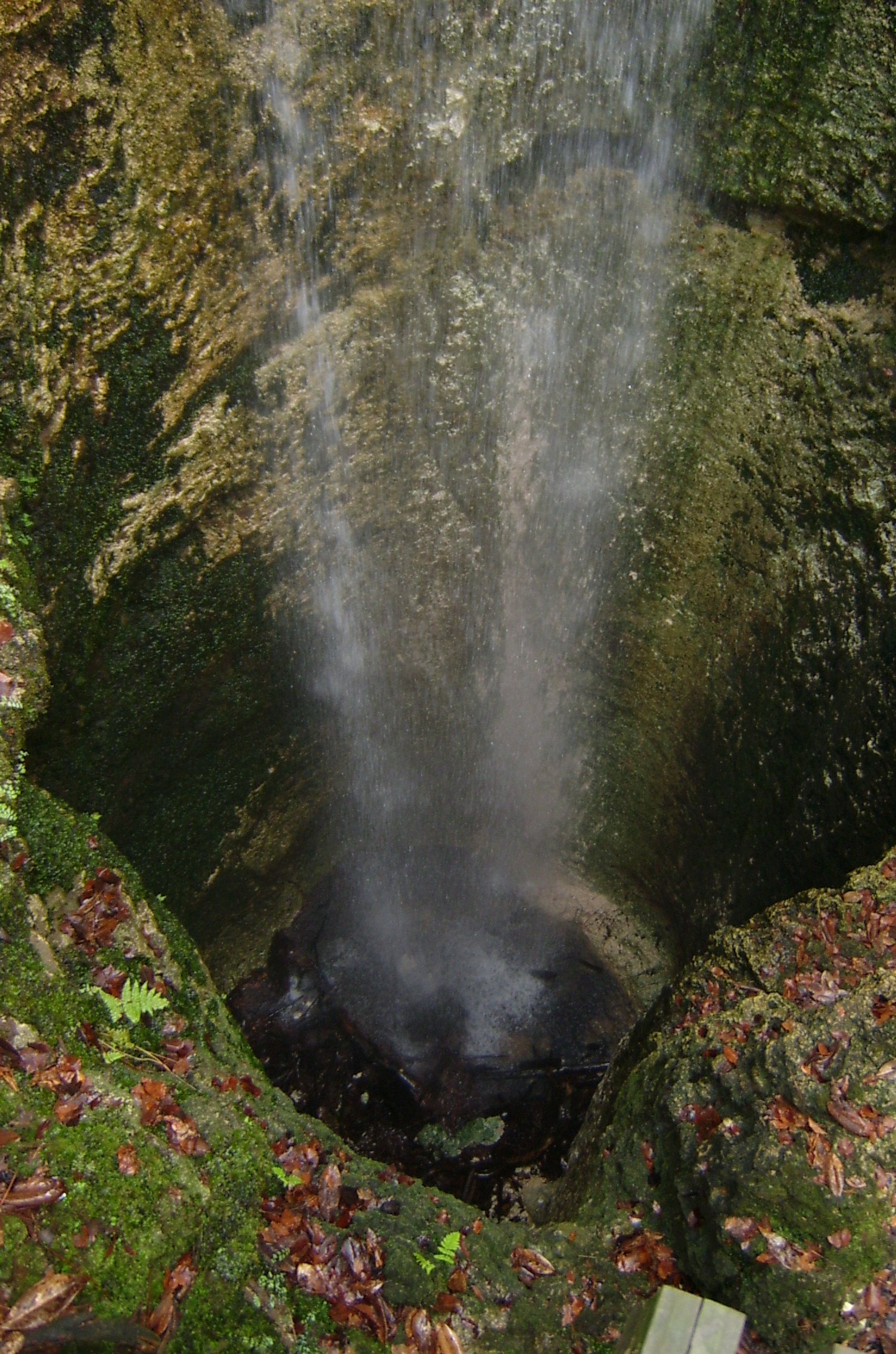
View down into the sink

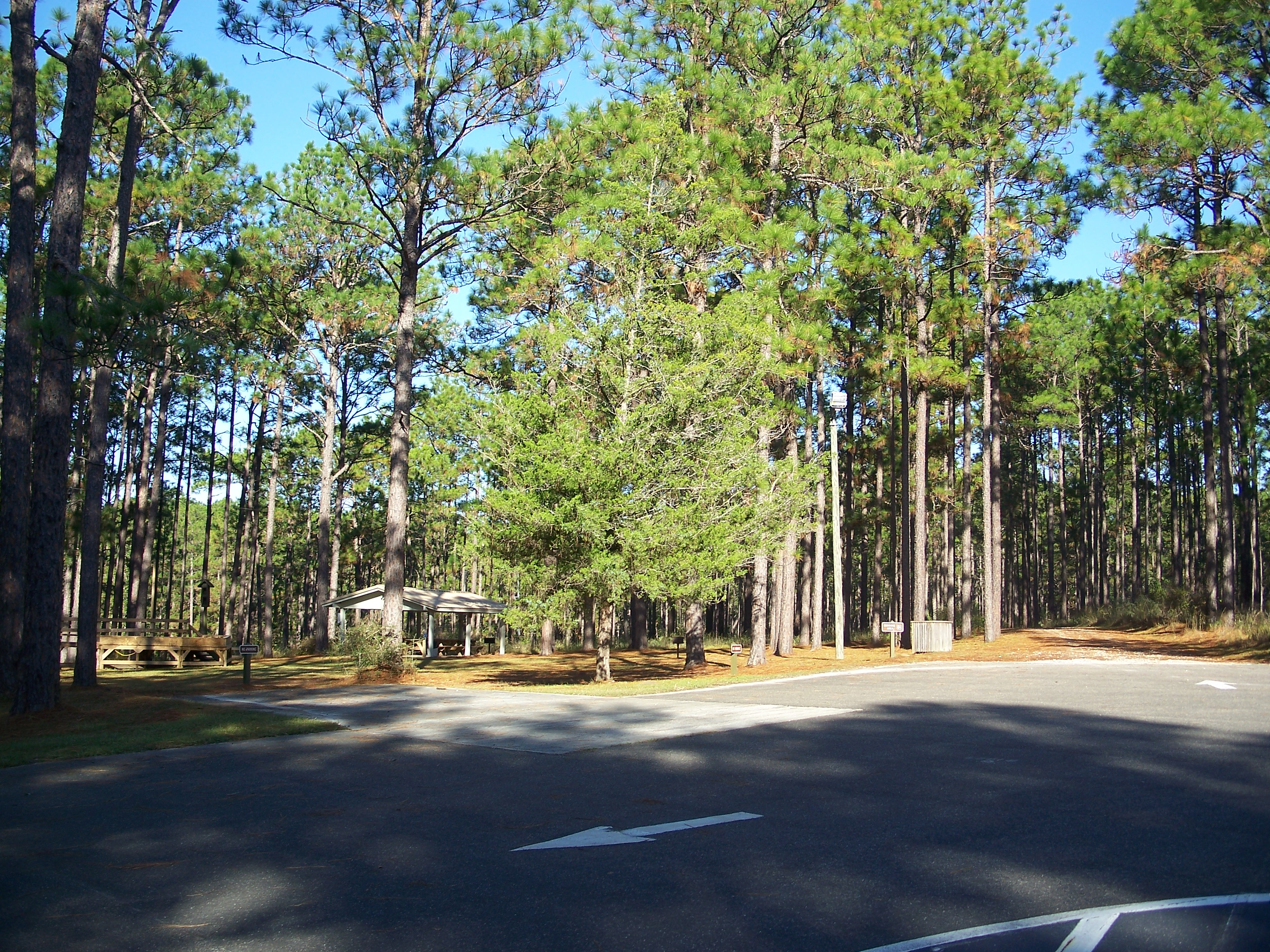
View of Parking lot

== See also ==
- List of waterfalls
