= Chaires Community Historic District =

Historic district in Florida, United States

- U.S. National Register of Historic Places
- U.S. Historic district
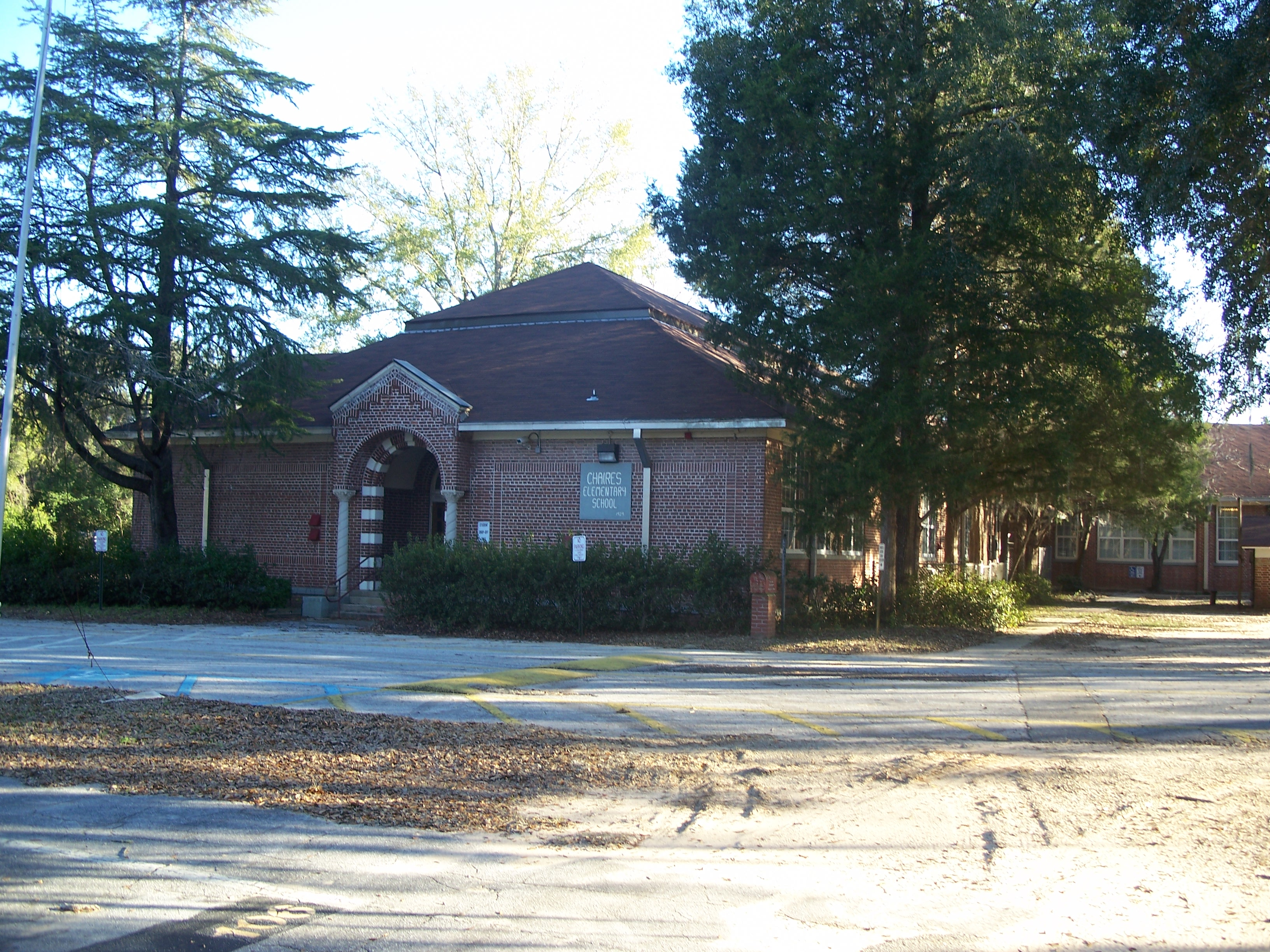
- Chaires Elementary School

- Location within Florida Location within the United States
- Location: Chaires, Florida
- Coordinates: 30°26′12″N 84°7′9″W
- Area: 30 acres (120,000 m^{2})
- Architect: Alvin R. Moore (school)
- Architectural style: Romanesque Revival, Vernacular
- NRHP reference No.: 00001502
- Added to NRHP: 13 December 2000

The Chaires Community Historic District is a U.S. historic district (designated as such on December 13, 2000) located in Chaires, Florida. The district runs roughly along Chaires Cross Road, Road to the Lake, and Hancock Street (now Parkhill Road). It contains 15 historic buildings.

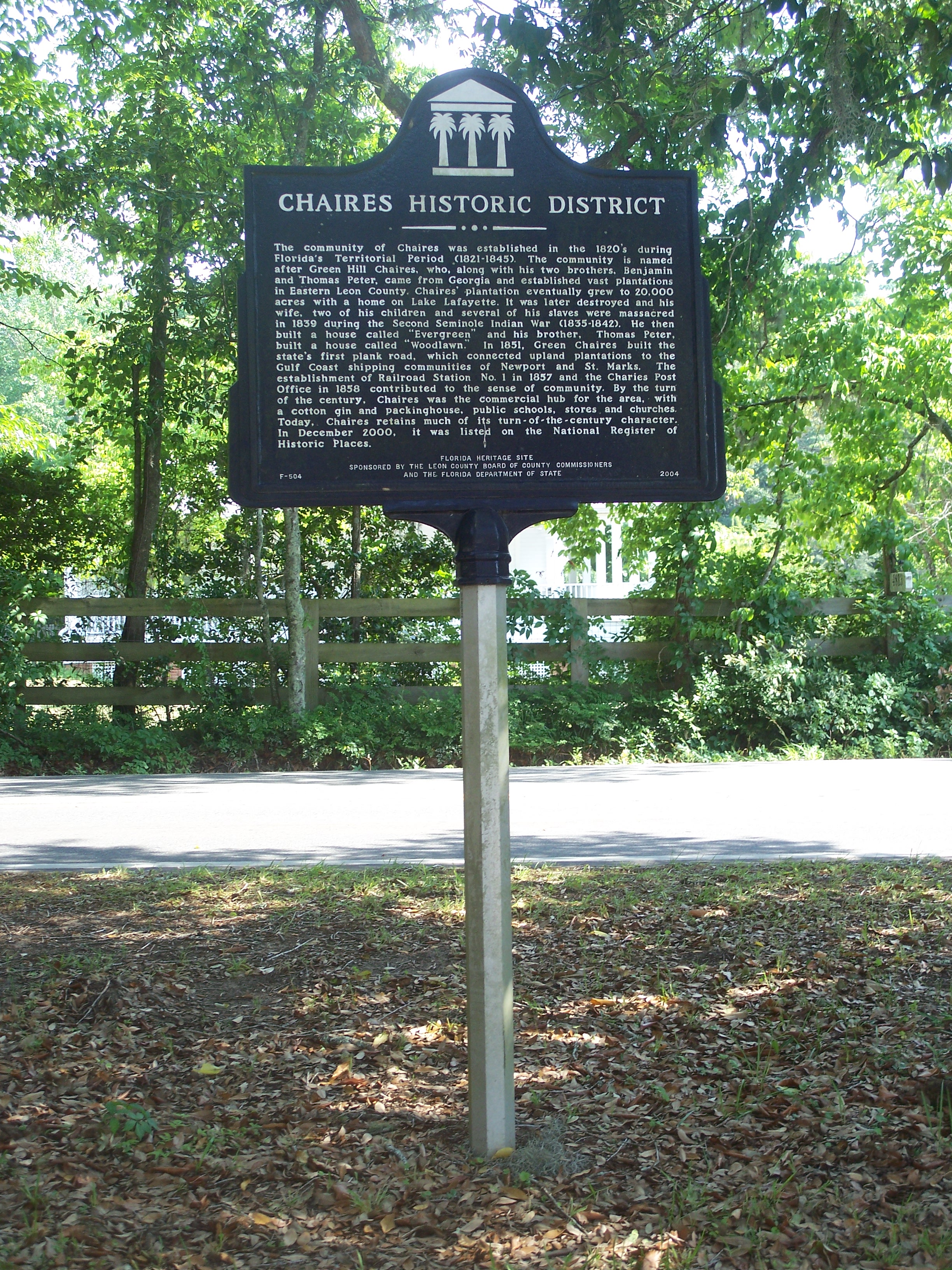

With the exception of a brick Romanesque Revival Chaires Elementary School, the buildings in the district are of wooden vernacular construction. The school, built in 1929, was designed by Tallahassee architect Alvin R. Moore. Moore was also the architect of the Chipley City Hall, built in 1928.
