= Chipley High School =

Location
- 1545 Brickyard Road; Chipley, Florida 32428; United States; 30.7630°N 85.5570°W

Information
- Type: Public
- School district: Washington County School District
- NCES School ID: 120201002027
- Principal: Steve Griffin
- Teaching staff: 30.00 (on FTE basis)
- Grades: 9 to 12
- Enrollment: 555 (2023-2024)
- Student to teacher ratio: 18.50
- Colors: Blue and Gold
- Mascot: Tigers
- Website: chs.wcsdschools.com

Chipley High School is a public high school located at 1545 Brickyard Road in Chipley, Florida. Previously, the school was located on 2nd Street until 2000, when the present school was built on Brickyard Road. Spanish Trail Playhouse is located there today. The school's teams compete as the Tigers. Chipley High School dress code restrictions are addressed in the student handbook and there is no required school uniform. The school currently has a "B" grade as of 2025 according to the Florida Department of Education School Accountability report. It is part of the Washington County School District in Washington County, Florida.

== Athletics ==
Athletics at Chipley High School include football, boys’ and girls’ basketball, baseball, volleyball, golf, girls weightlifting, softball, cross country, and track. Chipley Boys Basketball won State Championships in 2016, 2015, and 2012. State Runner Up 1989 and 2023. Chipley Football was state runner-up in 2011. Chipley Baseball won State Championship in 2023. State Runner Up 2014 and 2021.

== Notable people ==
- NBA hall of famer Artis Gilmore transferred from Roulhac High School to Chipley for one week before moving to George Washington Carver High School in Dothan, Alabama
- Alex Hamilton (born 1993), basketball player for Hapoel Eilat in the Israeli Basketball Premier League
- Amp Lee, RB Florida State, professional football player, 1997 Team MVP for the Rams.
- Trent Forrest, professional basketball player, point guard Florida State
- Karsten Whitson, professional baseball player, drafted ninth overall in the 2010 MLB draft by the San Diego Padres
