= Woman's Club of Chipley =

- U.S. National Register of Historic Places
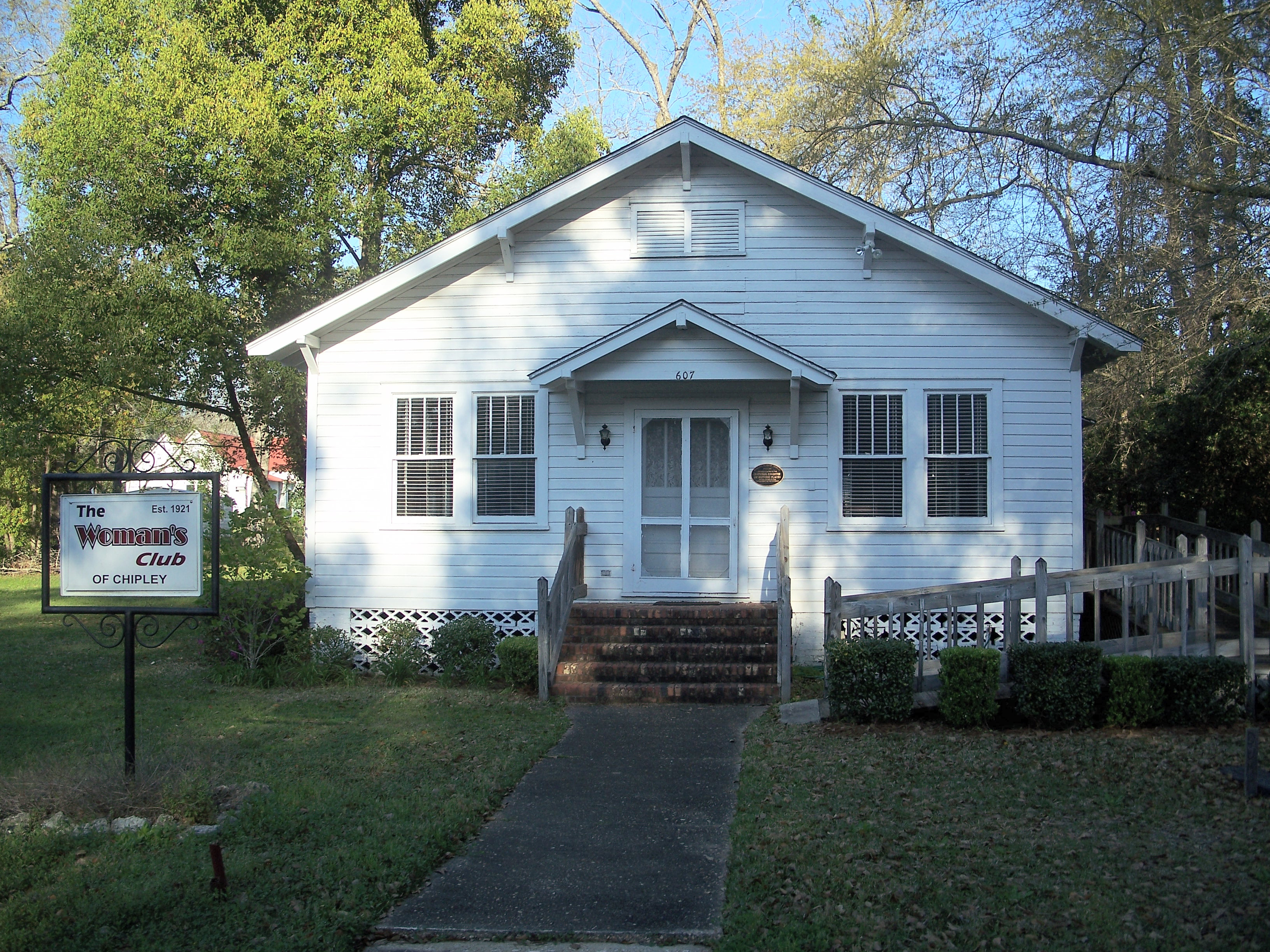

- Location within Florida Location within the United States
- Location: Chipley, Florida
- Coordinates: 30°47′7″N 85°32′24″W
- Built: 1931
- Built by: Thomas Langston
- Architectural style: Craftsman
- MPS: Clubhouses of Florida's Woman's Clubs MPS
- NRHP reference No.: 97001514
- Added to NRHP: December 8, 1997

The Woman's Club of Chipley is a historic woman's club in Chipley, Florida, located at 607 Fifth Street. It is on the same block as the historic Chipley City Hall. It was built in 1931 in the Craftsman style by Thomas Langston. On December 8, 1997, it was added to the U.S. National Register of Historic Places.

== See also ==
- List of Registered Historic Woman's Clubhouses in Florida
