= Washington County Chamber of Commerce =

- Chipley City Hall
- U.S. National Register of Historic Places
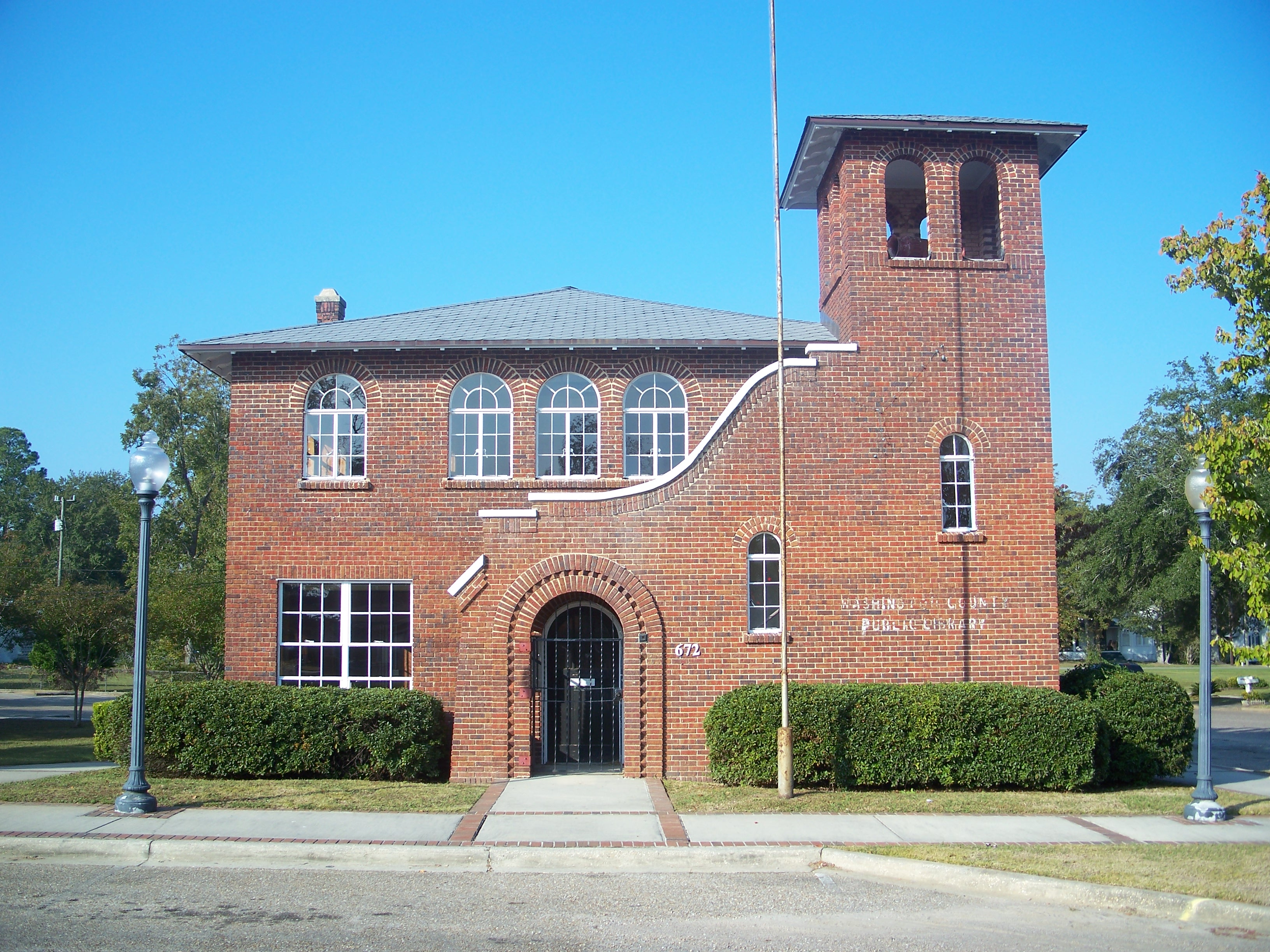

- Location within Florida Location within the United States
- Location: Chipley, Florida
- Coordinates: 30°46′53″N 85°32′25″W
- Built: 1928
- Built by: J. R. Buchanan
- Architect: Alvin R. Moore
- Architectural style: Mission Revival
- NRHP reference No.: 05000216
- Added to NRHP: March 30, 2005

The Washington County Chamber of Commerce is located in the former Chipley City Hall building, which has also been used as Washington County Public Library. It is a historic site in Chipley, Florida at 672 Fifth Street. It is on the same block as the historic Woman's Club of Chipley. On March 30, 2005, it was added to the U.S. National Register of Historic Places.

According to City Council member Cheryl Gainer McCall, the City Council approved building a City Hall in 1928 for $8,000. J.R. and Lee H. Buchanan were contracted to build it with local brick from Hall's Brickyard and a red brick facade from Interlocking Tiling Company in Jacksonville, Florida. It was designed by Alvin R. Moore of Tallahassee and completed in 1929. Renovations were carried out in 2004. In 2007, the interior was renovated and modernised for the building to be used as the Washington County Chamber of Commerce.

Architect Moore also designed the 1929 Chaires School, in Leon County.
