= William Stout Chipley =

William Stout Chipley (October 16, 1810 – February 11, 1880) was an early American psychologist.

Chipley was born in Lexington, Kentucky, October 18, 1810, the only son of the Reverend Stephen Chipley, a pioneer of Lexington. William Chipley graduated from the Transylvania University in 1832. He was later renowned for his work relating to brain diseases and held two jobs: a professor of medicine at Transylvania University and the warden of the Eastern Asylum for the Insane in Lexington. He married Georgia Elizabeth Fannin in 1837 while he lived in Columbus, Georgia. By this marriage he had four sons and one daughter.

When he took charge of the Eastern Kentucky Insane Asylum in 1855, he found that institution overcrowded with incurables, epileptics, and feeble minded, huddled together without any attempt at classification and separation. These defects were not only remedied by Chipley, but largely through his efforts other institutions in Kentucky were erected.

William Stout Chipley published a paper on "sitomania," a type of insanity consisting of an intense dread or loathing of food. Clinical research in Great Britain and France during the 1860s and 1870s replaced sitomania with the term "anorexia nervosa" and distinguished the disorder from other mental illnesses in which appetite loss was a secondary symptom and from physical "wasting" diseases, such as tuberculosis, diabetes, and cancer.
