= Chipley, Florida =

- City
- City of Chipley
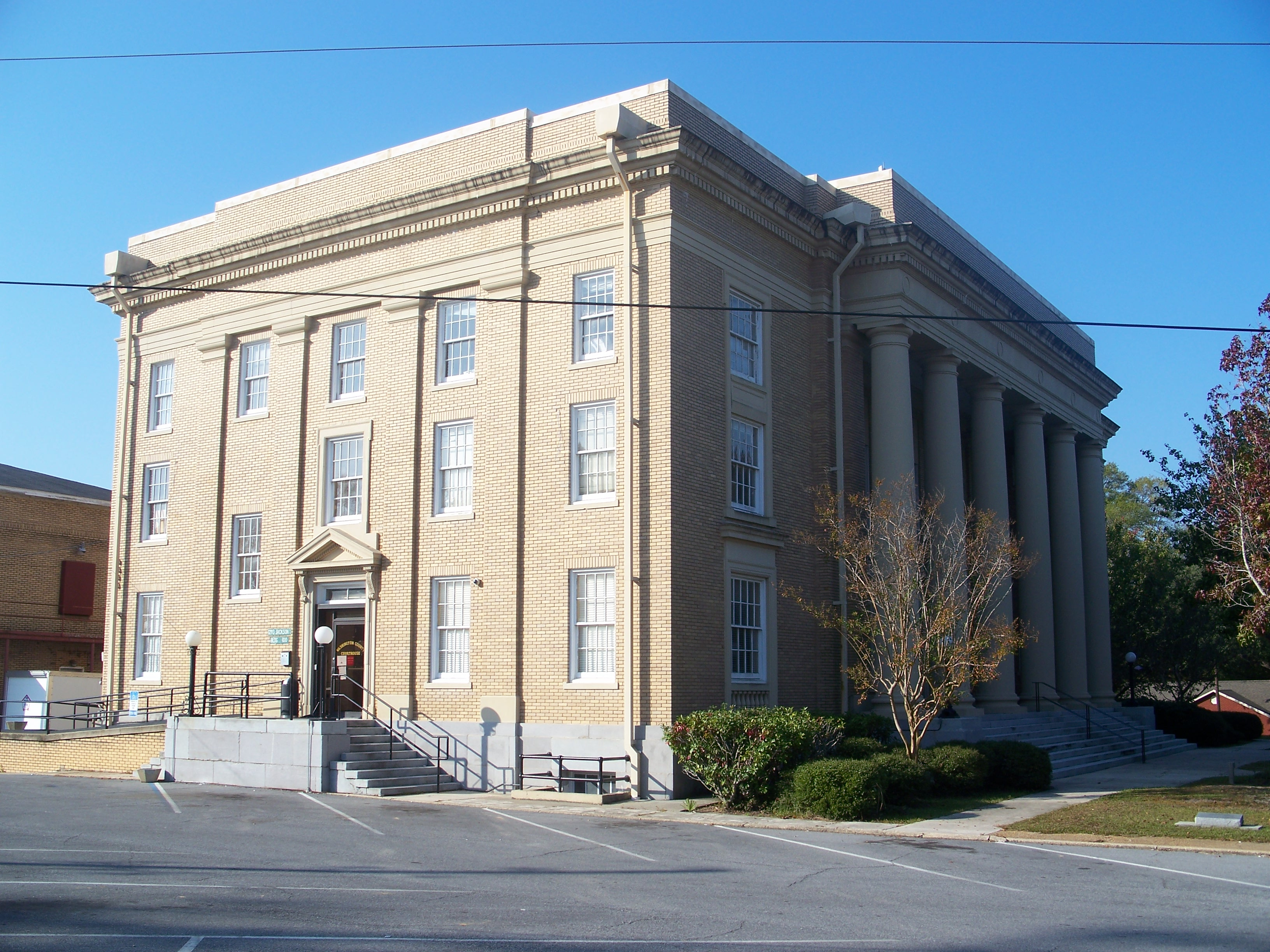
- Washington County Courthouse

- Seal
- Motto(s): "Proud Heritage, Bright Future"
- Location in Washington County and the state of Florida
- Coordinates: 30°45′40″N 85°32′38″W
- Country: United States
- State: Florida
- County: Washington
- Settled (Orange): 1882
- Incorporated (City of Chipley): 1901

Government
  - Type: Council-manager
  - Mayor: Tracy Andrews
  - Mayor Pro Tem: Kevin Russell
  - City Council: Leonard Blount, Cheryl McCall, and Linda Cain
  - City Administrator: Patrice A. Tanner
  - City Clerk: Sherry Snell

Area
  - Total: 4.24 sq mi (10.99 km^{2})
  - Land: 4.24 sq mi (10.99 km^{2})
  - Water: 0 sq mi (0.00 km^{2})
- Elevation: 98 ft (30 m)

Population (2020)
  - Total: 3,660
  - Density: 862.3/sq mi (332.92/km^{2})
- Time zone: UTC-5 (CST)
  - Summer (DST): UTC-4 (CDT)
- ZIP code: 32428
- Area code(s): 850, 448
- FIPS code: 12-11975
- GNIS feature ID: 2404049
- Website: cityofchipley.com

Chipley is a city in and the county seat of Washington County, Florida, United States, located between Tallahassee and Pensacola. Its population was 3,660 in the 2020 census, up from 3,605 at the 2010 census. It is part of the Panama City, Florida metropolitan area. The area is served by Chipley High School.

== History ==
The community was originally called "Orange" when it was settled in 1882, but it was later renamed "Chipley", after William Dudley Chipley, who was president of the Pensacola and Atlantic Railroad and a Florida state senator from 1895 to 1897.

The City of Chipley was officially incorporated as a municipality in 1901.

During the cold snap of January 1985, a temperature of 2 °F (−17 °C) was recorded at one of the city's golf courses, making it the second-coldest Florida temperature ever recorded and the lowest January reading for the state.

== Geography ==
The city is located in the Florida Panhandle along Interstate 10 and U.S. Route 90. U.S. Route 90 runs through the downtown area from west to east as Jackson Avenue, and leads east 10 mi (16 km) to Cottondale and west 9 mi (14 km) to Bonifay. Interstate 10 runs from west to east south of the city, with access from exit 120 (Florida State Road 77). I-10 leads east 86 mi (138 km) to Tallahassee, the state capital, and west 116 mi (187 km) to Pensacola. FL-77 is the main north–south route through the city, and leads north 12 mi (19 km) to Graceville and south 47 mi (76 km) to Panama City.

According to the United States Census Bureau, the city has an area of 4.1 square miles (11 km^{2}), all land.

=== Climate ===
The City of Chipley is part of the humid subtropical climate zone with a Köppen Climate Classification of "Cfa" (C = mild temperate, f = fully humid, and a = hot summer).

Climate data for Chipley, Florida, 1991–2020 normals, extremes 1939–present
| Month | Jan | Feb | Mar | Apr | May | Jun | Jul | Aug | Sep | Oct | Nov | Dec | Year |
|---|---|---|---|---|---|---|---|---|---|---|---|---|---|
| Record high °F (°C) | 86 (30) | 89 (32) | 92 (33) | 97 (36) | 100 (38) | 104 (40) | 104 (40) | 102 (39) | 102 (39) | 99 (37) | 90 (32) | 90 (32) | 104 (40) |
| Mean maximum °F (°C) | 77.2 (25.1) | 79.9 (26.6) | 84.6 (29.2) | 88.8 (31.6) | 94.0 (34.4) | 96.9 (36.1) | 97.7 (36.5) | 97.4 (36.3) | 95.5 (35.3) | 90.0 (32.2) | 83.7 (28.7) | 79.0 (26.1) | 98.6 (37.0) |
| Mean daily maximum °F (°C) | 63.6 (17.6) | 67.4 (19.7) | 74.0 (23.3) | 80.3 (26.8) | 87.6 (30.9) | 91.6 (33.1) | 93.0 (33.9) | 92.4 (33.6) | 89.3 (31.8) | 82.0 (27.8) | 72.3 (22.4) | 65.7 (18.7) | 79.9 (26.6) |
| Daily mean °F (°C) | 51.1 (10.6) | 54.4 (12.4) | 60.7 (15.9) | 66.8 (19.3) | 74.8 (23.8) | 80.6 (27.0) | 82.6 (28.1) | 82.2 (27.9) | 78.2 (25.7) | 69.0 (20.6) | 59.1 (15.1) | 53.3 (11.8) | 67.7 (19.8) |
| Mean daily minimum °F (°C) | 38.6 (3.7) | 41.4 (5.2) | 47.3 (8.5) | 53.3 (11.8) | 62.1 (16.7) | 69.6 (20.9) | 72.2 (22.3) | 71.9 (22.2) | 67.1 (19.5) | 56.1 (13.4) | 45.8 (7.7) | 41.0 (5.0) | 55.5 (13.1) |
| Mean minimum °F (°C) | 23.2 (−4.9) | 25.9 (−3.4) | 31.3 (−0.4) | 39.3 (4.1) | 48.8 (9.3) | 62.0 (16.7) | 67.1 (19.5) | 65.1 (18.4) | 55.2 (12.9) | 40.2 (4.6) | 30.4 (−0.9) | 26.1 (−3.3) | 20.9 (−6.2) |
| Record low °F (°C) | 2 (−17) | 10 (−12) | 20 (−7) | 31 (−1) | 39 (4) | 47 (8) | 55 (13) | 55 (13) | 36 (2) | 27 (−3) | 17 (−8) | 8 (−13) | 2 (−17) |
| Average precipitation inches (mm) | 5.09 (129) | 5.53 (140) | 5.65 (144) | 4.86 (123) | 4.09 (104) | 5.29 (134) | 7.16 (182) | 6.17 (157) | 4.22 (107) | 3.66 (93) | 4.25 (108) | 4.79 (122) | 60.76 (1,543) |
| Average precipitation days (≥ 0.01 in) | 9.8 | 9.2 | 8.5 | 7.2 | 7.5 | 12.3 | 15.3 | 14.0 | 9.7 | 6.8 | 7.4 | 9.4 | 117.1 |
Source: NOAA

== Demographics ==
Historical population
| Census | Pop. | Note | %± |
|---|---|---|---|
| 1890 | 354 | | — |
| 1900 | 652 | | 84.2% |
| 1910 | 1,099 | | 68.6% |
| 1920 | 1,806 | | 64.3% |
| 1930 | 1,878 | | 4.0% |
| 1940 | 2,167 | | 15.4% |
| 1950 | 2,959 | | 36.5% |
| 1960 | 3,159 | | 6.8% |
| 1970 | 3,347 | | 6.0% |
| 1980 | 3,330 | | −0.5% |
| 1990 | 3,866 | | 16.1% |
| 2000 | 3,592 | | −7.1% |
| 2010 | 3,605 | | 0.4% |
| 2020 | 3,660 | | 1.5% |
U.S. Decennial Census

=== Racial and ethnic composition ===
Chipley racial composition (Hispanics excluded from racial categories) (NH = Non-Hispanic)
| Race | Pop 2010 | Pop 2020 | % 2010 | % 2020 |
|---|---|---|---|---|
| White (NH) | 2,398 | 2,255 | 66.52% | 61.61% |
| Black or African American (NH) | 951 | 927 | 26.38% | 25.33% |
| Native American or Alaska Native (NH) | 29 | 23 | 0.80% | 0.63% |
| Asian (NH) | 41 | 38 | 1.14% | 1.04% |
| Pacific Islander or Native Hawaiian (NH) | 3 | 11 | 0.08% | 0.30% |
| Some other race (NH) | 2 | 14 | 0.06% | 0.38% |
| Two or more races/Multiracial (NH) | 75 | 244 | 2.08% | 6.67% |
| Hispanic or Latino (any race) | 106 | 148 | 2.94% | 4.04% |
| Total | 3,605 | 3,660 | 100.00% | 100.00% |

=== 2020 census ===
As of the 2020 census, Chipley had a population of 3,660. The median age was 37.7 years. 25.4% of residents were under the age of 18 and 19.9% of residents were 65 years of age or older. For every 100 females there were 86.1 males, and for every 100 females age 18 and over there were 80.5 males age 18 and over.

As of 2020, 0.0% of residents lived in urban areas, while 100.0% lived in rural areas.

In 2020, there were 1,324 households in Chipley, of which 34.4% had children under the age of 18 living in them. Of all households, 33.3% were married-couple households, 18.7% were households with a male householder and no spouse or partner present, and 41.1% were households with a female householder and no spouse or partner present. About 33.5% of all households were made up of individuals and 15.1% had someone living alone who was 65 years of age or older.

In 2020, there were 1,583 housing units, of which 16.4% were vacant. The homeowner vacancy rate was 2.6% and the rental vacancy rate was 9.3%.

In the 2020 American Community Survey 5-year estimates, there were 766 families residing in the city.

=== 2010 census ===
As of the 2010 United States census, there were 3,605 people, 1,256 households, and 692 families residing in the city.

=== 2000 census ===
As of the census of 2000, there are 3,592 people, 1,442 households, and 908 families residing in the city. The population density was 872.5 inhabitants per square mile (336.9 inhabitants/km^{2}). There were 1,694 housing units at an average density of 411.5 per square mile (158.9/km^{2}). The racial makeup of the city is 67.85% White, 28.51% African American, 1.28% Native American, 0.56% Asian, 0.03% Pacific Islander, 0.22% from other races, and 1.56% from two or more races. 1.45% of the population are Hispanic or Latino of any race.

In 2000, there are 1,442 households out of which 28.4% have children under the age of 18 living with them, 40.2% are married couples living together, 19.3% have a female householder with no husband present, and 37.0% are non-families. 33.2% of all households are made up of individuals and 18.0% have someone living alone who is 65 years of age or older. The average household size is 2.33 and the average family size is 2.97.

In 2000, in the city, the age distribution is 25.1% under the age of 18, 7.2% from 18 to 24, 24.5% from 25 to 44, 21.4% from 45 to 64, and 21.7% who are 65 years of age or older. The median age is 39 years. For every 100 females there are 82.9 males. For every 100 females age 18 and over, there are 77.4 males.

In 2000, the median income for a household in the city was $21,686, and the median income for a family was $28,792. Males had a median income of $23,715 versus $19,662 for females. The per capita income for the city was $12,842. About 25.1% of families and 27.7% of the population were below the poverty line, including 42.4% of those under age 18 and 22.3% of those age 65 or over.

== Points of interest ==
- Washington County Courthouse
- Chipley City Hall
- South Third Street Historic District
- Woman's Club of Chipley

Northwest Florida Reception Center, which has a Chipley post office address, is in an unincorporated area outside of the city limits.

Falling Waters State Park, which has a Chipley post office address, is in an unincorporated area outside of the city limits.

== Transportation ==
Tri-County Airport is in an unincorporated area in Holmes County. It is 6 miles (9.7 km) away from Chipley.

== Education ==
It is in the Washington County School District, the sole school district in the county. The district includes Chipley High School.

== Notable people ==
- Marcel Albert, French Air Ace and Hero of the Soviet Union
- Mary Lena Faulk, professional golfer who won the U.S. Women's Amateur
- Trent Forrest, NBA basketball player for the Atlanta Hawks
- Artis Gilmore, NBA Hall of Fame basketball player
- Amasa Coleman Lee, lawyer and legislator in Alabama
- Amp Lee, halfback at Florida State University and in the NFL
- Cody Slate, tight end at Marshall University and in the NFL
- Bert Yancey, Professional Golfers Association player

== Media ==
- The Washington County News
- Foster Folly News
- Chipley Bugle
- Investigator online newspaper
