= Fnnch =

Pseudonymous American street artist

fnnch
- Born: 1986 or 1987 (age 39–40)
- Education: Stanford University
- Known for: Street Art
- Notable work: Honey bears
- Website: fnnch.com

fnnch (pronounced finch) is a pseudonymous American street artist based in San Francisco. He often utilizes stencils and spray paint. His subjects frequently feature nature, such as birds, and pop art imagery, such as his honey bear series.

fnnch's work has been displayed at Burning Man, Stanford Redwood City, and San Francisco LGBT Community Center.

His studio is based in the Mission District.

== Early life ==
fnnch is from Kirkwood, Missouri. As a teenager, he was an illustrator for a video game company. He moved to the San Francisco Bay Area in 2005 to attend college. He graduated from Stanford University with a BA with honors in Economics and a BS in Mathematics. He moved to San Francisco in 2011 and is based in Duboce Triangle, San Francisco.

== Career ==
fnnch's first piece as a street artist was in Duboce Park. His pseudonym is a play on the word "finch," his childhood nickname. He chose to use an alias because his early works were illegally painted onto public property.

In July 2017, fnnch debuted the "9 Cans of LaCroix" nine-piece stencil series at gallery in the Mission District of San Francisco. He sold them for $500 each. San Francisco Chronicle likened it to Andy Warhol's 1962 Campbell's soup cans, saying that "fnnch used the same-sized canvases as Warhol and painted the cans from a similar vantage point." What began as a joke between friends, fnnch said that the series is a tongue-in-cheek commentary on the zeitgeist of the sparkling water brand and how that symbolizes the faltering popularity of soft drinks.

According to the San Francisco Business Journal, his company, Brambling LLC, "saw a 100% increase over 2019, which itself saw a 50% year-over-year increase over 2018 earnings."

=== Philosophy ===
Since his works are often in the public, and sometimes illegal, he said "I wanted to paint something that was positive, inclusive, nostalgic in nature, so that you had this cognitive dissonance where you realize that the piece is illegal and will go away, but you like it, and you want it to stay." On the arts and politics, fnnch has said, "Something that is truly political is divisive, and I want to be additive." He considers art galleries to be undemocratic, noting the 1.2 million people of people who visit SFMOMA annually versus the 25 million people who visit or live in San Francisco.

=== Influences ===
fnnch lists Andy Warhol, Banksy, Jeremy Novy, Frank Stella, and Ellsworth Kelly as some of his influences.

=== Honey bears ===
fnnch began painting honey bears onto mailboxes as a form of street art. The imagery is derived from the bear-shaped honey bottles commonly found in grocery stores. On why he chose to use the honey bear, fnnch said, "I think it's a universal symbol of happiness. It's got nostalgia, it's got desire because it contained sugar, which is something we deeply wanted as kids, and it's an all around positive image." Variations of the bear often incorporate different items and clothing, such as sunglasses and a gold chain to represent Run-DMC.

In January 2018, fnnch plastered 450 honey bear stickers on poles in South of Market and downtown San Francisco to seek the reduction of punishment for the posting of street art stickers and wheat paste adhesives on public property from a misdemeanor to a minor infraction. In order to comply with local laws about postings, fnnch mounted his prints with zip ties.

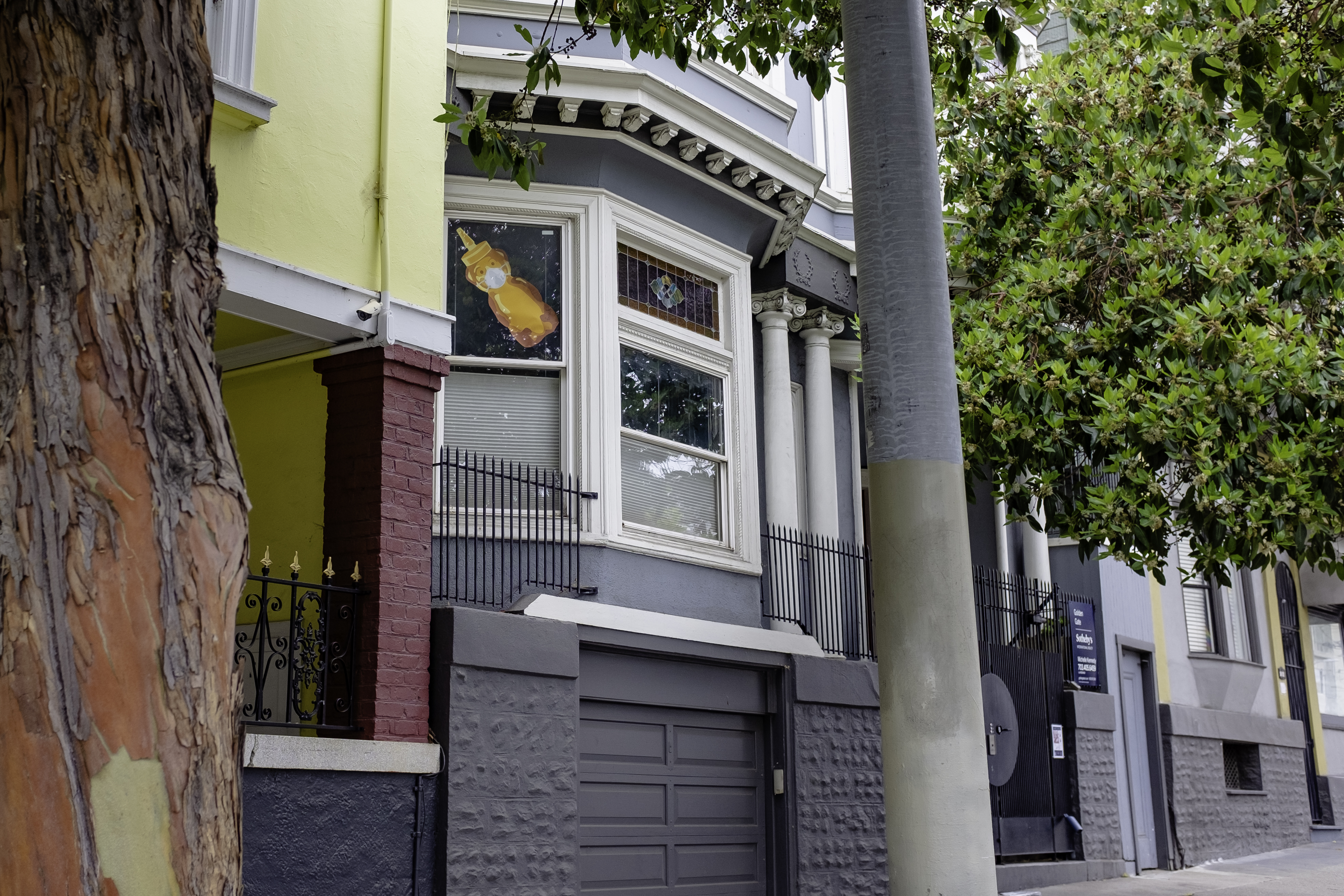
a honey bear print being displayed inside of a private residence in San Francisco (August 2020)

In April 2020, fnnch began wheat-pasting mask and soap themed honey bears onto boarded up businesses in the Castro District of San Francisco as a response to the coronavirus pandemic. He expanded to other neighborhoods in the city within the month. He later launched a painting fundraiser sale, with 50% of profits going towards a local non-profit. In May 2020, fnnch launched the "Honey Bear Hunt" wherein buyers could opt in to a map consisting of other honey bear locations. He went on to sell 20,000 units by March 2021. fnnch conducted other fundraising sales benefitting various non-profits and organizations, such as the Roxie Theater and the Sisters of Perpetual Indulgence. Due to his rise in popularity, he went from donating $12,000 in 2019 to more than $300,000 in 2020.

fnnch released a black honey bear similar to the black squares people posted on social media on Blackout Tuesday to support Black Lives Matter. Commercial artist Sirron Norris raised concerns about the imagery, likening it to blackface, and has gone on to collaborate with fnnch on a variation wherein both artists' signature bears hold up signs supporting Black Lives Matter instead.

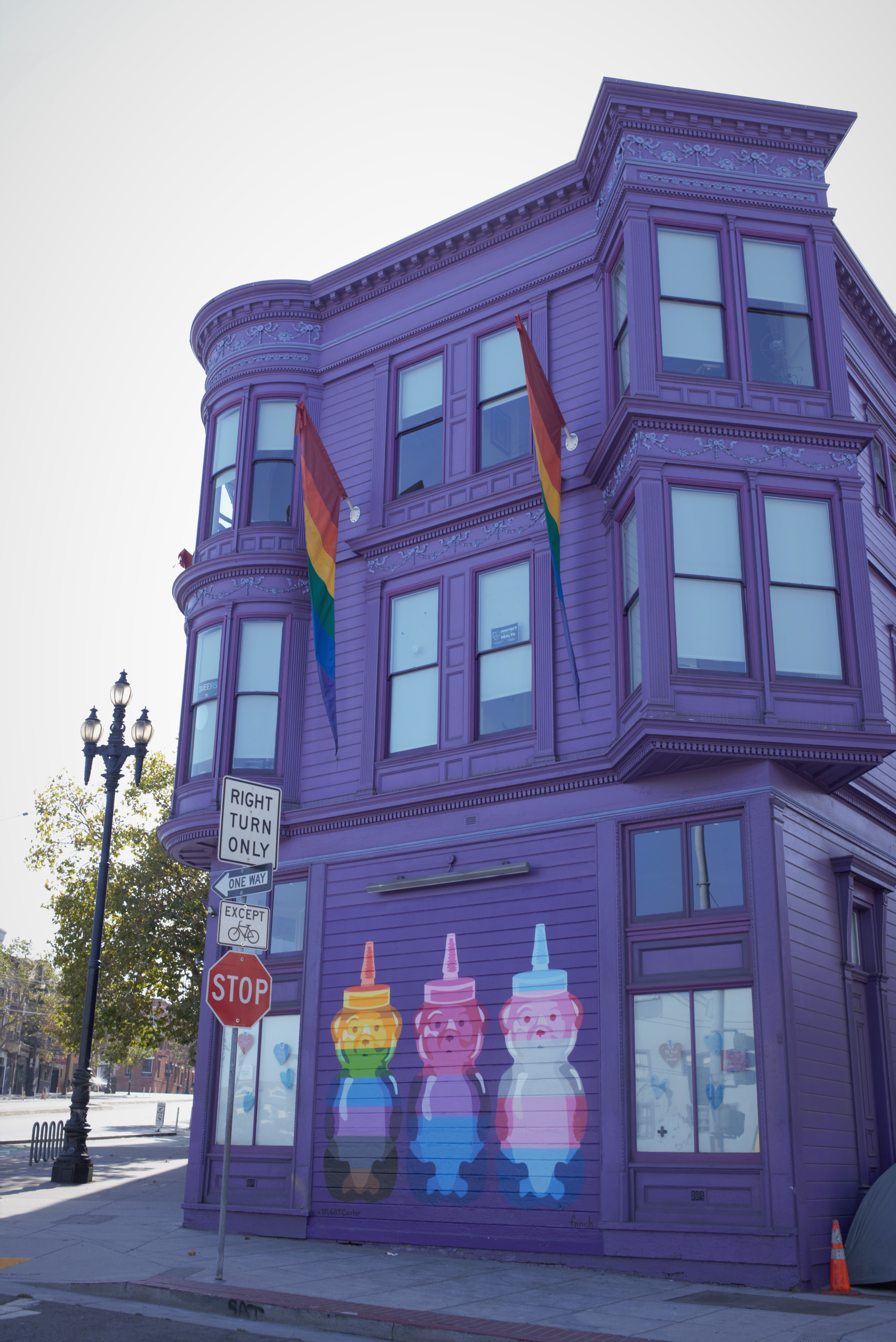
fnnch's honey bear mural outside of the SFLGBT Community Center (October 2020)

fnnch donated a mural depicting three honey bears painted in the colors of three different pride flags to the San Francisco LGBT Community Center in June 2020. The mural was dedicated to fnnch's gay uncle. The mural was vandalized in April 2021 over grievances regarding wall space, and was painted over by the center on April 28, 2021 as a response to community complaints and as part of their rotating mural project.

In April 2021, fnnch partnered with San Francisco Department of Public Health to use the honey bears in a poster ad campaign at bus stops operated by the San Francisco Municipal Transportation Agency encouraging vaccination against the coronavirus in San Francisco. However, the url listed on the posters was incorrect.

Critics have said that the honey bears homogenized the street art scene in San Francisco. In the commentary section for KQED, Rae Alexandra said "In the past 12 months, San Francisco has become so oversaturated with fnnch's honey bears that what was once an occasional sugar rush now feels like a nausea-inducing force-feeding." Street artist Ricky Rat wrote, "I can't claim that the Honey Bear is to blame for the gentrification rampant in the City, but it certainly characterizes that culture. By virtue of its cute, homogeneous ubiquity the Honey Bear is a reminder of the worst qualities of this gentrification — white privilege, corporate power and social conformity."

=== Non-fungible tokens ===
In March 2020, fnnch sold two non-fungible tokens (NFTs) of his works via events hosted on the Clubhouse app. The caricatures of tech founders Mark Zuckerberg, Daniel Ek and Tobias Lütke as honey bears sold for 38.88 Ethereum or about $64,000. Twenty percent of the proceeds went towards COVID-19 relief via GiveDirectly. One half of a digital artwork depicting two halves of a matzo in a digital afikoman, with the other hidden for participants, sold for 2.2 Ethereum or about $4,200.

He has likened the rise of NFTs in 2020 to the dot-com bubble.

== See also ==
- Jeremy Novy — street artist based in San Francisco
