= 34th Street Wall =

Retaining wall in Gainesville, Florida, US

Coordinates: 29.6477°N 82.3722°W

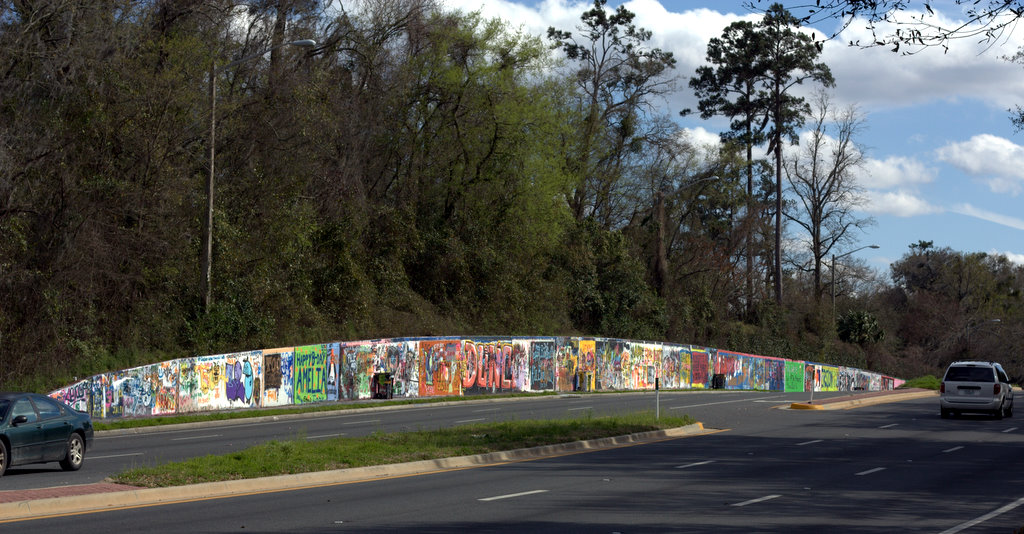
34th Street Wall, March 2010

The 34th Street Wall is a 1,120-foot-long retaining wall along SW 34th Street (Florida State Road 121) in Gainesville, Florida. It was constructed in 1979 by the Florida Department of Transportation to prevent erosion on the adjoining University of Florida golf course when the road was widened from two to four lanes, necessitating cutting through a small hill.

The otherwise nondescript poured concrete wall is notable for being almost entirely covered by graffiti, and it has served as a sort of ever-changing bulletin board for the Gainesville community since the 1980s. Items painted on the wall have included marriage proposals, birthday wishes, graduation announcements, celebration of athletic victories, activist and public awareness statements, tributes, promotions, and memorials, including two permanent memorial panels for victims of the Danny Rolling murders and Gainesville native Tom Petty. Although most of the graffiti is painted by university students and other members of the community, there is occasional tagging and professional art. After decades of use, it is estimated that paint on the center of the wall is about 250 layers thick.

== History and description ==
The 34th Street wall was built by the Florida Department of Transportation in 1979 to support a low hill on the edge of the University of Florida golf course that was sliced in half when the road was widened. Since it adjoins a state highway, the wall is technically owned by the state. Though the city of Gainesville removed graffiti that appeared on the wall soon after it was completed, it gradually became a sort of public bulletin board for the community. Defacing of government property generally violates statutes against vandalism or criminal mischief, but neither the Alachua County Sheriff's Office nor the Gainesville Police Department have ever charged anyone for painting on the wall. There were several unsuccessful attempts to remove the graffiti in the 1980s, including painting the wall white and adding graffiti resistant coating. However, the ever-changing graffiti came to be seen as a local landmark over the following years, and acceding to public sentiment, state and local officials stopped trying to remove the graffiti. In the 1990s, the city installed several trash bins on the adjoining sidewalk to allow for proper disposal of painting supplies.

The wall has occasionally been used for official purposes by the city of Gainesville and the University of Florida, such as promoting public events. The city also helped to ensure that the Danny Rolling victims' memorial was left intact until 2000, when the UF Interfraternity Council took over. In 2006, musician and Gainesville native Tom Petty returned to the city for a concert and was welcomed with a message painted on the wall. Petty was presented with a photo of this section of the wall along with the Gainesville key to the city during the visit.

When the city planned to resurface 34th Street and widen the bicycle lanes in the early 2000s, the project originally called for the removal of part of the wall. Public outcry caused the plans to be changed, and the median was narrowed for about a block so that the wall could be left intact.

== Memorials ==
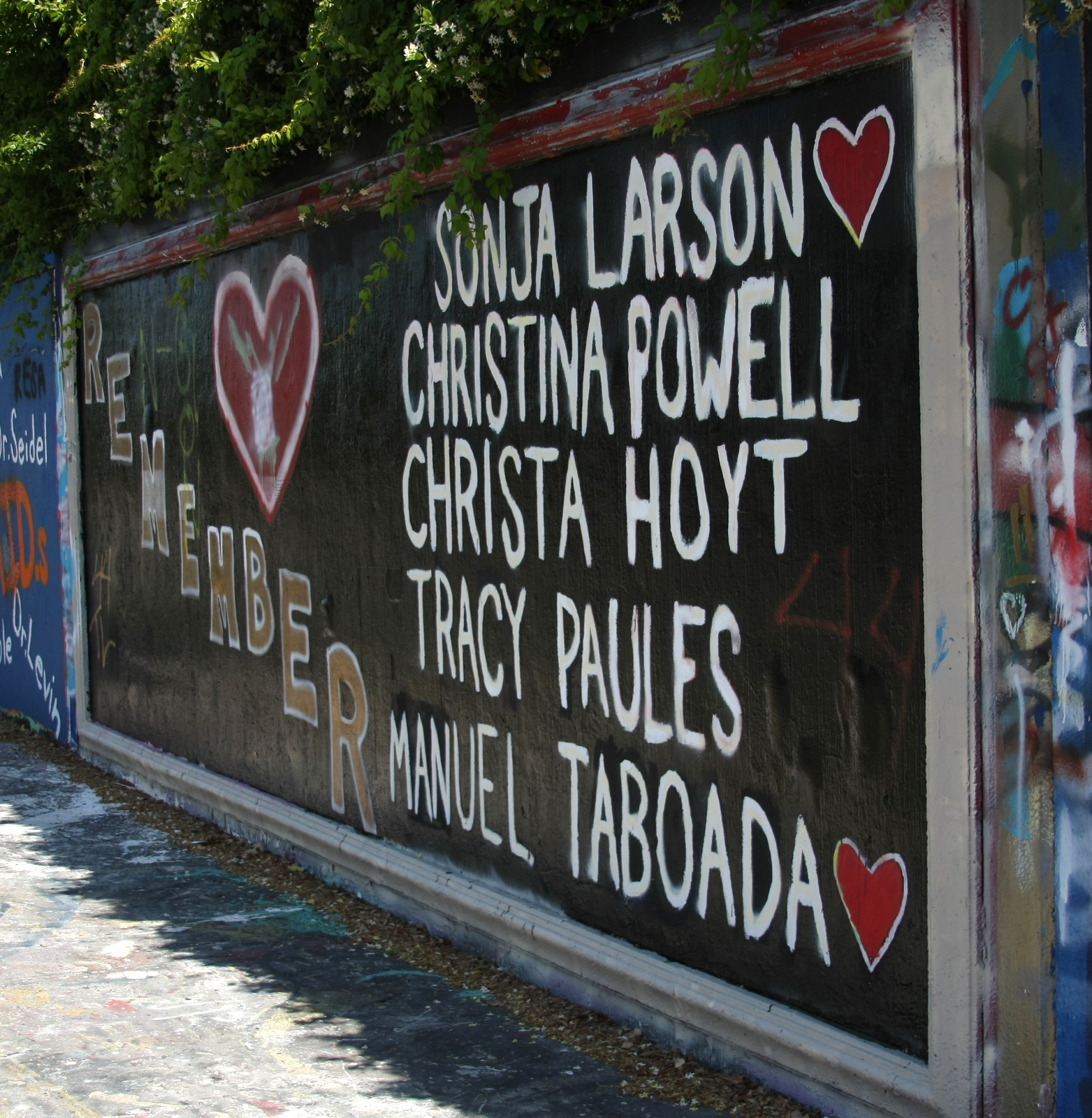
The Rolling victim memorial in May 2009

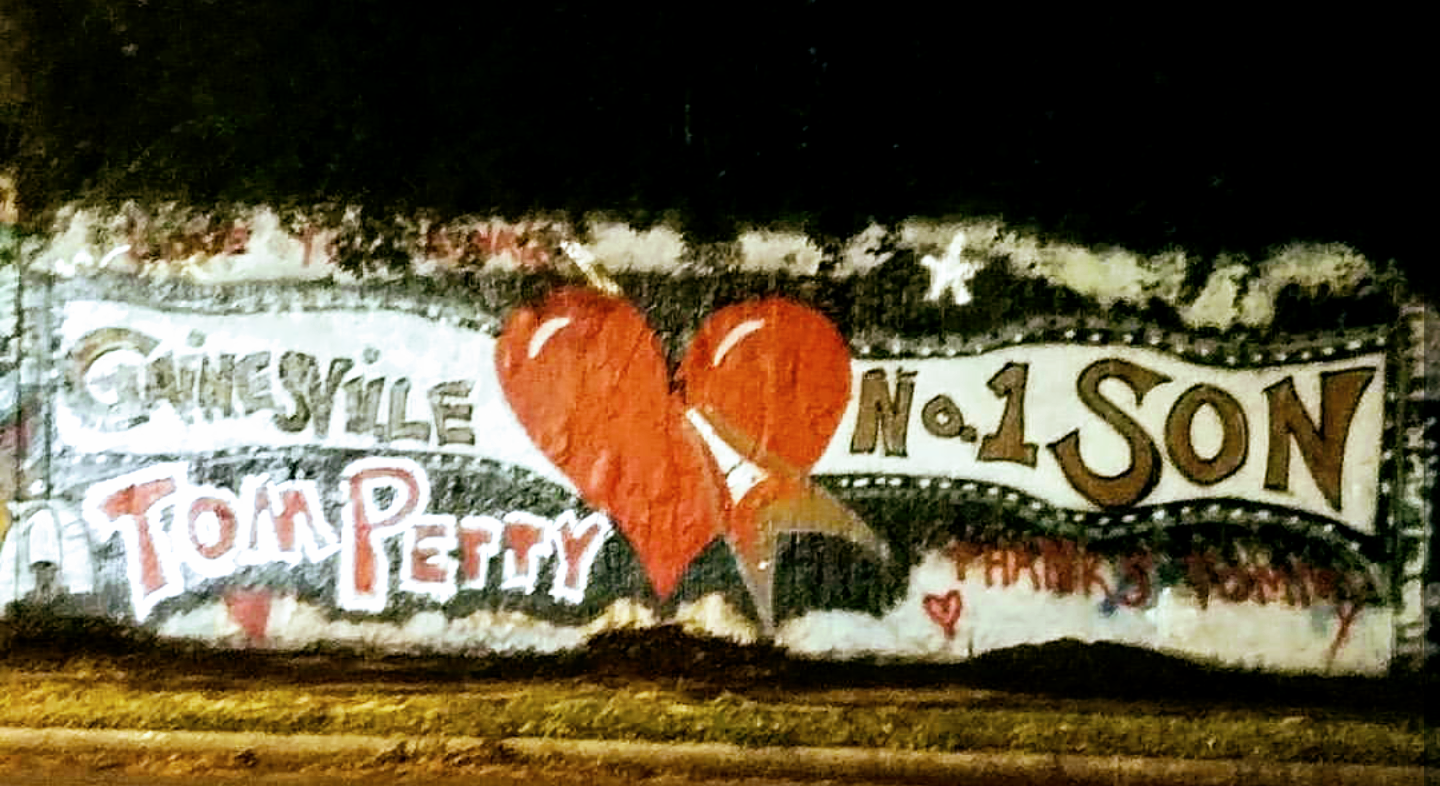
Tom Petty memorial soon after his death in 2017

One of the more notable sections on the wall is a tribute to the victims of the Danny Rolling murders. The memorial lists the names of the five students who were killed, and was first painted in 1990 using black, red, and white paint by Adam Byrn Tritt. Although it has been painted over or defaced several times, it is always repaired quickly, and the panel is regularly touched up as most of the wall around it changes continuously. At the memorial's 20 year anniversary, a plaque was added to the panel which reads "In remembrance of those individuals who lost their lives in 1990: Sonja Larson, Christina Powell, Christa Hoyt, Tracy Paules, Manuel Taboada. You will never be forgotten."

Hours after musician and Gainesville native Tom Petty died on October 2, 2017, a large memorial panel appeared beside that of Rolling's victims. Petty's memorial changes slightly over time but usually includes the messages "Gainesville's No. 1 Son" and "Thanks, Tommy" along with the logo of his band, the Heartbreakers. The tribute was originally painted by local artist Steve Blake Harrison, who maintained both the Petty and student victim memorials until his death in 2024. It was inadvertently painted over in 2026 but was restored by volunteers working with local and visiting members of the Facebook group Tom Petty Nation.

== Gallery ==
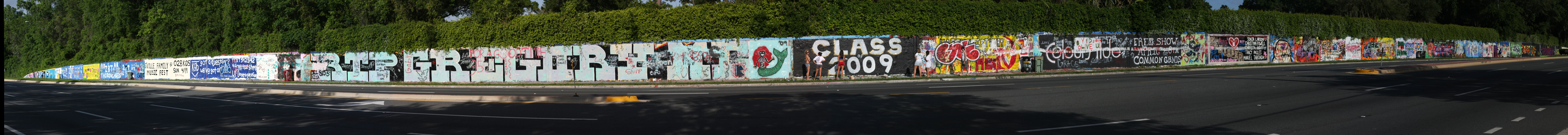
A panorama of the wall in April 2009

== See also ==
- 5 Pointz – Graffitied building in Queens, New York
- Berlin Wall graffiti art – Underground street art on the Berlin Border
- Lennon Wall – Wall in Prague, Czech Republic
- Newtown area graffiti and street art – Culture in Sydney, Australia
- San Francisco Bay Area Street Art
- The Houston Bowery Wall – Mural wall in New York City
- Venice Art Walls – Art walls in Venice, Los Angeles, California, U.S.
