= Sondra London =

American writer

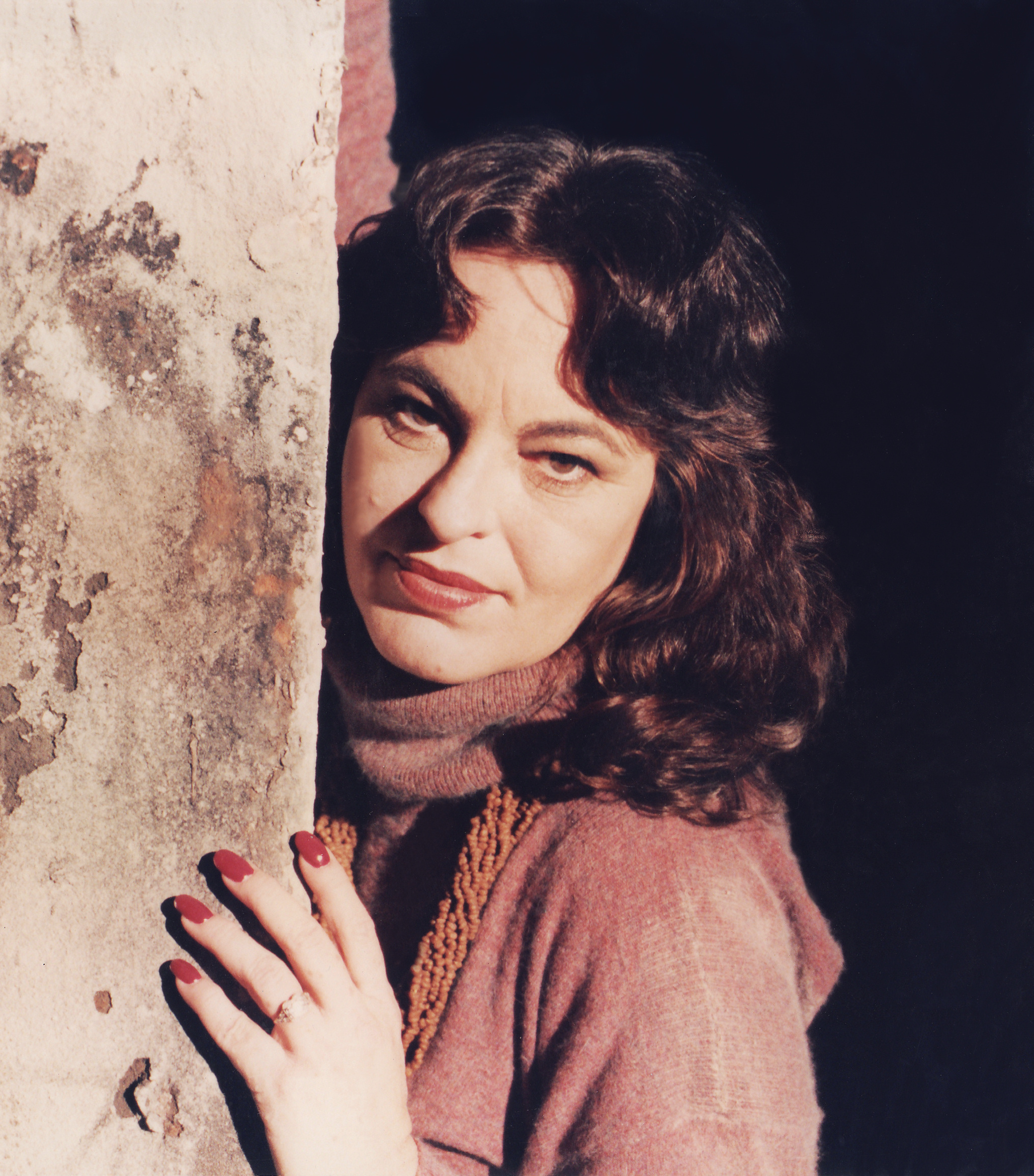
- London in 2000
- Born: Sandi Stewart; 1947 (age 78–79); Florida
- Occupation: True crime author
- Partner: Danny Rolling (fiancée)

Sondra London (born 1947 in Florida) is a controversial American true crime author. A onetime girlfriend of convicted murderer and suspected serial killer Gerard John Schaefer and the fiancée of convicted serial killer Danny Rolling (later executed for his crimes), she interviewed both and published the results. Feral House published London's study of vampirism, True Vampires, in 2004. The book is illustrated by French killer Nicolas Claux. In 2016, she published Good Little Soldiers: A Memoir of True Horror.

== Writing ==
In a documentary by Errol Morris, London related how she first was inspired to write about crime after reaching a plateau in her career as a technical writer. London interviewed incarcerated serial killer Gerard John Schaefer, whom she had dated in high school shortly before his graduation in 1964, at length following his conviction; she later published a compilation of his short stories and drawings entitled Killer Fiction in 1990. A second book, Beyond Killer Fiction, followed two years later. The stories within Killer Fiction and Beyond Killer Fiction typically involve the graphic torture, mutilation and murder of young women, usually penned from the perspective of the killer, who is often a rogue police officer.

A revised edition of Killer Fiction, published after Schaefer's death, included numerous stories and rambling articles from the first two books and a collection of letters to London, in which Schaefer claimed to be responsible for the murders of scores of women and girls. He also claimed that fellow serial killer inmate Ted Bundy, whom he labeled a "tyro" by comparison to himself, both admired and envied him; he also accused Bundy of "playing at copycat" regarding his own crimes.

London ended her collaboration with Schaefer in 1991, shortly after publicly repudiating his claims that he was merely a "framed ex-cop" who wrote lurid fiction. Upon hearing that he had been publicly rebuked by London, Schaefer allegedly repeatedly threatened her life. One of the many frivolous lawsuits he filed was directed against her for publicly referring to him as a serial killer in print format. In support of London's defense against this lawsuit, she compiled an exhibit of photocopies of five hundred incriminating pages of Schaefer's handwritten correspondence. The judge immediately dismissed Schaefer's lawsuit. His aforementioned lawsuits against Newton and Wilson were likewise dismissed after London provided copies of the five-hundred page exhibit to them; his lawsuit against Kendrick was still ongoing at the time of Schaefer's 1995 murder.

London collaborated with serial killer Danny Rolling in writing The Making of a Serial Killer: The Real Story of the Gainesville Murders, a psychological memoir which included Rolling's confessions to five murders, along with other capital crimes for which he had not been charged. The book was published by Feral House and was illustrated by 50 pictures hand drawn by Rolling in prison. The confessions were published in a three-part series appearing in the Globe. London and Rolling were sued by the State of Florida under a version of the Son of Sam law. Rolling's relationship with London, which developed while he was behind bars, was the focus of an episode of Errol Morris' First Person. Both became romantically involved, eventually becoming engaged. The series overviewed their romance, his artwork, and his supposed feelings of remorse over the crimes he committed. It also included a segment of Rolling using one of his hearings as an opportunity to publicly display his affection, serenading London in the courtroom.

== Television ==
In 2000, an episode of director Errol Morris's First Person television series centered on Sondra London. She has appeared on Dateline NBC, Turning Point, Larry King Live, Geraldo, Leeza, A Current Affair, and Court TV in the United States; Channel 4 and BBC in UK; German and French cable, and Australian ABC.

== AOL boycott ==
In September 1997, America Online (AOL) was threatened with a boycott due to London's website, "Serial Killers talk to Sondra London". Then-Governor of Wyoming Jim Geringer and child advocate Marc Klaas called for the boycott. They objected to the site which included writings of serial killers including Keith Hunter Jesperson who had been convicted of three killings in Oregon and was facing extradition to Wyoming in regard to another killing. AOL took down the site within hours. In October 1997, London was interviewed by Larry King on Larry King Live in regard to the website's removal in an episode dealing with the right of free speech. London said the site's information could help gain insight into the thinking of serial killers. One document included Jesperson's response to the question of why he killed people. Free speech advocates protested, and the website was restored.
