= Gerard John Schaefer =

American murderer and suspected serial killer

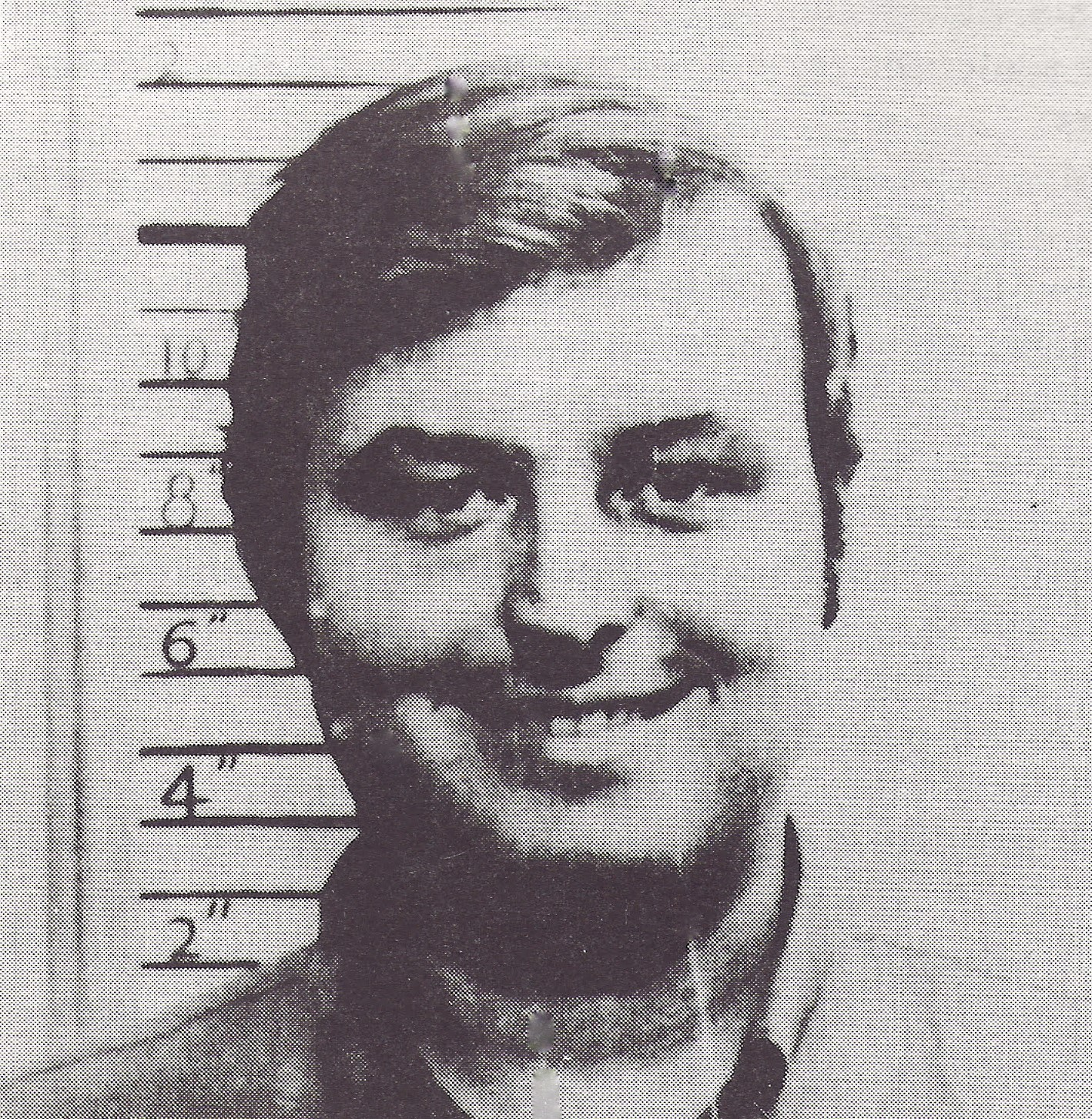
- September 1970 Wilton Manors police applicant photo of Schaefer
- Born: March 26, 1946; Neenah, Wisconsin, U.S.
- Died: December 3, 1995 (aged 49); Florida State Prison, Florida, U.S.
- Cause of death: Multiple stab wounds to face, head, neck and body. Slash wound to throat.
- Other names: Jerry Shepherd; The Killer Cop; The Hangman; The Butcher of Blind Creek
- Spouses: Martha Fogg (m. 1968; div. 1970); Teresa Dean (m. 1971; div. 1973)
- Motive: Sexual sadism; Possession; Necrophilia
- Convictions: First degree murder (2 counts); Aggravated assault
- Penalty: Life imprisonment (x2)

Details
- Victims: 2–28+
- Span of crimes: September 27, 1972 (confirmed); October 2, 1966 – January 11, 1973 (suspected)
- Country: United States
- State: Florida
- Date apprehended: April 7, 1973
- Imprisoned at: Florida State Prison

Gerard John Schaefer Jr. (March 26, 1946 – December 3, 1995) was an American murderer and suspected serial killer, known as the Killer Cop, the Hangman and the Butcher of Blind Creek, who was convicted of the 1972 murder and mutilation of two teenage girls in Port St. Lucie, Florida. He is suspected of up to twenty-six other murders.

Described by prosecutor Robert Stone as "the most sexually deviant person" he had ever encountered, Schaefer was sentenced to two terms of life imprisonment at his 1973 trial, to be served at Florida State Prison. He was stabbed to death by a fellow inmate while incarcerated at this facility in December 1995.

Schaefer became known as the "Killer Cop" as he was a sheriff's deputy in Martin County, Florida, at the time of his initial arrest. He also became known as the "Hangman" due to his favored practice of binding restrained women to trees with a hangman's noose around their neck prior to their torture and murder.

== Early life ==
Gerard Schaefer was born in Neenah, Wisconsin, on March 26, 1946, the first of three children born to Gerard John Schaefer Sr. and Doris Marie Schaefer (née Runcie). His father was a traveling salesman, and his mother a housewife. Schaefer was raised in Nashville, Tennessee, and, later, in Atlanta, Georgia, where he attended Marist Academy until his family permanently relocated to Fort Lauderdale, Florida, in 1960.

Schaefer later described his childhood as "troubled and turbulent," largely due to the frequent family relocations, his father's alcoholism, and his father's frequent verbal abuse of his wife and children. Although the elder Schaefer's occupation resulted in his being frequently absent from the household, he had a difficult relationship with his older son, who resented the frequent belittlement and believed his father favored his sister over himself and his brother. By contrast, Schaefer was close to his mother, who was extremely protective of her children.

As a child, Schaefer preferred outdoor pursuits. By his adolescence, he had developed an interest in nature. His primary interests as a teenager included collecting guns, hunting and fishing—activities that he and his father occasionally pursued together when his father was at home. Although hardly a classic loner, Schaefer's classmates at St. Thomas Aquinas High School recall him "not being part of any clique." He frequently pursued his interests alone, leading his family and peers alike to view him as an "outdoors man" who held aspirations to become a forest ranger.

=== Adolescence and high school ===
By his teenage years, Schaefer developed erotic fantasies of hurting women whom he deemed worthy of his contempt. These fantasies gradually evolved into his developing a penchant for sadomasochism and bondage, and deriving pleasure from inflicting pain upon himself—occasionally as he wore women's underwear—until he achieved orgasm via autoerotic asphyxia. Typically, these sexual rituals involved Schaefer tying himself to a tree in rural locations. These fantasies would increase in terms of frequency and intensity with time, gradually dominating many of his waking hours.

Schaefer also became a peeping tom in his mid-teens and is known to have developed the habit of cross dressing. (Note: Schaefer later claimed to have formed this habit solely in order for him to successfully avoid the draft during the Vietnam War.) Although he dated in his high school years, several female classmates viewed him with disdain. One former classmate, Barbara Krolick, later recollected: "I can't remember him being friends with any of the guys. He was always on the outside looking in. As a matter of fact, the only thing I really remember is that I always had to tuck my skirt under my legs because [Schaefer] would practically stand on his head to look up a girl's skirt."

Schaefer was considered a promising student by his teachers; contemporary records reveal his being a member of the varsity football team during his sophomore and junior years, and he is known to have been an excellent golfer. He graduated from St. Thomas Aquinas High School in June 1964 and briefly worked as a fishing guide in the Everglades before enrolling at Broward Community College.

== College years ==
Schaefer initially enrolled as a social studies major at Broward Community College in September 1964 before switching his focus to teaching, in which he achieved average grades. Upon completion of his sophomore year at Broward, he applied for and was accepted for scholarship at Florida Atlantic University (FAU) in Boca Raton, where he began his studies in 1968 with aspirations to obtain a Bachelor of Arts in education.

=== Marriage ===
In December 1968, Schaefer married his fiancée, Martha "Marti" Louise Fogg, a fellow FAU student two years his junior whom he had met at Broward, and with whom he had briefly toured in her patriotic singing troupe Sing-Out 66, which offered an alternative to the contemporary hippie movement. The couple rented a property on SW 22nd Street in Fort Lauderdale, although their relationship soon soured both due to Schaefer's incessant demands for sex and his spending much of his free time hunting. The two divorced in May 1970, his wife citing Schaefer's extreme cruelty as the reason for their separation. Shortly thereafter, Schaefer formed a brief relationship with a physically disabled woman whom he encountered at a Fort Lauderdale mental health clinic, although the couple soon separated.

== Career ==
=== Teacher ===
In March 1969, Schaefer successfully applied for a student teaching internship at Plantation High School. He began this position on September 23, primarily teaching geography. However, he was fired on November 7 for refusing to accept advice from his superiors and for continually attempting to impose his own moral and/or political opinions upon his students, which had led to the school receiving numerous complaints from parents. Shortly thereafter, Schaefer unsuccessfully applied for a student teaching position at Boca Raton Community High School.

Four months later, in March 1970, Schaefer successfully applied for another teaching internship. This application was accepted, and he began teaching geography at Stranahan High School in April. Contemporary progress reports indicate Schaefer performed poorly at Stranahan High, with his superiors noting both his arrogance and his "very limited" knowledge of the subject he taught. Seven weeks after Schaefer commenced this teaching position, the principal of Stranahan High informed him of the school's decision to withdraw him from the internship by May, after which his career as a student teacher formally ended.

=== Police officer ===
Shortly after the termination of Schaefer's teaching career, he vacationed in Europe and North Africa before returning to Florida, where he briefly worked for the Wackenhut Corporation as a security guard as he pondered his next career move. In September 1970, Schaefer applied for a vacancy within the Wilton Manors police department. He failed to disclose the fact he had twice been fired from student teaching positions within the previous year, instead falsely claiming to have acquired two years' experience as a research assistant at FAU and to have recently returned to the U.S. from Morocco. Schaefer's previous work history was not verified, and he was formally inducted into the Broward County Police Department in September 1971, graduating as a patrolman at the end of the year at age 25.

In January 1971, seven months before Schaefer began his career as a police officer, he met a 19-year-old secretary named Teresa Dean while still working as a security guard. The two soon became engaged, and married in Fort Lauderdale on September 11 that year. According to Schaefer, his second marriage was more harmonious than his first. His second wife willingly acquiesced to his frequent sexual demands, and also shared his passion for fishing in locations such as the Florida Keys.

Schaefer's tenure with the Wilton Manors police lasted only six months. Although he earned commendation from his superiors, on one occasion relating to his conduct during a March 1972 police raid on a drug house, his general performance was considered poor. He was dismissed from his position when his superiors discovered his habit of stopping cars driven by female motorists who had committed minor traffic infractions, then entering their license plate numbers into a database to obtain further personal details about them before contacting them to request dates.

Shortly before this dismissal, Schaefer had begun searching for a better-paying law enforcement position elsewhere. He began his service as a deputy with the Martin County sheriff's department in June 1972, having forged a letter of recommendation from Wilton Manors endorsing his application. A standard background check revealed he had no criminal record.

=== Abductions ===
On the afternoon of July 21, 1972, Schaefer encountered two teenage hitchhikers named Nancy Ellen Trotter (18) and Paula Sue Wells (17) while on official police duty; he drove the pair to their intended destination of Stuart, although he cautioned the girls against the perils of hitchhiking. Upon learning neither girl was native to Florida, and that the two intended to travel to Jensen Beach the following day, Schaefer proposed to drive them to the location. The girls accepted his offer, and agreed to meet him at a bandstand on East Ocean Boulevard at 9:15 a.m. The following morning, Schaefer arrived at the bandstand at the prearranged time. On this occasion, he was not wearing his uniform and was driving his own vehicle, although he convinced Trotter and Wells he was still on duty, having been switched to plain clothed, undercover duties and thus driving an unmarked vehicle.

Shortly after the girls entered the vehicle, Shaefer deviated from their intended route on the pretext of showing the girls an "old Spanish fort" near Hutchinson Island. En route, he again briefly lectured the girls against accepting lifts from random strangers and the dangers of being "sold into white slavery" before stopping the vehicle close to a dilapidated shed deep inside a remote wooded area, where he handcuffed and gagged the girls. He then took one victim to a large cypress tree close to the Indian River, tying her legs to the trunk just below her knees before binding a noose around her neck, which he affixed to a branch in such a manner as to force her to stand upon the exposed roots to counter the pressure from the noose. Schaefer then took the other victim to another tree a short distance away where she too was bound in a similar manner in which she was forced to stand upon a narrow exposed tree root as a makeshift, sloping plinth to counter the pressure from the noose around her neck. Both were informed they were to be raped and murdered.

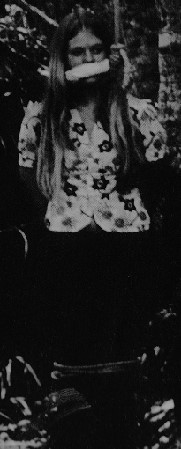
Nancy Trotter reenacts her binding and restraint by Schaefer for a Martin County police photographer

At that moment, Schaefer received an urgent radio dispatch informing him to immediately report to the police station. He left both girls bound and standing upon their plinths, vowing that he would soon return and exclaiming to one of his captives, "I gotta go!" Both girls were warned not to "try to run away, 'cause I'm not going to be very far down the road", with Schaefer claiming he was to confer with the individual he intended to sell them to.

==== Captives' escape ====
When Schaefer returned to the forest approximately two hours later, he discovered that both girls had escaped; he immediately returned home to call his station, where he informed Sheriff Robert Crowder: "I've done something very foolish; you'll be mad at me." Schaefer then proceeded to explain that he had decided to teach two girls "a lesson" on the risks of hitchhiking but "overdid the job". He then proceeded to explain he had abandoned the two in the general swampland area of Hutchinson Island, not far from the Indian River.

Crowder and Lieutenant Melvin Waldron immediately proceeded to Florida State Road A1A, where—close by the highway—they discovered a desperate, partially-gagged teenage girl with her hands pinioned behind her back swimming via a flutter kick in a subtropical river. As the officers slowed to a halt, they observed the distraught girl clamber from the riverbank with sections of her jeans and blouse shredded, attempting to gesticulate for their attention. Upon removing the gag from the girl's mouth, the officers heard her identify herself as "Nancy", sputtering her friend was somewhere in the forest. To Trotter's relief, she was informed that a truck driver had discovered Wells staggering through the woodland in the direction towards the highway approximately forty-five minutes earlier, and that her friend was already at the police station.

== Initial arrest ==
Trotter was driven to the station, where she and Wells recounted their ordeal to Crowder. Both girls stated they had managed to escape from their bindings by gingerly writhing against their restraints and loosening their gags with their teeth as they maintained their balance upon the exposed tree roots; each stated the process of freeing themselves had taken considerable time, and that they had been acutely aware that, had they slipped, they would have hanged. Both girls provided a detailed description of their assailant and his vehicle, (Note: Trotter and Wells each described Schaefer's vehicle as having a distinctive bumper hitch from which Schaefer had tied one end of a rope to before throwing the other over a tree branch, explaining he intended to use the vehicle to "haul [them] up" to a height from which he intended to hang them.) before formally identifying Schaefer as the individual responsible for their ordeal.

Although Schaefer repeated his insistence that he had simply overreacted in his efforts to demonstrate the dangers of hitchhiking to the two young women, his story was not believed; he was dismissed from the force and placed under arrest, with Crowder instructing his officers to file charges of false imprisonment and aggravated assault against him. These charges were filed the following month.

=== Bail ===
Approximately two weeks after his arrest, Schaefer posted a $15,000 bail, thus he remained at liberty prior to his scheduled November 1972 trial. He returned to the house he and his second wife rented in Stuart; his wife and in-laws noted no change in his demeanor—believing his claim to have simply been "trying to teach [the hitchhikers] a lesson". As Schaefer awaited trial, he obtained menial employment at Kwik Chek.

== Murders ==
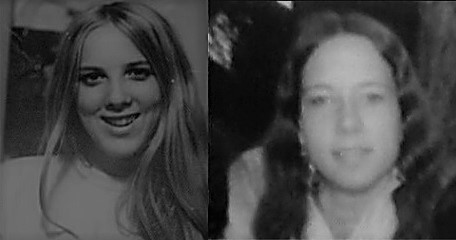
Susan Place (left), and Georgia Jessup

=== Place and Jessup ===
On September 27, 1972, Schaefer abducted two teenage friends, seventeen-year-old Susan Carol Place and sixteen-year-old Georgia Marie Jessup. The two had encountered Schaefer while all three attended an adult education center in Fort Lauderdale. Place had opted to attend the adult education center due to bullying she had occasionally endured from classmates due to her epilepsy and mild paralysis of the left side of her body; Jessup—although an academically achieving student—had enrolled due to attendance and disciplinary issues. Schaefer introduced himself to the girls as "Jerry Shepherd", claiming to hail from Colorado and stating that he intended to return there following a trip to Mexico; he likely feigned interest in Jessup's fascination with the concept of reincarnation and ESP in addition to Place's love of music in order to ingratiate himself with both girls and gain their trust.

On the afternoon of their disappearance, Place's mother, Lucille, arrived home to find her daughter "straightening her room" as Jessup sat upon a chair in the bedroom; both introduced Lucille to a man in his twenties whom they referred to as "Jerry". Place initially informed her mother that she, Jessup and "Jerry" intended to travel from Fort Lauderdale "to the beach and play guitar". Although Place's mother remained suspicious, "Jerry" assured her his intentions were noble; nonetheless, she noted the vehicle registration of his 1969 Datsun. Place confirmed her mother's suspicions that she intended to leave home, although she tearfully assured her that she would be gone "just for a little while" and that she would remain in contact. The girls left the Place household with "Jerry" at approximately 8:45 p.m. (Note: Shortly prior to her daughter's disappearance, Lucille had learned her daughter and Jessup had planned to travel together to Colorado to meet a friend with whom they could stay. Place had informed her mother that a "good guy" who resembled "Hoss of the Cartwrights on Bonanza", who hailed from the state, had agreed to drive them.)

When Place had not returned after four days, Lucille first contacted Jessup's mother, Shirley, only to learn her daughter had "run away" on September 27, and that she likewise had not heard from either girl since. Both girls were subsequently reported missing to the Oakland Park police. Lucille provided investigators with the vehicle registration she had noted, in addition to a physical description of the man the girls had left her home with. The registration was traced to an entirely separate model of vehicle belonging to a St. Petersburg resident who did not resemble "Jerry Shepherd" and who had a firm alibi for the date of the girls' disappearance. The sole Jerry Shepherd registered as living in Fort Lauderdale was also eliminated from police inquiries and by early-1973, the teenagers' disappearance had largely become a cold case.

==== Suspected further murders ====
Fourteen-year-old Mary Alice Briscolina and thirteen-year-old Elsie Lina Farmer vanished while hitchhiking to a Commercial Boulevard restaurant from a Lauderdale-by-the-Sea motel on October 26, 1972, less than one month after Place and Jessup were last seen alive. Their bodies were separately recovered in undergrowth close to Sunrise Boulevard, not far from the city of Plantation, early the following year—both with legs spread apart. Briscolina had been extensively beaten about the head, with one blow to her skull proving fatal. Several of her fingernails had been torn from her body, indicating a ferocious physical struggle with her killer. Farmer had also been bludgeoned to death.

Subsequent questioning of Briscolina's friends revealed she and Farmer frequently visited a Lauderdale-by-the-Sea apartment rented by the older sister of Briscolina's boyfriend, and that an individual these acquaintances recalled as a "Gary Shepherd" had been known to Briscolina. This individual—whom several identified as Schaefer—had also claimed to be an "ex-Wilton Manors police officer."

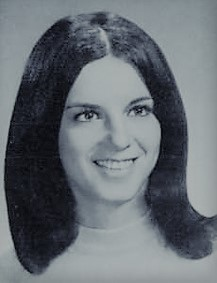
Barbara Ann Wilcox

Three months later, on January 11, 1973, hitchhikers Collete Marie Goodenough and Barbara Ann Wilcox, both nineteen years old, disappeared while hitchhiking from Sioux City, Iowa, to Florida. Both were last seen alive in Biloxi, Mississippi. Their disappearances occurred while Schaefer remained free prior to beginning his sentence for the abductions of Trotter and Wells. He is known to have made a long-distance phone call from Cedar Rapids, Iowa, to his Florida residence shortly before Goodenough and Wilcox's disappearance, and may have encountered the two while returning to Florida. Their scattered skeletal remains were discovered close to a large tree and an orange crate in January 1977. Both victims had been bound together with baling wire, and impressions upon the tree branches—coupled with the actual positioning of the orange crate—indicate one or both victims had been suspended from the tree as their murderer sat or stood upon the orange crate.

== Initial imprisonment ==
In December 1972, Schaefer appeared in court in relation to the Trotter and Wells abductions. Due to a plea bargain his attorney strongly recommended he accept, Schaefer was able to plead guilty to just one charge of aggravated assault, for which he received a sentence of one year in jail with the possibility of parole after six months, to be followed by three years' probation.

Upon passing sentence on December 22, Judge D. C. Smith lambasted Schaefer, informing him: "It is beyond the court's imagination to conceive how you were such a foolish and astronomic jackass as you were in this case." He allowed Schaefer's formal sentencing to be postponed until "after the holidays", and Schaefer began serving his sentence in Martin County jail on January 15, 1973. Upon leaving court on December 22, Schaefer informed several reporters: "I made a stupid mistake. There was no sex involved... no one was hurt."

=== Developments ===
In March 1973, Lucille Place discovered a letter penned by "Jerry Shepherd" in her daughter's bedroom; she drove to the return address upon the letter—333 Martin Avenue in Stuart—only to learn from the building manager that "Jerry Shepherd" had registered at the property under his real name, Gerard Schaefer, and that he had recently been sent to jail for the abduction and attempted hanging of two girls.

As Lucille and her husband, Ira, drove around the county, she realized investigators had likely incorrectly noted Schaefer's license plate number as being registered in Pinellas County as opposed to Martin County, given the fact most license plates she observed in Martin County began with "42" and not the "4" of Pinellas County, which investigators had previously informed her was the location of the plate she had provided. Upon relaying this new information to police, Lucille discovered the plate she had noted actually belonged to a blue-green Datsun registered to one Gerard Schaefer, who resided at 333 Martin Avenue. When questioned, Schaefer denied ever having encountered Place or her parents, although Lucille positively identified a Wilton Manors personnel photograph of Schaefer as "Jerry Shepherd."

== Discoveries ==
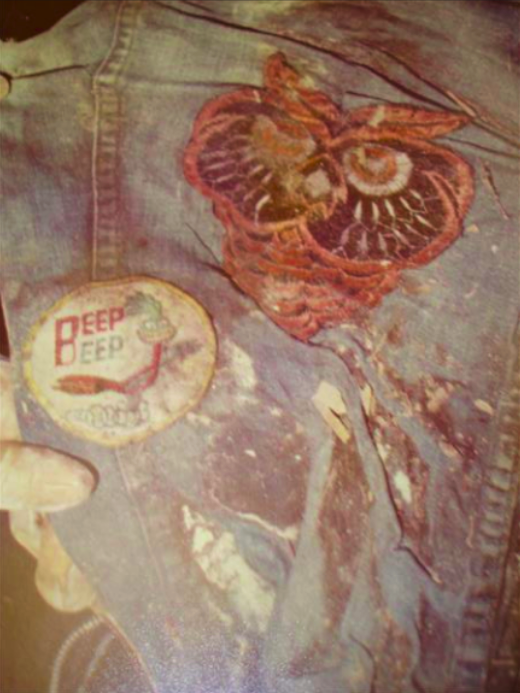
St. Lucie County Sheriff's Department crime scene photograph of the jeans worn by Georgia Jessup with their distinctive Road Runner emblem

On the afternoon of April 1, 1973, a father and son searching for discarded aluminum cans discovered the extensively decomposed remains of two individuals scattered within and around a hole dug among trees in Oak Hammock Park, Port Saint Lucie, Florida. The location of this grave was 212 feet (65 m) from the nearest dirt road; the grave itself was two feet, three inches (0.69 m) deep.

Deep scratch marks were evident upon the base of the tree immediately alongside the gravesite, close to where sections of a torso had been bound to the base of the trunk. One victim wore the remnants of blue jeans emblazoned with a circular emblem of the Road Runner, whereas the other was completely nude, and a pile of clothing belonging to the decedents was discovered in nearby undergrowth. Sections of both bodies had evidently been disinterred and scattered by wildlife. The location of the discoveries was approximately six miles from where Trotter and Wells had been held captive prior to their escape the previous summer. (Note: The upper portions of both girls' skulls were never recovered.)

Both girls had been bound and murdered, with their spinal cords severed at the lumbar and cervical section and several bones completely severed with a knife or machete. Their bodies had been decapitated after death and their jawbones had sustained numerous fractures. One set of remains, later identified as Place, had also sustained a gunshot wound to her lower jaw consistent with having been inflicted by a .22 caliber pistol. Furthermore, sections of wearing of tree bark upon a banyan tree approximately 9 feet (2.7 m) from the grave indicated one or both victims had been suspended from this tree long enough to leave welt impressions within the bark prior to their deaths. The initials "G.J." had also been carved into a tree trunk, the roots of which bore several deep knife, machete or ax incisions containing torn sections of clothing fibers.

=== Identification ===
The bodies were taken to the Dade County Medical Examiner's Department, where Dr. Richard Souviron formally identified the victims via dental records and healed bone fractures as Place and Jessup on April 5. Shortly thereafter, Schaefer was informed of the identifications; he immediately requested the representation of a public defender. The individual appointed as his legal representative was Elton Schwartz.

The location of these discoveries and the decedents' identities, plus the similarities in the modus operandi of the method of abduction and murder of Place and Jessup to Schaefer's earlier captivity of Trotter and Wells, led police in Broward County and Martin County to obtain search warrants for Schaefer's house and vehicle, as well as the home of his mother after Lucille Place formally identified Schaefer as being the man she had last seen with her daughter and Jessup.

=== Search warrants ===
==== Broward County ====
Inside a locked bedroom at the Fort Lauderdale residence of Schaefer's mother, police found over 300 pages of lurid stories (occasionally accompanied by crude illustrations) Schaefer had both penned and typed over the course of several years. These stories detailed the kidnapping, humiliation, rape and execution by hanging of a number of teenage girls and young women whom he routinely referred to as "whores", "sluts" and "harlots", including two named "Belinda" and "Carmen" and an unidentified woman whom he graphically describes hanging at an unknown location close to Powerline Road.

Several of these narratives indicate Schaefer had forced his victims to drink beverages—typically beer or wine—as they stood upon makeshift plinths with a noose around their necks so that he could observe them urinate prior to their hanging. He had frequently returned to his crime scenes weeks or months after the actual murders in order to commit acts of necrophilia with buried and dismembered bodies, or to extract teeth from the skull. His writings also revealed his fascination with historical methods of torture and execution, and the pleasure he derived from observing acutely distressed females urinate and/or defecate prior to and at the time of their hanging. (Note: The earliest documented record of Schaefer's fascination with the legality and morality of capital punishment—in particular the executional method of hanging—dates from a May 1970 letter he penned to a publishing firm in which he references his having read Arthur Koestler's Reflections on Hanging and his subsequent intrigue in reading of women scheduled to hang being "required to wear waterproof underwear on the morning of their execution" and of his dismay in being unable to locate further information. Schaefer closed this letter with a sentence indicating he hoped the magazine would locate and publish further information on this topic.)

Also found at the Fort Lauderdale residence were eleven guns, bags filled with live and spent cartridges, thirteen hunting knives, sections of rope and scores of softcore pornographic magazines which he had modified to depict nude, urinating women bound with ropes, hanging from trees or other makeshift gallows, or bearing bullet wounds. Other images recovered were thirty-seven black-and-white Polaroid photographs depicting women being hanged and/or mutilated, typically within Melaleuca thickets suspected to be in an undergrowth area in Davie, although the focus of these images was insufficient to permit identification of the subjects. Several other images depicted Schaefer dressed in female garments simulating his own hanging from a tree with fecal matter smeared across his buttocks. (Note: FBI profiler Roy Hazelwood would later state the images depicting Schaefer himself were taken on occasions when Schaefer "used himself as a prop [to satiate his erotic fantasies] in the absence of available female victims".)

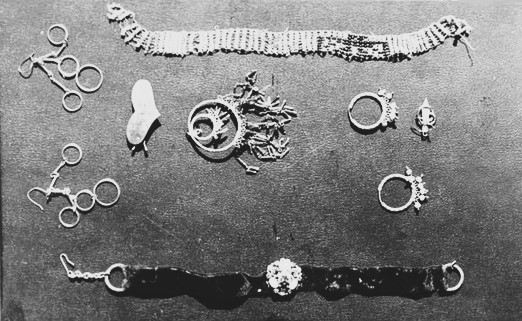
Police photograph of victims' jewelry retained by Schaefer

A letter dated July 20, 1971, from an individual in Brunswick East, Victoria, Australia, with whom Schaefer had become acquainted in Morocco in the summer of 1970, contained scores of Polaroid images this individual had taken of a "village in the Sahara" the two had encountered, following what his companion termed a "wog massacre" of both Europeans and Arabs. Several of these images depicted women who had been extensively disembowelled and otherwise mutilated with knives and axes.

Inside a gold jewelry box, investigators discovered personal possessions such as jewelry, passports and clothing belonging to several teenage girls and young women. Some of these items—such as a distinctive heart shaped charm inscribed with the initials "M.T.N."—investigators were unable to link to missing or murdered individuals; others were identified as belonging to young women who had been reported missing in recent years. One gold locket, inscribed with the name "LEIGH", was determined to belong to a missing woman named Leigh Hainline Bonadies, who had been a neighbor of Schaefer's when both were teenagers and who had been missing since September 1969; also recovered was a driver's license belonging to Barbara Ann Wilcox and a passport belonging to Collette Marie Goodenough—both of whom had been reported missing in January 1973. Furthermore, teeth and sections of bone later identified as belonging to at least eight victims were also recovered from the property.

==== Martin County ====
The April 6 search of Schaefer's Martin County residence yielded less physical evidence, although investigators did recover two human teeth stowed in a plastic capsule inside the master bedroom, (Note: These teeth were later determined to belong to a missing 22-year-old woman named Carmen Hallock.) several knives and firearms inside a utility shed, (Note: Testimony at Schaefer's trial revealed one .22 caliber pistol he is known to have possessed and which he referred to as his "Saturday-night Special" firearm was never located. Investigators believe this weapon was used in the murders of Place and Jessup.) and an extensively bloodstained white pillowcase which had evidently been washed. Jessup's distinctive suede purse was discovered to have been in the possession of Schaefer's wife; she later informed police her husband had given her the item as a gift in "about November" of the previous year, but had attempted to persuade both her and his brother-in-law, Henry Dean, to discard the item upon learning of the April 1 discoveries in Oak Hammock Park with the explanation the police may use the item to "make up some kind of evidence" against him. Despite Schaefer's efforts, his brother-in-law had given the item to police.

== Formal murder charges ==
"There has been evidence of considerable paranoid feelings, hostility, and anger, which erupts with little stress. It is noted that past examiners have [also] seen this patient as representing a character disorder ... In addition, there appears to be a very active fantasy life. He is considered to be a very dangerous person, both to himself and to others."

— Section of Dr. Benjamin R. Ogburn's pretrial evaluation of Schaefer. June 20, 1973.

By May 12, investigators had gathered enough physical and circumstantial evidence to link Schaefer to nine murders and unsolved disappearances dating between 1969 and 1973. The same month, a periodical published a list of twenty-eight murdered or missing people believed to be linked to Schaefer. The majority of these individuals hailed from Florida, although two victims each hailed from Iowa and West Virginia. At a press conference held on May 14, Chief Investigator Lem Brumley Jr. informed the media that, "in terms of scope and bizarreness", the case was the biggest he had encountered in his career to date.

On May 18, Schaefer was formally charged with first-degree murder for the killings of Place and Jessup; he was held without bond pending trial (Note: These charges were filed against Schaefer less than one month prior to his scheduled release from Martin County Jail.) and transferred to Florida State Hospital in Chattahoochee to undergo thirty days of psychiatric examinations before being returned to St. Lucie County jail on June 20. The results of these examinations revealed Schaefer to be an individual suffering from paranoia, psychosis and acute sexual deviation who viewed himself as "an eliminator of women he deemed immoral", but nonetheless mentally competent to stand trial. (Note: The evaluations of Schaefer also revealed him to be suffering from depression, in addition to possessing suicidal thoughts, which had likely increased due to his confined predicament.)

At a circuit court hearing on June 21, District Attorney Robert Stone successfully argued before Judge Cyrus Pfeiffer Trowbridge that Schaefer was sane, and thus competent to stand trial. Schaefer vehemently protested his innocence, claiming the accusations against him were "a mistake" and informing one reporter he remained confident he would be exonerated.

== Murder trial ==
Schaefer was brought to trial on September 17, 1973. He was tried in St. Lucie County before Judge Trowbridge. The prosecution team consisted of Stone and Philip Shailer, assisted by Richard Purdy and Anthony Young. Schaefer was defended by Schwartz and Bruce Colton, assisted by James Brecker.

As the murders of Place and Jessup had been committed at a time when the Supreme Court of Florida had declared capital punishment unconstitutional in the state, prosecutors sought life imprisonment for Schaefer. The defendant pleaded not guilty to the charges against him, and frequently conveyed a distant and aloof demeanor throughout the official proceedings; often staring coldly at prosecution witnesses as they testified, or turning to smile at members of the press when a witness testified for his counsel.

=== Initial proceedings ===
Although Schaefer did testify at the pretrial hearing (in which he denied any culpability in the murders of Place and Jessup and claimed to be unable to recall his whereabouts on the date of their abduction and murder), upon the advice of his defense counsel, he did not testify at the trial itself, which formally began on September 19. (Note: Schaefer's defense attorneys unsuccessfully filed several motions to suppress evidence they contended had been illegally obtained at these pretrial hearings.)

In his opening statement to the jury on September 19, Stone outlined the prosecution's contention that the physical and circumstantial evidence to be presented—in addition to various forms of testimony—would clearly illustrate Schaefer's guilt in the murders of Place and Jessup, and that the state expected the jurors to return "a verdict of guilty of murder in the first degree as to both counts". Following the conclusion of Stone's opening statement, Schwartz requested the permission of the court to reserve his opening statement until the state had rested its case. This request was granted, with no objection from the prosecution.

=== Testimony ===
==== Prosecution ====
The first witnesses to testify on behalf of the state were the two individuals who had discovered the dismembered bodies of Place and Jessup in Oak Hammock Park; both men recounted their discoveries, observations, and contacting of authorities. Their testimony was followed by that of Lieutenant Patrick Duval of the St. Lucie County Sheriff's Office, who described the crime scene, the evidence retrieved, and the grave in which the victims had been buried. Duval also testified that the lack of erosion of the grave indicated the grave had been "dug into" at least twice; he also identified several crime scene photographs.

Place's parents also took the stand on the first day of the trial to formally identify Schaefer as the man whom they had seen their daughter and Jessup in the company of prior to their disappearance. Despite efforts to discredit their identification by the defense counsel, both testified as to their certainty that Schaefer had been the individual who visited their house on the evening of their daughter's disappearance, and with whom she and her friend had left their home. Jessup's parents and younger sister, Cheryl, also formally identified the distinctive suede purse found in his wife's possession as belonging to Jessup.

Also to testify in the opening days of the trial was a clerk within a county courthouse, who revealed Schaefer's vehicle had been registered at his Martin Avenue address one month prior to the murders, thus proving the license plate Place's mother had noted indeed belonged to Schaefer. Next on the stand was Lieutenant David Yurchuk, who outlined the April 1973 search of Schaefer's mother's home and the evidence retrieved. Dr. Richard Souviron testified as to the autopsies he had conducted upon the victims, and their formal identification via dental records and distinctive healed bone fractures. Souviron withstood vigorous cross-examination from Schwartz as to the actual caliber of firearm which had inflicted the gunshot wound to Place's lower jaw, remaining adamant the bullet used to shoot Place was .22 caliber and not a .25 caliber cartridge. A Dade County medical examiner named Dr. Joseph Davis also detailed the restraining of the victims prior to their deaths, the dismemberment inflicted upon their bodies, and the numerous knife marks evident upon the victims' bones.

Nancy Trotter and Paula Wells also testified as to their abduction and narrow escape from Schaefer during the first week of the trial. Trotter also recounted to the court a statement Schaefer had made to her after she had been bound to a cypress tree: that he could dig a hole in which to bury her and Wells, and that nobody would ever find them. Their testimony was followed by a video presentation depicting the girls as they had been bound in situ at Hutchinson Island; this footage was admitted into evidence by Schwartz, who was eager to illustrate to the jury his contention there had been "no harm done" to the girls.

Among the state's evidence presented before the jury were the actual tree limbs the victims had been suspended from and which bore sections of wearing upon the tree bark, indicating both girls had remained suspended at the murder location for a period of time sufficient to create these deep markings before their deaths. Also introduced into evidence were the actual tree roots upon which Place and Jessup had been forced to balance themselves to prevent themselves from being hung prior to their torture and murder. A microanalyst named Harold Nute testified the sections of clothing fibers discovered in the root were a precise match to one of the items of clothing at the crime scene, and that hemp fibers within the sections of wearing upon the tree limbs had likely sourced from rope.

Following the entry into evidence of a manuscript penned by Schaefer in which he detailed how to "properly execute" women, Stone announced the state had presented their case. Schwartz immediately called for Schaefer's acquittal, claiming the state had not proven their case against his client and that all evidence presented was circumstantial. The court ruled against this motion.

==== Defense ====
The strategy of the defense was to discredit previous witnesses' testimony regarding the identification of Schaefer, to contend one or both decedents had been alive after September 27, 1972, and to contend the gravesite had been dug on a date after Schaefer began serving his sentence in Martin County Jail on January 15, 1973. Several of these individuals—including Schaefer's sister and wife—testified as to his physical characteristics and attire differing from those described by Place's parents. Also to testify on Schaefer's behalf was a hunting companion named Edward Harris, who stated he always carried a purse similar to that identified by Jessup's parents and sister when the two went target shooting.

One of the final witnesses to testify on behalf of the defense was a representative from the Fort Pierce City Water Plant, who testified as to the records the firm had retained of rainfall in an area close to Oak Hammock Park between September 1972 and April 1973. Upon cross-examination, this individual conceded the records presented related close to the vicinity of the crime scene, but not the vicinity of the crime scene itself.

=== Closing arguments ===
The final defense witnesses to testify delivered their testimony on September 26. The following day, both counsels delivered their closing arguments to the jury. Both counsels were granted two hours to deliver their argument. Prosecutor Philip Shailer delivered his argument first; he first referenced the fact the date of his closing argument was the first anniversary of Place and Jessup's disappearance before outlining the identification of Schaefer and his vehicle by Place's mother, the physical evidence linking the defendant to the victims, the evidence and paraphernalia recovered in the search warrants, and the similar fact evidence outlined, all collectively proving "not only beyond a reasonable doubt, but a shadow of a doubt" of Schaefer's guilt.

Referencing the similarities between the abductions of Trotter and Wells to the murders of Place and Jessup, Shailer remarked the one "glaring dissimilarity" between the two incidents was that "thank God, Wells and Trotter escaped". He finished his closing argument by referencing the Constitution; outlining the fact Schaefer had received a fair trial, with legal representation, and the burden of proof upon the prosecution to prove his guilt. Referencing Place and Jessup, Shailer stated Schaefer had shown "no presumption of innocence" for the girls, but had acted as the "prosecutor, judge and executioner" in the commission of their murders.

Schwartz attempted to discredit much of the state's evidence and witness testimony in his closing argument. He dismissed the accuracy of Lucille Place's identification of Schaefer and his vehicle before referencing speculation as to the actual date of the victims' deaths, which he suggested may have occurred after January 15, 1973, or on a date Schaefer is known to have been out of state. With regards to the personal artifacts of the decedents introduced into evidence, Schwartz inferred towards testimony from his client's family that the artifacts had actually belonged to Schaefer himself.

In reference to the grave in and around which the victims were discovered, Schwartz also alleged the grave must have been dug on a date after Schaefer's January 15 incarceration. To support this contention, Schwartz again referenced the "lack of erosion" at the burial site, despite over nineteen inches of rain having fallen in the vicinity between the date of the victims' disappearance and their discovery. Schwartz concluded his argument by contending the prosecution had not proven beyond a reasonable doubt Schaefer's guilt. Emphasizing his client's presumption of innocence, Schwartz stated in the closing stages of his argument: "Ladies and gentlemen, they have got the wrong man, and I hate to think of that, because somebody did this, but I don't believe it was Gerard John Schaefer Jr." Schwartz ended his closing argument by formally requesting the jury return a verdict of not guilty.

==== Rebuttal ====
Stone delivered his rebuttal argument on the afternoon of September 26. He began by dismissing one of Schwartz's tactics in his closing argument: the illustration of the circumstantial evidence as not being definitive proof of his client's guilt and of simply accusing him due to similar fact evidence regarding the Trotter and Wells incident. Stone then stated that the prosecution's case was constructed from both physical and circumstantial evidence—all collectively illustrating Schaefer's guilt. Referring to those who had testified, he began by defending the testimony of Lucille Place; emphasizing the crucial role in her accurate recording of Schaefer's license plate to ultimately linking him to the murders before inferring to the testimony of numerous individuals who had also testified, substantiating her identification of Schaefer and his vehicle. Stone also hearkened toward the positive identification of Jessup's purse by her mother, sister, and friend, who had each positively identified the item as belonging to Jessup, before inferring the defense witnesses who had also identified the item had lied to protect Schaefer, stating: "How many of them picked it up, looked at it? The first thing they [all] did was say, 'Yes, I recognize it. He brought it back from Morocco in 1970.'" He then referenced the testimony of Schaefer's own wife, who had stated to the court she had been given the item by her husband as a gift in November 1972, and had never seen the item prior.

When referencing the fact ballistic testing had revealed none of the firearms recovered from Schaefer's utility shed had been a match for the .22 gunshot cartridge recovered at the crime scene, Stone referenced the testimony of Schaefer's brother-in-law, who had stated Schaefer also owned a .22 pistol he termed his "Saturday-night Special", which had not been found. Holding aloft and pointing toward one of Schaefer's handwritten manuscripts introduced into evidence titled "How to Get Away with Murder", Stone stated: "I submit to you ... you will never find that Saturday-night Special, because it is in a canal with [the victims'] skulls."

In conclusion of his rebuttal argument, Stone referenced a comment his colleague had earlier made in the state's closing argument regarding Schaefer being the "prosecutor, judge and executioner" in the murders, adding "I submit to you one [more word]: God! Because he decided whether he was going to let them live or die. He became God!" Stone concluded his argument by stressing the evidence presented negated the defense contention of Schaefer's innocence before requesting a verdict of guilty.

== Conviction ==
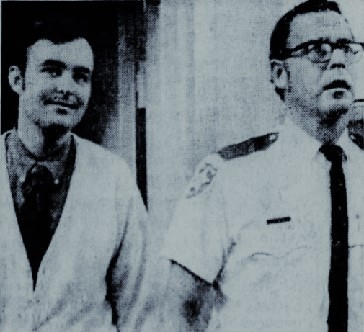
Schaefer, pictured on the date of his formal sentencing to life imprisonment for the murders of Place and Jessup on October 4, 1973

Following the closing arguments, the jury began their deliberations at 3:45 p.m. They deliberated for five hours and ten minutes before returning with two verdicts of first-degree murder, which Judge Trowbridge formally announced to the court at 11:05 p.m. Upon receipt of this verdict, Schaefer proclaimed his innocence, stating to reporters: "That's the roll of the dice. I had a good defense [but] I'm innocent."

Closing arguments to determine the sentence Schaefer should receive began on October 3, and saw the defense argue he should be involuntarily institutionalized under the 1971 Baker Act, in contrast to the prosecution's argument of life imprisonment to be served in Florida State Prison. The following day, Schaefer was sentenced to two concurrent terms of life imprisonment. When asked if he had anything to say prior to sentencing, Schaefer proclaimed his innocence before requesting he be sent to a psychiatric hospital as opposed to prison.

Place's mother expressed her satisfaction at Schaefer's sentence of life imprisonment as opposed to his receiving the death penalty, informing reporters: "At first I thought I'd like to see him dead, but I think people suffer more with confinement... death is the easy way out. Just as long as he's never on the streets again."

Contemporary statutes indicated the possibility of parole for Schaefer after he had served between fourteen and nineteen years' imprisonment, although his presumptive parole release date was revised in May 1979 to indicate the possibility of parole in the year 2016. Schaefer appealed his conviction, contending he had never been indicted by a grand jury and thus requesting a new trial. This appeal was rejected in June 1974.

== Imprisonment ==
In the years following his conviction, Schaefer maintained his innocence in the Place and Jessup murders and denied his culpability in any others; insisting he was framed by what he termed "overzealous" prosecutors, corrupt law enforcement personnel and his own defense attorney, Elton Schwartz, who ultimately married Schaefer's second wife on December 21, 1973. Although maintaining his innocence and claiming to have never met either girl, Schaefer frequently—and falsely—described Place and Jessup as heroin users, police informants, and promiscuous. He was also known to have insulted their parents.

While incarcerated, Schaefer developed a reputation among his fellow inmates as an aloof and imperious individual who many suspected of being an informant in efforts to earn privileges from authorities. In the early years of his confinement, he was placed in solitary confinement for prison mail violations on more than one occasion, occasionally for attempting to persuade members of the public to mail him female undergarments. He spent much of his time devoted to correspondence and what he termed a "new writing genre" called "killer fiction". Schaefer described this genre as one which does not glorify violence, but enables the reader to see the acts of murder and necrophilia in stark reality. Although he claimed these writings were fictional, several investigators believe many of these writings incorporate his own murders and assaults.

In 1983, Schaefer was transferred to the Avon Park Correctional Institution; here, he assisted authorities in obtaining sufficient evidence to secure the conviction of pedophile Mervyn Eric Cross, who had been discreetly operating an international softcore child pornography operation while incarcerated. The information Schaefer provided also resulted in the arrest and conviction of two people in Seattle and Los Angeles (one a schoolteacher), the seizure of thousands of indecent images of children across four states and Cross being transferred to Florida State Prison and placed in solitary confinement, with his mail closely monitored. Schaefer was himself returned to Florida State Prison in August 1985.

Schaefer also filed several frivolous lawsuits while incarcerated. One of these lawsuits was filed in 1993 against true crime writer Patrick Kendrick, who responded to a letter from Schaefer—masquerading via an outside contact as a college student—purporting to seek advice as to how to overcome his intimidation when meeting the "deadliest killer ever" who was believed to be "worse than Ted Bundy". In response to this letter, Kendrick had tersely responded there was little reason to be intimidated by Schaefer, whom he described as "a middle-aged, pale and doughy wimp, who preyed on victims that were physically and psychologically weaker than him." In response, Schaefer filed a $500,000 lawsuit which was ultimately settled out of court with prejudice. Kendrick agreed to provide Schaefer with a copy of the section of his manuscript which contained the revised list of his proposed victims, including those which Kendrick's research had revealed he could not have committed. He also sued true crime authors Sondra London, Colin Wilson, and Michael Newton and former FBI agent Robert Ressler for describing him as a serial killer in printed works.

=== Killer Fiction ===
London, who had been Schaefer's girlfriend in high school shortly prior to his 1964 graduation, interviewed Schaefer at length following his conviction; she gradually served as his co-author in his writing genre, later publishing a compilation of his short stories and drawings entitled Killer Fiction in 1990. A second book, Beyond Killer Fiction, followed two years later. The stories within Killer Fiction and Beyond Killer Fiction typically involve the savage, graphic torture, mutilation and murder of young women, usually penned from the perspective of the killer, who is often a rogue police officer.

Schaefer remained adamant the stories he authored were pure fiction and that he had actually begun writing stories of this nature in the 1960s, having been inspired to do so after watching Herschell Gordon Lewis's 1963 splatter movie Blood Feast. However, police and prosecutors viewed the content as thinly veiled descriptions of his actual crimes. In private letters to his attorneys, Schaefer admitted these speculations were true, claiming one story, "Murder Demons", specifically recounts the murders of Briscolina and Farmer.

"When I nabbed Jessup and Place, I had been in the ghoul game for almost ten years, so I knew what to expect from these juicy young creatures at the end ... Doing doubles is far more difficult than doing singles, but on the other hand it also puts one in a position to have twice as much fun. There can be some lively discussions about which of the victims will get to be killed first. When you have a pair of lively teenage bimbolinas bound hand and foot and ready for a session with the skinning knife, neither one of the little devils wants to be the one to go first, and they don't mind telling you quickly why their best friend should be the one to die."

— Letter penned by Schaefer to author Sondra London, detailing the murders of Place and Jessup, 1992.

A revised edition of Killer Fiction, published after Schaefer's death, included numerous stories and rambling articles from the first two books and a collection of letters to London, in which Schaefer claimed to be responsible for the murders of scores of women and girls. He also claimed that fellow serial killer inmate Ted Bundy, whom he labeled a "tyro" by comparison to himself, both admired and envied him; he also accused Bundy of "playing at copycat" regarding his own crimes.

London noted that at the time Schaefer was corresponding with her, he was publicly proclaiming his innocence and threatening to sue anyone who labeled him a serial killer. In one letter, Schaefer claimed to have begun murdering women in 1965, when he was aged 19; in another, he claimed to be responsible for the December 1969 disappearance of two schoolgirls, 9-year-old Peggy Rahn and 8-year-old Wendy Stevenson, whom he claimed to have kidnapped from Pompano Beach and cannibalized. Publicly, Schaefer had denied any involvement.

London ended her collaboration with Schaefer in 1991, shortly after publicly repudiating his claims that he was merely a "framed ex-cop" who wrote lurid fiction. Upon hearing that he had been publicly rebuked by London, Schaefer allegedly repeatedly threatened her life. One of the many frivolous lawsuits he filed was directed against her for publicly referring to him as a serial killer in print format. In support of London's defense against this lawsuit, she compiled an exhibit of photocopies of five hundred incriminating pages of Schaefer's handwritten correspondence. The judge immediately dismissed Schaefer's lawsuit. His aforementioned lawsuits against Newton and Wilson were likewise dismissed after London provided copies of the five-hundred page exhibit to them; his lawsuit against Kendrick was still ongoing at the time of Schaefer's 1995 murder.

== Death ==
On December 3, 1995, Schaefer was found stabbed to death on the floor of his cell. He had been stabbed over forty times around the face, head, neck and body, with his throat also being slashed, his right eye destroyed, and several ribs fractured. His body was discovered after a fellow inmate informed staff of his death.

According to prison officials and prosecutors, a 32-year-old fellow inmate named Vincent Faustino Rivera had killed Schaefer following an argument over who received the final cup of hot water from a dispenser days prior to his murder. Rivera was convicted of Schaefer's murder in 1999; he received 53 years and ten months' imprisonment added to the sentence of life plus twenty years he was already serving for a double homicide committed in Tampa in 1990. Rivera never confessed to the crime nor gave any motive for the murder. It is suspected Schaefer was killed for being a prison informant, as in the year prior to his murder other inmates had repeatedly thrown human waste at him and twice set his cell on fire. Reportedly, Schaefer's classification officer confirmed that he was murdered in a direct response to his leaking confidential information to authorities pertaining to a well-respected and powerful inmate. (Note: London has also stated she believes Schaefer was likely murdered for repeatedly informing on fellow inmates to authorities. Schaefer had previously made multiple statements to London to the effect that he used his status as a "death row law clerk" to obtain confidential information from inmates. In efforts to curry favor with authorities, he then provided this confidential information to the prosecutor's office and in return received privileges such as more comfortable living conditions. This divulged information was then used against the inmates at their trials.)

Upon hearing of Schaefer's death, the mother of victim Georgia Jessup informed the media she considered Schaefer's own murder a case of long overdue justice, stating: "I've always believed he was going to get this. I just wish it had been sooner rather than later." The judge who had presided over his murder trial, Cyrus Trowbridge, remarked: "He's finally gotten the death sentence he ultimately deserved but couldn't be given." At the time of Schaefer's death, Broward County investigators were in the process of preparing to bring further murder charges pertaining to three unsolved murders—in part to ensure he would never be freed from prison.

Sheriff Robert Crowder—who had worked alongside Schaefer for four weeks prior to his July 1972 abduction and assault of Trotter and Wells—would recollect of the case in 2009: "I think [the case] just made law enforcement more aware of the [actual] existence of serial murderers ... It made us aware of things to key on when we have a crime like this [where] there is the potential for it being one perpetrator and multiple victims." In reference to his victims, a fellow panelist at the meeting in which Crowder spoke also stated: "The [homicide] victims are not the only victims; the victims are also the families. The victims are also the law enforcement who work these cases. None of these people who worked this were ever the same."

== Alleged victims ==
There is no consensus on when or where Schaefer began killing. As Schaefer himself was killed in prison in 1995, the true number of victims he had claimed will never be known. While incarcerated, he frequently encouraged speculation as to how many victims he had claimed, (Note: On one occasion, Schaefer claimed to have killed approximately eighty victims, including individuals he had killed while traveling in Europe and Morocco in the summer of 1970. He also alleged he had actually begun killing in the mid-1960s. Nonetheless, Schaefer provided no evidence to substantiate his claims.) while simultaneously denying he had ever committed murder and claiming the numerous writings discovered at his mother's residence were purely fictional. Author Patrick Kendrick believes the most likely year Schaefer began killing is 1969, and that his true victim count stands at around eleven, although the commonly held belief is that he may have claimed up to twenty-eight victims.

The initial list of twenty-eight potential victims was first published in a Florida periodical in the spring of 1973, although this list—which also includes seven males whose personal artifacts were recovered from his mother's home—contains the names of several individuals later discovered to have still been alive at the time of his arrest, or to have died at a later date. For example, one of the young women on this compiled list, 14-year-old Katrina Marie Bivens (reported missing in January 1970) was located alive in June of the same year, whereas one of the males upon the list, Michael Angeline, died in a plane crash in 1981.

=== 1966 ===
- October 2: Nancy Elaine Leichner (21) and Pamela Ann Nater (20). Last seen alive hiking in the Alexander Springs Wilderness recreation area of the Ocala National Forest. Although authorities initially believed the two had drowned while swimming, this theory was ultimately disproven. Schaefer later confessed to their murders.

=== 1969 ===
- September 8: Leigh Farrell Hainline Bonadies (24). A newlywed waitress who had known Schaefer since both were teenagers. She is last known to have left a note to her husband of two weeks indicating she intended to drive to Miami but would return home that evening. Schaefer later claimed to a private investigator that Bonadies had phoned him on the date of her disappearance asking for a ride to Miami International Airport, but had never called him back. Her skull, bearing three bullet holes, was discovered at a construction site in Palm Beach County in April 1978.
- December 18: Carmen Marie Hallock (22). Hallock disappeared after informing her sister she had an appointment with a male teacher from Broward Community College who may be able to provide her with "a government job". She was last seen wearing a black chiffon dress; one of the stories Schaefer is known to have penned prior to his arrest recounts the hanging and mutilation of a girl with auburn hair "wearing a black chiffon dress". Two of Hallock's teeth and a gold shamrock pin belonging to her were found at Schaefer's home.

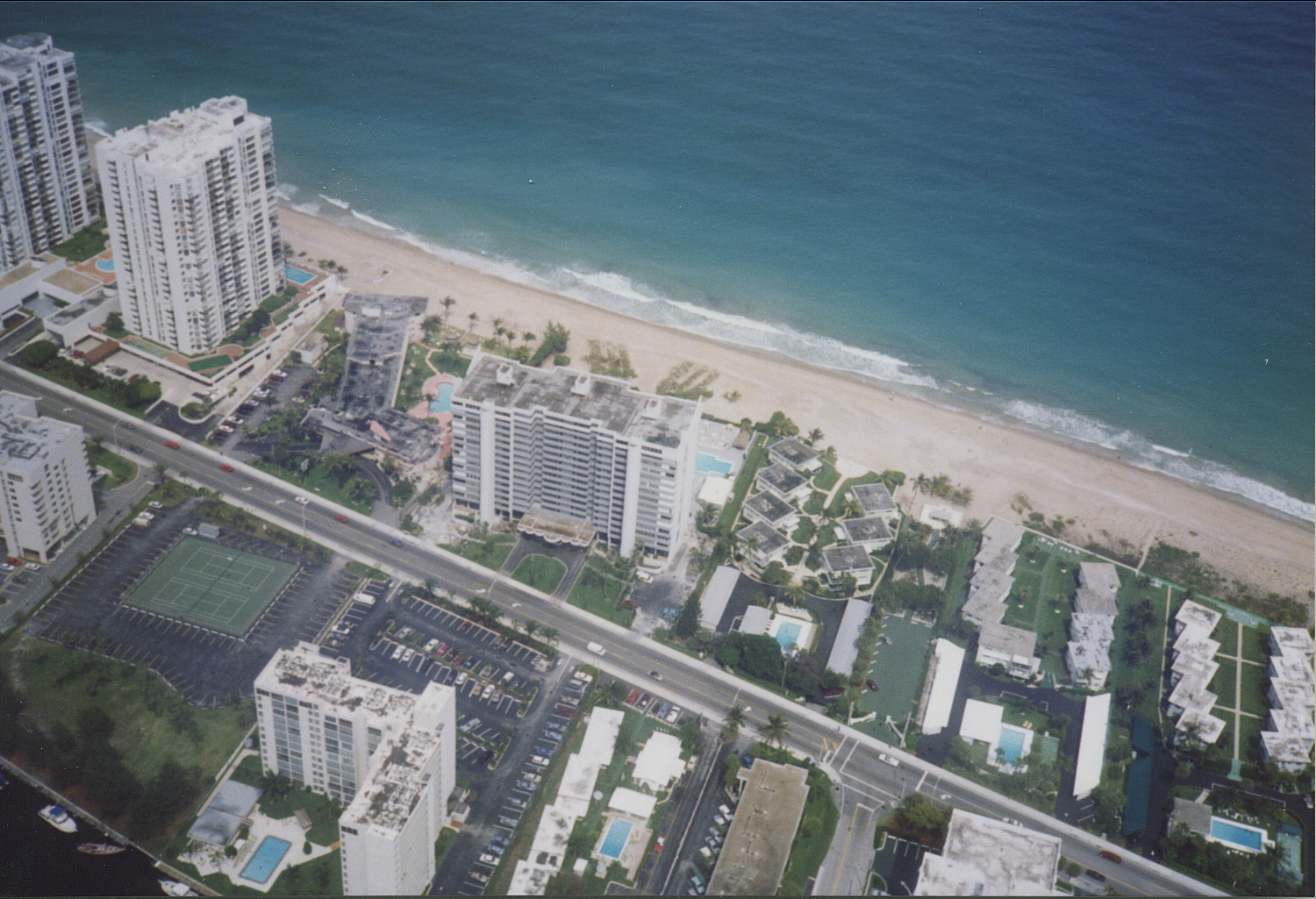
Pompano Beach. Peggy Rahn and Wendy Stevenson were last seen alive at this location on December 29, 1969.

- December 29: Peggy Rahn (9) and Wendy Stevenson (8). Last seen by relatives at Pompano Beach walking toward a parking lot to purchase ice cream cones. Their bodies have never been found. Several years after his conviction, Schaefer sent a letter to his girlfriend in which he confessed to killing the children. Several investigators dispute the authenticity of this confession, as the individual last known to have seen the girls alive had observed both girls, still clad in their bathing suits, in the company of a man whose physical description markedly contrasts with Schaefer's.

=== 1970 ===
- January 18: Mared Ellen Malarik (19) and Karen Lynn Ferrell (18). Two West Virginia University students last seen alive leaving a theater in Morgantown, West Virginia. Their decapitated bodies were discovered on April 16. An inmate with an extensive history of providing false confessions provided a 35-page confession, rife with errors, confessing to their murders in 1976, and the validity of his confession is disputed. The evidence linking Schaefer to their murders is circumstantial; he was formally cleared as a suspect in 1982.

=== 1972 ===
- January 4: Belinda Hutchens (22). A married cocktail waitress with a ten-month-old daughter, who worked as a high-class call girl, Hutchens is known to have briefly dated Schaefer shortly after his application to serve with the Wilton Manors police department. She was last seen entering a blue Datsun parked outside her home. Police later recovered an address-book identified as belonging to Hutchens and containing the name "Jerry Shepherd" from Schaefer's home.
- February 29: Debora Sue Lowe (13). Lowe was last seen walking to Rickards Middle School; her schoolbooks were later discovered in a trash bin one block from her home. Her body has never been found. Lowe's family strongly believe Schaefer, who had worked with her father and previously visited the Lowe household, was involved in her disappearance.
- March 19: Bonnie Taylor (20). Taylor was a Wilton Manors resident whom Schaefer is known to have stopped for a speeding violation shortly before her disappearance. No further information on this case exists.
- August 11: Leonard Joseph Masar (46). A coffee shop proprietor last seen alive at a Riviera Beach, Florida, bar. His handless body was discovered buried on Hutchinson Island on January 3, 1973, close to where Schaefer had bound and threatened Trotter and Wells. No direct evidence exists to indicate Schaefer's culpability in this murder, or the murder of any male. However, Schaefer is known to have referenced Masar's murder in correspondence following his murder conviction.
- c. August 31: Elizabeth Renée Wilt (22). A native of Fayetteville, Arkansas, who had traveled to Florida to attend the 1972 Republican National Convention. Her last contact with her stepmother was a letter dated August 30, postmarked Miami Beach, in which she indicated her imminent return to Arkansas. Wilt's body has never been found.

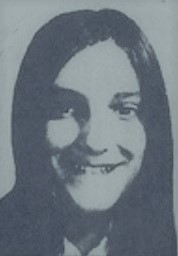
Mary Alice Briscolina

- October 26: Mary Alice Briscolina (14) and Elsie Lina Farmer (13). Disappeared while hitchhiking to a restaurant. Their decapitated bodies were found by construction workers buried 600 feet (180 m) apart on January 17 and February 15, 1973, respectively. A distinctive gold chain and Madonna medal belonging to Briscolina were later found in Schaefer's jewelry box.
- c. December 23: Suzanne Gale Poole (15). Poole was a Fort Lauderdale teenager reported missing by her family shortly before Christmas 1972. Her partial skeletal remains were discovered on June 16, 1974, bound to a mangrove tree in a swampland district of Singer Island. The remains were identified in May 2022 via genetic genealogy. The circumstances of her disappearance and murder led authorities to believe she may have been a victim of Schaefer, who had been temporarily freed from court one day before the estimated date of Poole's disappearance.

=== 1973 ===
- January 11: Collette Marie Goodenough (19) and Barbara Ann Wilcox (19). Goodenough and Wilcox were both native to Cedar Rapids, Iowa. Both disappeared while hitchhiking from Sioux City to Florida, just days before Schaefer began serving his jail sentence for the abductions of Trotter and Wells. Personal property identified as belonging to both women was later recovered from Schaefer's home. Their bound bodies were discovered along a canal bank in St. Lucie County in January 1977. Both victims were formally identified via dental records on January 8, 1978. The upper portion of Goodenough's skull was never found.

== Media ==
=== Television ===
- The crime documentary series Married with Secrets has broadcast an episode focusing upon the life and murders committed by Gerard Schaefer. This 42-minute episode was first broadcast in 2017.
- Killer Cops: Gerard Schaefer: A documentary focusing upon the murders committed by Gerard Schaefer commissioned by Sky Vision. Directed by Christopher Puttock, this documentary was initially broadcast on February 26, 2017.
- Investigation Discovery has broadcast a documentary focusing upon the crimes of Gerard Schaefer within their documentary series, Most Evil. This documentary, titled "Sexual Deviants", features footage of interviews with Schaefer.

== See also ==
- Capital punishment in Florida
- Crime in Florida
- List of serial killers by country
- List of serial killers in the United States

== Cited works and further reading ==
- Barker, Thomas (2020). Aggressors in Blue: Exposing Police Sexual Misconduct. New York City: Springer International Publishing. ISBN 978-3-030-28440-4.
- Cawthorne, Nigel; Tibballs, Geoff (1993). Killers: Contract Killers, Spree Killers, Sex Killers. The Ruthless Exponents of Murder, the Most Evil Crime of All. London: Boxtree. ISBN 0-752-20850-0.
- Cole, Catherine; Young, Cynthia (2011). True Crime: Florida: The State's Most Notorious Criminal Cases. Pennsylvania: Stackpole Books. ISBN 978-0-811-74439-3.
- Cyriax, Oliver (1993). Crime: An Encyclopedia. London: Andre Deutsh Limited. ISBN 978-0-233-98821-4.
- Douglas, John E.; Burgess, Ann W.; Burgess, Allen G.; Ressler, Robert K. (2006). Crime Classification Manual: A Standard System for Investigating and Classifying Violent Crimes. San Francisco: John Wiley & Sons Inc. ISBN 978-0-787-98501-1.
- Dunning, John (1992). Mindless Murders. Great Britain: Mulberry Editions. ISBN 1-873-12333-7.
- East, Bernard (2021). A Dramaturgical Approach to Understanding the Serial Homicides of Ted Bundy. Washington DC: Lexington Books. ISBN 978-1-793-62505-2.
- Goldman, Pearl (2016). Florida Criminal Law. Durham, North Carolina: Carolina Academic Press. ISBN 978-1-611-63816-5.
- Hazelwood, Roy; Michaud, Stephen G. (2001). Dark Dreams: A Legendary FBI Profiler Examines Homicide and the Criminal Mind. New York: St. Martin's Press. ISBN 978-1-429-98959-6.
- Hazelwood, Roy (2000). The Evil That Men Do: FBI Profiler Roy Hazelwood's Journey into the Minds of Sexual Predators. New York: St. Martin's Press. ISBN 978-0-312-97060-4.
- James, Earl (1991). Catching Serial Killers: Learning from Past Serial Murder Investigations. County Durham, England: International Forensic Services. ISBN 978-0-962-97140-2.
- Kendrick, Patrick (2020). American Ripper: The Enigma Of America's Serial Killer Cop. Florida: BluewaterPress LLC. ISBN 978-1-604-52163-4.
- Lane, Brian (1992). Real-Life Crimes. London: Eaglemoss Publications Ltd. ISBN 978-1-856-29736-3.
- Newton, Michael (2002). The Encyclopedia of Kidnappings. New York: Facts on File Inc. ISBN 978-1-438-12988-4.
- Newton, Michael (2006). The Encyclopedia of Serial Killers: A Study of the Chilling Criminal Phenomenon from the Angels of Death to the Zodiac Killer. New York: Checkmark Books. ISBN 978-0-816-06196-9.
- Newton, Michael (2016). Hangman: The Life and Crimes of Gerard John Schaefer. Toronto: R. J. Parker Publishing Inc. ISBN 978-1-987-90216-7.
- Parker, R. J. (2014). Serial Killer Groupies. Toronto: R. J. Parker Publishing Inc. ISBN 978-1-502-54090-4.
- Ressler, Robert K.; Schachtman, Tom (1992). Whoever Fights Monsters: My Twenty Years Hunting Serial Killers for the FBI. New York: St. Martin's Press. ISBN 978-0-312-30468-3.
- Rossmo, D. Kim (2000) [1999]. Geographic Profiling. Philadelphia: Taylor & Francis. ISBN 978-1-420-04878-0.
- Schaefer, Gerard J.; London, Sondra (2011). Killer Fiction. Vancouver, Washington: Feral House Publishing. ISBN 978-1-936-23919-1.
- Wilson, Colin; Seaman, Donald (1988). Encyclopedia of Modern Murder: 1962-1982. Prineville, Oregon: Bonanza Books. ISBN 978-0-517-66559-6.
- Wilson, Colin (2000). The History of Murder. London: Arcturus Publishing. ISBN 978-0-785-81835-9.
- Wilson, Colin; Wilson, Damon (2015). An End to Murder: A Criminologist's View of Violence Throughout History. New York: Skyhorse Publishing. ISBN 978-1-632-20238-3.
