= Sanderson, Florida =

- Unincorporated community
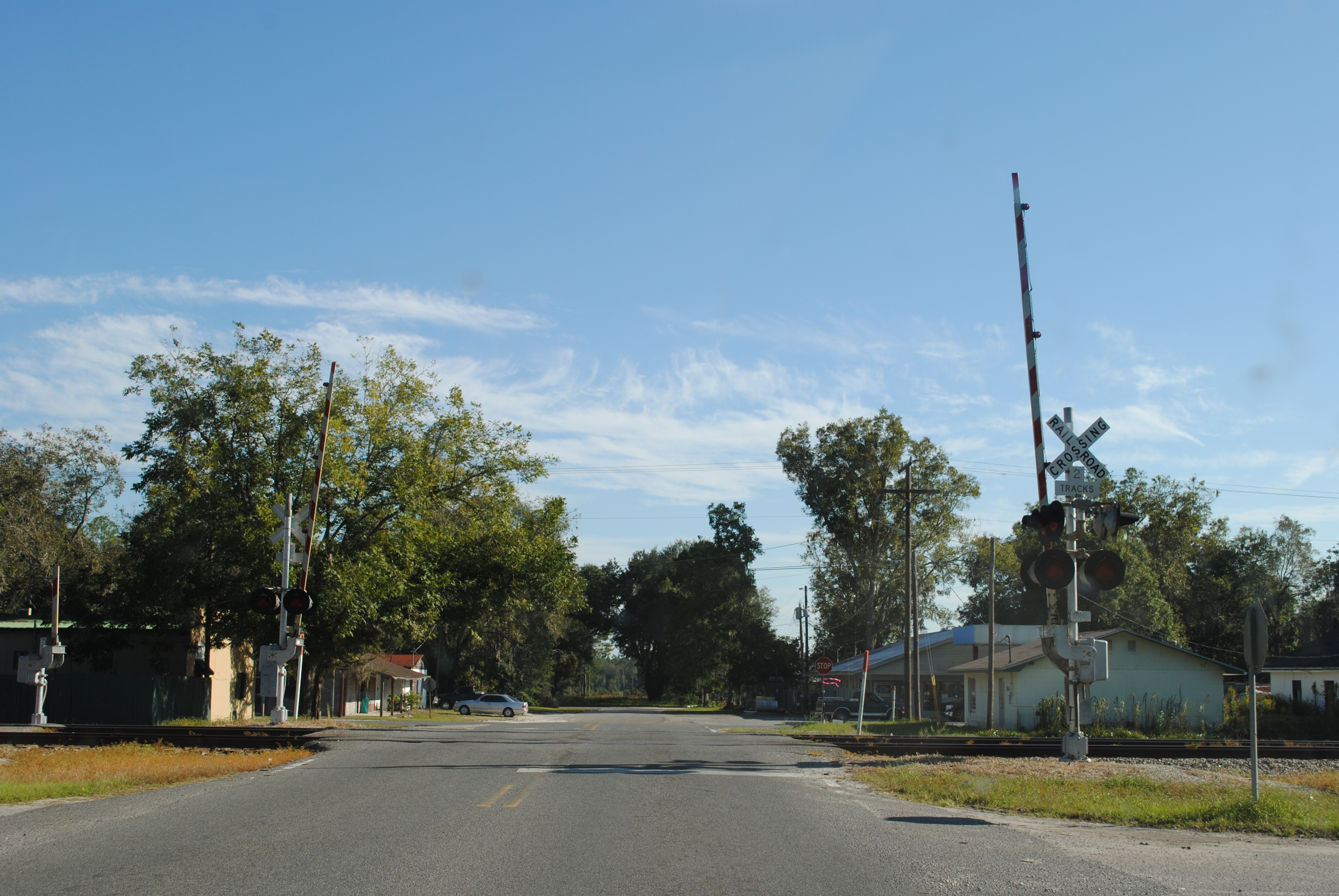
- Southbound on Baker CR 229 at the Tallahassee Subdivision Railroad Crossing.

- Location within Florida
- Coordinates: 30°15′04″N 82°16′18″W
- Country: United States
- State: Florida
- County: Baker
- Elevation: 157 ft (48 m)
- Time zone: UTC-5 (Eastern (EST))
  - Summer (DST): UTC-4 (EDT)
- ZIP code: 32087
- Area code(s): 904, 324
- GNIS feature ID: 306352

Sanderson is an unincorporated community in Baker County, Florida, United States. The main road through Sanderson is U.S. Route 90, which is intersected by County Roads 229 and 127. Sanderson is also the headquarters of the Baker County Road Department. The town was named after John Pease Sanderson.

Sanderson is located in the southeastern United States and is part of the greater Jacksonville metropolitan area. The area is known for its rural character and strong community traditions.

Sanderson is home to a medical cannabis cultivation facility, as well as several small manufacturing concerns, due to the town's easy access to I10.

The total City Population for Sanderson is about 5,518 with about 296 people per square mile.
