= San Francisco LGBT Community Center =

Coordinates: 37.77175°N 122.42405°W

SF LGBT Center
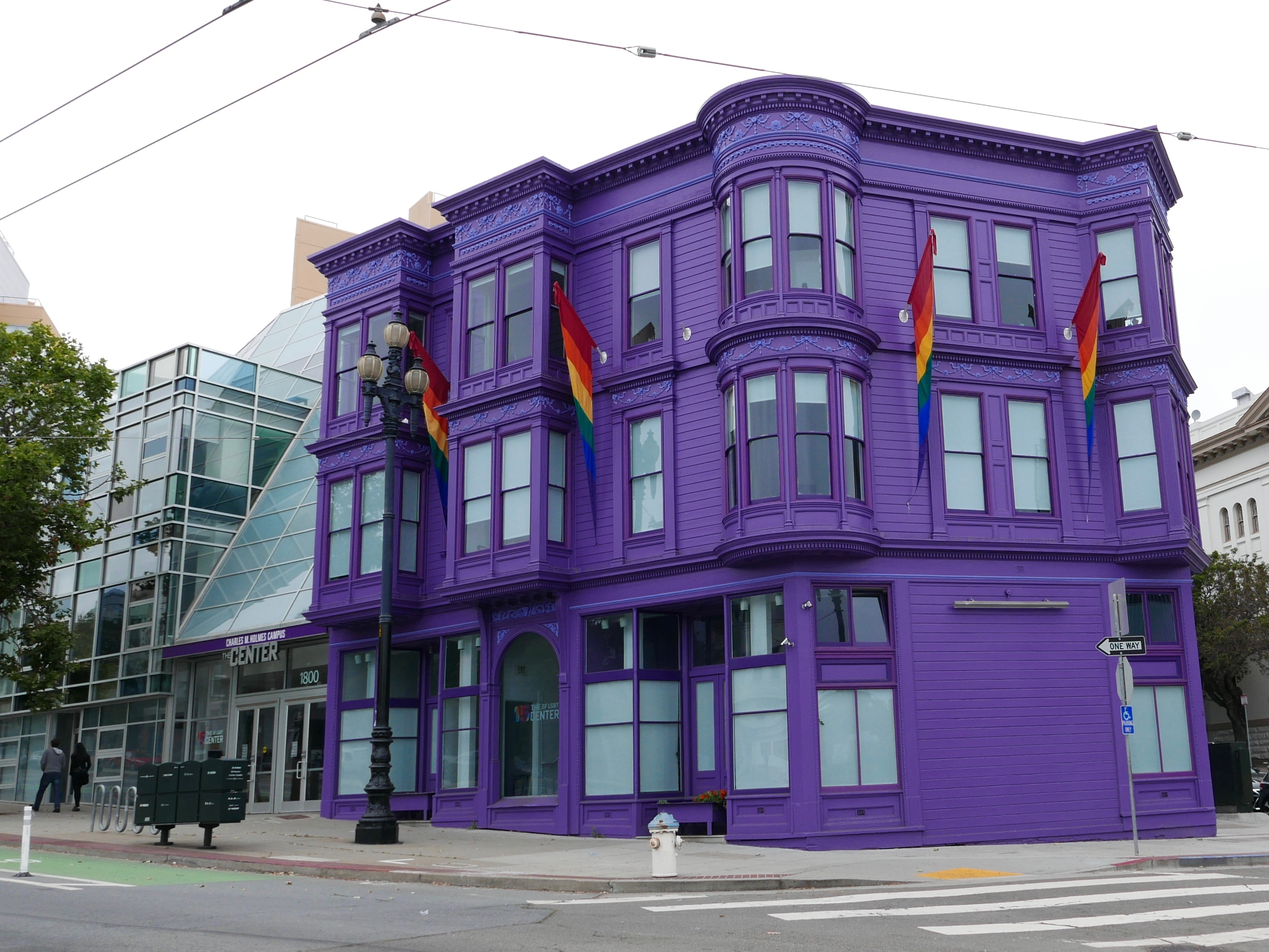

General information
- Location: 1800 Market Street; San Francisco, California; 94102
- Opened: March 2002
- Renovated: 2016
- Renovation cost: $10 million

Website
- SF LGBT Center Website

The San Francisco LGBT Community Center, also known as the SF LGBT Center, is a nonprofit organization serving the lesbian, gay, bisexual, transgender, and queer community of San Francisco, California, and nearby communities, located at 1800 Market Street in San Francisco. The mission of the SF LGBT Center is "to connect the diverse LGBTQ+ community to opportunities, resources, and each other to achieve a stronger, healthier, and more equitable world for LGBTQ+ people and our allies."

The center is housed within the designated landmark the Fallon Building, as well as having a newer portion of architecture.

== Programs and services ==
The Center's programs and services include:

- Economic Development (including housing and financial services, employment services, and small business services)
- Youth Services (including drop-in navigation, mental health services, and housing programs)
- Community Programs (including information and referral program, arts and culture program, and volunteer program)
- Building Services (including event rental space, computer lab, and partner organization tenants)

== Operations ==
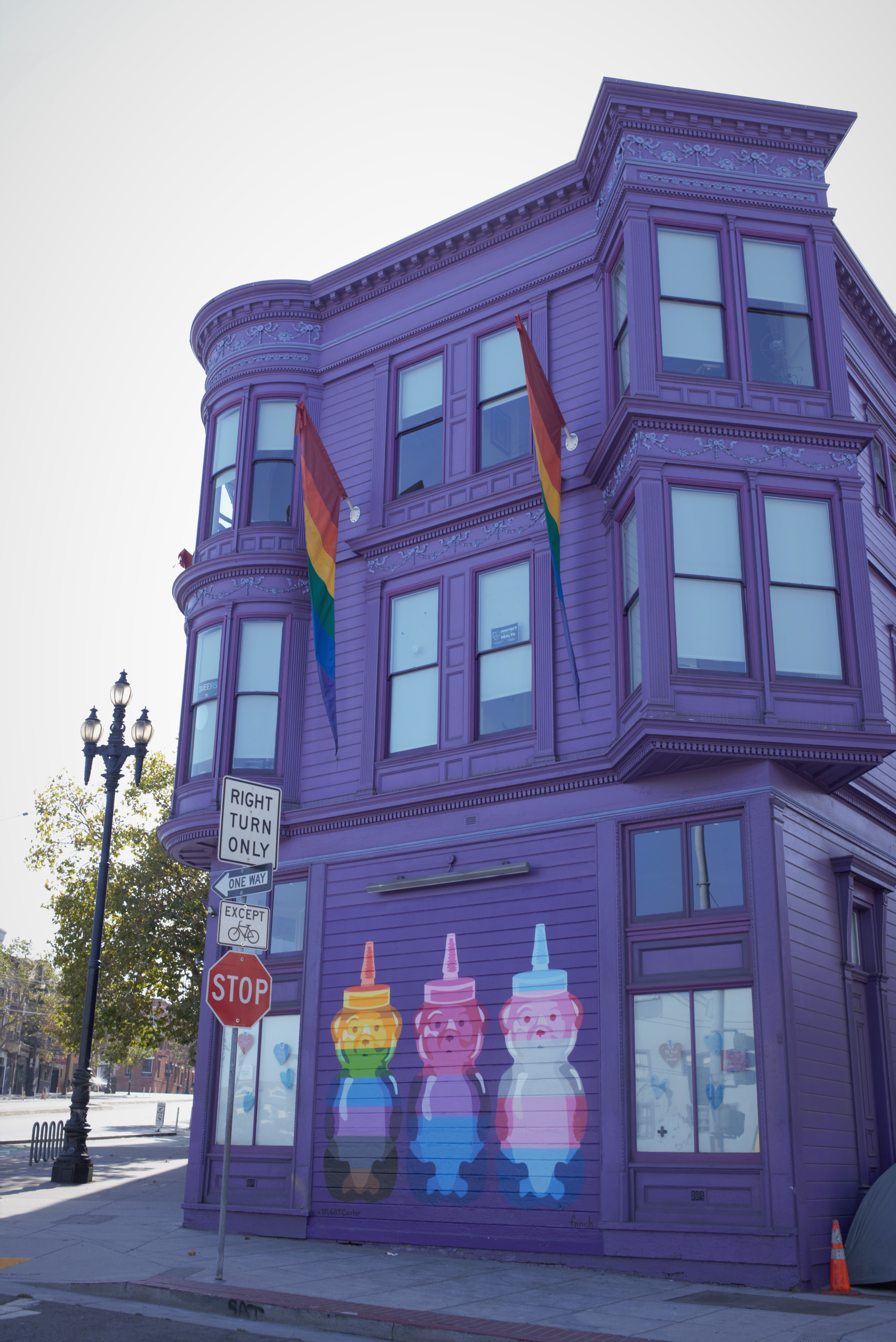
The controversial fnnch mural outside on Octavia Street (in October 2020)

As of September 2025, the agency's annual budget is approximately $6 million, supported by a combination of San Francisco city government grants, rental and event income, and institutional and individual donations. The Center's Executive Director Jennifer Valles leads a staff of about 46 staff members.

== Building ==
The center's building was created in two parts, and includes the Fallon Building (or Carmel Fallon) includes a Victorian Queen Anne home and commercial building, built in 1894 by Carmelita Lodge Fallon (1827–1923); as well as a modern portion of the building facing Market Street.

Incorporated in 1996, the Center opened its solar-powered, 35,000-square-foot (3,300 m^{2}) facility in March 2002. In 2016, the Center began a $6.5 million renovation project to expand the space available to nonprofits that lease space in the building, as well as to improve circulation in the lobby. Programs continued throughout the renovation. On April 9, 2017, the Center held a ribbon cutting ceremony and celebration to mark completion of the renovation and the 15th anniversary of the Center. The total cost of the renovation was $10 million.

== See also ==
- LGBT culture in San Francisco
- List of LGBT community centers
- List of San Francisco Designated Landmarks (see Landmark #223, Carmel Fallon Building)
