= Danny Rolling =

American serial killer (1954–2006)

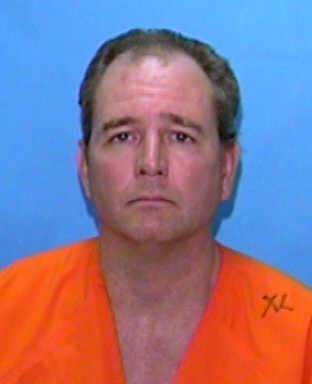
- Rolling in 1991
- Born: Daniel Harold Rolling; May 26, 1954; Shreveport, Louisiana, U.S.
- Died: October 25, 2006 (aged 52); Florida State Prison, U.S.
- Other names: The Gainesville Ripper; Michael Kennedy Jr.
- Status: Executed by lethal injection
- Motive: Hedonism; childhood abuse
- Convictions: First degree murder (5 counts); Sexual battery (3 counts); Aggravated assault (2 counts); Robbery with a deadly weapon (4 counts); Attempted robbery with a deadly weapon Burglary (5 counts); Grand theft auto Grand theft Possession of a firearm by a felon
- Penalty: Death by lethal injection x5, 10 life sentences plus 185 years

Details
- Victims: 8
- Span of crimes: 1989–1990
- Country: United States
- States: Louisiana; Florida
- Date apprehended: September 7, 1990

Daniel Harold Rolling (May 26, 1954 – October 25, 2006), known as the Gainesville Ripper, was an American spree killer who murdered five college students in Gainesville, Florida, over four days in August 1990.

Danny Rolling recorded himself playing guitar and singing acoustic songs he had written himself in a motel room in Sarasota, Florida on August 4, 1990, before committing the murders. The recording, which includes 11 demo songs, also features notes about his family and songs such as "Mystery Rider", "Broken Hearts", and "It's a Gray Way".

He later confessed to raping several of his victims, committing a triple homicide in his home city of Shreveport, Louisiana, and attempting to murder his father in May 1990. In total, Rolling confessed to killing eight people. He was sentenced to death for the five Gainesville murders in 1994. He was executed by lethal injection in 2006.

His killing spree inspired the slasher film franchise Scream.

== Early years ==
Rolling was born on May 26, 1954; one of two sons born in Shreveport, Louisiana, to James Harold Rolling (1931–2012) and Claudia Beatrice (1932–1995), who were originally from Columbus, Georgia. James was a Korean War veteran in the U.S. Navy and a Shreveport police officer. He often abused his wife and sons for frivolous things, such as breathing in a way that displeased him; he also told his son that he was unwanted from birth. In one incident, Rolling's mother went to the hospital after claiming her husband tried to make her cut herself with a razor blade. She made repeated attempts to leave her husband but always returned shortly after. James once pinned Rolling to the ground, handcuffed him, and had police take his son away because he was embarrassed by him. In another story, Rolling had a dog, but James beat the dog so often that it died in his son's arms.

As a teenager and young adult, Rolling was arrested several times for robberies in Georgia and Alabama and was caught spying on a woman getting dressed. As an adult, he had trouble trying to assimilate into society and holding down a steady job. At one point, Rolling worked as a waiter at a Pancho's restaurant in Bossier City, Louisiana.

== Gainesville murders ==
In August 1990, Rolling murdered five students (one student from Santa Fe College and four from the University of Florida) during a burglary and robbery spree in Gainesville, Florida. He mutilated his victims' bodies, decapitating one. He then posed them, sometimes using mirrors.

=== August 24, 1990 ===
In the early morning hours, Rolling broke into an apartment shared by two university freshmen, 18-year-old Sonja Larson and 17-year-old Christina Powell. Finding Powell asleep on the downstairs couch, he stood over her briefly but did not wake her up, choosing instead to go to the upstairs bedroom where Larson was also asleep. Rolling murdered Larson, first taping her mouth shut to stifle her screams, and then stabbing her to death with a Ka-Bar knife. She died trying to fend him off.

Rolling then went back downstairs, taped Powell's mouth shut, bound her wrists together behind her back and threatened her with the knife as he cut her clothes off. He then raped her and forced her face-down onto the floor, where he killed her by stabbing her five times in the back. After killing Powell, Rolling went back upstairs and raped Larson's corpse. He posed the bodies in sexually provocative positions and took a shower before leaving the apartment.

=== August 25, 1990 ===
Rolling broke into the apartment of Christa Hoyt, an 18-year-old chemistry honors student at Santa Fe College, prying open a sliding glass door with a screwdriver. Finding she was not home, he waited in the living room for her to return. Between 10:30 pm and 11:00 pm Hoyt returned home from playing racquetball and was surprised by Rolling, who placed her in a chokehold. After she had been subdued, he used duct tape to gag her mouth and bind her wrists together behind her back and led her into the bedroom, where he cut the clothes from her body and raped her. As in the Powell murder, he forced her to lie face-down onto the bed and stabbed her in the back, rupturing her aorta. He then flipped her body over and sliced her abdomen open from her pubic bone to her breastbone. After arriving back at his campsite, Rolling could not find his wallet. Thinking he may have lost it at the murder scene, he returned there, at which time he decapitated Hoyt, posed her body in a sitting position at the edge of her bed and placed her head on a shelf facing the corpse. He later claimed his intent was to add to the shock of whoever discovered her.

By this point, the murders had attracted widespread media attention. Many students had begun taking extra precautions, such as changing their daily routines and sleeping together in groups. Because the spree was happening so early in the fall semester, some students withdrew their enrollment or transferred to other schools.

=== August 27, 1990 ===
Tracy Paules, who was 23 years old, lived with her roommate Manny Taboada, also 23. Rolling broke into their apartment by prying open their sliding glass door with the same tools he used previously. Rolling found Taboada asleep in a bedroom and killed him after a struggle.

Hearing commotion, Paules went down the hall to Taboada's bedroom and saw Rolling. She attempted to barricade herself in her bedroom but Rolling broke through the door. Rolling taped her mouth and wrists, cut off her clothing, and raped her before turning her over and stabbing her three times in the back. Rolling posed Paules' body but left Taboada's in the position in which he had died.

With the exception of Taboada, all victims were petite white brunettes with brown eyes, like Rolling's mother.

Although law enforcement initially had very few leads, police identified two suspects. One suspect was Edward Lewis Humphrey, a 20-year-old University of Florida student with a history of mental illness who had been convicted of felony assault against his grandmother; he was held in custody for five months until a grand jury declined to indict him on the murder charges, citing insufficient evidence. Humphrey's photo was shown repeatedly by media outlets. Authorities publicly cleared him of all charges after Rolling's arrest; he started taking medication for his manic depression, graduated in 1994 from a local college, then worked while studying part-time, graduating magna cum laude in 2000 from University of Central Florida. The other suspect was also later cleared.

== Shreveport murders and tip about Rolling ==
Louisiana police alerted Florida authorities to an unsolved triple murder in Shreveport on November 4, 1989. Detectives noted similarities between the Gainesville murders and those of 55-year-old William Grissom, his 24-year-old daughter Julie, and his 8-year-old grandson Sean. The family was attacked in their home while preparing for dinner. Afterwards, Julie Grissom's body had been mutilated, cleaned, and posed.

Don Maines, an investigator with the Florida Department of Law Enforcement, traveled to Shreveport in November 1990 because of similarities between the two sets of murders; these included posing of the victims, tape residue on the victims' bodies, and vinegar used to cleanse the bodies. Maines said they tested the body fluids from the perpetrator in Shreveport and found that this person also had type B blood. He called the match to the evidence in Gainesville a "revelation" in the case.

Shortly after Maines' trip to Shreveport, a Shreveport resident, Cindy Juracich, called Crime Stoppers to report that Danny Rolling was possibly connected to the murders in both cities. Three months earlier, in August 1990, Juracich heard a news report about a string of murders as she traveled through the Florida Panhandle. The report made her think about Rolling, whom she met at her Louisiana hometown church, and his possible link to the murder of the Grissoms in Shreveport. Rolling had said deeply disturbing things to her and her then-husband, Steven Dobbin. "He'd come over every night for a while, and then one night, Steven came in and he goes, 'He's got to go,'" Juracich said. She also said that Dobbin told her that Rolling told him he had a problem. "I said, 'What kind of problem,'" Juracich said, "[and Steven said], 'He likes to stick knives into people.'" Juracich said she dismissed these comments because she did not want to believe Rolling could be responsible for the murders in Shreveport. Rolling had also told her, "'One day, I'm going to leave this town and I'm going to go where the girls are beautiful and I can just lay in the sun and watch beautiful women all day'".

News of the Gainesville murders haunted Juracich, so she finally contacted police in November, based on her hunch about Rolling's connection to the murders in both cities. "It would not let me rest," she said. "One day, I picked up the phone, I called Crime Stoppers, and I said, 'I think there's one guy y'all need to investigate — Danny Rolling.'"

Investigators responded to the tip and quickly found Rolling, who had been arrested on September 7, 1990, for an Ocala, Florida, supermarket robbery. The robbery was committed ten days after the bodies of Paules and Taboada were found. Rolling was being held in the Marion County Jail 40 miles south of Gainesville. Investigators determined that Rolling had type B blood, like the suspect in both the Gainesville and Shreveport murders.

Once Florida investigators realized that Rolling had multiple convictions for armed robbery, they realized he could have also been responsible for the bank robbery that occurred on the day Christa Hoyt's body was found. They returned to the evidence locker, where the gun, screwdriver, bag of money, and cassette player were stored, and listened to the tape. They also found tools matching marks left at the Gainesville murder scenes. The small camp where he had been living was in a wooded area near apartment complexes frequented by students; investigators discovered audio diaries he made there alluding to the crimes.

Later it was discovered that on August 5, 1990, Rolling broke into the home of Janet Frake in Sarasota, Florida. He bound and gagged her with duct tape while he sexually assaulted her, but did not kill her.

== Charges and trial ==
In November 1991, Rolling was charged with five counts of murder. He was brought to trial nearly four years after the murders. He claimed his motive was to become a "superstar" similar to Ted Bundy. In 1994, before his trial could get underway, Rolling unexpectedly pled guilty to all charges. Subsequently, State Attorney Rod Smith presented the penalty phase of the prosecution. During his trial, Court TV conducted an interview with Rolling's mother from her home, during which his father could be heard shouting off-camera.

While in custody, Rolling had confessed to convicted murderer and former death row inmate Robert Fieldmore Lewis, whom he'd befriended. Lewis himself was notorious for escaping from death row in 1978, the only Florida death row inmate to do so. In exchange for his testimony against Rolling, Lewis was transferred to a prison in Minnesota.

On April 20, 1994, Rolling was sentenced to death. Rolling was diagnosed with antisocial personality disorder, borderline personality disorder, and paraphilia.

== Execution ==
Shortly before he was executed in Florida for the series of killings in Gainesville, Rolling claimed responsibility for the Shreveport murders, handing his spiritual adviser Reverend Mike Hudspeth and Florida police a handwritten confession and apology. Rolling had a last meal of lobster tail. He sang a gospel hymn, but made no statement immediately before his execution, which was witnessed by many of his victims' relatives.

Rolling was executed by lethal injection at Florida State Prison on October 25, 2006, after the U.S. Supreme Court rejected a last-ditch appeal. He was pronounced dead at 6:13 pm EDT.

== In media ==
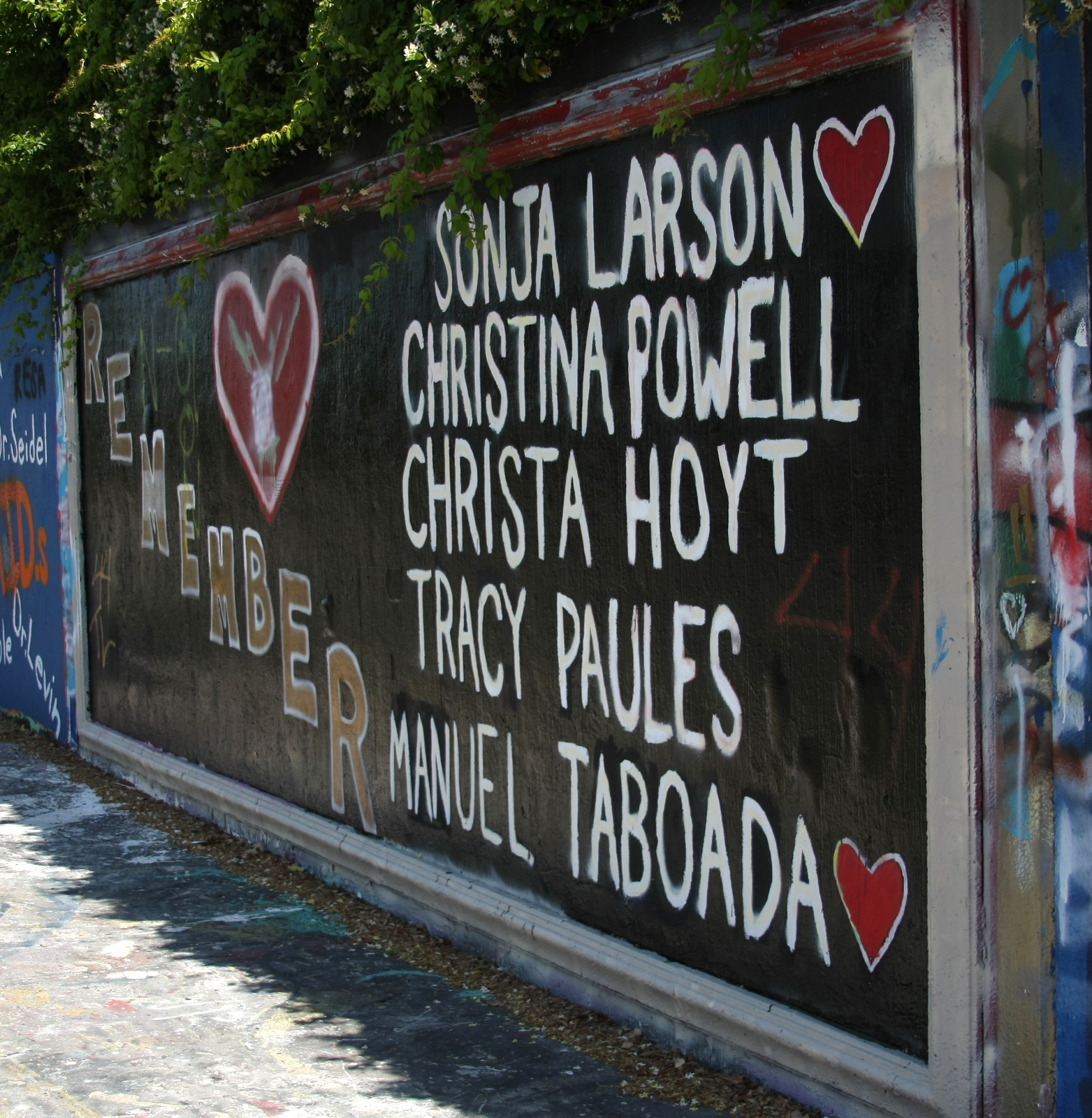
Memorial to the five students on the 34th Street Wall in Gainesville, first painted in 1990

Rolling has been the subject of several written works. His crime spree inspired screenwriter Kevin Williamson to pen the script of the 1996 slasher film Scream, which became a successful horror franchise.

Sondra London collaborated with Rolling on The Making of a Serial Killer: The True Story of the Gainesville Murders in the Killer's Own Words. Rolling's relationship with London, which developed while he was behind bars, was the focus of an episode of Errol Morris' First Person. Rolling and London became romantically involved, eventually even becoming engaged. The series overviewed their romance, his artwork, and his supposed feelings of remorse over the crimes he committed. It also included a segment of Rolling using one of his hearings as an opportunity to publicly display his affection, serenading London in the courtroom.

London, Rolling and another woman, a hairdresser named Yvette Perryman, were featured in the 1999 HBO documentary "Women Who Love Killers". The segment featured interviews with Rolling & Perryman about their current romance & the limitations of a relationship with an incarcerated partner. It also spoke to London about how she discovered Rolling had been carrying on a pen pal-type relationship with Perryman that had evolved into something more and how it had "devastated" her when she found out. She did not recommend that type of romance. Rolling & Perryman also stated that Rolling received hundreds of cards & letters every month from both women and men interested in establishing a relationship with the convicted killer.

A 2007 independent feature film titled The Gainesville Ripper, based on accounts of the killings, was shot in the Gainesville and Jacksonville, Florida areas. In the film, Rolling is portrayed by Zachary Memos.

Rolling was also the subject of an episode of Body of Evidence: From the Case Files of Dayle Hinman, a Court TV show (transmitted as Crime Scene USA: Body of Evidence on Discovery Channel in the UK) and an episode of Forensic Factor titled Killing Spree, which originally aired on Discovery Channel Canada and was rebroadcast in America on the Science Channel.

Rolling was the subject of a 2010 episode of Cold Blood.

The episode "The Gainsville Ripper" from the documentary series "FBI: Criminal Pursuit" that aired in March 2011, intricately detailed Rolling's crime spree.

He was briefly mentioned in a 2012 episode of Motives and Murders titled "Not Again". He was featured in a 2015 episode of Nightmare Next Door.

In 2013, TV documentary series The Real Story aired an episode profiling the movie Scream. It aired July 28, 2013, and tells the story of Rolling's murders in graphic detail.

An episode of Murder Made Me Famous, which aired November 24, 2018, chronicled the case.

The premiere episode of Mark of a Killer, titled "Posed to Kill", documented the case.

In 2020, WUFT News released a television special and podcast special chronicling thoughts on the case 30 years later, titled Four Days, Five Murders.

In 2021, an episode of the ABC primetime true crime television series 20/20 aired the murder case.

On January 14, 2022, Discovery+ premiered the paranormal documentary Scream: The True Story, starring Steve Shippy and Cindy Kaza. Shippy and Kaza conduct a paranormal investigation in Rolling's childhood home in Shreveport, Louisiana.

Rolling appears in an episode of The New Detectives as the 3rd case study in the episode "Tools of Death", released January 13, 1998, featuring how Rolling's screwdiver tied him to his murders.

In September 2026, ESPN aired 14 Days in Gainesville, a 30 for 30 documentary focusing on the contrast of Rolling’s 1990 murder spree occurring in Gainesville at the same time legendary University of Florida football coach Steve Spurrier was beginning his first season as coach at the university.

== See also ==
- 2022 University of Idaho killings, four university roommates killed in Idaho
- Ted Bundy, killed university sorority house roommates in Florida
- Ma Jiajue, killed four university roommates in China
- Elliot Rodger, stabbed to death roommates near university in California
- Nathaniel Code, another serial killer from Shreveport with eight victims
- List of people executed in Florida
- List of people executed in the United States in 2006
- List of serial killers in the United States

Executions carried out in Florida
Preceded by Arthur Dennis Rutherford October 18, 2006	Danny Rolling; October 25, 2006	Succeeded by Ángel Nieves Díaz December 13, 2006
Executions carried out in the United States
Preceded by Jeffrey Lundgren – Ohio October 24, 2006	Danny Rolling – Florida; October 25, 2006	Succeeded by Gregory Lynn Summers – Texas October 25, 2006
