= Jeremy Novy =

American street artist

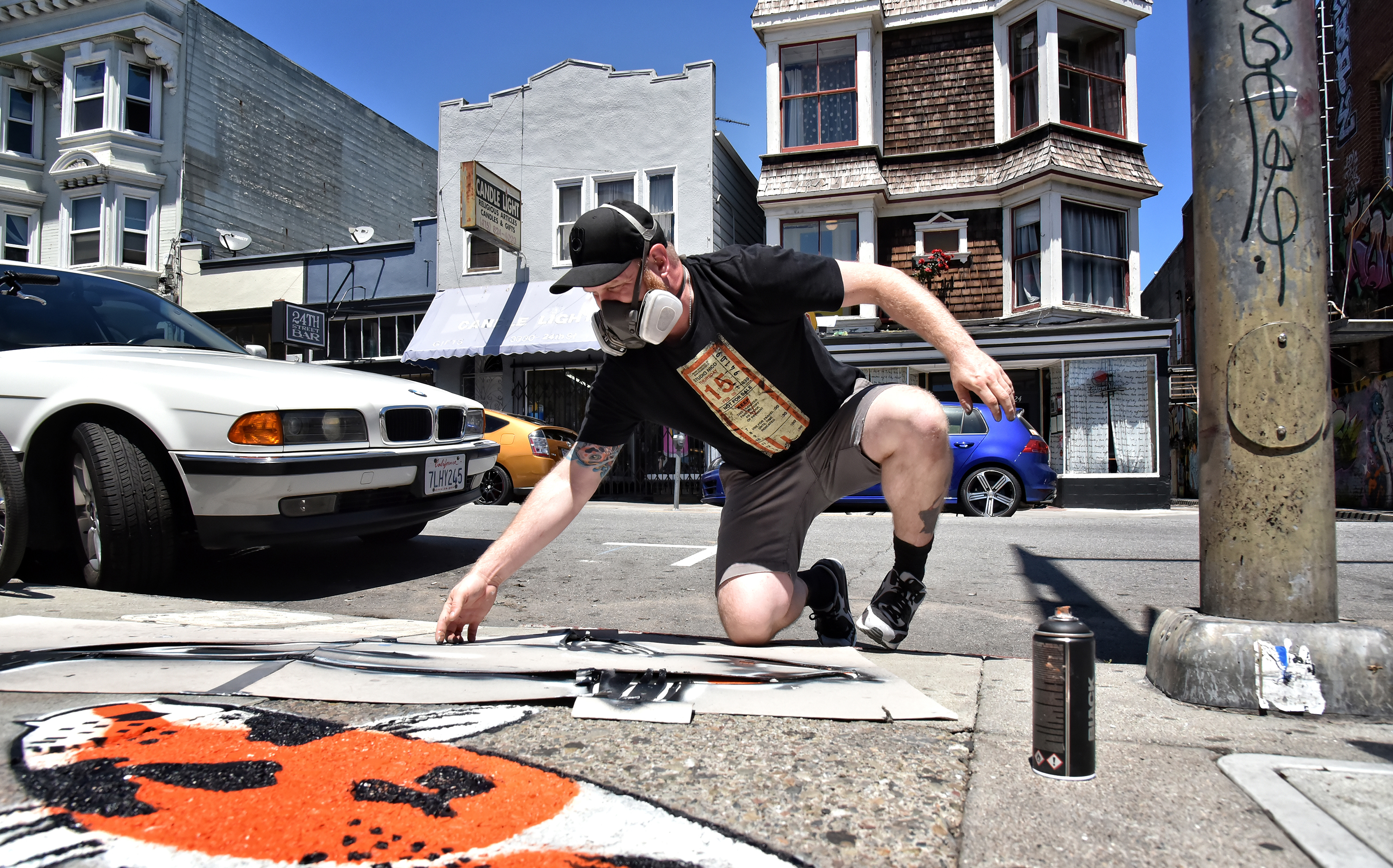
- Born: Wisconsin, U.S.
- Known for: Street art, queer art
- Movement: Contemporary art, street art, gay activism
- Website: www.jeremynovystencils.com

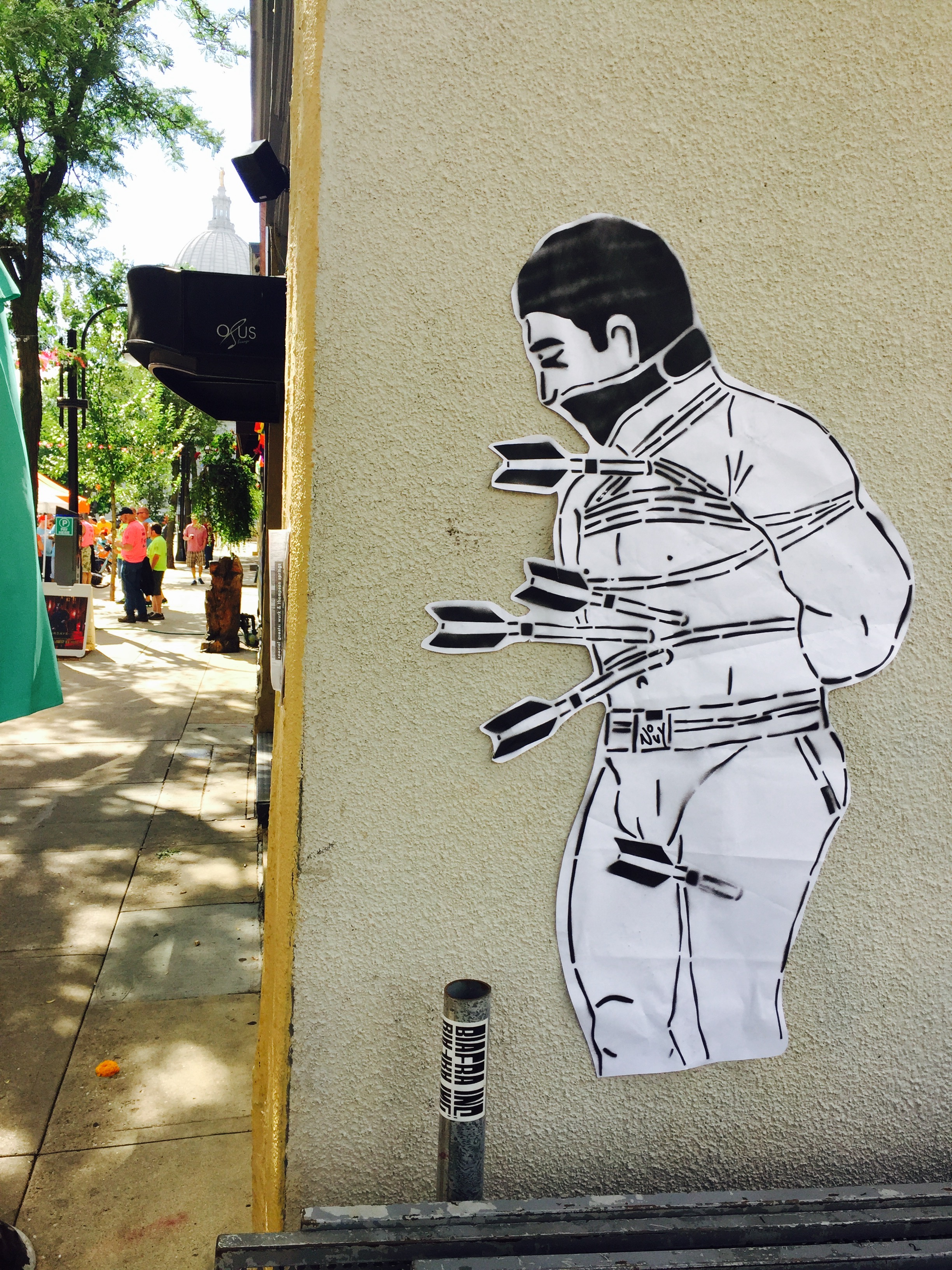
Queer St. Sebastian by Novy

Jeremy Novy is an American street artist and stencil artist. He is best known for his stencils of koi fish and efforts in support of gay activism. His work has been featured in numerous publications, including SF Weekly, the Wisconsin Gazette and Missionlocal.org. In 2008, Novy was the recipient of the prestigious National Endowment for the Arts grant. Novy is California-based.

== Early history ==
Novy earned an associate degree in graphic design from Gateway Technical College in Elkhorn, Wisconsin in 2004. In 2008, he earned his Bachelor of Fine Arts in photography from University of Wisconsin–Milwaukee then relocated to San Francisco that same year.

== Street art ==
Novy first became interested to putting stencils and wheatpastes on the streets to make his art accessible to every viewer, not just the wealthy, well educated patron of expensive galleries. In addition to democratizing art, Novy's mission is to create work that beautifies the city but also work that explores social and political themes.

=== Koi fish ===
In 2006, Novy spent time traveling through China studying ancient and contemporary art. From his background in graphic design, Novy understood how effective subliminal branding could be and seeing those subliminal messages in political posters throughout China sparked his activism. These posters supported a communist agenda that told people how to think, giving Novy the idea to create street art to encourage viewers to think differently. At the same time he found these communist posters, Novy also learned more about Chinese scrolls, specifically the hidden messages and iconography within the image of the koi fish. The koi symbolize several lessons and trials people often encounter in life and, as koi are able to swim against the current and travel upstream, represent resilience. Furthermore, the number of koi communicates a unique message that corresponds to the meaning of that lucky number in Chinese lore. Novy was inspired by the image and symbolism behind the fish and began stenciling images of it on sidewalks in 2006.

=== Queer art ===
Novy is one of the few street artists in the United States who openly identifies as being gay. Through his stencils, specifically ones of drag queens, queer CareBears and shirtless men, he is able to make important political and social commentary regarding LGBT rights. Novy generates gay imagery in response to what he says is a predominately male and heterosexual street art community and to promote awareness and acceptance of art regardless of the sexual orientation of its creator. Novy combats this homophobic lack of representation by celebrating gay iconography, ultimately encouraging tolerance and investment in community and urban spaces.

== National Endowment for the Arts ==
In 2008, Novy received a grant from the National Endowment for the Arts. With the funds, he curated an exhibition, “A History of Queer Street Art,” which premiered in San Francisco, and later toured to Pop Up Gallery in Los Angeles, and Yale University.
