= Street art in the San Francisco Bay Area =

At Lands End park

Many building owners in San Francisco invite artists to paint on them, but disallow common graffiti.

Street Art has been a major part of the San Francisco Bay Area's culture since the early 1980s. As the years went on, street art and graffiti became more and more prevalent in the Bay Area. In some areas of San Francisco, this art is done with the permission of the wall owners, though the majority is done illegally.

The San Francisco Bay Area has a large street art scene. Areas such as the Mission District of San Francisco have developed a wide public fan base because of its large murals. This area of San Francisco is home to one of the most famous pieces of street art, the Women's Building mural. This mural is known for how representative of all different women it is. It contains many different famous women as well as women of color. Murals such as this exist all over the Bay Area, along with simple graffiti which is less approved of by the public. Many famous Bay Area artists are well known for their work here.

Street art is controversial in the Bay Area and is seen as a nuisance by many residents. Street art in San Francisco is considered controversial because it vandalizes public spaces, while also providing art that people like to look at. On one hand the art that created vandalizes public property but on the other hand it is creating something for tourists and people in general to look at in their daily lives. Another main controversy is that most street artists do not get the punishment that is stated in California law for vandalizing public property. Street art is illegal and the law enforcement agency in this area has been strictly implementing laws against street art to prevent further damage to city property.

== History ==
The Alcatraz Water Tower is painted with a recreation of graffiti from the Occupation of Alcatraz

Graffiti began in the Bay Area around the early 1980s. It began as a means of expression for young children in this area. This changed when paint became illegal for anyone under 18 to buy. People began to get into street art later in life and art became more developed. Early graffiti was generally neighborhood or gang related. Around the mid-1980s, graffiti became focused mainly on tagging. The Hip Hop movement further developed the street art culture as well. Eventually individual graffiti artists got together and formed separate crews. Around the time that crews began to form street art developed dramatically. The art went from simple name scribbles to bigger, more colorful pieces. Street art from here on out slowly developed through different movements in this area. Separations between different graffiti crews caused people to create new forms of graffiti. There are many places in the Bay Area that were designated as very big places for artists to showcase their work.

Mission School was a graffiti movement started by San Francisco art students in the 1990s. The Mission District in San Francisco has since developed into one of the most well known places for street art. The art in this area developed simple graffiti into more accepted and appreciated art.

A major work in the Mission District is the mural on the Women's Building. This is a central piece of the area and attracts many tourists. The mural captures much of San Francisco's ideals, with the different women painted on the building and the diversity it represents. The mural was painted by a group of women, including a few former members of the all-female muralist group, the Mujeres Muralistas. The Mission District is home to many different alleys and walls of murals. The street art in this area tends to be bigger pictures rather than small tags and is more widely accepted because of the visual appeal of the pieces.

== Public opinion ==
Although street art is illegal, it covers the streets of the Bay Area. People are very accepting of it, because they are so exposed to it. There are many ways that people have tried to get rid of graffiti here but in the end it seems as though it is not leaving. Places such as the Mission District of San Francisco have public ratings on how much the public enjoy the graffiti here. Many tourist spots in the city are graffiti centered areas where people take pictures by these pieces of street art. The acceptability of street art varies throughout the Bay Area. In bigger cities such as San Francisco, Oakland, and Berkeley it is more widely accepted than the smaller suburbs of the Bay Area. Street art in this area is used mainly as a form of communication between the kinds of people creating this art. Therefore, it is more accepted where these people are present.

== Artists ==
One of the most well known Bay Area street artists is Riff. In the early 1980s Riff began tagging, causing more and more people to tag in the Bay Area. TMF is one of the best-known crews from the Bay Area. Their focus was to develop from the tag to a fuller piece of art. They used more color than any artist had before them. Their graffiti began a separation in graffiti art. TWS began the new San Francisco art scene. A little bit after TWS and TMF began their separate styles an artist named DREAM came along. DREAM created art that made people think about their styles and he died in the middle of his fame and from this so many people were inspired to create pieces to commemorate him. These pieces challenged the graffiti style at that time and furthered the works of many people. Graffiti was about "leaving tags on the blank canvas of a building was a way to mark territory in a city where he often felt marginalized" to these artists. It was more important than just putting their name on the wall to these artists but rather a way to feel accepted somewhere they often felt like they weren't.

=== Issues between artists ===
Early in Bay Area Graffiti there were problems that arose between two major graffiti art crews, TWS and TMF, who had different styles. Since the styles of the groups were so different people chose one or other to support, and as soon as one put up a new piece the supporters of the other crew would cover it with simple tags. For a while the division occurred before artists like DREAM brought them back together. DREAM made art that unified all street artists and eased disputes such as that between TWS and TMF. The Graffiti war in the Bay Area is between taggers and picture artists. Taggers are covering more modern art pieces on the streets and creating a war between these two groups. Street artists have been attacking the pieces of artists who put up their art with the permission of the city.

== Legality ==
Painting on any public property in California is punishable by up to a year in prison, along with a five thousand dollar fine. Until recently artists would get away with less punishment than the law allowed, but the San Francisco Police Department has been active in catching people who paint on walls without permission and giving them severe punishments. On average graffiti clean up costs 20 million dollars a year. This is paid for by private businesses as well as the local government. In 2013, two major graffiti artists in the Bay Area were caught painting the Hibernia Bank in San Francisco and given an 8,000 dollar fine as well as being banned from owning etching markers and spray paint. This case created a movement to arrest more and more street artists in this area. Police are now inputting graffiti into a system that will compile graffiti and help catch repeat offenders. These new forms of regulating graffiti will reduce the amount of graffiti in this area and catch the artists making these works. The plan of the new laws are to implement these punishments without any exceptions.
