= National Register of Historic Places listings in Baker County, Florida =

Location of Baker County in Florida

This is a list of the National Register of Historic Places listings in Baker County, Florida.

This is intended to be a complete list of the properties and districts on the National Register of Historic Places in Baker County, Florida, United States. The locations of National Register properties and districts for which the latitude and longitude coordinates are included below, may be seen in a map.

There are 4 properties and districts listed on the National Register in the county.

This National Park Service list is complete through NPS recent listings posted March 21, 2025.

Contents: Counties in Florida (non-linked contain no National Register listings)
Alachua - Baker - Bay - Bradford - Brevard - Broward - Calhoun - Charlotte - Citrus - Clay - Collier - Columbia - DeSoto - Dixie - Duval - Escambia - Flagler - Franklin - Gadsden - Gilchrist - Glades - Gulf - Hamilton - Hardee - Hendry - Hernando - Highlands - Hillsborough (Tampa) - Holmes - Indian River - Jackson - Jefferson - Lafayette - Lake - Lee - Leon - Levy - Liberty - Madison - Manatee - Marion - Martin - Miami-Dade (Miami) - Monroe - Nassau - Okaloosa - Okeechobee - Orange - Osceola - Palm Beach - Pasco - Pinellas - Polk - Putnam - St. Johns - St. Lucie - Santa Rosa - Sarasota - Seminole - Sumter - Suwannee - Taylor - Union - Volusia - Wakulla - Walton - Washington

== Current listings ==
	Name on the Register	Image	Date listed	Location	City or town	Description
1	Burnsed Blockhouse	Burnsed Blockhouse	May 7, 1973 (#73000567)	North of Sanderson off Jacksonville Road; 30°26′06″N 82°12′45″W	Sanderson	Moved from Sanderson to Heritage Park in Macclenny
2	Glen Saint Mary Nurseries Company	Glen Saint Mary Nurseries Company	November 7, 2003 (#03001111)	7703 Glen Nursery Road; 30°15′12″N 82°10′31″W	Glen St. Mary	
3	Old Baker County Courthouse	Old Baker County Courthouse	August 21, 1986 (#86001729)	14 West McIver Street; 30°16′48″N 82°07′20″W	Macclenny	
4	Olustee Battlefield	Olustee Battlefield	August 12, 1970 (#70000177)	2 miles east of Olustee on U.S. Route 90 in the Osceola National Forest; 30°12′46″N 82°23′21″W	Olustee	

== See also ==
- List of National Historic Landmarks in Florida
- National Register of Historic Places listings in Florida
