= Big Gum Swamp Wilderness =

Protected area in Florida, United States

- IUCN category Ib (wilderness area)
- Location within Florida Location within the United States
- Location: Baker / Columbia counties, Florida, USA
- Nearest city: Lake City, Florida
- Coordinates: 30°20′29″N 82°26′27″W
- Area: 13,660 acres (55 km^{2})
- Established: September 28, 1984
- Governing body: U.S. Forest Service

The Big Gum Swamp Wilderness is located in the Osceola National Forest, northeast of Lake City, Florida. The 13,660-acre (55 km^{2}) refuge was established on September 28, 1984.
