= Edward Columbus Hosford =

American architect

- Born: April 24, 1883; Eastman, Georgia, United States
- Died: January 2, 1939 (aged 55); Eastman, Georgia
- Occupation: Architect

Edward Columbus Hosford, also known as Edward C. Hosford and E. C. Hosford, (April 24, 1883 – January 2, 1939) was an American architect noted for the courthouses and other buildings that he designed in Florida, Georgia and Texas.

== Early life ==
Edward Columbus Hosford was born in Eastman, Georgia, the son of Christopher Columbus Hosford and his wife, Hattie B. Pipkin Hosford. Little is known of his early life and education. His Dodge County draft registration card in 1918 shows that he was a "draftsman & estimator" for "Hugger Bros." [Construction Company] of Brunswick, Georgia.

== Marriage and family ==
Edward Columbus Hosford married Alice Mae Baker. Their children included: Evelyn Elvira Hosford (1911-1925) and Mildred Elizabeth (Hosford) Dumich (1915-1989).

== County courthouses ==
Edward Columbus Hosford designed many county courthouses, including the following:

=== Florida ===
Image	Building Name	Location	Built	Comments
	Old Baker County Courthouse	Macclenny	1909	
	Glades County Courthouse	Moore Haven	1928	Moore Haven Residential Historic District
	Old Hendry County Courthouse	LaBelle	1926	
	Jefferson County Courthouse	Monticello	1909	Monticello Historic District
	Lafayette County Courthouse	Mayo	1909	
	Pasco County Courthouse	Dade City	1909	Downtown Dade City
	Old Polk County Courthouse	Bartow	1909	

=== Georgia ===
Image	Building Name	Location	Built	Comments
	Bulloch County Courthouse	Statesboro	1914	major renovations.
	Dodge County Courthouse	Eastman	1908	Hosford's first courthouse
	Harris County Courthouse	Hamilton	1908	Hosford's second courthouse

=== Texas ===
Image	Building Name	Location	Built	Comments
	Glasscock County Courthouse	Garden City	1909	
	Mason County Courthouse	Mason	1909	Mason Historic District

== Other buildings ==
Other buildings designed by Hosford include:

Image	Building Name	Location	Built	Comments
	Belleview School	5343 Southeast Abshier Boulevard., Belleview, Florida	1928	
	Emory Bryant House	101 Lake Wire Drive, Lakeland, Florida	ca. 1923	
	Building at 106-114 East Main Street	106-114 East Main Street, Lakeland, Florida	ca. 1925	
	Donehoo-Brannen House	Statesboro, Georgia	1917	
	House at 401 West Peachtree Street	401 West Peachtree Street, Lakeland, Florida	ca. 1925	
	LaBelle High School	150 Curry Street, LaBelle, Florida	1926	
	Oates Building	230 South Florida Avenue, Lakeland, Florida	ca. 1925	
	Old Central Grammar School	801 Ledwith Avenue, Haines City, Florida	1925	
	Old Lakeland High School	400 North Florida Avenue, Lakeland, Florida	ca. 1926	
	Peabody School	Herman Avenue, Eastman, Georgia	1938	
