= Belleview School =

- U.S. National Register of Historic Places
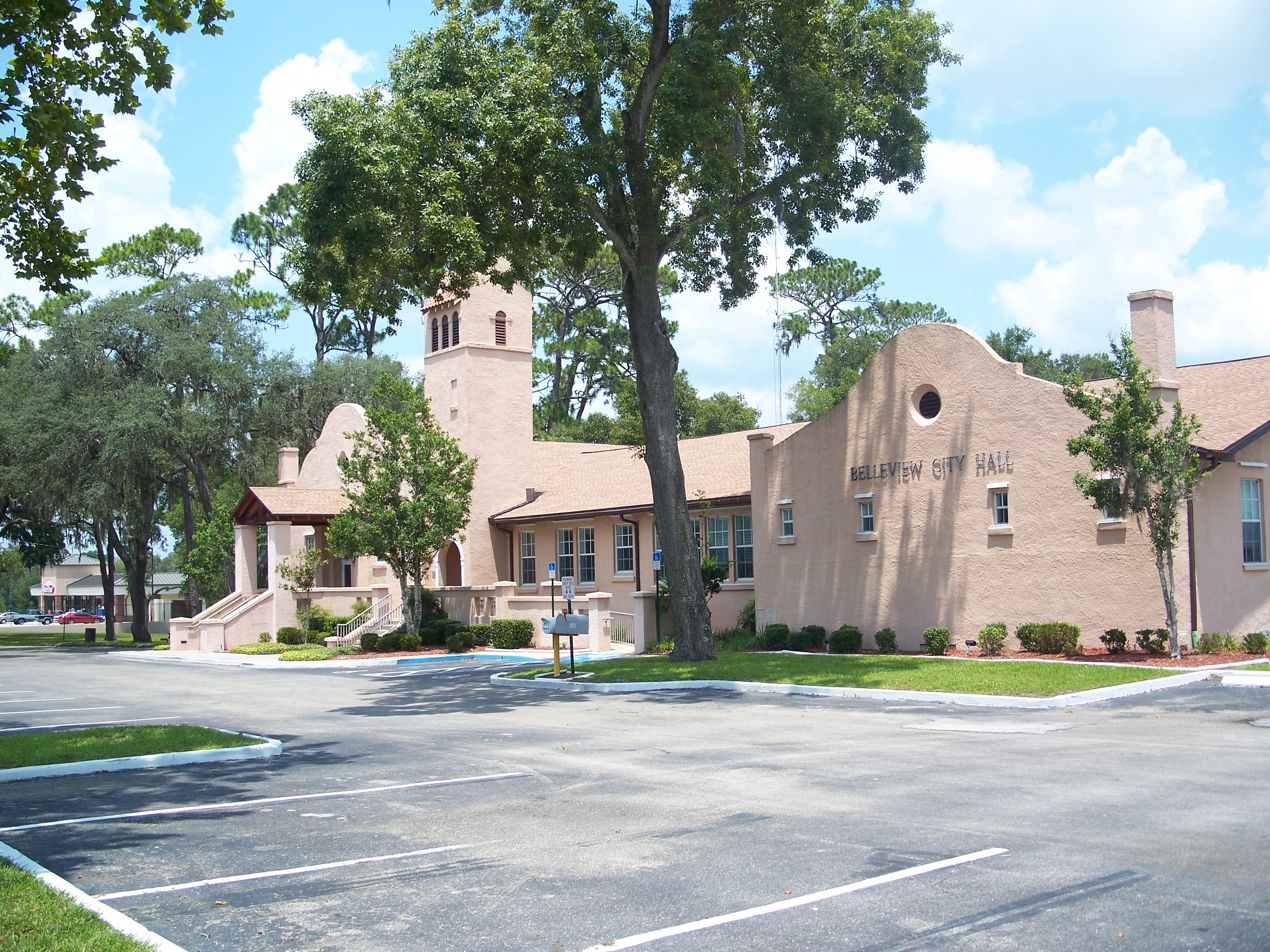
- Belleview School / City Hall

- Location within Florida Location within the United States
- Location: Belleview, Florida
- Coordinates: 29°3′37″N 82°3′35″W
- Built: 1928
- Architect: Edward Columbus Hosford; Alfred W. Smith, builder
- Architectural style: Mission Revival
- NRHP reference No.: 99000372
- Added to NRHP: March 25, 1999

The Belleview School (also known as Belleview City Hall) is a historic building in Belleview, Florida, United States. Built in 1928, it was designed by architect Edward Columbus Hosford in the Mission Revival style.

The Belleview School is located at 5343 Southeast Abshier Boulevard. On March 25, 1999, it was added to the U.S. National Register of Historic Places.
