= Old Lakeland High School =

- U.S. National Register of Historic Places
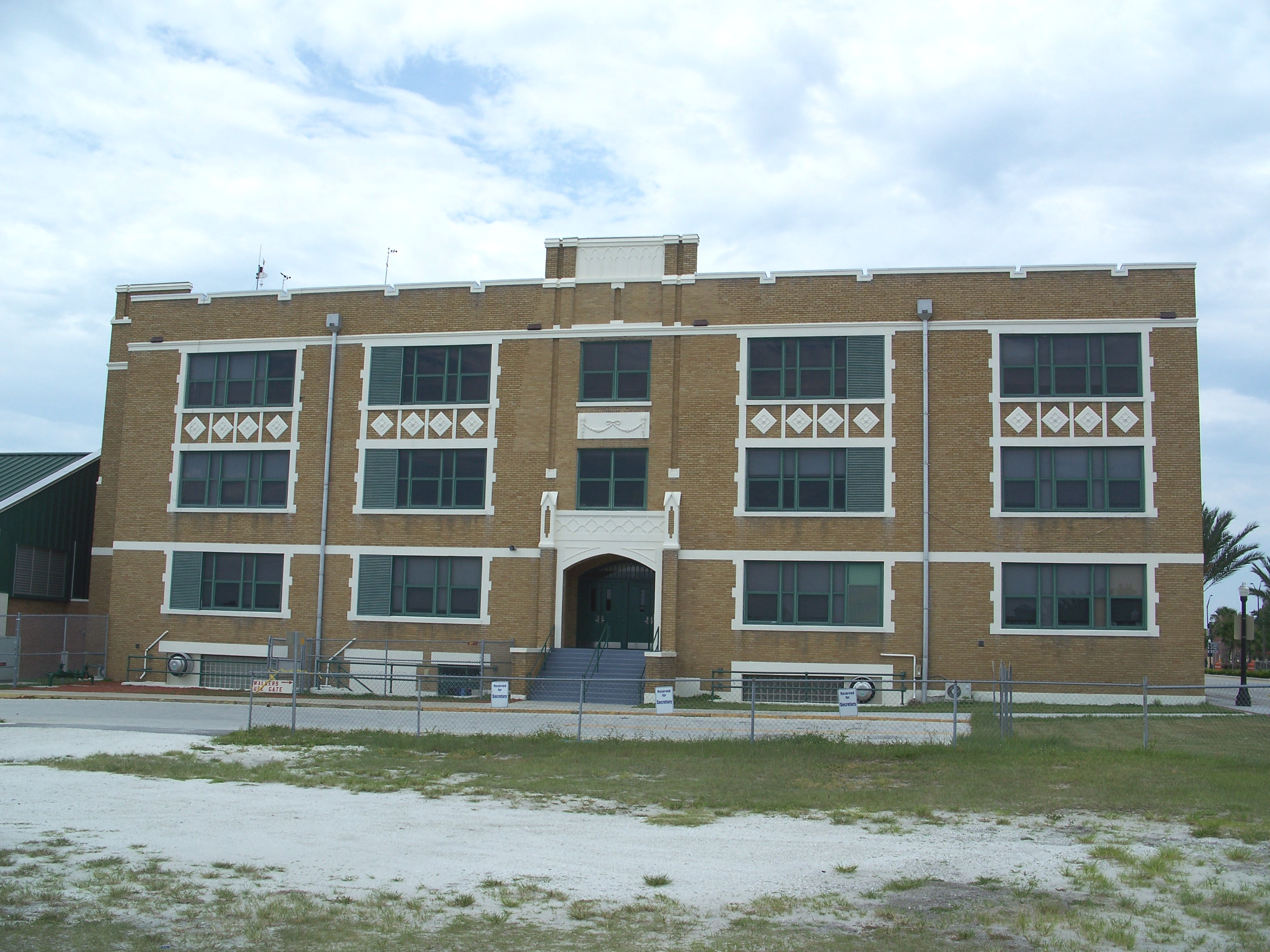
- South side of building

- Location within Florida Location within the United States
- Location: Lakeland, Florida
- Coordinates: 28°02′54″N 81°57′28″W
- Built: 1926
- Architect: Edward Columbus Hosford
- Architectural style: Late Gothic Revival
- NRHP reference No.: 93001027
- Added to NRHP: September 30, 1993

The Old Lakeland High School, also formerly known as the Polk Opportunity Center, is an historic 3-story redbrick school building located at 400 North Florida Avenue in Lakeland, Florida, U.S.. Built in 1926, it was designed by architect Edward Columbus Hosford in the late Gothic Revival architectural style.

On September 30, 1993, it was added to the National Register of Historic Places. Over the years the building has housed several different schools including the Polk Opportunity Center, Lakeland Junior High School, and Lakeland Middle Academy. Lakeland Middle Academy was renamed Lawton Chiles Middle Academy in 1999, to honor the passing of former Florida governor Lawton Chiles—himself an alumnus of Lakeland High School.

== See also ==
- Lakeland High School

== Gallery ==
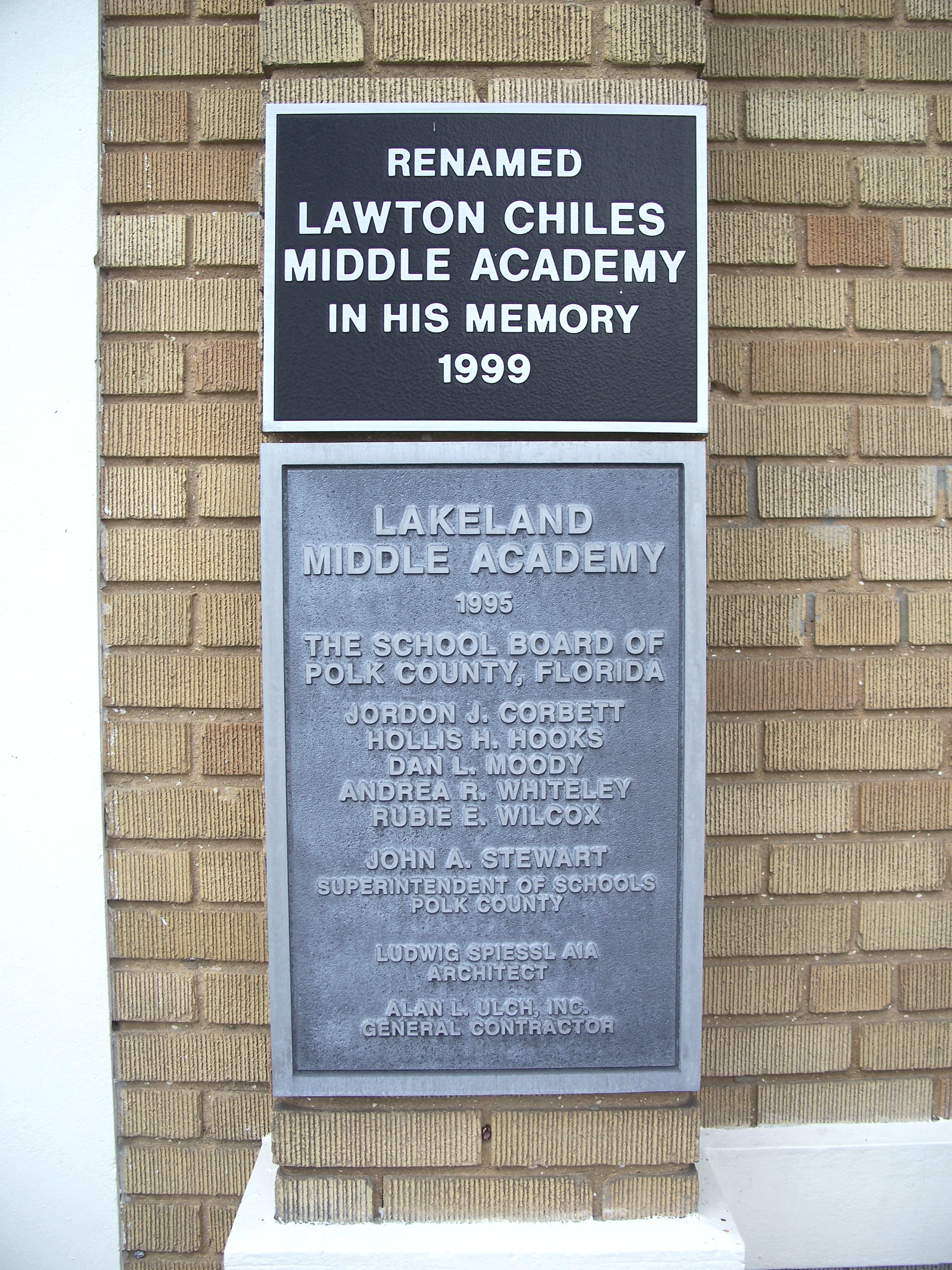
Plaques

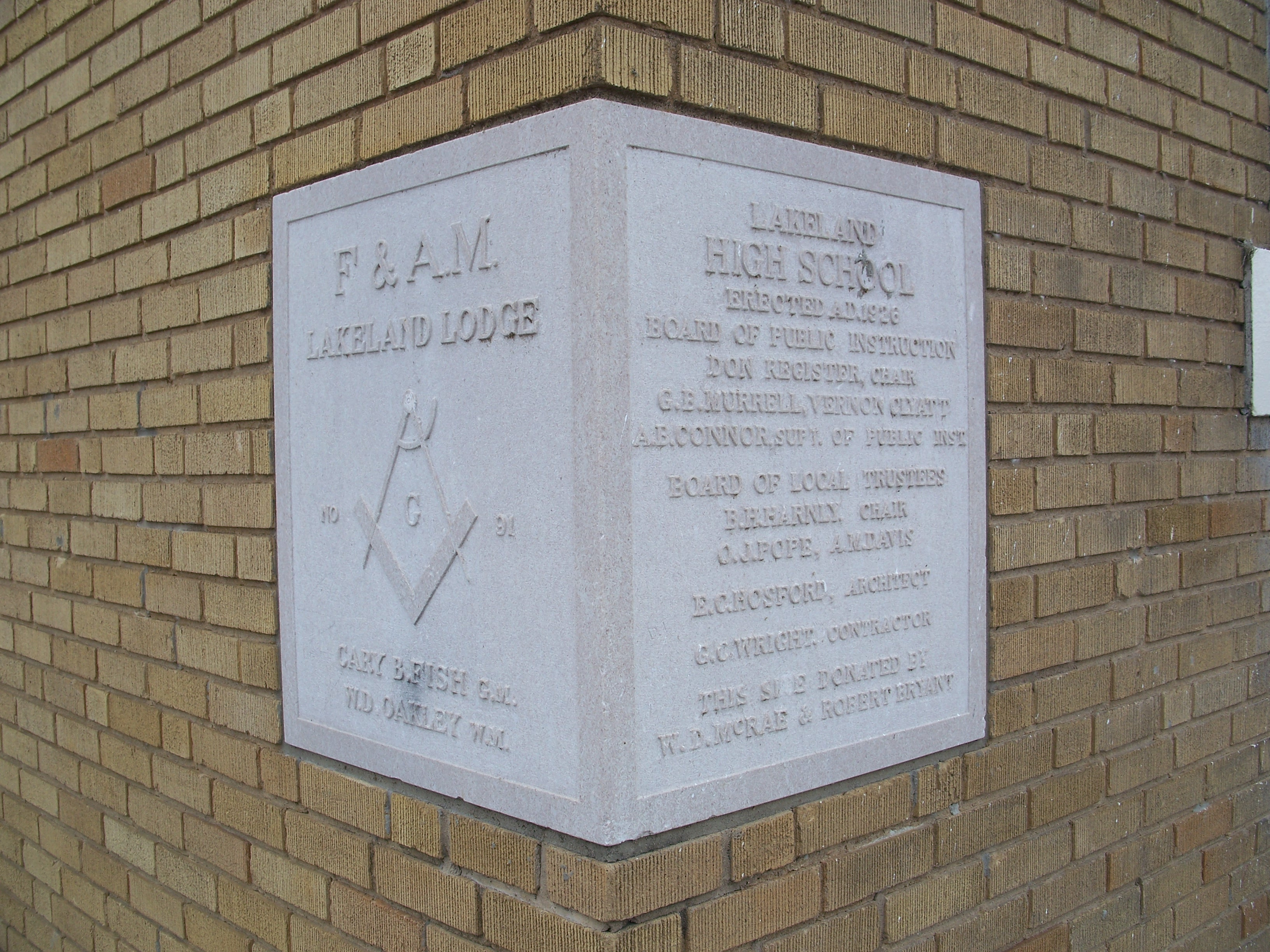
Cornerstone

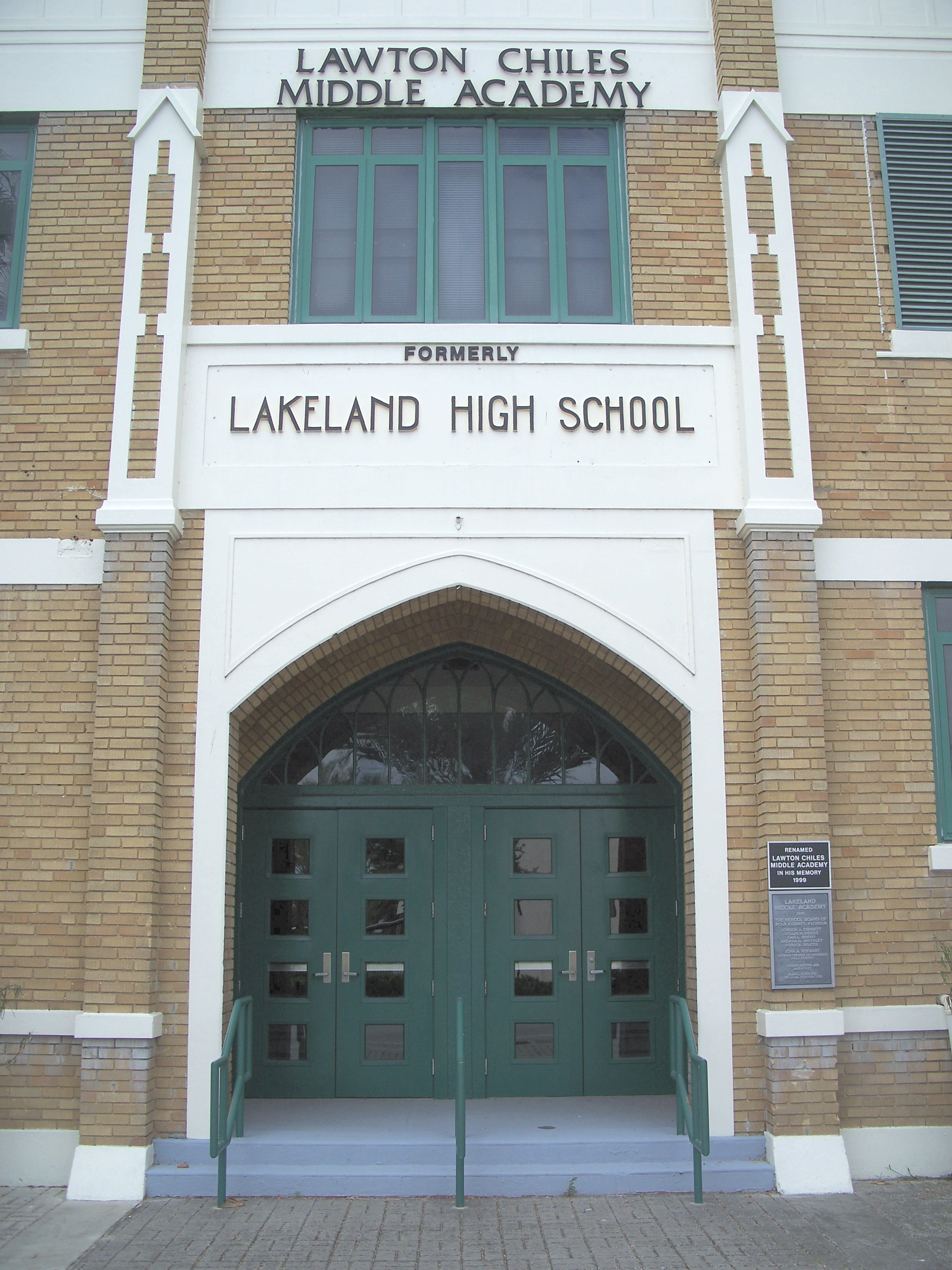
Entrance detail
