= Glades County Courthouse =

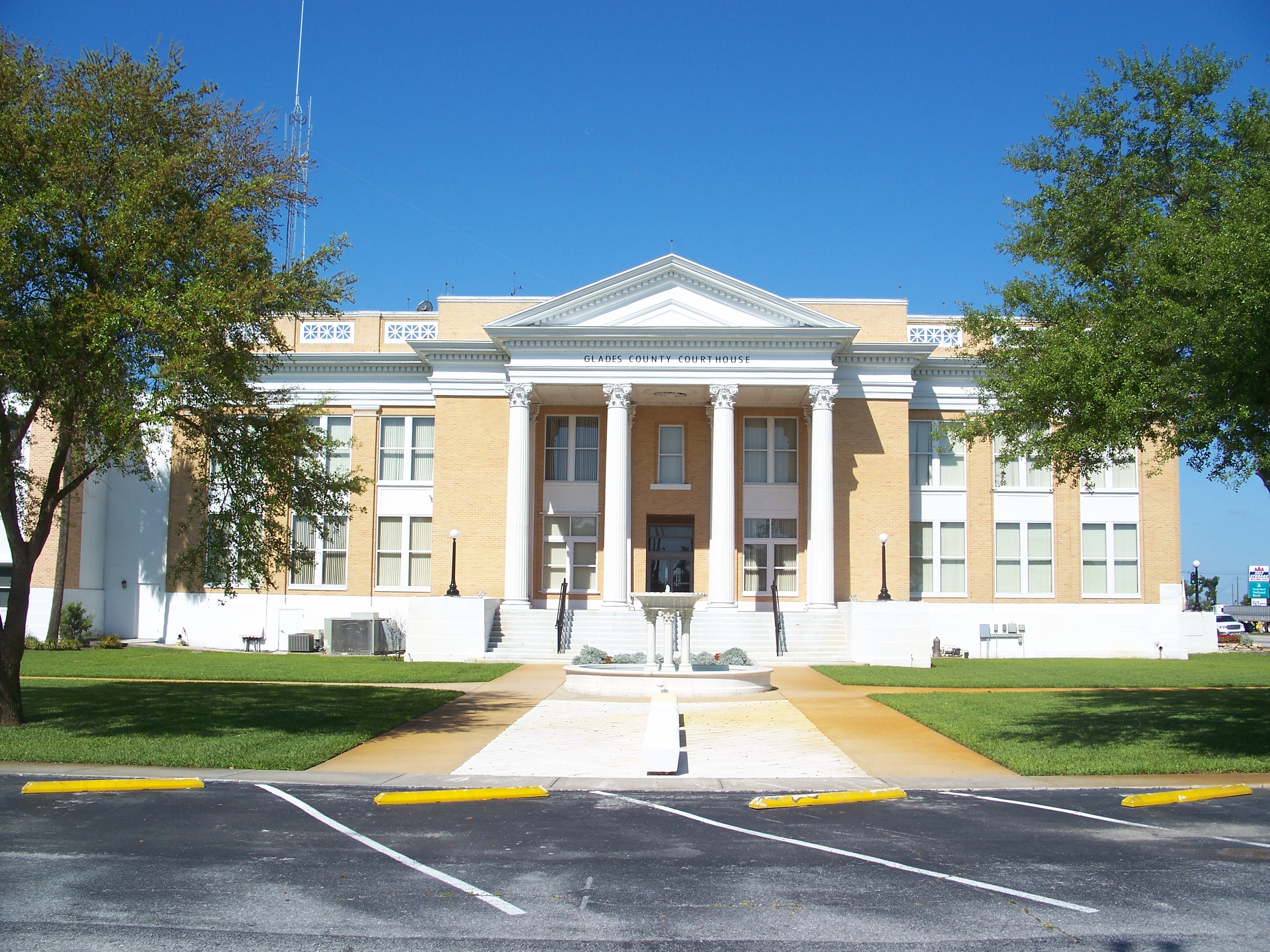
- Glades County Courthouse
- Interactive map of the Glades County Courthouse area

General information
- Architectural style: Classical Revival
- Location: Moore Haven, Florida, United States
- Coordinates: 26°49′58″N 81°5′50″W
- Completed: ca. 1928

Design and construction
- Architect: Edward Columbus Hosford

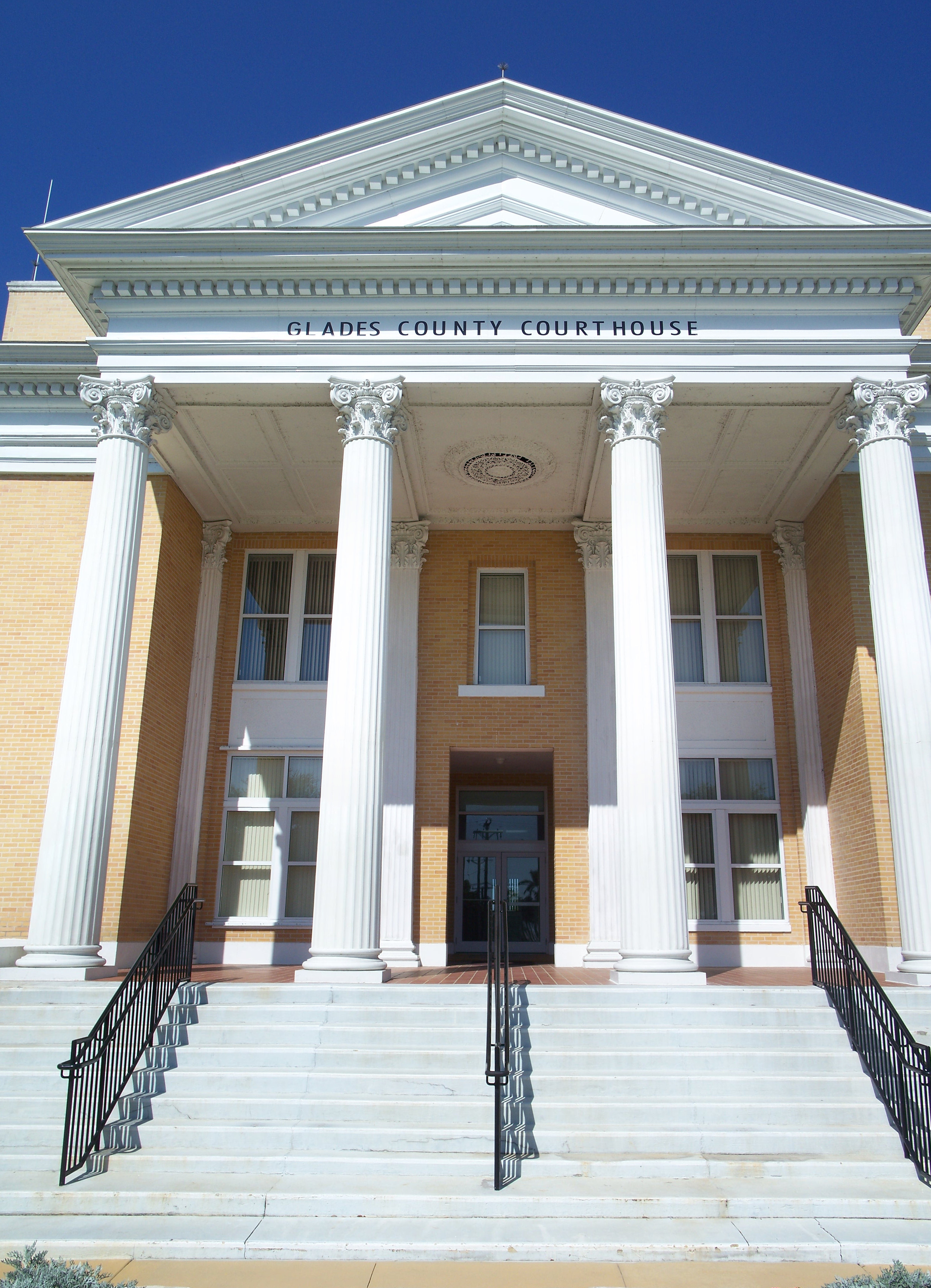
Entrance detail

The Glades County Courthouse is an historic courthouse building located at 500 Avenue J in Moore Haven, Florida. Built in 1928 in the Classical Revival style, it was designed by Georgia-born American architect Edward Columbus Hosford, who is noted for the courthouses and other buildings that he designed in Florida, Georgia and Texas.

In 1989, the Glades County Courthouse was listed in A Guide to Florida's Historic Architecture, published by the University of Florida Press.
