= Oates Building =

- U.S. National Register of Historic Places
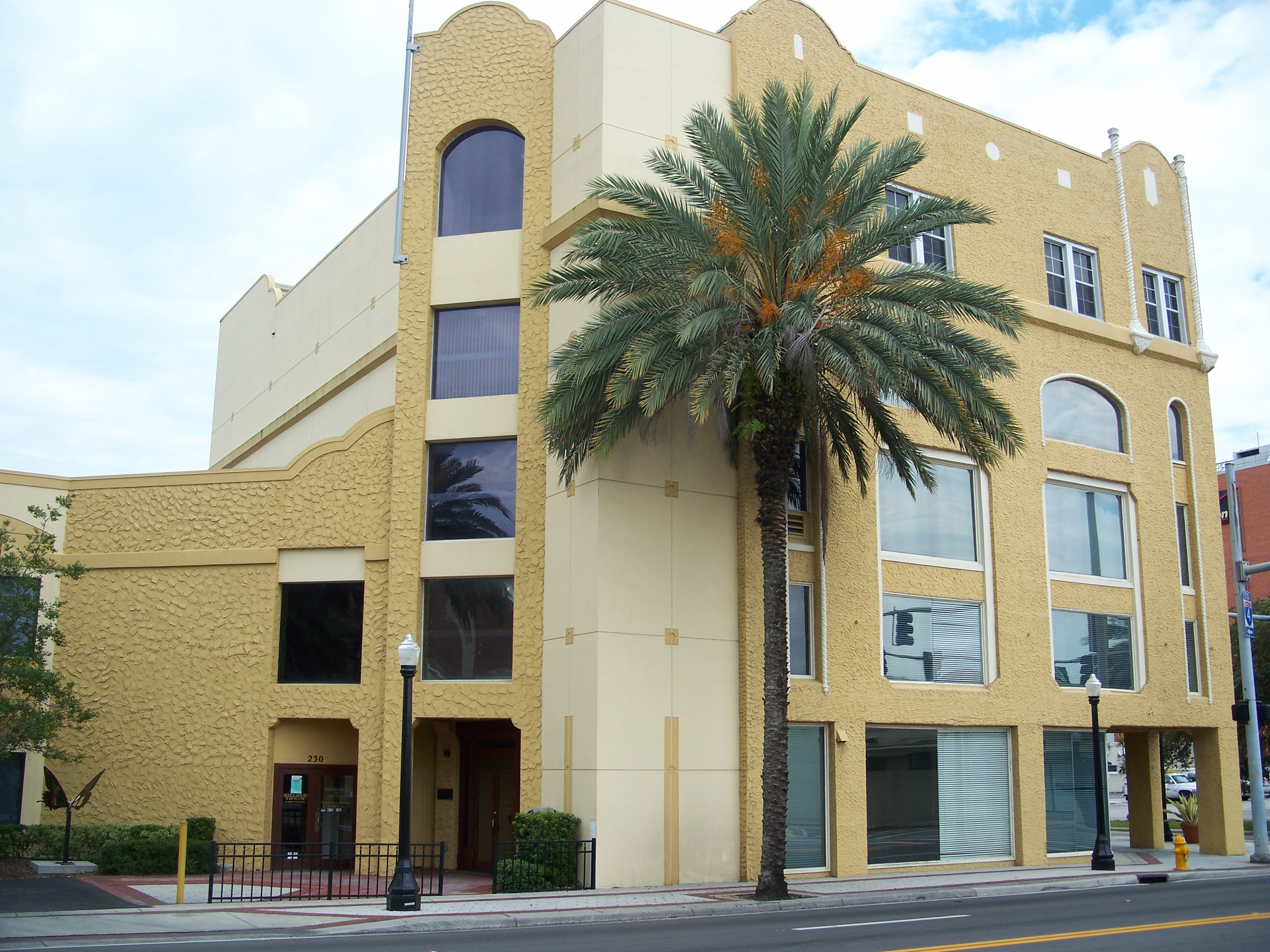

- Location within Florida Location within the United States
- Location: Lakeland, Polk County, Florida
- Coordinates: 28°2′29″N 81°57′26″W
- Built: 1925
- Architect: Edward Columbus Hosford
- Architectural style: Mission Revival-Spanish Colonial Revival
- NRHP reference No.: 95000925
- Added to NRHP: July 28, 1995

The Oates Building (former home of the Oates-Corley Furniture Company) is a historic site in Lakeland, Florida, United States. It was designed by architect Edward Columbus Hosford in the Mission Revival and Spanish Colonial Revival styles.

The Oates Building is located at 230 South Florida Avenue. On July 28, 1995, it was added to the U.S. National Register of Historic Places.

== Gallery ==
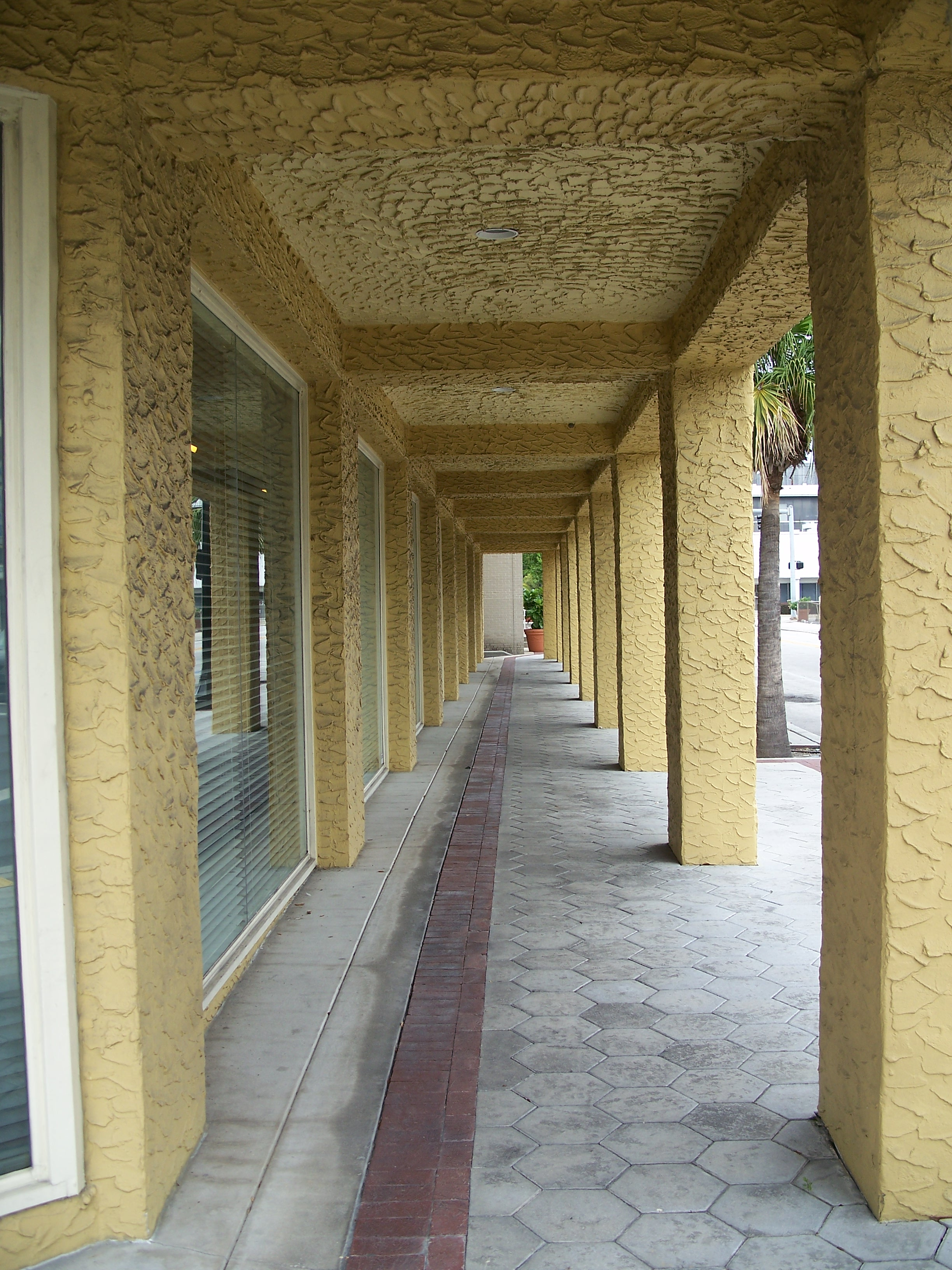
Colonnade

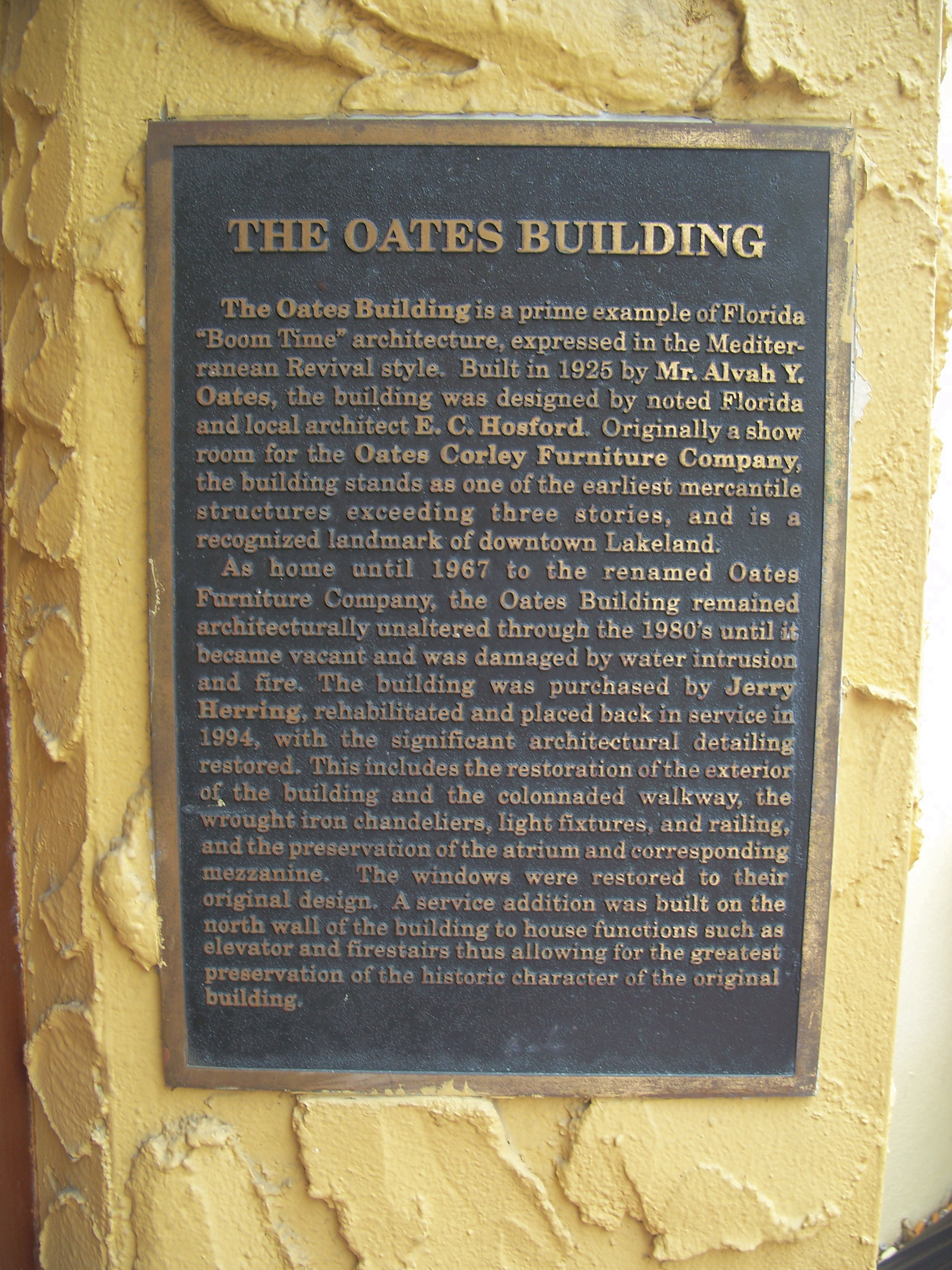
Informational plaque

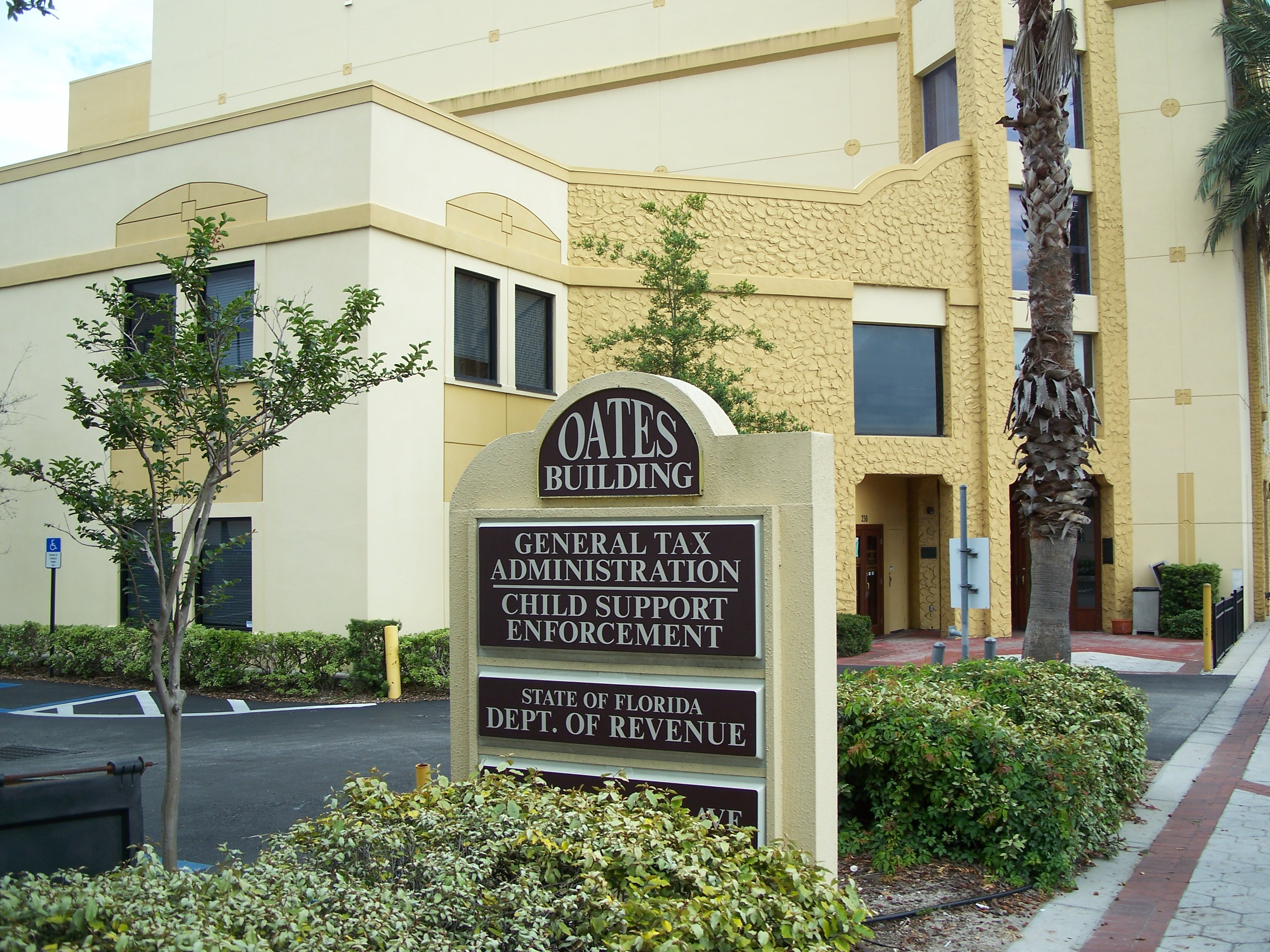
Sign outside

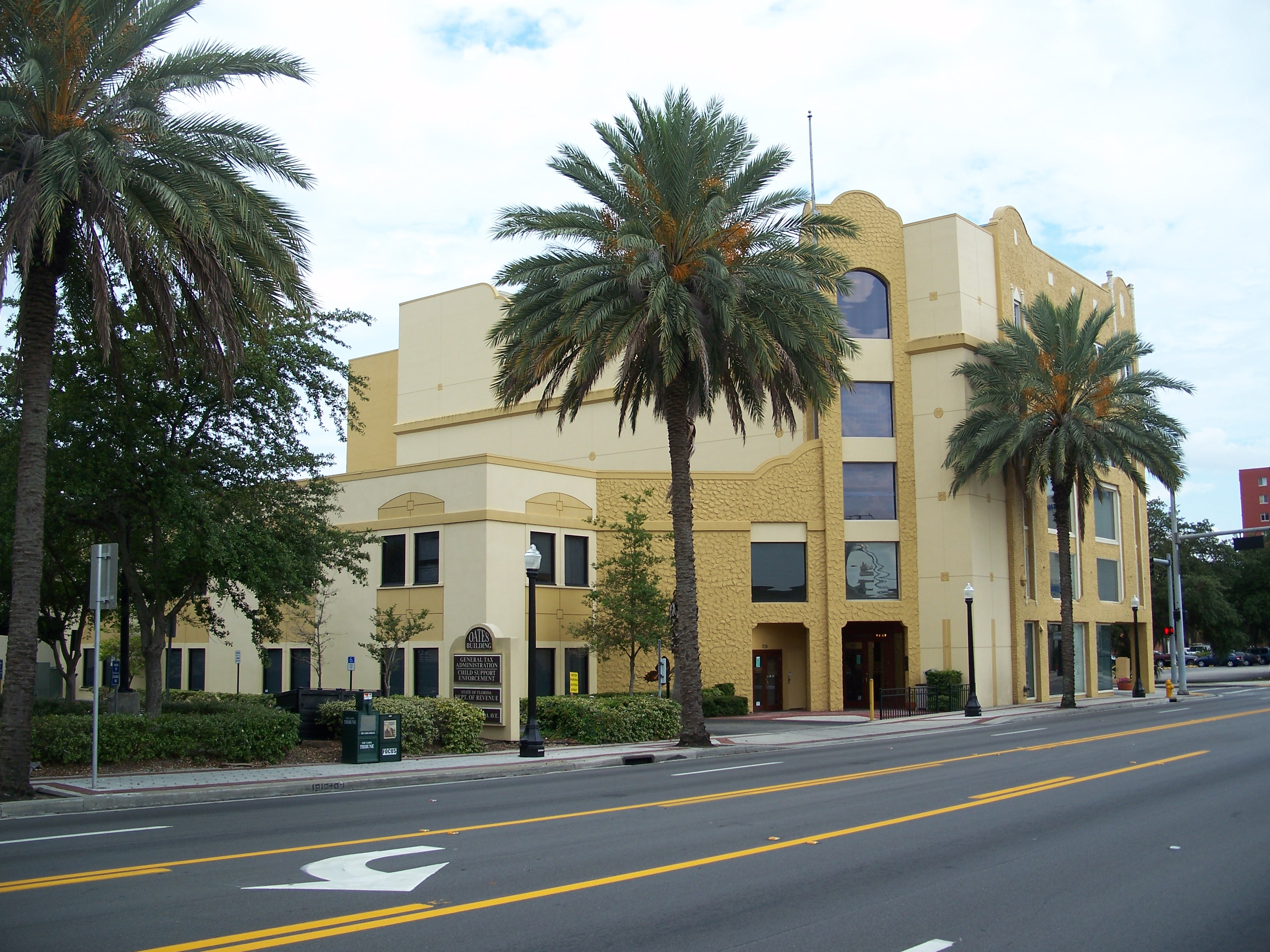
