= Baker Correctional Institution =

State prison in Florida, United States

Coordinates: 30°12′48″N 82°22′28″W

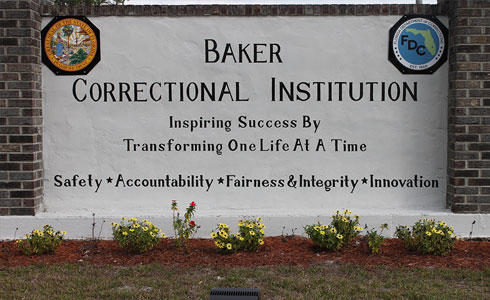
- Main entrance, c. 2018
- Interactive map of Baker Correctional Institution
- Location: 20706 U.S. Highway 90 West Sanderson, Florida
- Status: Temporarily Closed
- Capacity: 1,165
- Opened: 1978
- Managed by: Florida Department of Corrections

The Baker Correctional Institution was a state prison for men located in Sanderson, Baker County, Florida, owned and operated by the Florida Department of Corrections.

Since November 2009, Baker's mission has been to "prepare inmates for work release and aid in a successful re-entry into society." The facility has a mix of security levels, including minimum, medium, and close. Baker Correctional Institution opened in 1978 and has a maximum capacity of 1165 inmates.

In July 2015 two inmates died within a week: Antonio Gallashaw on the 28th, and Denis Robinson on the 30th.

In 2021, Baker Correctional Institution, along with New River Correctional Institution and Cross City Correctional Institution, was closed temporarily due to a staffing shortage.

== Migrant detention center ==
On August 14, 2025, Gov. Ron DeSantis announced the shuttered facility would be turned into an immigration detention center. The facility was dubbed 'Deportation Depot.' The Florida National Guard, rather than the Department of Corrections, will work at the facility. The facility can host up to 1300 migrants. With the proximity to Lake City Gateway Airport, the facility looks to be able to deport people from that airport.
