= Pasco County Courthouse =

- U.S. National Register of Historic Places
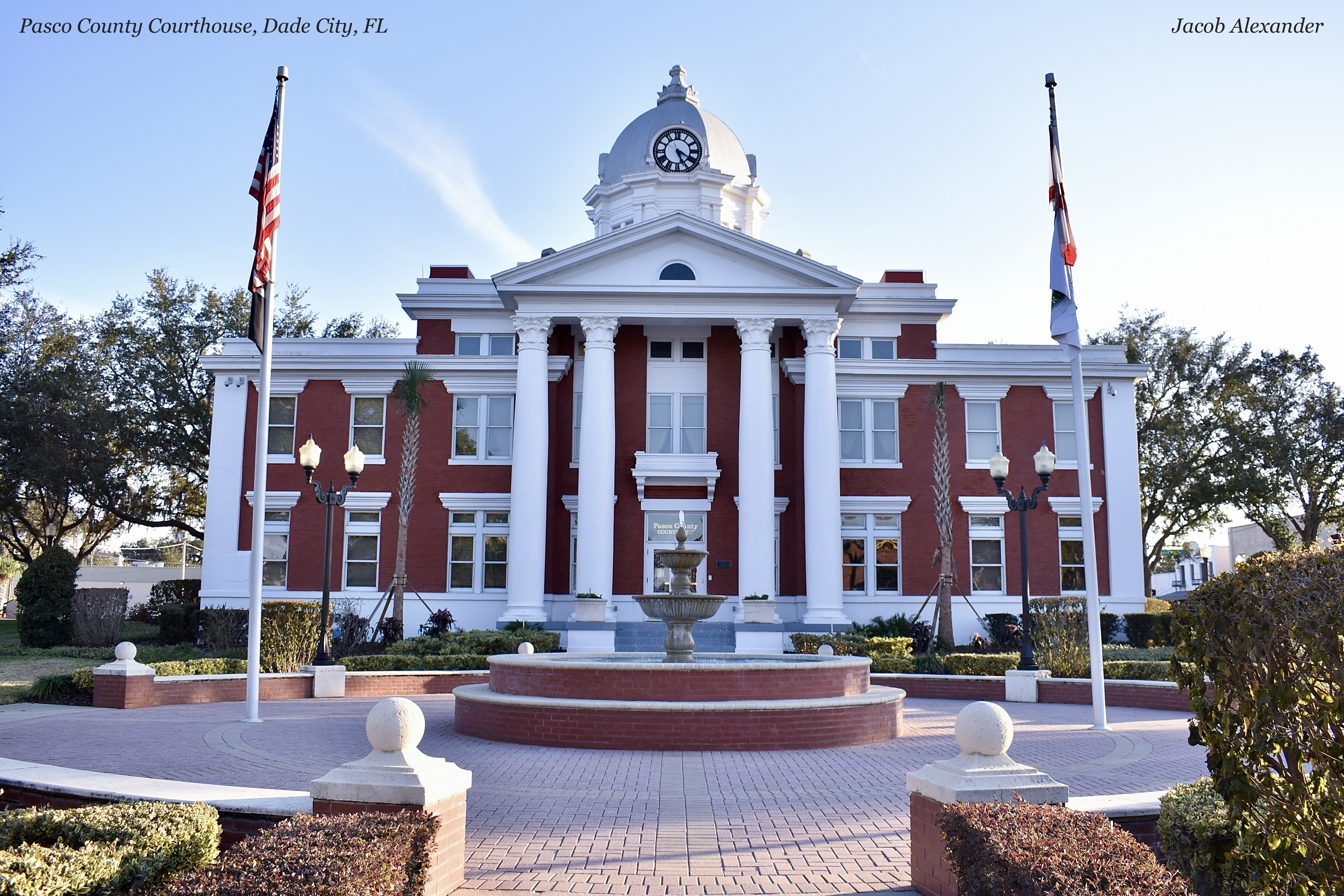
- Pasco County Courthouse (2026)

- Location within Florida Location within the United States
- Interactive map showing the location of Pasco County Courthouse
- Location: Dade City, Florida
- Coordinates: 28°21′52″N 82°11′19″W
- Built: 1909
- Architect: Edward Columbus Hosford; built by Mutual Construction Company
- Architectural style: Classical Revival
- NRHP reference No.: 06000843
- Added to NRHP: September 20, 2006

The Pasco County Courthouse (constructed in 1909) is a historic courthouse located at 37918 Meridian Avenue in Dade City, Pasco County, Florida. It was designed by Georgia-based architect Edward Columbus Hosford in the Beaux-Arts style. The courthouse was added to the United States National Register of Historic Places on September 20, 2006.

In recent years, a Valentine's Day tradition has developed where the Pasco County Clerk offers complimentary wedding ceremonies on the steps of the historic courthouse.

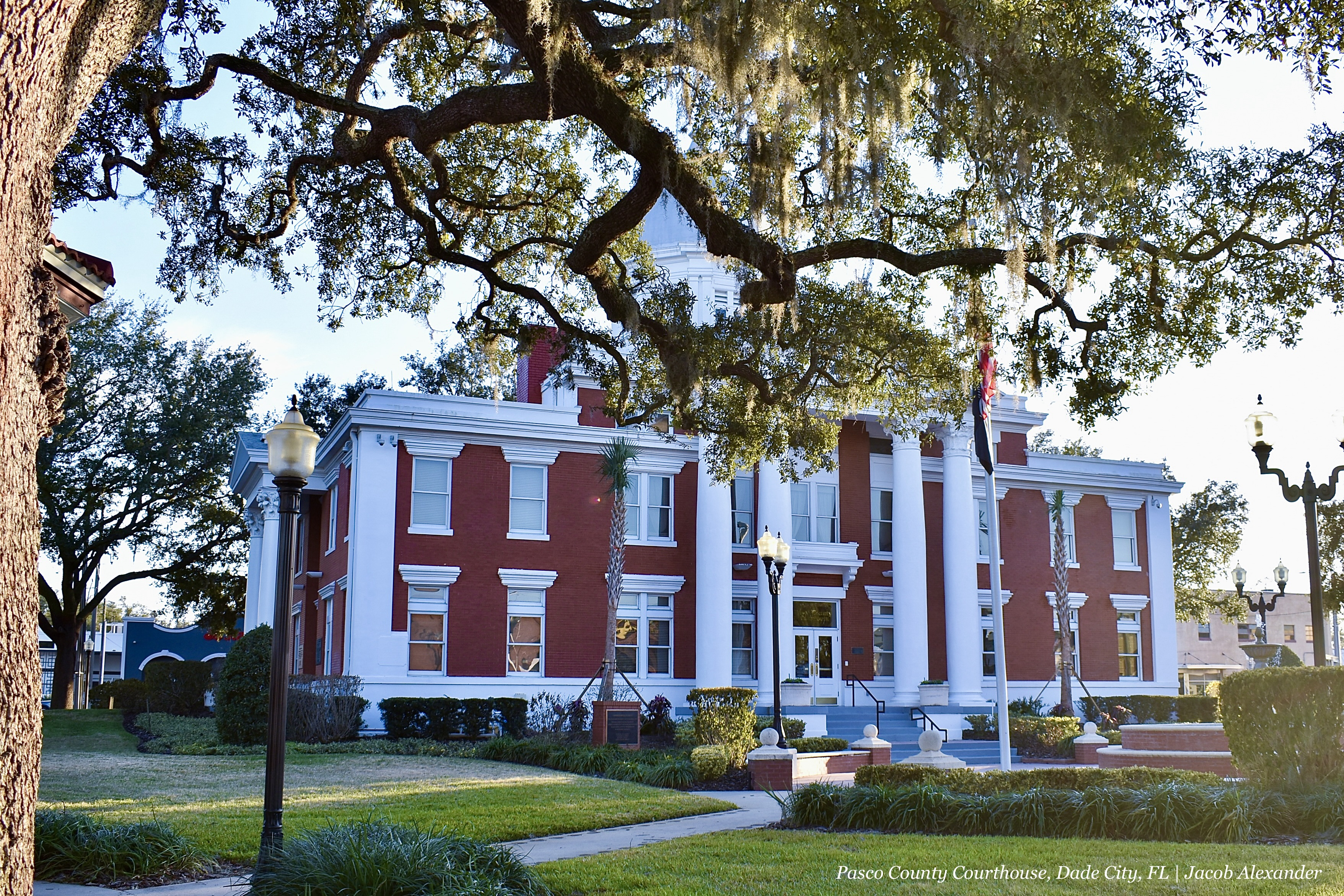
The courthouse viewed from beneath a live oak near the WWII Memorial and bandstand, on the northeast corner of the courthouse square.
