= Baker County, Florida =

County in Florida, United States

- County
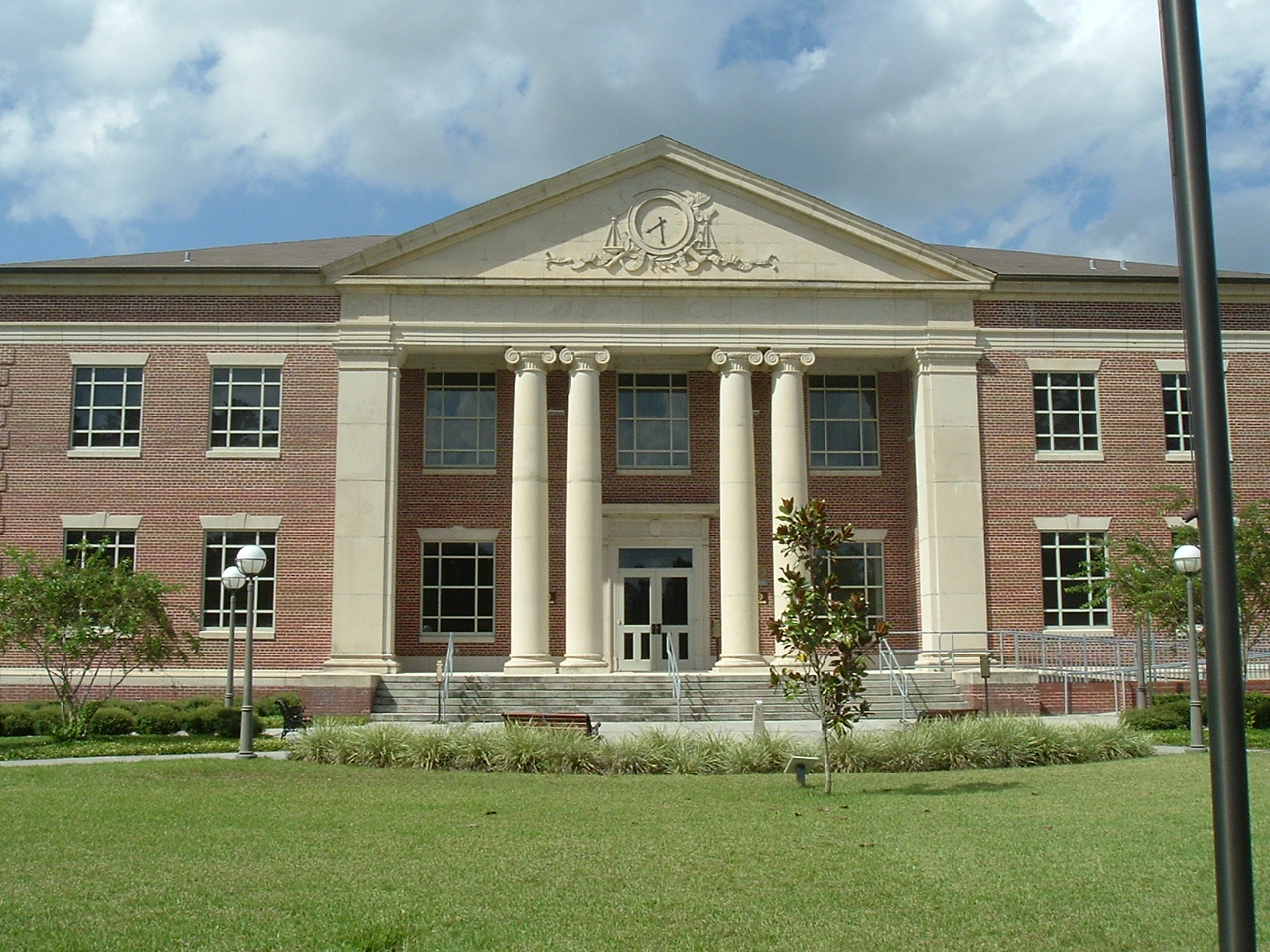
- Baker County Courthouse in Macclenny

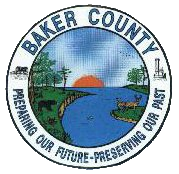
- Seal

- Location within the U.S. state of Florida
- Coordinates: 30°19′N 82°16′W
- Country: United States
- State: Florida
- Founded: February 8, 1861
- Named for: James McNair Baker
- Seat: Macclenny
- Largest city: Macclenny

Area
  - Total: 588.97 sq mi (1,525.4 km^{2})
  - Land: 585.23 sq mi (1,515.7 km^{2})
  - Water: 3.74 sq mi (9.7 km^{2})

Population (2020)
  - Total: 28,259
  - Estimate (2025): 29,737 ▲
  - Density: 48.287/sq mi (18.644/km^{2})
- Time zone: UTC−5 (Eastern)
  - Summer (DST): UTC−4 (EDT)
- Congressional district: 3rd
- Website: www.bakercountyfl.org

Baker County is a county in the U.S. state of Florida. As of the 2020 census, the population was 28,259. Its county seat is Macclenny. The county was founded in 1861 and is named for James McNair Baker, a judge and Confederate Senator. Baker County is included in the Jacksonville metropolitan area. In 1864, the Battle of Olustee, which was the only major American Civil War battle in Florida, was fought near Lake City in Baker County.

== History ==
Baker County was founded in 1861. It was named for James McNair Baker, a judge and Confederate senator. In 1864 the Battle of Olustee was fought near Lake City in Baker County. This was the only major American Civil War battle in Florida.

Much of the area was originally covered with pine flatwoods and cypress swamps, as was Columbia County to the west. Parts of both counties are included in Osceola National Forest. A lumber industry developed here, with sawmills constructed along rivers and waterways, where lumber was brought out by water. Turpentine was also produced. These industries employed many African American laborers.

== Geography ==
According to the U.S. Census Bureau, the county has a total area of 589 square miles (1,530 km^{2}), of which 585 square miles (1,520 km^{2}) is land and 3.7 square miles (9.6 km^{2}) (0.6%) is water. The extreme northern part of the county lies within the Okefenokee Swamp and its federally protected areas.

The St. Mary's River passes through Baker and numerous other counties. The St. Marys River is a remote blackwater river, rising in southeastern Georgia and flowing into northeastern Florida, where it forms the easternmost border between the two states.

=== Adjacent counties ===
- Charlton County, Georgia – north
- Ware County, Georgia – north
- Nassau County, Florida – northeast
- Duval County, Florida – east
- Clay County, Florida – southeast
- Union County, Florida – south
- Bradford County, Florida – south
- Columbia County, Florida – west
- Clinch County, Georgia – northwest

=== National protected areas ===
- Okefenokee National Wildlife Refuge (part)
- Osceola National Forest (part)

== Transportation ==
=== Major highways ===
- I-10 is the main west-to-east interstate highway in the county, and serves as the unofficial dividing line between northern and southern Baker County. It enters the county from Osceola National Forest and contains five interchanges within the county; the first being US 90 in Olustee which is the enterence to the Olustee Battlefield Historic State Park (Exits 324), followed by Baker CR 229 (Exit 327) south of Sanderson and Baker CR 125 (Exit 333) south of Glen St Mary. The last two interchanges are in Macclenny; SR 121 (Exits 335), and SR 228 (Exit 336). Beyond this point I-10 runs through Nassau and Duval Counties into Downtown Jacksonville.
- US 90 was the primary west-to-east route through Baker County until it was succeeded by Interstate 10.
- SR 2 runs west to east through the northwest portion of the county, beginning at the northeast corner of Columbia County, then passing through John M. Bethea State Forest and becoming Georgia State Route 94 after crossing the bridge over the Saint Mary's River.
- SR 121 is a south to north road that runs southwest to northeast from Raiford in Union County to just before the interchange with Interstate 10, and then straight south to north through downtown Macclenny and later towards rural Baker County, until it crosses a series of bridges over the Saint Mary's River where it takes a long journey through Georgia and South Carolina as a tri-state de facto auxiliary route from U.S. Route 21 in Rock Hill, South Carolina.
- SR 228 / CR 228 is a short northwest-to-southeast state highway in Macclenny that has two county extensions. The first is a south-to-north extension beginning at US 90 leading to SR 121 north of the town limits. The second is a bi-county extension running southeast of Interstate 10 to US 301 in Duval County near the resumption of a state road which passes through Westside Jacksonville, Downtown Jacksonville and all the way to the Hogan section of Southside Jacksonville.

=== Railroads ===
The main railroad line through Baker County is the Florida Gulf & Atlantic Railroad which acquired the former CSX lines from Pensacola to Baldwin on June 1, 2019. CSX retained trackage rights on that route. No passenger trains stop anywhere in Baker County, but Amtrak's Sunset Limited served the Tallahassee Subdivision until Hurricane Katrina ravaged the Gulf Coast in 2005.

The other major railroad line in the county is Norfolk Southern Railway's Valdosta District, which spans northwest to southeast from the Okefenokee National Wildlife Refuge at the Georgia State Line, north of the Columbia-Baker County Line, through Baxter at a bridge over the Saint Mary's River which cuts through the "Georgia Bend" and eventually leads to the Jacksonville Terminal.

Additionally, the Jacksonville and Southwestern Railroad was a former Atlantic Coast Line Railroad line running through the southeast portion of the county that was abandoned by CSX in 1992. The line has been converted to a rail trail between Baldwin and Jacksonville in Duval County, and in Raiford in Union County, but no known plans exist to connect the two segments.

== Demographics ==
Historical population
Census	Pop.	Note	%±
1870	1,325		—
1880	2,303		73.8%
1890	3,333		44.7%
1900	4,516		35.5%
1910	4,805		6.4%
1920	5,622		17.0%
1930	6,273		11.6%
1940	6,510		3.8%
1950	6,313		−3.0%
1960	7,363		16.6%
1970	9,242		25.5%
1980	15,289		65.4%
1990	18,486		20.9%
2000	22,259		20.4%
2010	27,115		21.8%
2020	28,259		4.2%
2025 (est.)	29,737	▲	5.2%
U.S. Decennial Census; 1790–1960 1900–1990; 1990–2000 2010–2020

=== Racial and ethnic composition ===
Baker County, Florida – Racial and ethnic composition Note: the US Census treats Hispanic/Latino as an ethnic category. This table excludes Latinos from the racial categories and assigns them to a separate category. Hispanics/Latinos may be of any race.
Race / Ethnicity (NH = Non-Hispanic)	Pop 1980	Pop 1990	Pop 2000	Pop 2010	Pop 2020	% 1980	% 1990	% 2000	% 2010	% 2020
White alone (NH)	12,760	15,444	18,389	22,353	22,185	83.46%	83.54%	82.61%	82.44%	78.51%
Black or African American alone (NH)	2,286	2,738	3,083	3,651	3,825	14.95%	14.81%	13.85%	13.46%	13.54%
Native American or Alaska Native alone (NH)	24	58	82	72	109	0.16%	0.31%	0.37%	0.27%	0.39%
Asian alone (NH)	18	44	88	129	157	0.12%	0.24%	0.40%	0.48%	0.56%
Native Hawaiian or Pacific Islander alone (NH)	x	x	7	5	14	x	x	0.03%	0.02%	0.05%
Other race alone (NH)	17	2	5	13	84	0.11%	0.01%	0.02%	0.05%	0.30%
Mixed race or Multiracial (NH)	x	x	186	372	912	x	x	0.84%	1.37%	3.23%
Hispanic or Latino (any race)	184	200	419	520	973	1.20%	1.08%	1.88%	1.92%	3.44%
Total	15,289	18,486	22,259	27,115	28,259	100.00%	100.00%	100.00%	100.00%	100.00%

2023 Racial Demographics in Baker County, Florida by Census tracts. Legend: Non-Hispanic White 60–70% 70–80% >90%

=== 2020 census ===
As of the 2020 census, the county had a population of 28,259, 9,087 households, and 6,448 families residing in the county.

The median age was 38.5 years, with 23.4% of residents under the age of 18 and 15.1% of residents 65 years of age or older.

For every 100 females there were 114.9 males, and for every 100 females age 18 and over there were 117.4 males age 18 and over.

The racial makeup of the county was 79.9% White, 13.6% Black or African American, 0.4% American Indian and Alaska Native, 0.6% Asian, <0.1% Native Hawaiian and Pacific Islander, 1.6% from some other race, and 3.9% from two or more races. Hispanic or Latino residents of any race comprised 3.4% of the population.

38.5% of residents lived in urban areas, while 61.5% lived in rural areas.

There were 9,087 households in the county, of which 36.9% had children under the age of 18 living in them. Of all households, 52.6% were married-couple households, 16.6% were households with a male householder and no spouse or partner present, and 24.5% were households with a female householder and no spouse or partner present. About 20.6% of all households were made up of individuals and 9.7% had someone living alone who was 65 years of age or older.

There were 9,809 housing units, of which 7.4% were vacant. Among occupied housing units, 77.1% were owner-occupied and 22.9% were renter-occupied. The homeowner vacancy rate was 1.0% and the rental vacancy rate was 7.4%.

=== 2000 census ===
As of the census of 2000, there were 22,259 people, 7,043 households, and 5,599 families residing in the county. The population density was 38 inhabitants per square mile (15/km^{2}). There were 7,592 housing units at an average density of 13 per square mile (5.0/km^{2}). The racial makeup of the county was 84.04% White, 13.92% Black or African American, 0.38% Native American, 0.40% Asian, 0.03% Pacific Islander, 0.25% from other races, and 0.98% from two or more races. 1.88% of the population were Hispanic or Latino of any race. 34.5% were of American, 9.9% Irish, 8.6% English and 6.6% German ancestry according to Census 2000. Those claiming "American" ancestry are of predominantly English ancestry but most people in Baker County who are Anglo-European tend to identify simply as American. 97.2% spoke English and 2.5% Spanish as their first language.

There were 7,043 households, out of which 41.20% had children under the age of 18 living with them, 61.70% were married couples living together, 13.10% had a female householder with no husband present, and 20.50% were non-families. 17.10% of all households were made up of individuals, and 6.90% had someone living alone who was 65 years of age or older. The average household size was 2.86 and the average family size was 3.20.

In the county, the population was spread out, with 27.50% under the age of 18, 9.90% from 18 to 24, 30.70% from 25 to 44, 22.70% from 45 to 64, and 9.20% who were 65 years of age or older. The median age was 34 years. For every 100 females there were 119.79 males. For every 100 females age 18 and over, there were 112.40 males.

The median income for a household in the county was $40,035, and the median income for a family was $43,503. Males had a median income of $30,240 versus $21,279 for females. The per capita income for the county was $15,164. About 11.40% of families and 14.70% of the population were below the poverty line, including 22.20% of those under age 18 and 8.60% of those age 65 or over.

== Education ==
The Baker County School District serves public school students in the county.

The main library serving Baker County is the Emily Taber Public Library. The building used to be the Old Baker County Courthouse, built in 1908. The library director is April Teel.

== Government ==
Baker County elects the constitutional officers of sheriff, tax collector, property appraiser, supervisor of elections, and clerk of the circuit court. It is also one of the thirty-eight counties in which the superintendent of schools is elected. There are five members of the county commission, each of whom is elected from a district.

Baker County elected officials
Office	Officeholder	Party	Current term ends
Sheriff	Scotty Rhoden	Republican	2028
Clerk of the Court	Stacie D. Harvey	Republican	2028
Property Appraiser	Tim Sweat	Republican	2028
Supervisor of Elections	Chris Milton	Republican	2028
Tax Collector	Amy Dugger	Republican	2028
Superintendent of Schools	Wyatt Milton	Republican	2028

Baker County Board of County Commissioners
District	Commissioner	Party	Current term ends
1	Ronald Mann	Republican	2028
2	Jimmy Anderson	Republican	2026
3	Tyler Mobley	Republican	2028
4	Blake Iverson	Republican	2026
5	Mark Hartley	Republican	2028

== Politics ==
=== Voter registration ===
As of September 1, 2020, Baker County has a Republican majority, with a Democratic minority.

Name	Number of voters	%
Democratic	4,446	27.2%
Republican	9,910	60.7%
Others	1,963	12.1%
Total	16,319	

=== Statewide elections ===
United States presidential election results for Baker County, Florida
Year	Republican		Democratic		Third party(ies)	
Year	No.	%	No.	%	No.	%
1904	120	35.40%	207	61.06%	12	3.54%
1908	104	30.95%	152	45.24%	80	23.81%
1912	37	11.18%	168	50.76%	126	38.07%
1916	52	9.25%	439	78.11%	71	12.63%
1920	115	22.64%	346	68.11%	47	9.25%
1924	124	32.72%	215	56.73%	40	10.55%
1928	676	72.38%	242	25.91%	16	1.71%
1932	87	6.37%	1,278	93.63%	0	0.00%
1936	116	6.94%	1,555	93.06%	0	0.00%
1940	114	7.78%	1,352	92.22%	0	0.00%
1944	127	10.05%	1,137	89.95%	0	0.00%
1948	112	9.52%	849	72.19%	215	18.28%
1952	419	22.04%	1,482	77.96%	0	0.00%
1956	366	20.23%	1,443	79.77%	0	0.00%
1960	398	21.32%	1,469	78.68%	0	0.00%
1964	1,121	49.65%	1,137	50.35%	0	0.00%
1968	294	10.72%	487	17.75%	1,962	71.53%
1972	1,943	83.64%	379	16.32%	1	0.04%
1976	1,058	25.22%	2,985	71.16%	152	3.62%
1980	2,283	45.88%	2,611	52.47%	82	1.65%
1984	3,485	71.62%	1,381	28.38%	0	0.00%
1988	3,418	71.49%	1,355	28.34%	8	0.17%
1992	3,418	50.59%	1,976	29.25%	1,362	20.16%
1996	3,686	55.54%	2,273	34.25%	678	10.22%
2000	5,611	68.80%	2,392	29.33%	152	1.86%
2004	7,738	77.73%	2,180	21.90%	37	0.37%
2008	8,672	78.22%	2,327	20.99%	88	0.79%
2012	8,975	78.80%	2,311	20.29%	104	0.91%
2016	10,294	81.02%	2,112	16.62%	299	2.35%
2020	11,911	84.58%	2,037	14.47%	134	0.95%
2024	12,926	86.11%	1,982	13.20%	103	0.69%

United States Senate election results for Baker County, Florida1
Year	Republican		Democratic		Third party(ies)	
Year	No.	%	No.	%	No.	%
2024	12,415	83.90%	2,161	14.60%	221	1.49%

United States Senate election results for Baker County, Florida3
Year	Republican		Democratic		Third party(ies)	
Year	No.	%	No.	%	No.	%
2022	9,431	88.26%	1,181	11.05%	74	0.69%

Florida Gubernatorial election results for Baker County
Year	Republican		Democratic		Third party(ies)	
Year	No.	%	No.	%	No.	%
1994	3,600	68.52%	1,654	31.48%	0	0.00%
1998	3,268	71.14%	1,326	28.86%	0	0.00%
2002	4,515	69.22%	1,961	30.06%	47	0.72%
2006	4,335	69.39%	1,738	27.82%	174	2.79%
2010	4,940	62.34%	2,731	34.46%	253	3.19%
2014	5,956	70.54%	2,100	24.87%	388	4.59%
2018	8,687	82.37%	1,760	16.69%	99	0.94%
2022	9,594	89.44%	1,092	10.18%	41	0.38%

== Industry ==
Baker County is home to a Walmart distribution center, several small manufacturing businesses, and Acreage Holdings, a cannabis cultivation facility. There are also several local, regional, state (the Baker Correctional Institution), and federal prisons in the western part of the county, bordering several more such facilities in Columbia County.

== Communities ==
=== City ===
- Macclenny

=== Town ===
- Glen St. Mary

=== Unincorporated communities ===
- Baxter
- Cuyler
- Margaretta
- Manning
- Macedonia
- Olustee
- Sanderson
- Taylor

== See also ==
- National Register of Historic Places listings in Baker County, Florida
- List of counties in Florida
