= Old Central Grammar School =

- U.S. National Register of Historic Places
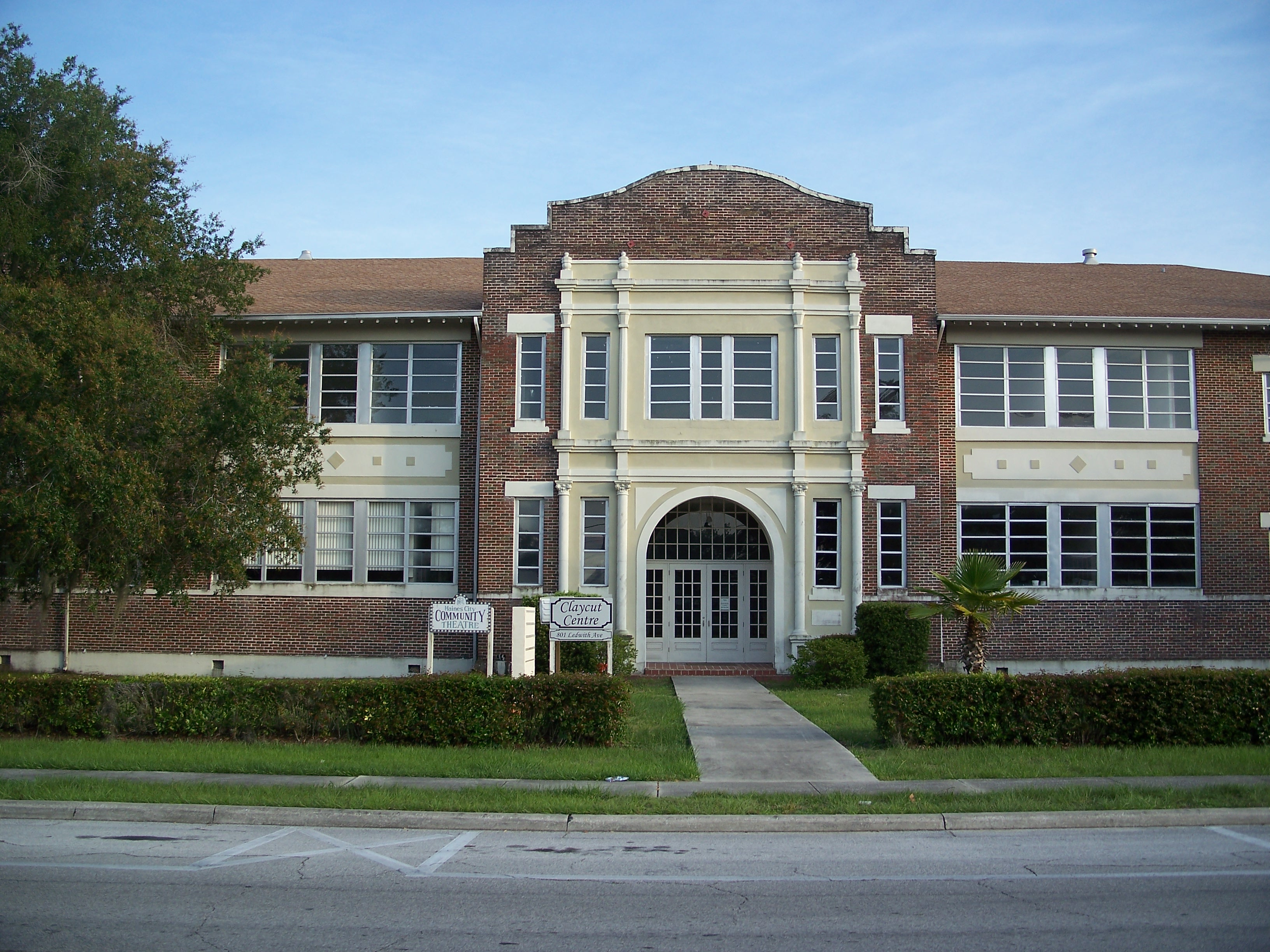

- Location within Florida Location within the United States
- Location: 801 Ledwith Ave., Haines City, Florida
- Coordinates: 28°06′12″N 81°37′29″W
- Built: 1925
- Architect: Edward Columbus Hosford; Paul Smith, builder
- Architectural style: Mediterranean Revival-Spanish Revival
- MPS: Haines City MPS
- NRHP reference No.: 94000160
- Added to NRHP: March 17, 1994

The Old Central Grammar School (also known as the Haines City Middle School Annex or Fellowship Dining-Ridge) is a historic school in Haines City, Florida. Built in 1925, it was designed by architect Edward Columbus Hosford in the Mediterranean Revival and Spanish Revival style.

On March 17, 1994, it was added to the U.S. National Register of Historic Places. After being used for several years as a community theatre, the building is now part of Daniel Jenkins Academy of Technology, a middle school in the Polk County Public Schools district.

== Gallery ==
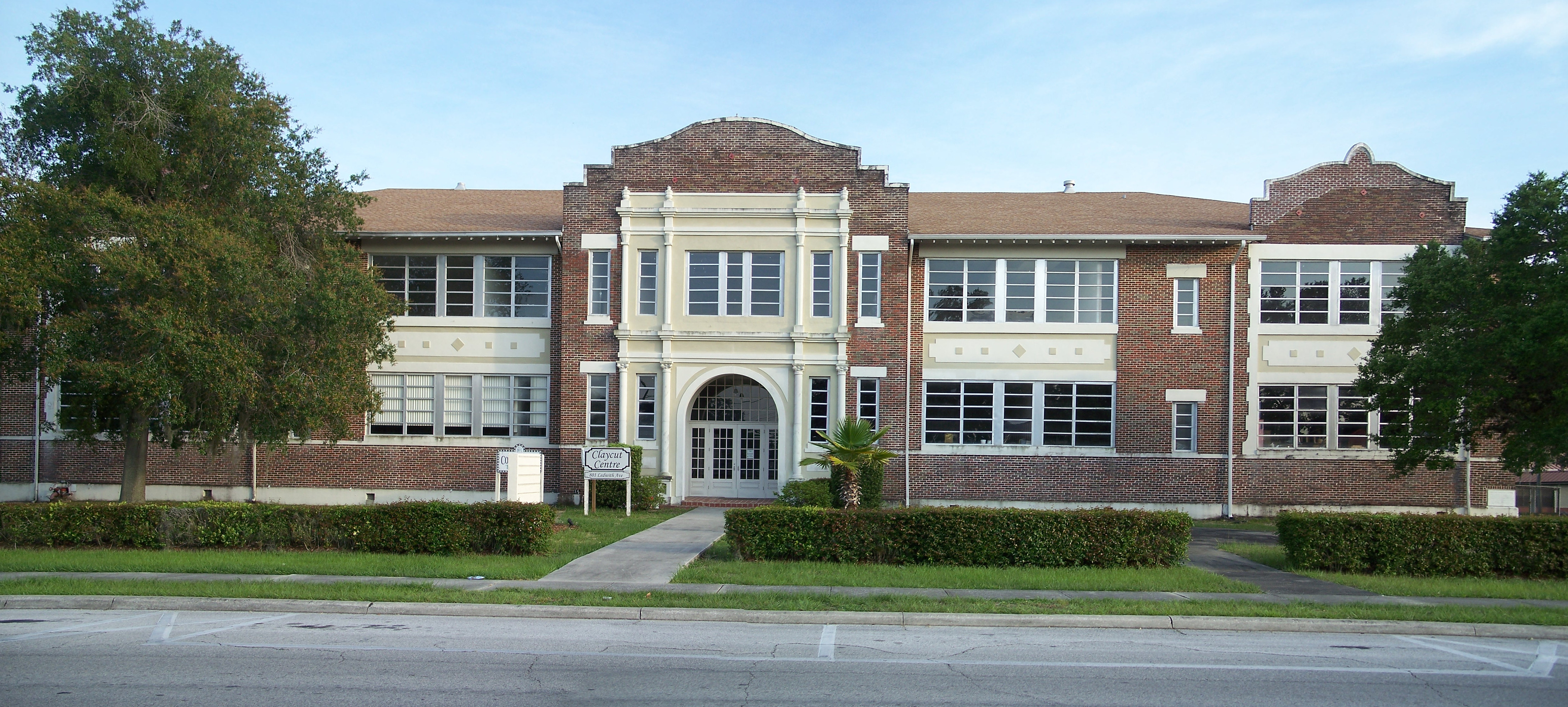

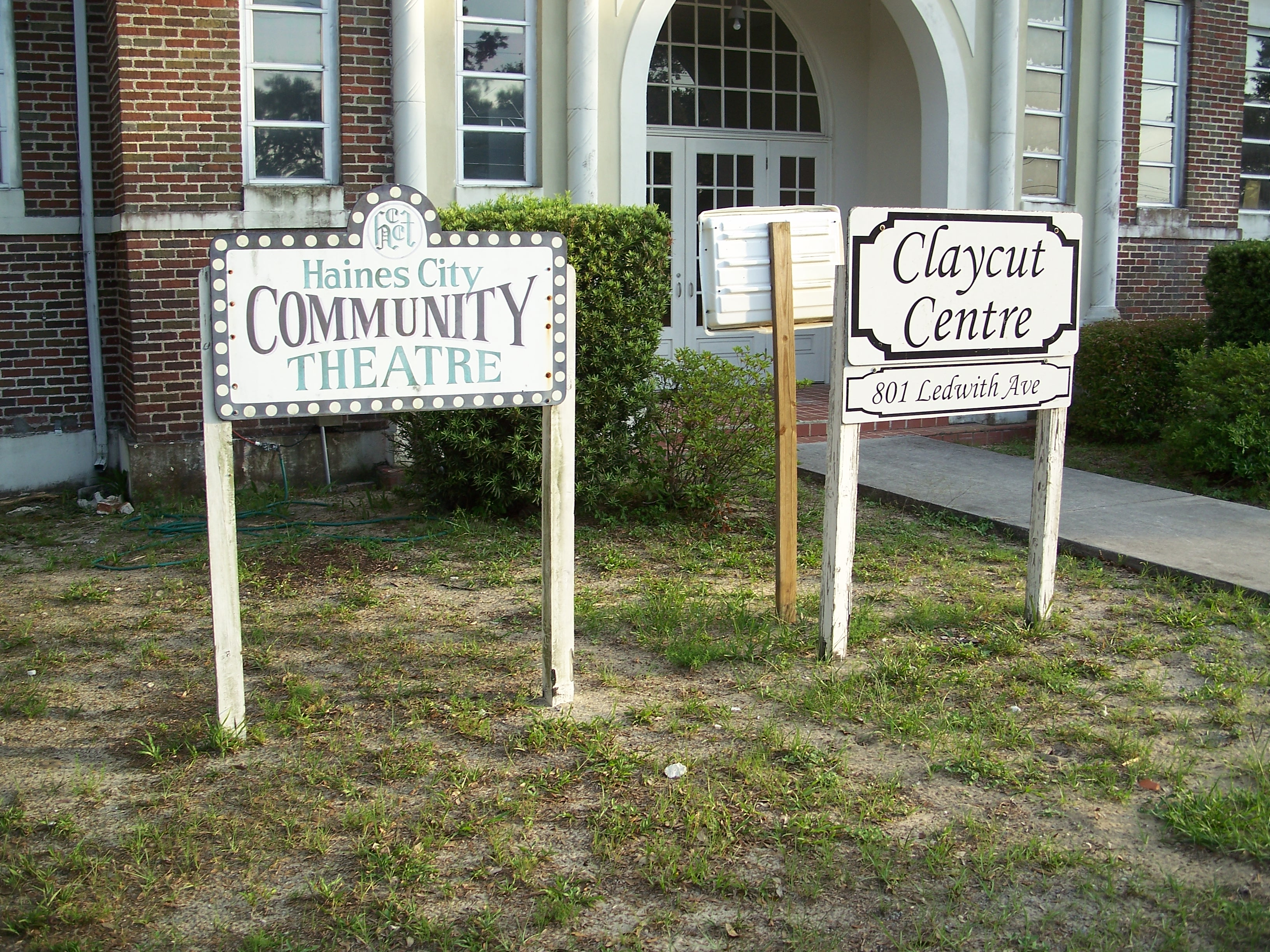

== References and external links ==
- Florida's Office of Cultural and Historical Programs
  - Polk County listings
  - Clay Cut Centre
