= Burnsed Blockhouse =

United States historic place

- U.S. National Register of Historic Places
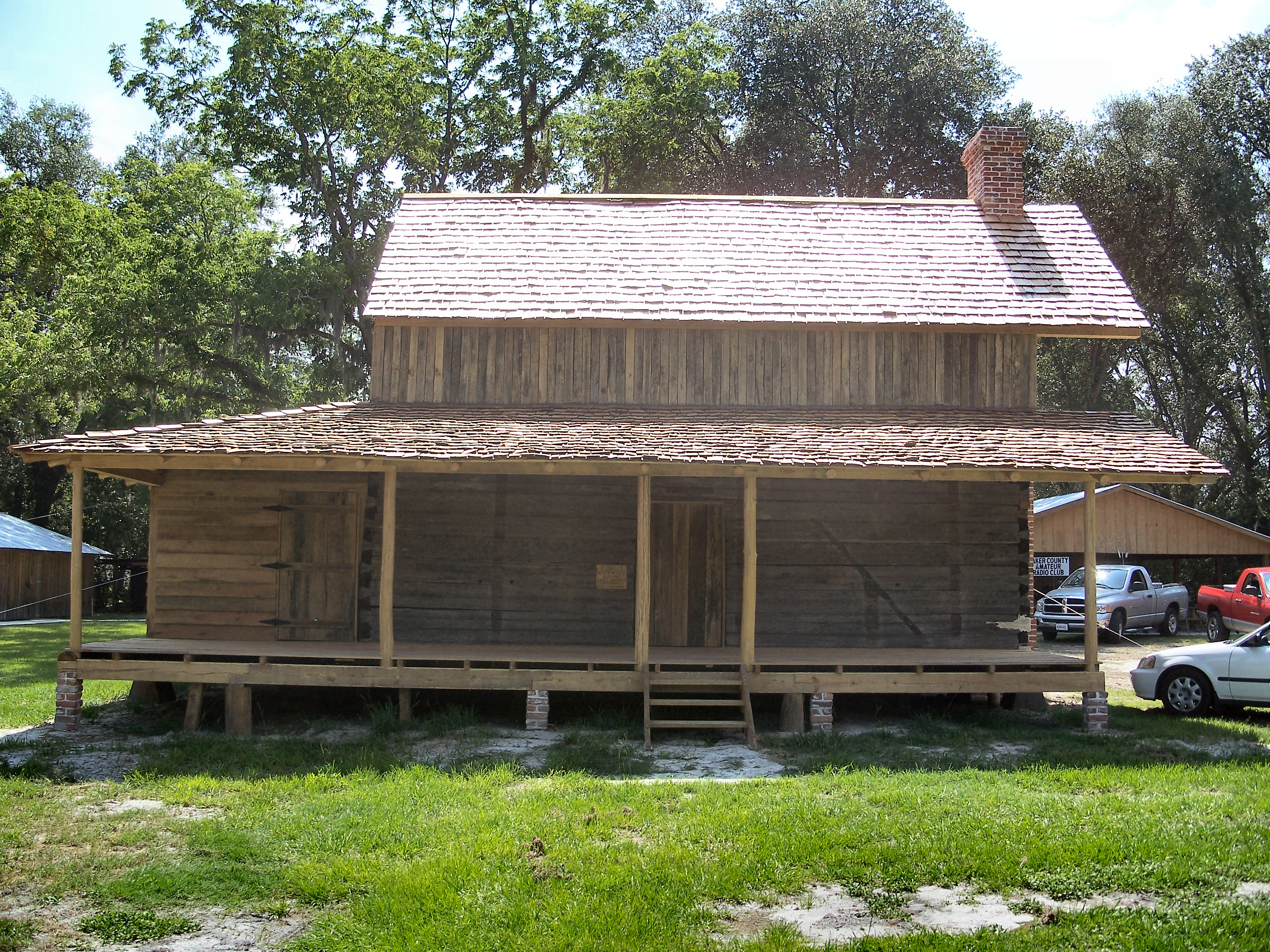
- The restored Burnsed Blockhouse, in Heritage Park

- Location within Florida Location within the United States
- Location: Macclenny, Florida
- Coordinates: 30°16′45″N 82°8′0″W
- Built: 1837
- Architectural style: Frame Vernacular
- NRHP reference No.: 73000567
- Added to NRHP: 7 May 1973

The Burnsed Blockhouse (also known as the Carl Brown House) is a historic site originally located north of Sanderson, Florida, United States, off Jacksonville Road. On May 7, 1973, it was added to the U.S. National Register of Historic Places. The blockhouse, probably the oldest structure in Baker County, was later moved from Sanderson to Heritage Park in Macclenny.

The only example of its distinctive design in Florida, the structure was built by settler James Burnsed (1817–1885) in 1837 by order of President Andrew Jackson, probably as a non-military defense to protect settlers from Seminole raiding parties, whose movements along the St. Marys River could be observed from the site. Burnsed used it as a residence for his family as well.

The blockhouse was constructed with fine craftsmanship, as indicated by the precision fit of the squared hewn logs and their full-dovetail joinery. Burnsed supposedly stood on his head at the roof ridge of the building after its completion. The structure was built entirely of local yellow pine, and had openings from which to fire rifles. Some of the logs were partly cut through to create knock-out sections to serve as gun ports, but they were never knocked out for use. Holes were also drilled into them to accommodate dowels for weaving the warp of hand-woven cloth.

The structure was supported by trapezoidal wooden piers resting on sleepers. All boards were laid flush horizontally, and the corner joints are full dovetail. The doors are batten style, with two on the front of the house leading onto a porch, which has a pent roof. The windows were placed high in the walls of the original portion of the building and consist of square or long rectangular openings with hinged board single shutters. The house is two stories high; only the lower storey was lived in. The back porch connects the dining area with the kitchen in an outbuilding in the rear. There was log smoke house located across the yard from the kitchen and a log corn crib across the lane in front of the house, the house also had a split rail fence in front.

Legal records on file in Baker County indicate that the property passed through the ownership of five families successively after it was deeded by the State of Florida in 1863. Legal documentation prior to this date is unavailable. The house is also known as the Carl Brown House because it was occupied by the Hugh and G. Carl Brown families from c. 1881 to 1950; Carl Brown's family were thought to be its last occupants, but in fact the family of Lemmie and Lottie Bennett were the last occupants according to his daughter Dorothy "Debbie" Bennett Finley, ( the oldest of eleven children) who lived there until she married in 1966 and his granddaughter, Deborah Finley Johnson who spent many weekends visiting her grandparents in the house, the upper storey of the house actually served as bedroom for a guest or one of the eleven Bennett children. Restoration was begun by the Durable Restoration Company of Columbus, Ohio in January 2007.
