= Olustee, Florida =

- Unincorporated area
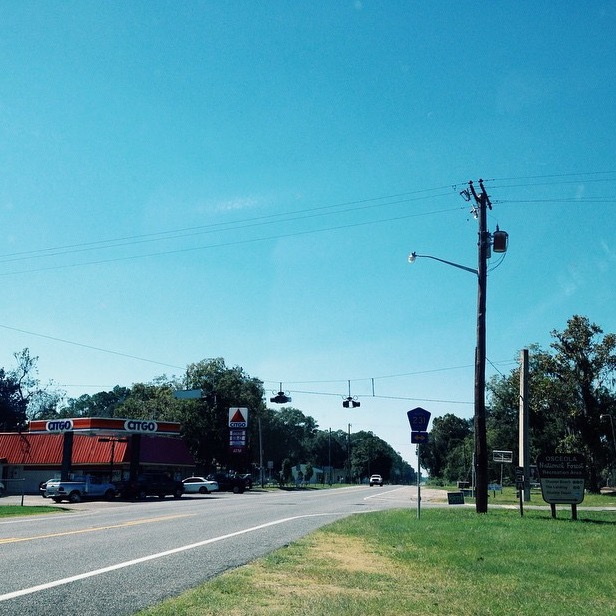
- U.S. Route 90

- Location within Florida
- Coordinates: 30°12′15″N 82°25′43″W
- Country: United States
- State: Florida
- County: Baker
- Elevation: 161 ft (49 m)
- Time zone: UTC-5 (Eastern (EST))
  - Summer (DST): UTC-4 (EDT)
- Area code: 904
- GNIS feature ID: 306156

Olustee is an unincorporated area in Baker County, Florida, United States. The name "Olustee" is from the nearby Olustee Creek whose name derives from the Creek (Muscogee) language ue-lvste (/oy-lást-i/) meaning "black water". The town was historically known as Olustee Station and is the location of the Olustee Battlefield Historic State Park as the town is most known for the 1864 battle of Olustee and of the ranger station for the Osceola National Forest, which is headquartered there. The US Forest Service has restored the former railroad depot at the center of town as a visitor center and museum for forest visitors.
