= Glen Saint Mary Nurseries Company =

- U.S. National Register of Historic Places
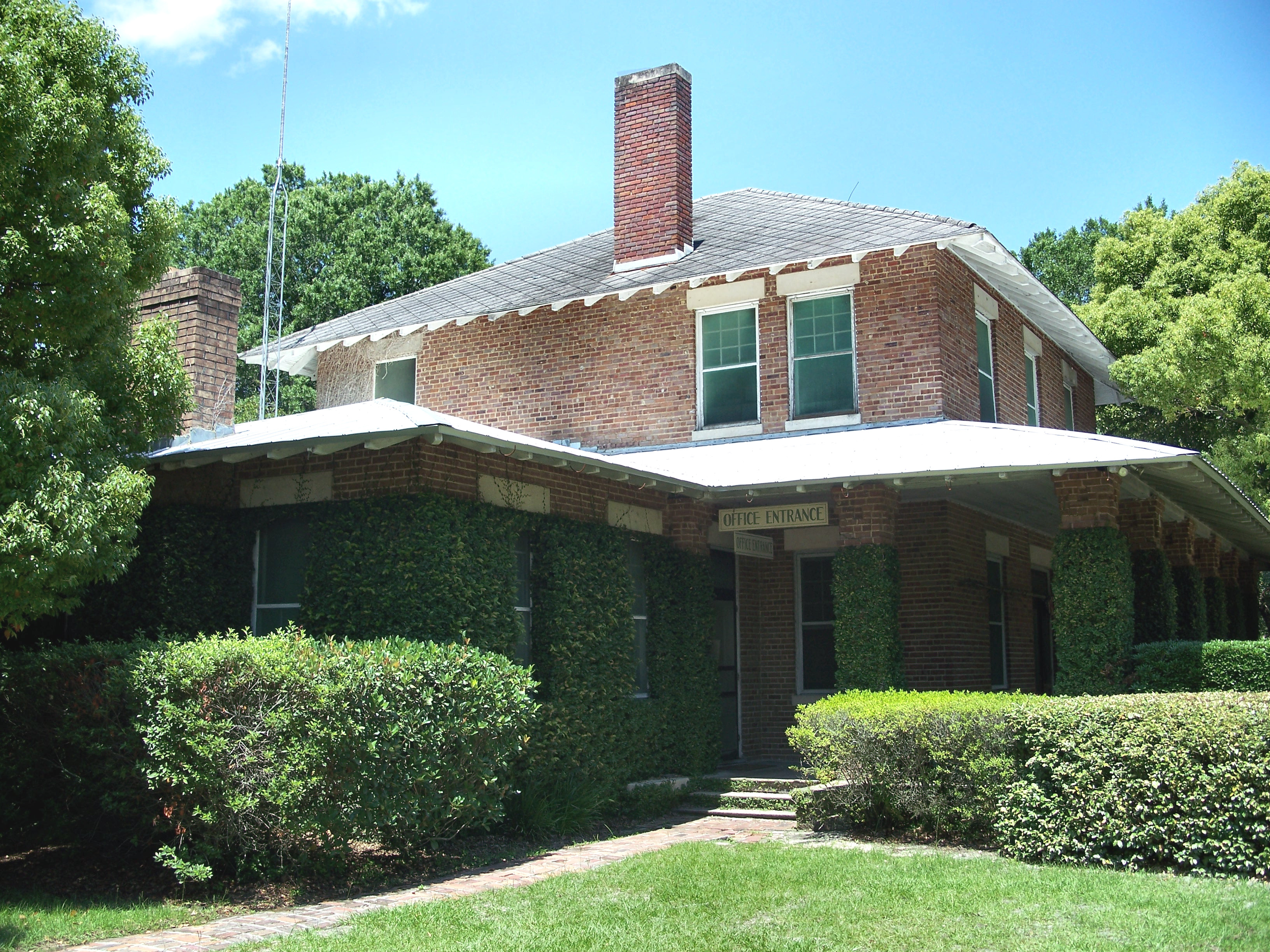

- Location within Florida Location within the United States
- Location: Glen St. Mary, Florida
- Coordinates: 30°15′12″N 82°10′31″W
- NRHP reference No.: 03001111
- Added to NRHP: November 7, 2003

The Glen Saint Mary Nurseries Company is a historic site in Glen St. Mary, Florida, located at 7703 Glen Nursery Road. On November 7, 2003, it was added to the U.S. National Register of Historic Places. Glen Saint Mary Nurseries was founded by George Taber Sr. in 1882. The business began as a cattle and potato farm, but soon its focus shifted to peaches and other fruits and plants. After the devastating freezes of 1894–95, Mr. Taber began experimenting with freeze-resistant citruses such as kumquats, satsumas, and other hardy orange varieties. Within two decades, the nursery had become one of the leading citrus producers in the country. The nursery incorporated in 1907 as the Glen Saint Mary Nurseries Company and continued to expand, eventually covering over a thousand acres between its several Florida locations. It has since become a wholesale nursery, with products including hollies, azaleas, roses, and cephalotaxus. The nursery is most renowned for the George Taber Azalea, a pink and white flowering bush which was introduced in 1929. Taber azaleas can be found in nurseries and gardens across the country, as well as the in National Arboretum's azalea garden and on the grounds of the U.S. Capitol.
