= Olustee Battlefield Historic State Park =

Park in Florida, USA

Olustee Battlefield
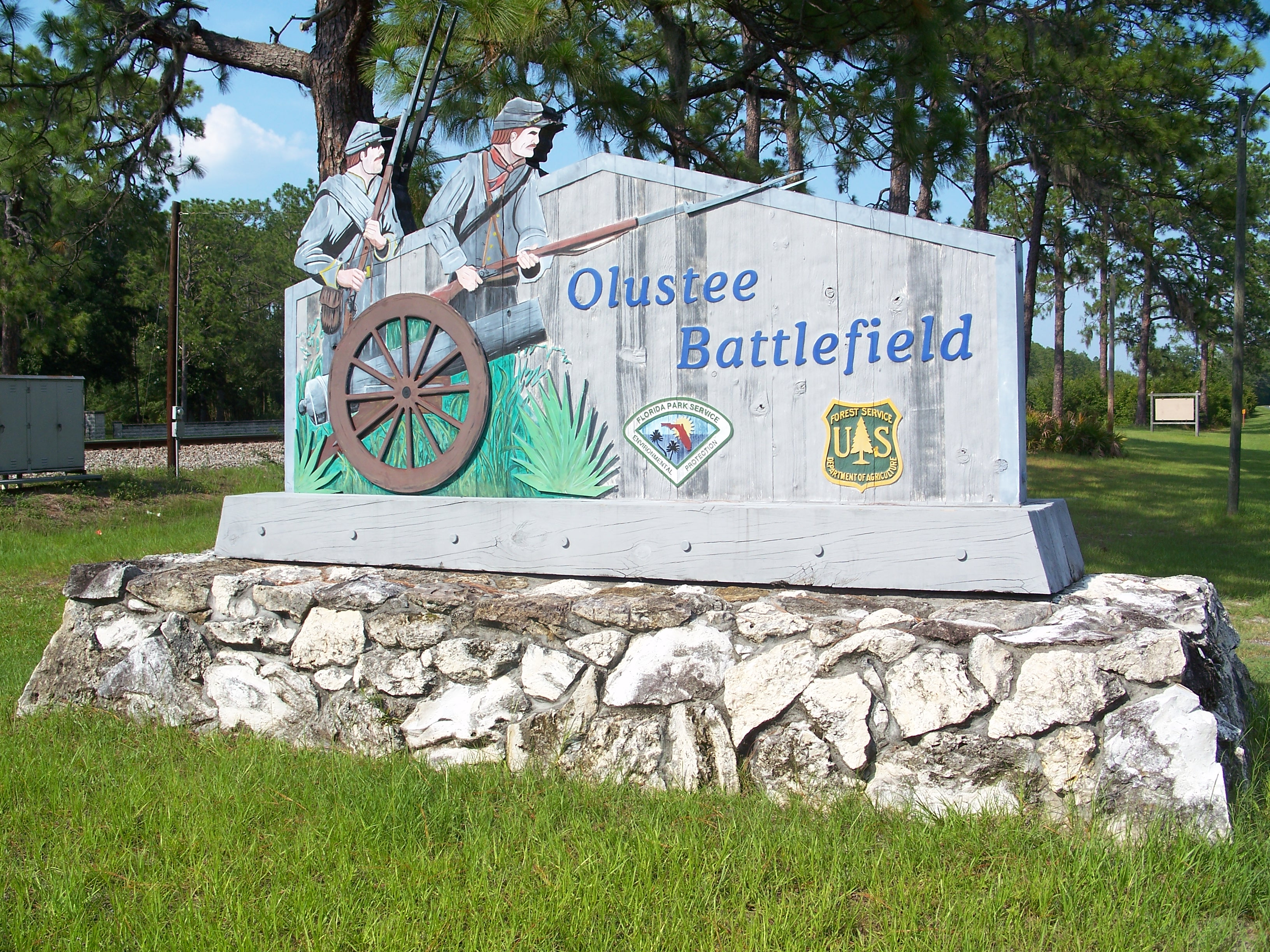
- A view of the park's sign

- Location within Florida Location within the United States
- Interactive map of Olustee Battlefield
- Location: Baker County, Florida, USA
- Nearest city: Olustee, Florida
- Coordinates: 30°12′44″N 82°23′20″W
- Established: 12 August 1970
- Governing body: Florida Department of Environmental Protection
- Olustee Battlefield
- U.S. National Register of Historic Places
- NRHP reference No.: 70000177
- Added to NRHP: 12 August 1970

Olustee Battlefield Historic State Park is a Florida State Park in the Osceola National Forest, near the town of Olustee. The site of Florida's largest Civil War battle, the Battle of Olustee, the park is located 50 miles (80 km) west of Jacksonville and 15 miles (24 km) east of Lake City, on U.S. 90. It was one of the first parks in the Florida State Park system.

The State of Florida actually owns only 3.09 acres (12,500 m^{2}) of the Park, but manages another 688 acres (2.78 km^{2}) of the original battlefield under a Special Use Permit from the United States Forest Service.

Under the title of Olustee Battlefield, it was added to the U.S. National Register of Historic Places on 12 August 1970.

== History ==
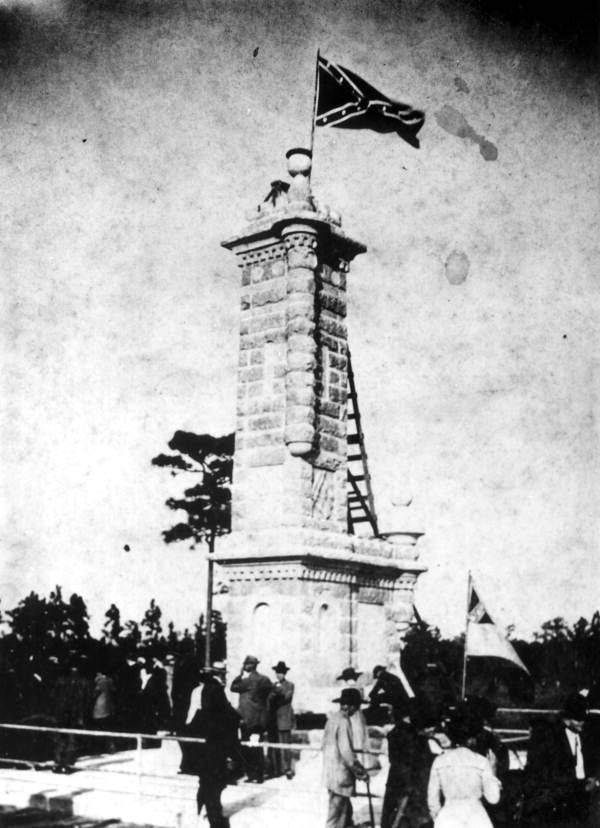
Survivors of the Battle of Olustee at the monument dedication on October 23, 1912.

The Battle of Olustee was fought on the afternoon of 20 February 1864. It is recreated annually during that month by Civil War reenactors.

In 1897, the Florida Division of the United Daughters of the Confederacy (UDC) began raising funds to place a monument at the battle site. Two years later, the Florida Legislature appropriated $2,500.00 and established a commission to oversee construction of the monument. The project was completed in 1912, and the monument was officially dedicated on 23 October 1912. The UDC administered the Olustee Battlefield Memorial until 1949, when the Florida Board of Parks and Historic Memorials assumed responsibility. Today the Olustee Battlefield Historic State Park is administered by the Florida Department of Environmental Protection, Division of Recreation and Parks.

== Recreational activities ==
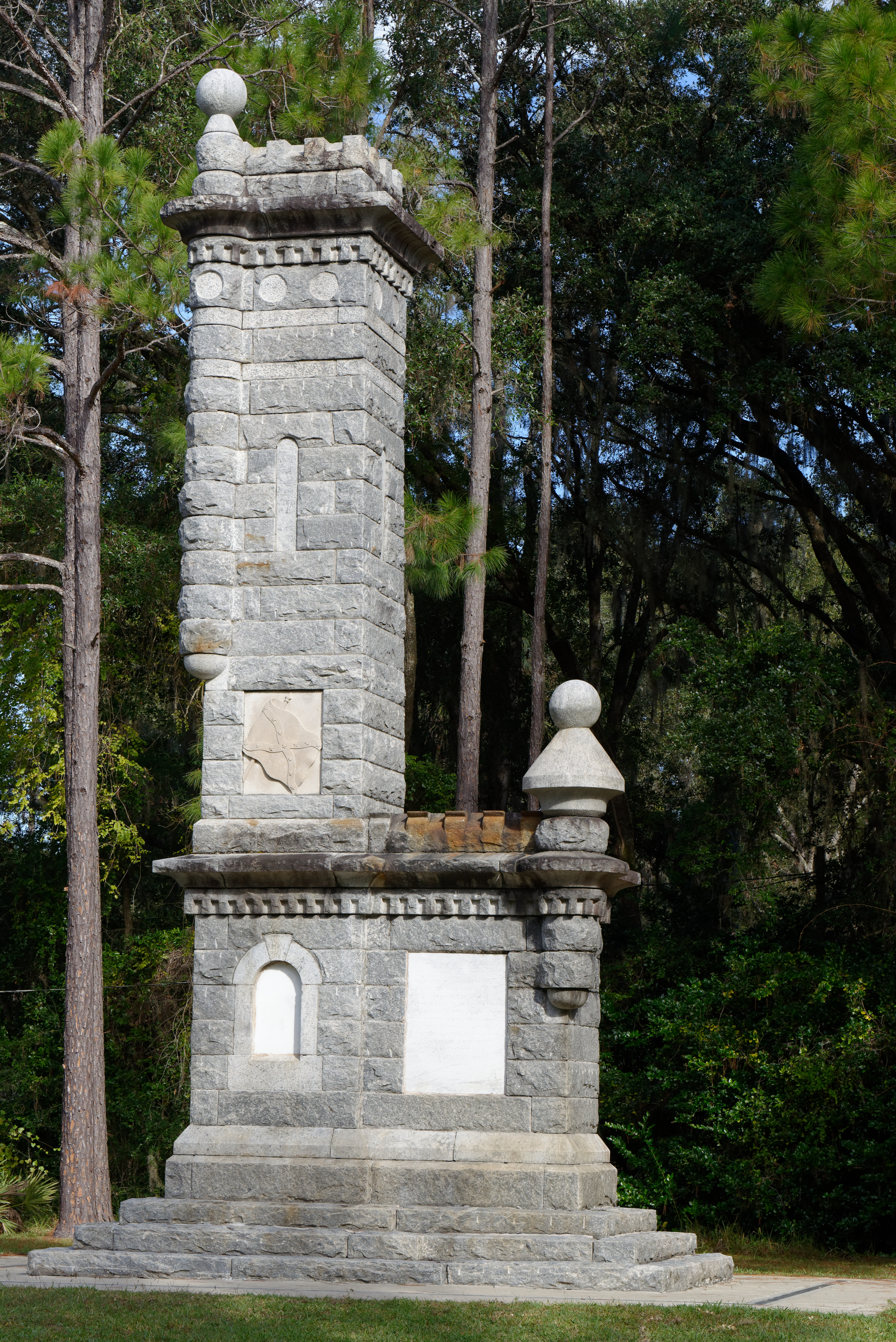
The monument

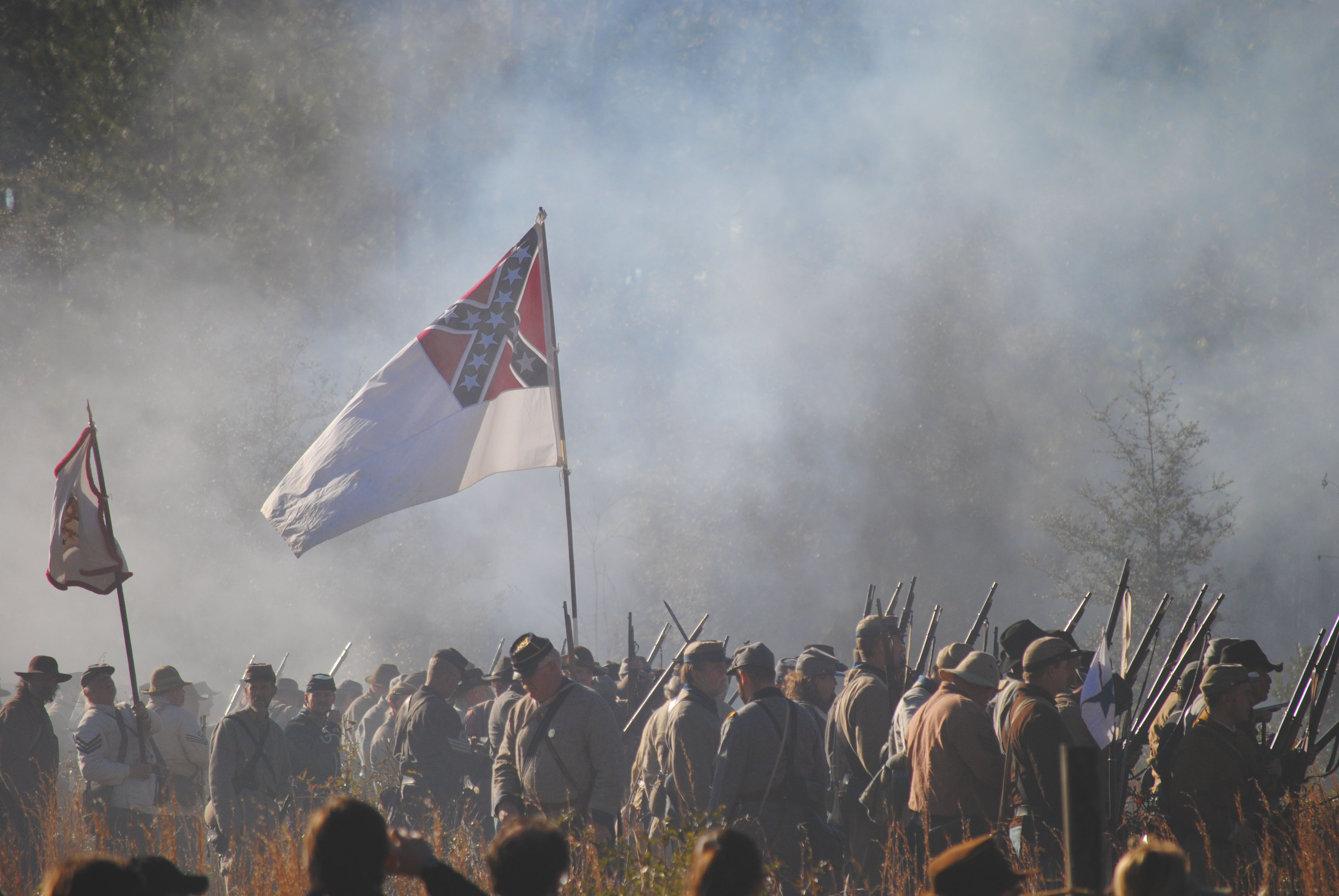
The Battle of Olustee reenactment on the 150th anniversary.

Year-round park activities include hiking, picnicking, and viewing interpretive displays. Amenities include a one-mile (1.6 km) hiking trail with interpretive displays, picnic tables and a small interpretive center about the battle. In addition, the Florida Trail goes through the Historic Site, with the Olustee Trailhead close to the main entrance on U.S. 90.

The park has a very active Citizen Support Organization of volunteers who put on an annual reenactment. On Presidents' Day weekend each February (see Notes), thousands of reenactors from across the U.S. and even from overseas come to the Park to reenact the Battle of Olustee. Reenactors begin arriving as early as Thursday to set up. Friday is designated "School Day" as thousands of students arrive to spend the day watching demonstrations and listening to living historians discuss various aspects of the war and as well as life in the United States during the 1860s. The public is invited to attend on Friday (no battle reenactment), and on Saturday and Sunday. On all three days visitors can tour the camps, view demonstrations, interact with living historians, shop at numerous sutler tents for authentic Civil War merchandise, and attend the battles reenacted on Saturday and Sunday only. A large selection of modern-day food is continuously available from Friday through Sunday at the park.

== Hours ==
The park is open between 9:00 AM and 5:00 PM every day.
