= Osceola National Forest =

National forest located Florida

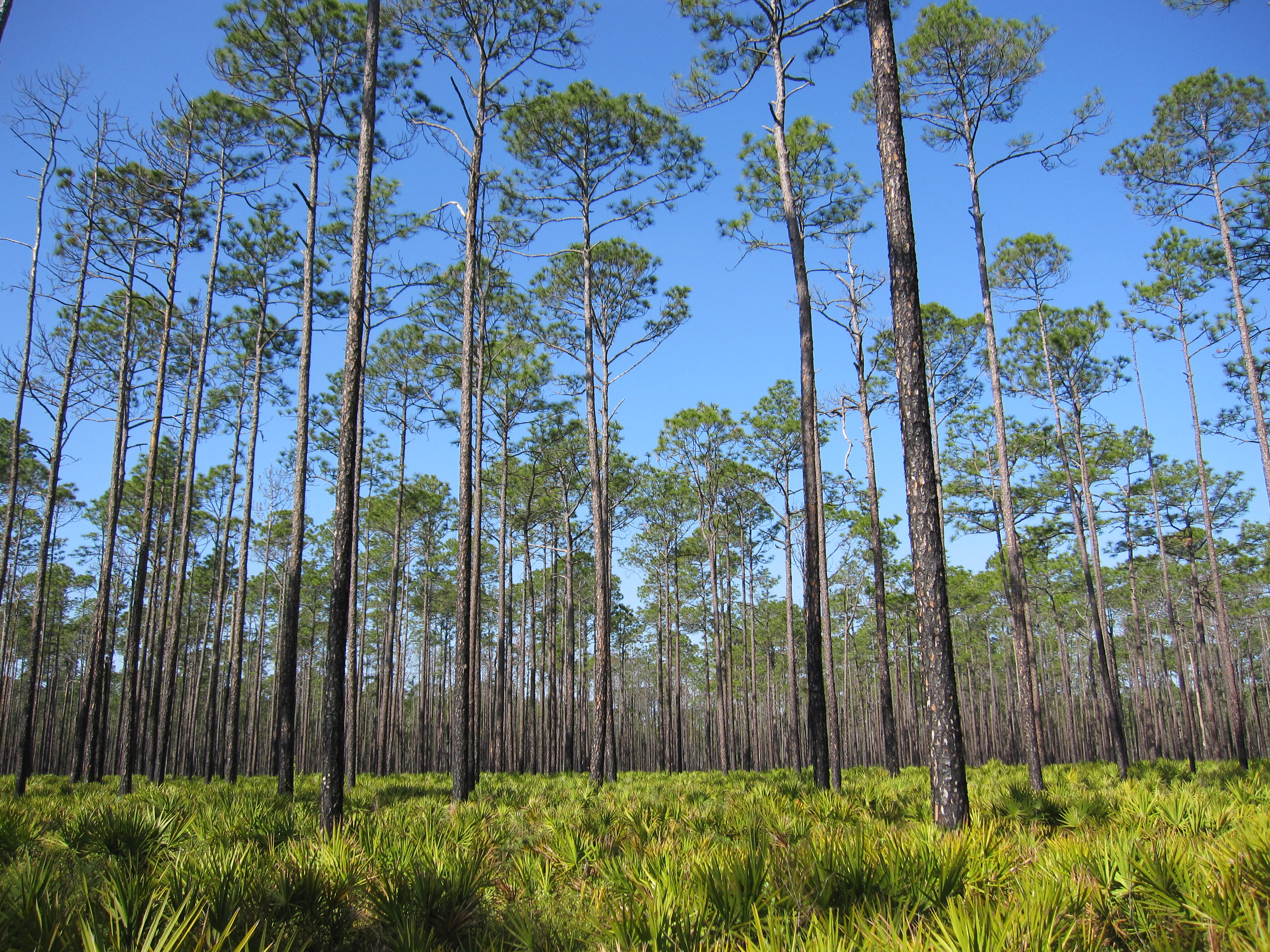

- Location within the United States
- Location: Florida, United States
- Nearest city: Olustee, FL
- Coordinates: 30°17′26″N 82°19′18″W
- Area: 190,932 acres (772.67 km^{2})
- Max. elevation: 198 ft. (60 m): 30.1910, -82.5915
- Established: July 10, 1931
- Governing body: U.S. Forest Service
- Website: Osceola National Forest

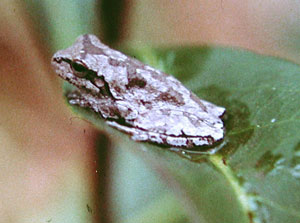
A pine woods tree frog in the Osceola National Forest

Highway sign warning drivers to watch for bears crossing Interstate 10 through the Osceola National Forest

Osceola National Forest is a National Forest located in northeast Florida. It is named in honor of the noted Seminole warrior, Osceola. The forest also has a history of Native American presence, in which they inhabited and traveled through this area. Osceola National Forest was created by President Herbert Hoover's proclamation on July 10, 1931.

The forest is made up of approximately 200,000 acres (810 km^{2}) of pine flatwoods and cypress-hardwood swamps in northeastern Florida, and is about 50 miles (80 km) west of Jacksonville. It is located in parts of Columbia, Baker, Bradford, and Hamilton counties. The forest administration headquarters are in Tallahassee, as are all three National Forests in Florida. Local ranger district offices are located in Olustee. There is one officially designated wilderness area in the forest, the 13,660 acres (55.3 km^{2}) Big Gum Swamp Wilderness.

== Geography and ecology ==
Within the forest is the Osceola Research Natural Area, designated a National Natural Landmark in December 1974.

Osceola National Forest has a history of wildfires, and is susceptible to wildfires with prescribed burns in place to mitigate this risk and lower tree mortality. An example of a threatening wildfire in the past is in June 1941, in which it took 600 fire fighters to fight a fire that spread along 15 miles.

Osceola National Forest is home to many birds as well as mammalian and reptilian species, including the alligator, eastern indigo snake, two species of skunk, muskrat, black bear, coyote, raccoon, gopher tortoise, bobcat, two species of fox, opossum, cougar, fox squirrel, and red-cockaded woodpecker an endangered species. Osceola National Forest has also had sightings of ant leptothorax within its land.

== Activities ==
A 28-mile (45 km) section of the Florida National Scenic Trail is included in the park grounds. Other hiking trails in the park include: Olustee Battlefield Trail (an American Civil War battlefield), Trampled Track Trail, and Mt. Carrie Trail. Two horseback riding trails pass through open pine flatwoods and near scenic bays. The park is also open to hunters and fishermen with permits.

== Campsites ==
- Ocean Pond Campground - Ocean Pond Campground is located on the north side of Ocean Pond, a 1,760-acre (7.1 km^{2}) natural lake. Sixty-seven campsites are available for tents, trailers, or motor homes. Ocean Pond provides a variety of recreational experiences such as fishing, boating, water skiing and camping. A beach area, boat ramp, drinking water, hot showers, and flush toilets are located in the campground.
- The Landing Group Area - Available by reservation only, this is a 50-person private group area. Recreational activities include swimming, boating, camping, and picnicking. Facilities include a sand beach, boat launch for small boats, picnic shelter, large group grill, and restrooms with showers.
- Hunt Camps - Hunt camps include Hog Pen Landing, Cobb, Wiggins, West Tower, and East Tower. These are primitive camp sites.

== See also ==
- List of national forests of the United States
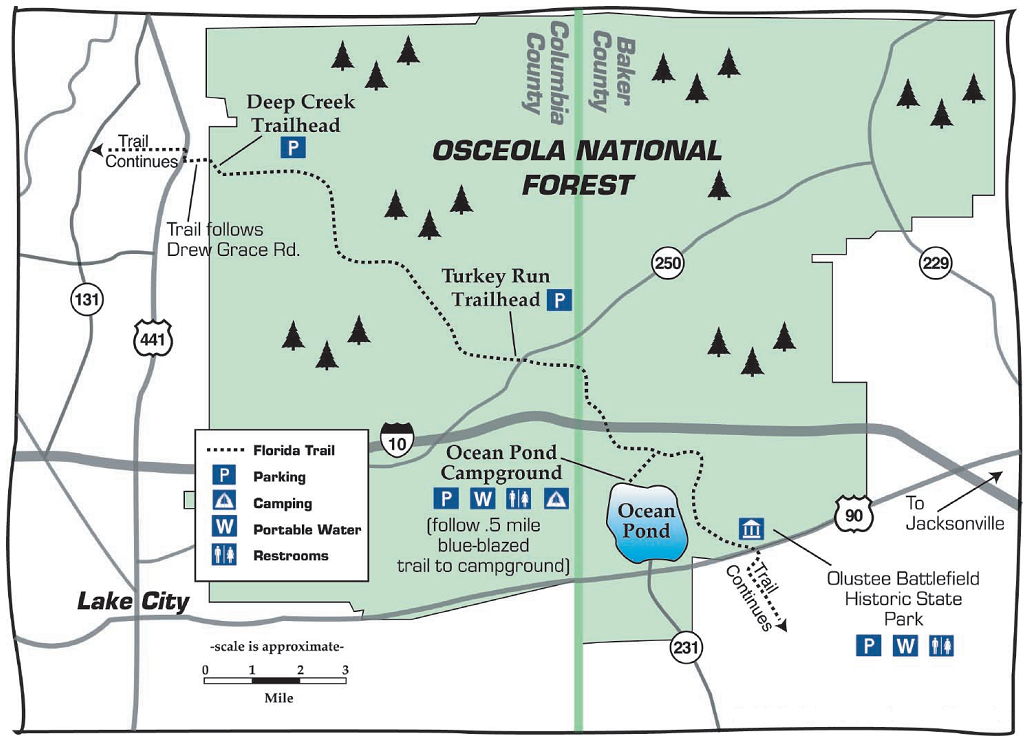
- Map of Osceola National Forest and including landmarks such as trails and campgrounds
  Apalachicola National Forest
- Ocala National Forest
- Olustee Battlefield Historic State Park is within Osceola National Forest
