= Old Baker County Courthouse =

- U.S. National Register of Historic Places
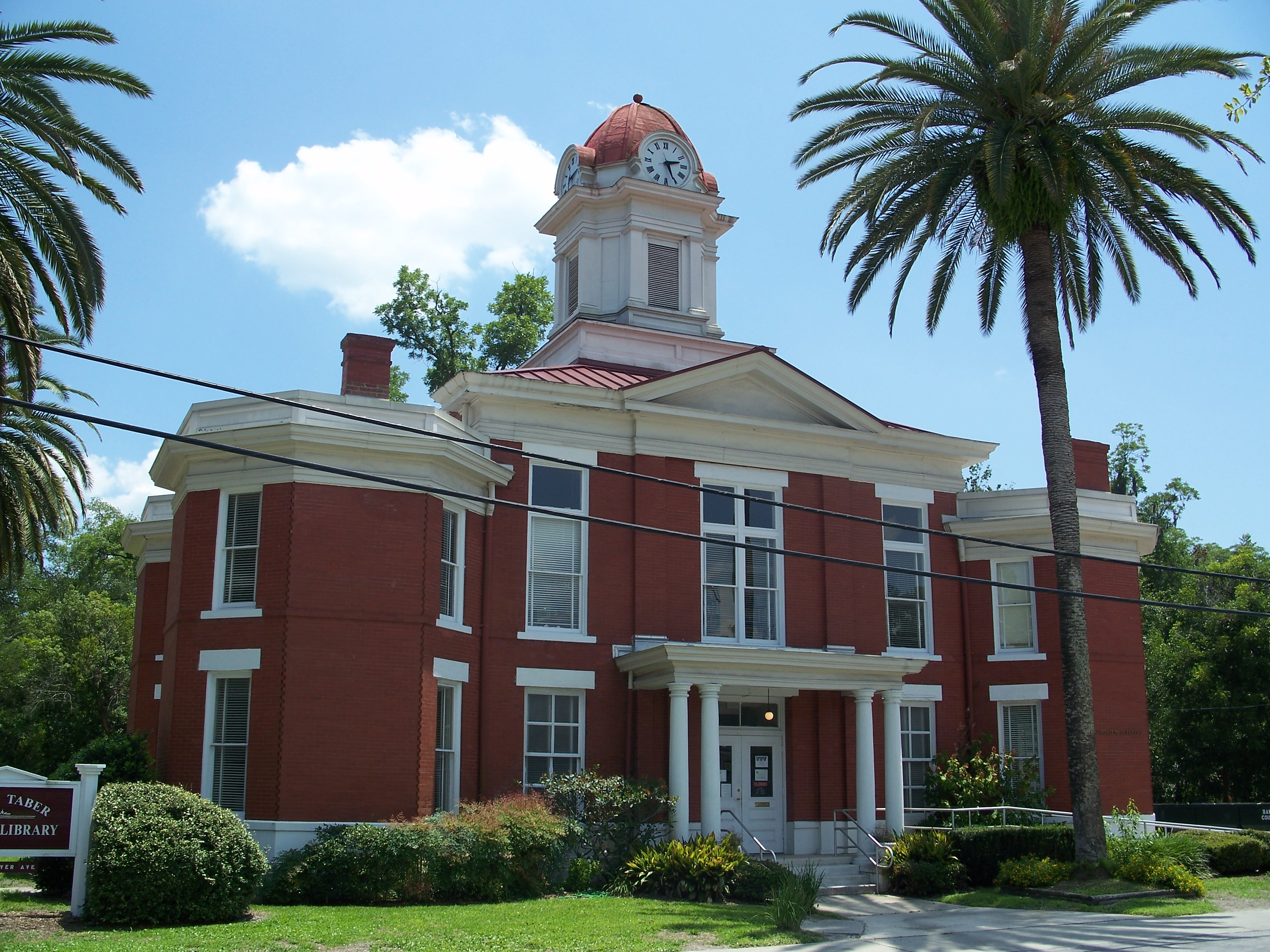
- Old Baker County Courthouse

- Location within Florida Location within the United States
- Interactive map showing the location of Old Baker County Courthouse
- Location: Macclenny, Florida
- Coordinates: 30°16′48″N 82°7′20″W
- Built: 1908
- Architect: Edward Columbus Hosford
- Architectural style: Colonial Revival
- NRHP reference No.: 86001729
- Added to NRHP: August 21, 1986

The Old Baker County Courthouse, now the Emily Taber Public Library, was built in 1908. It is at 14 McIver Avenue West in Macclenny, Florida. It was designed by Edward Columbus Hosford of Eastman, Georgia. In 1986 it was added to the U.S. National Register of Historic Places.

It was deemed "significant for its architecture and its association with architect Edward C. Hosford, who was responsible for designing a number of county courthouses in both Florida and Georgia during the 1906-1910 period. Built in the 'up-to-date' eclectic Colonial Revival style, the structure represented the pride of the county's citizens in the evolution of the local economy from subsistence farms to one based on commercial exploitation of agriculture."

It has also been known as the Baker County Free Public Library and the Peg McCollum Building.
