= Macclenny, Florida =

Macclenny, Florida McClenny Florida
- City
- City of Macclenny
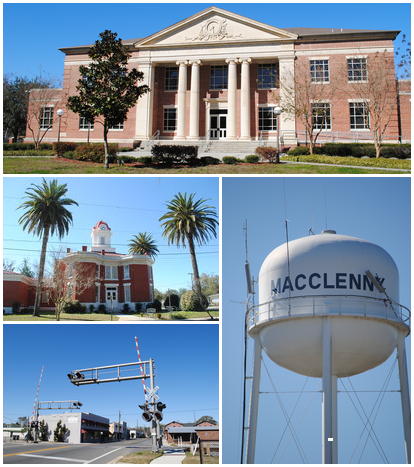
- Top, left to right: Baker County Courthouse, Old Baker County Courthouse, railroad crossing in the historic district, water tower
- Nickname: Baker County's Medium size City
- Location in Baker County and the state of Florida
- Coordinates: 30°16′45″N 82°07′14″W
- Country: United States
- State: Florida
- County: Baker
- Settled: 1829
- Incorporated: 1939

Government
  - Type: Commission–Manager

Area
  - Total: 4.86 sq mi (12.60 km^{2})
  - Land: 4.86 sq mi (12.60 km^{2})
  - Water: 0 sq mi (0.00 km^{2})
- Elevation: 131 ft (40 m)

Population (2020)
  - Total: 7,304
  - Density: 1,501.1/sq mi (579.57/km^{2})
- Time zone: UTC-5 (Eastern (EST))
  - Summer (DST): UTC-4 (EDT)
- ZIP code: 32063
- Area code(s): 904, 324
- FIPS code: 12-41950
- GNIS feature ID: 2404984
- Website: www.cityofmacclenny.com

Macclenny is a city and the county seat of Baker County, Florida. Located just west of Jacksonville, it is part of the Jacksonville, Florida Metropolitan Statistical Area. The population was 7,304 at the 2020 census, up from 6,374 in 2010.

== History ==
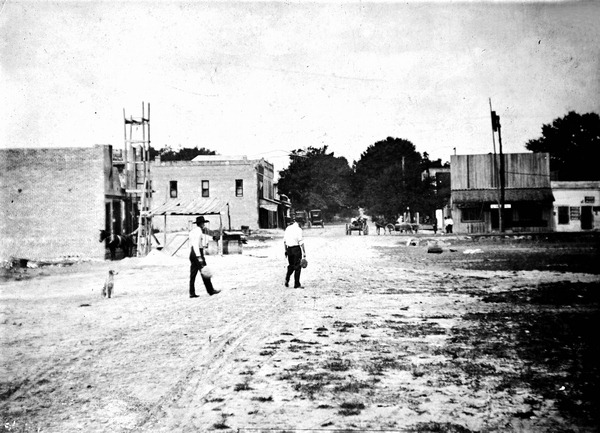
Fifth Street looking north in Macclenny, circa 1908.

Macclenny was first called Darbyville because most of the land of this area was owned by the Darby family. Carr Bowers McClenny married into the Darby family, and then bought most of this land in the late 19th century, intending to harvest it for timber.

The town was later renamed McClenny after Carr Bowers McClenny. He established lumber-related businesses, including wood harvesting, sawmills to process it, turpentine, and land. The town name McClenny was changed to the current name of The City of Macclenny because the post office department had a rule against using capital letters in the middle of a name. The first post office in Macclenny was established in 1890.

There were settlers in Macclenny as early as 1829, but it was not until after the Civil War that more people began to settle there. In 1888, most of the town residents were killed in a yellow fever epidemic. The population was 334 in 1890, and the town gradually recovered.

== Geography ==
Macclenny is located in eastern Baker County 28 miles (45 km) west of downtown Jacksonville. U.S. Route 90 (Macclenny Avenue) runs through the center of town, and Interstate 10 passes through the southern tip of the town, with access from Exit 335 (State Road 121) & Exit 336 (State Road 228) Lake City is 32 miles (51 km) to the west, and the Florida–Georgia border is 6 miles (10 km) to the north.

According to the United States Census Bureau, the city has a total area of 4.7 square miles (12.3 km^{2}), all land.

== Demographics ==
Historical population
Census	Pop.	Note	%±
1890	334		—
1900	350		4.8%
1910	388		10.9%
1920	350		−9.8%
1930	519		48.3%
1940	771		48.6%
1950	1,177		52.7%
1960	2,671		126.9%
1970	2,733		2.3%
1980	3,851		40.9%
1990	3,966		3.0%
2000	4,459		12.4%
2010	6,374		42.9%
2020	7,304		14.6%
U.S. Decennial Census

=== Racial and ethnic composition ===
Macclenny racial composition (Hispanics excluded from racial categories) (NH = Non-Hispanic)
Race	Pop 2010	Pop 2020	% 2010	% 2020
White (NH)	4,877	4,984	76.51%	68.24%
Black or African American (NH)	1,135	1,449	17.81%	19.84%
Native American or Alaska Native (NH)	28	25	0.44%	0.34%
Asian (NH)	43	81	0.67%	1.11%
Pacific Islander or Native Hawaiian (NH)	1	4	0.02%	0.05%
Some other race (NH)	4	22	0.06%	0.30%
Two or more races/Multiracial (NH)	127	286	1.99%	3.92%
Hispanic or Latino (any race)	159	453	2.49%	6.20%
Total	6,374	7,304		

=== 2020 census ===
As of the 2020 census, Macclenny had a population of 7,304. The median age was 34.4 years. 27.6% of residents were under the age of 18 and 14.0% of residents were 65 years of age or older. For every 100 females, there were 98.8 males, and for every 100 females age 18 and over, there were 95.6 males age 18 and over.

98.4% of residents lived in urban areas, while 1.6% lived in rural areas.

There were 2,368 households in Macclenny, of which 42.1% had children under the age of 18 living in them. Of all households, 44.6% were married-couple households, 14.7% were households with a male householder and no spouse or partner present, and 33.7% were households with a female householder and no spouse or partner present. About 21.9% of all households were made up of individuals and 10.6% had someone living alone who was 65 years of age or older. In 2020, 1,447 families resided in the city.

There were 2,496 housing units, of which 5.1% were vacant. The homeowner vacancy rate was 1.1% and the rental vacancy rate was 4.2%.

=== 2010 census ===
As of the 2010 United States census, there were 6,374 people, 2,300 households, and 1,588 families residing in the city.

=== 2000 census ===
At the 2000 census there were 4,459 people in 1,548 households, including 1,140 families, in the city. The population density was 1,354.9 inhabitants per square mile (523.1/km^{2}). There were 1,644 housing units at an average density of 499.5 units per square mile (192.9 units/km^{2}). The racial makeup of the city was 75.89% White, 21.87% African American, 0.36% Native American, 0.67% Asian, 0.07% Pacific Islander, 0.45% from other races, and 0.70% from two or more races. Hispanic or Latino of any race were 2.47%.

Of the 1,548 households in 2000, 38.4% had children under the age of 18 living with them, 49.5% were married couples living together, 20.5% had a female householder with no husband present, and 26.3% were non-families. 23.0% of households were one person and 10.7% were one person aged 65 or older. The average household size was 2.70 and the average family size was 3.17.

In 2000, the age distribution was 28.9% under the age of 18, 12.4% from 18 to 24, 25.5% from 25 to 44, 18.8% from 45 to 64, and 14.4% 65 or older. The median age was 32 years. For every 100 females, there were 90 males. For every 100 females age 18 and over, there were 85 males.

In 2000, the median household income was $31,895 and the median family income was $37,091. Males had a median income of $26,775 versus $19,573 for females. The per capita income for the city was $14,909. About 17.1% of families and 20.9% of the population were below the poverty line, including 37.4% of those under age 18 and 10.2% of those age 65 or over.
