= Battle of Olustee order of battle: Union =

The following Union Army units and commanders fought in the Battle of Olustee of the American Civil War. The Confederate order of battle is listed separately.

== Rank abbreviations ==
- BG = Brigadier general
- Col = Colonel
- Ltc = Lieutenant colonel
- Maj = Major
- Cpt = Captain
- Lt = Lieutenant

== District of Florida ==
BG Truman Seymour

Brigade	Regiments, battalions and batteries
Barton's Brigade Col William B. Barton	47th New York: Col Henry Moore - 40 killed, 13 died of wounds, 184 wounded and 76 missing; 48th New York: Maj William B. Coan - 31 killed, 10 died of wounds, 144 wounded and 22 missing; 115th New York: Col Simeon Sammon - 42 killed, 20 died of wounds, 188 wounded and 46 missing
Hawley's Brigade Col Joseph R. Hawley	7th Connecticut (barely 300 men): Cpt Benjamin F. Skinner; 7th New Hampshire: Col Joseph C. Abbott - 15 killed, 104 wounded and 90 missing; 8th United States Colored Troops (21 officers and 544 men): Col Charles W. Fribley - 66 killed, 50 wounded and missing; 212 wounded, 15 missing
Montgomery's Brigade Col James Montgomery	35th U.S. Colored Troops: Ltc William N. Reed (died six days later of wounds suffered in the battle), Maj Archibald Bogle; 54th Massachusetts Infantry (colored) (13 officers and 497 men from companies B, C, D, F, G, H, I and K): Col Edward Needles Hallowell - 13 killed, 66 wounded, 8 missing
Cavalry Brigade Col Guy V. Henry	40th Massachusetts Mounted Infantry: Col Guy V. Henry; Independent Massachusetts Cavalry Battalion: Maj Atherton A. Stevens, Jr.; Battery B (Horse Artillery), 1st U.S. Artillery (4 pieces): Cpt Samuel S. Elder
Artillery Cpt John Hamilton	Battery E, 3rd U.S. Artillery (6 pieces): Cpt John Hamilton; Battery M, 1st U.S. Artillery (6 pieces): Cpt Loomis L. Langdon; Battery C, 3rd Rhode Island Heavy Artillery: Lt Henry H. Metcalf
Engineers	1st New York Engineers: Maj James Place - 5 killed and 2 wounded
