= Battle of Olustee order of battle =

The order of battle for the Battle of Olustee includes:

- Battle of Olustee order of battle: Confederate
- Battle of Olustee order of battle: Union
