= 40th Massachusetts Infantry Regiment =

40th Regiment, Massachusetts Volunteer Infantry
- Active: August 22, 1862 – June 30, 1865
- Country: United States of America
- Allegiance: Union
- Branch: Infantry
- Engagements: Siege of Suffolk: Second Battle of Charleston Harbor; Battle of Olustee; Battle of Cedar Creek; Bermuda Hundred Campaign; Battle of Proctor's Creek; Battle of Cold Harbor; Siege of Petersburg

The 40th Massachusetts Infantry Regiment was a three-year infantry regiment of the Union Army that served in the Department of Virginia and North Carolina, the Army of the Potomac, and the Department of the South during the American Civil War.

== Service ==
The 40th Massachusetts Infantry was organized at the old militia training camp, renamed Camp Stanton, in Lynnfield, Massachusetts in response to Lincoln's 4 July 1862 call for 300,00 men to serve for three years. On 7 July, Governor Andrew issued General Order 26 which clarified that the Commonwealth's quota for this call was 15,000 men and broke the quota down by cities and towns. As the Commonwealth was already in the process of recruiting and training thee 32nd, 33rd, and 34th, the Adjutant General decided to add the 36th, 37th, 38th, 39th, and 40th to the commitment. In addition to the new regiments, 4,000 men were recruited to reinforce Massachusetts regiments already on active service.

The 40th began training in Lynnfield in August 1862, and mustered for a three-year enlistment by companies between 22 August, and 5 September 1862. Major Burr Porter of New Jersey, a regular officer who had served on Fremont's staff was appointed commander of the regiment and promoted to colonel. He would not join the regiment until they reached Washington DC. In his stead, Lieutenant Colonel Joseph A. Dalton, a seasoned militia officer took command at Stanton and led it as it left Massachusetts on 8 September by train, arriving in Washington on the night of 11 September where Burr took command.

=== Defense of Washington ===
The regiment arrived at Fort Ethan Allen across the Potomac from the Capitol on 12 September 1862. It remained manning the defenses of Washington DC, under the operational and administrative control of the 2nd Brigade, Abercrombie's Division, Military District of Washington, until February 1863. This time was relatively uneventful for the regiment save for the response to a raid on 28 December by Stuart's rebel cavalry where they arrived only in time to capture a small number of the cavalry's rear guard. The regiment remained in the defenses south of Washington through the winter and early spring of 1863. On 2 February, the forces defending Washington were reorganized into the XXII Corps. The 40th was assigned to the 2nd Brigade of Abercrombie's Division. On 4 March COL Porter took over command of the brigade and the experienced militia man, Dalton, took command of the 40th.

=== Operations in Tidewater ===
In response to Lt. Gen. Longstreet's Siege of Suffolk, The 2nd Brigade was detached on 15 April 1863, from XXII Corps and sailed down the Potomac to Hampton Roads as part of the relief force. Arriving at midnight on the 17th, the 40th and its brigade became 1st Brigade, 3rd Division, VII Corps, Department of Virginia. After Longstreet lifted the siege to rejoin Lee, the 40th moved across the James to Newport News where it remained for the remainder of May.

Remaining in the Tidewater Virginia during the Gettysburg campaign, the regiment and the corps skirmished regularly with rebel forces keeping it under observation. On 1 July, the Corps raided toward Richmond. While the Army of the Potomac was engaged on its left on 2 July in Pennsylvania, the 40th's sharp repulse of a cavalry raid in force averted a disaster on the raid. After nearing to within fifteen miles of Richmond, the force returned to its positions near Yorktown as the Army of Northern Virginia retreated across the Potomac pursued by Meade.

Traveling by boat and rail, the brigade left the peninsula and joined the Army of the Potomac in Frederick, Maryland. The brigade was broken up as the 40th's brethren regiments were nine-month volunteers and had reached the end of their enlistments. The regiment was temporarily assigned to the 2nd Brigade, 1st Division, XI Corps, Army of the Potomac, until August 1863. With XI Corps, the 40th joined the pursuit of Lee through the end of July.

=== Siege of Charleston ===
On 7 August, the regiment was embarked for Folly Island south of Charleston, South Carolina. Arriving 13 August, it joined BG Adelbert Ames' 2nd Brigade, BG George H. Gordon's South End of Folly Island Division, MG Quincy A. Gillmore's X Corps, Department of the South. It went up the beach to the trenches in front of Fort Wagner on 15 August where the regiment remained until the attrition inflicted on the defenders forced them out on the night of 6 September.

=== Jacksonville Expedition ===
The 40th remained in the forces besieging Charleston until 16 January 1864 when relocated to Hilton Head, South Carolina, on 18 January. On the island, the regiment joined the 2nd Battalion, 4th Massachusetts Volunteer Cavalry Regiment (operating as the Independent Massachusetts Cavalry Battalion), and Battery B (Horse Artillery), 1st U.S. Artillery to form the Light Brigade attached to BGEN Truman Seymour's Jacksonville Expedition forces. The 40th received horses and cavalry equipment and drilled as mounted infantry until its embarkation for Jacksonville on 4 February.

Landing in the Union enclave in Jacksonville, the brigade started roaming the countryside. During Seymour's expedition, the Light Brigade's duties were the usual of a cavalry force with the added weight of a battery and infantry command. On 15 February, a detachment of the 40th captured Gainesville for several hours and brought away a large amount of war supplies before rejoining the Union forces. During the defeat at the Battle of Olustee the Light Brigade protected both Union flanks and screened the force on its retreat to Jacksonville. A member of the 1st Georgia Infantry Regiment, which faced against the 40th during the battle, noted that, because the regiment was armed with repeating rifles, they were difficult to attack because "they seemed to load with marvelous speed." The regiment also repulsed rebel attempts on 1 March at the Battle of Cedar Creek and kept them out of the outskirts of Jacksonville until the expedition re-embarked on 22 March.

=== Army of the James ===
Arriving back in the Yorktown area 28 March 1864, the regiment turned in its horses and cavalry equipment and reverted to infantry. General Butler, at Grant's direction was organizing the Army of the James. The regiment was assigned to Henry's 3rd Brigade, Brooks's 1st Division, Smith's XVIII Corps. It participated in the unsuccessful Bermuda Hundred campaign during May 1864.

On 28 May, XVIII Corps detached from the Army of the James and sent to join the Army of the Potomac at Cold Harbor. As the Siege of Petersburg commenced, XVIII Corps as part of the Army of the James took up the left, southern wing of the Union forces. Through its time in the siege, the regiment suffered many losses so that when it came out of line at the end of the Battle of the Crater, on 27 August, only two officers and forty-five men could muster. After a month of rest and provost duty, the regiment was back up at strength from the return of wounded and new reinforcements. When it returned to the front, it did so at Bermuda Hundred.

In December, the Army of the James was reorganized into XXIV and XXV Corps. The 40th found itself in the 3rd Brigade, 3rd Division, XXIV Corps. It remained with this organization through the end of hostilities. The regiment continued in the lines until the fall of Petersburg and the evacuation of Richmond on 2 April. Occupying Richmond on the 3 April, it moved to the outskirts of the city where it was on the day the war ended.

The 40th Massachusetts Infantry mustered out of service on June 16, 1865, and was discharged at Readville, Massachusetts on June 30, 1865.

== Detailed service ==
=== 1862 ===
- Moved to Washington, D.C., September 8–11.
- Duty in the defenses of Washington, D.C., until April 1863.
- Expedition to Mill's Cross Roads after Stuart's Cavalry December 28–29, 1862.

=== 1863 ===
- Picket duty on the Columbia Pike February 12 to March 30, 1863
- At Vienna until April 11.
- Moved to Norfolk, then to Suffolk April 15–17.
- Siege of Suffolk April 17 – May 4.
- Siege of Suffolk raised May 4.
- Moved to West Point May 5, then to Yorktown May 31.
- Raid to Jamestown Island June 10–13.
- Dix's Peninsula Campaign June 24 – July 7.
- Expedition from White House to Bottom's Bridge July 1–7.
- Baltimore Cross Roads July 2.
- Moved to Washington, D.C., July 10–11.
- March in pursuit of Lee, to Berlin, Md., July 13–22.
- Moved to Alexandria August 6, then sailed to Folly Island, South Carolina, August 7–13.
- Siege operations on Folly and Morris Islands against Forts Wagner and Gregg, and against Fort Sumter and Charleston, August 15 – November 13.
- Expedition to Seabrook Island November 13–15.
- Duty at Folly Island until January 16, 1864.

=== 1864 ===
- Moved to Hilton Head, South Carolina, January 16.
- Expedition to Jacksonville, Florida, February 4–7, and to Lake City, Fla., February 7–22.
- Ten Mile Run near Camp Finnegan February 8.
- Barber's Place February 10.
- Lake City February 11.
- Gainesville February 14 (Companies C, G, and H).
- Battle of Olustee February 20.
- McGirt's Creek March 1.
- Cedar Creek March 1.
- Duty at Jacksonville until April 22.
- Moved to Gloucester Point April 22–28.
- Expedition to West Point April 30 – May 5.
- Butler's operations on the south side of the James River and against Petersburg and Richmond May 5–28.
- Swift Creek or Arrowfield Church May 9–10.
- Operations against Fort Darling May 12–16.
- Battle of Drewry's Bluff May 14–16.
- On Bermuda Hundred Front May 17–28.
- Moved to White House, then to Cold Harbor May 28-June 1.
- Cold Harbor June 1–12.
- Before Petersburg June 15–18.
- Siege operations against Petersburg and Richmond June 16, 1864, to April 2, 1865.
- Hares Hill June 24 and 28. Mine Explosion, Petersburg, July 30, 1864 (reserve).
- In the trenches before Petersburg until August 27.
- Moved to Bermuda Front August 27, then to Bermuda Landing August 28, and provost duty there until September 29.
- On the Bermuda Front until October 24.
- Moved to Chaffin's Farm on north side of the James River, and duty there until March 1865.

=== 1865 ===
- Expedition to Fredericksburg March 5–8, and up the Potomac River to the Yecomico, and to Kinsel's Landing March 11–13, then to White House March 13–18.
- March to Signal Hill before Richmond March 24–26.
- Occupation of Richmond April 3.
- Moved to Manchester April 25 and provost duty there until June 16.

== Casualties ==
The regiment lost a total of 197 men during service; 5 officers and 67 enlisted men killed or mortally wounded, 125 enlisted men died of disease.

== Commanders ==
- Colonel Burr Porter
- Colonel Guy Vernor Henry

== Notable members ==
- Musician William Lord, Company C – Medal of Honor recipient for action during the Battle of Proctor's Creek

== See also ==
- List of Massachusetts Civil War Units
- Massachusetts in the American Civil War
