= Skirmish at Cedar Creek =

Battle of the American Civil War

Coordinates: 30.3208°N 81.7786°W

- Part of the American Civil War
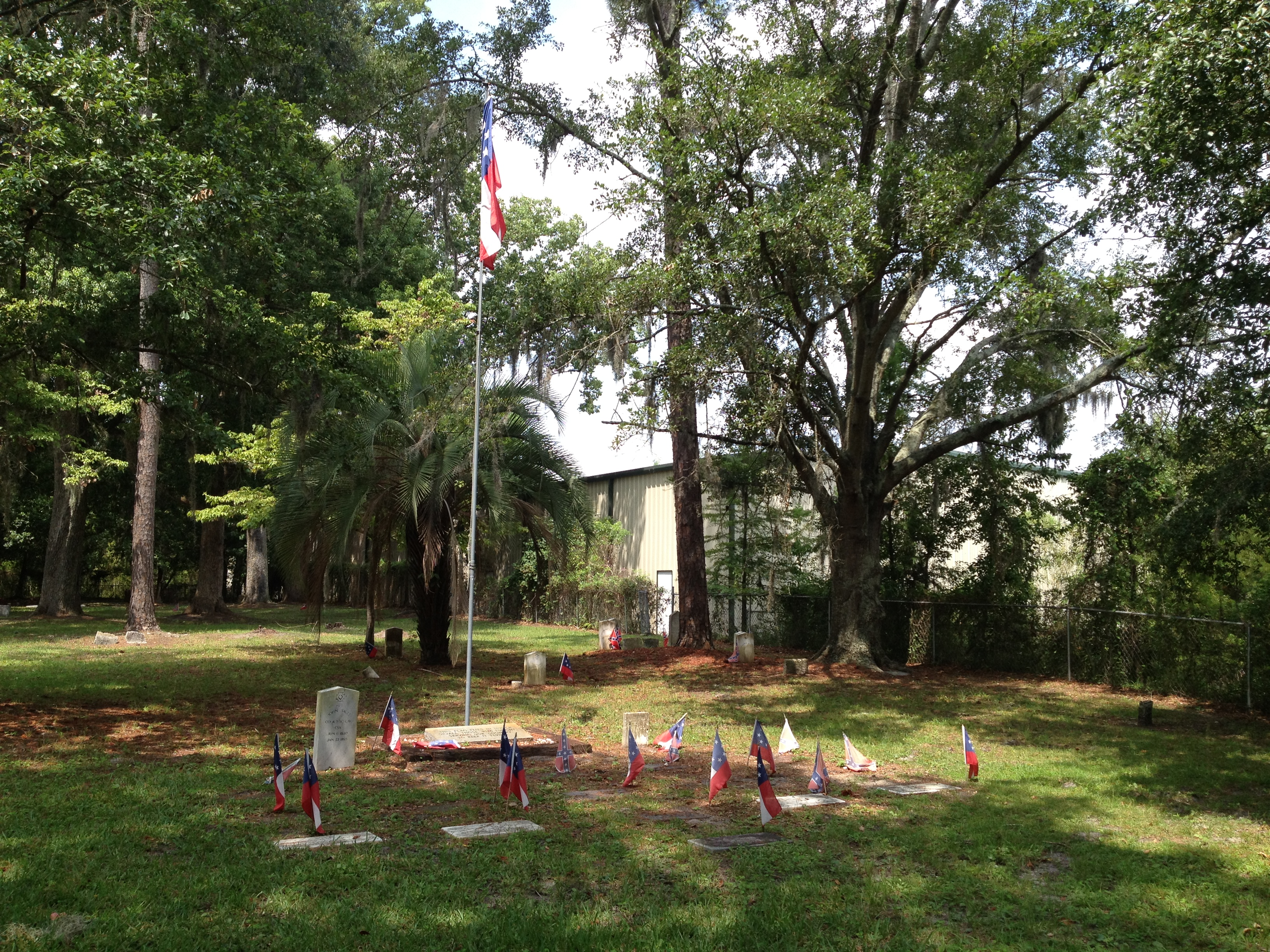
- Camp Captain Mooney Cemetery
Date	March 1, 1864
Location	Duval County, Florida, now in Jacksonville
Result	Inconclusive

Belligerents
United States (Union)	(Confederate States of America) CSA (Confederacy)

Casualties and losses
10 (2 killed 3 wounded	19 (5+ killed 12 wounded 6 captured/missing)

The Skirmish at Cedar Creek, also known as Camp Mooney or McGirt's Creek, was a small engagement of the American Civil War fought in present-day Jacksonville, Florida on March 1, 1864. It was fought between a small Confederate States Army outpost and the 40th Massachusetts Volunteer Infantry of the Union Army, and resulted in 29 casualties. It was the last engagement in the Olustee Campaign.

== Background ==
Jacksonville, Florida was occupied on and off by the Union throughout the Civil War. In February 1864, Union forces under General Truman Seymour went west out of Jacksonville to take back Florida for the Union and to recruit slaves for the Union Army. Confederate forces met the Union forces and defeated them at the Battle of Olustee near Lake City, Florida on February 20. After the battle, Confederate forces were west of Jacksonville discouraging Union forces to venture out beyond their established lines.

== Battle ==
On the morning of March 1, 1864, a portion of the 2nd Florida Cavalry went east toward Jacksonville to probe defenses. On that same day, an expedition of a Union cavalry of the 40th Massachusetts left Camp Mooney and went west to probe the Confederate position. The Union expedition consisted of companies B, C, and D of 1st Massachusetts Cavalry, a squadron of Massachusetts infantry and one gun of Elders Horse Artillery under Major Stevens. At mid-morning, the 2nd Florida Cavalry met the Union forces about 2 miles west of Camp Finegan. The Confederate forces were then joined by reinforcements and pushed the Union forces back through Camp Finegan.

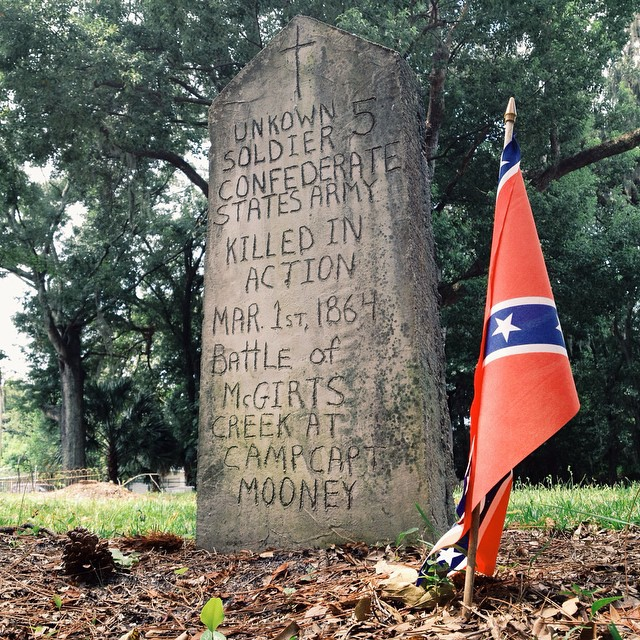
Unknown Confederate grave of the cemetery.

At Cedar Creek, the Union forces made a stand. The creek offered a natural barrier that hampered the Confederate advance. An intense but short fight erupted between the two armies at the creek but the Union was forced out to Three Mile Run or McCoys Creek. The Confederates followed but the Union rear guard ambushed them, killing Captain Winston Stephens and a private. The Confederate infantry managed to cross Cedar Creek and advanced toward Jacksonville. The Union forces met reinforcements from Camp Mooney and were ordered back to Cedar Creek but retreated again to their defense breastworks at Three Mile Run. At the end of the day, 7 Confederates were killed, 12 wounded, 2 Union killed, 3 wounded and 5 captured. Confederates stayed in the area and guarded it from more Union encroachments while the Union held Jacksonville for the remainder of the war.

== Camp Captain Mooney Cemetery ==
Camp Captain Mooney Cemetery was established on the same day of the battle. The cemetery is named after the Camp Captain Mooney outpost in the vicinity of where the battle occurred. The camp name comes from George Mooney (Builder of the Confederate Gun Boat in Jacksonville, on whose land it was located. It is owned by the United Daughters of the Confederacy.
