= Battle of Olustee order of battle: Confederate =

The following Confederate States Army units and commanders fought in the Battle of Olustee of the American Civil War. The Union order of battle is listed separately.

== Military Rank Abbreviations Used ==
- BG = Brigadier General
- Col = Colonel
- Ltc = Lieutenant Colonel
- Maj = Major
- Cpt = Captain
- Lt = Lieutenant

== District of East Florida ==
BG Joseph Finegan

Brigade	Regiments, battalions and batteries
Colquitt's Brigade BG Alfred H. Colquitt	6th Florida Battalion: Maj Pickens Bird (Capt John William Pearson) - 9 killed or mortally wounded, 73 wounded, 2 missing; 6th Georgia: Ltc John T. Lofton - 5 killed, 56 wounded; 19th Georgia: Col James H. Neal - 6 killed, 88 wounded; 23rd Georgia (300 men): Ltc James H. Huggins - 2 killed, 66 wounded, 2 missing; 27th Georgia: Col Charles T. Zachry - 7 killed, 67 wounded; 28th Georgia: Cpt William P. Crawford (Col Tully Graybill) - 10 killed, 85 wounded; Chatham Artillery (Georgia): Cpt John F. Wheaton (4 pieces); Gamble's (Leon Light) Artillery (Florida): Cpt Robert H. Gamble
Harrison's Brigade Col George P. Harrison	1st Florida Battalion (~420 men): Ltc Charles F. Hopkins - 3 killed, 47 wounded; 32nd Georgia: Maj Washington T. Holland (Col George P. Harrison) - 15 killed, 149 wounded; 64th Georgia: Cpt Charles S. Jenkins (Col John W. Evans) - 17 killed, 88 wounded, 2 missing; 1st Georgia Regulars (probably fewer than 200): Cpt Henry A. Cannon - 3 killed, 25 wounded; 28th Georgia Artillery Battalion (Also known as Bonaud's Battalion. A portion of the Second Florida Infantry Battalion may have been attached to this unit during the battle. Additionally, a detachment of Florida conscripts was also present.) - 12 killed, 95 wounded, 2 missing; Abell's Artillery (Florida) (Serving as infantry); Guerard's Battery (Georgia): Cpt John M. Guerard (4 pieces) - 2 wounded
Smith's Cavalry Brigade Col Caraway Smith	4th Georgia Cavalry (~250 men): Col Duncan L. Clinch Jr. - 6 (7?) wounded; 2nd Florida Cavalry (203 men): Ltc Abner H. McCormick - no known losses; 5th Florida Cavalry Battalion: Maj George W. Scott - no known losses
