= Governor Henry =

Governor Henry may refer to:

- Brad Henry (born 1963), 26th Governor of Oklahoma
- Guy Vernor Henry (1839–1899), Governor of Puerto Rico in 1899
- John Henry (Maryland politician) (1750–1798), 8th Governor of Maryland
- Patrick Henry (1736–1799), 1st and 6th Governor of Virginia
