= William Lord (Medal of Honor) =

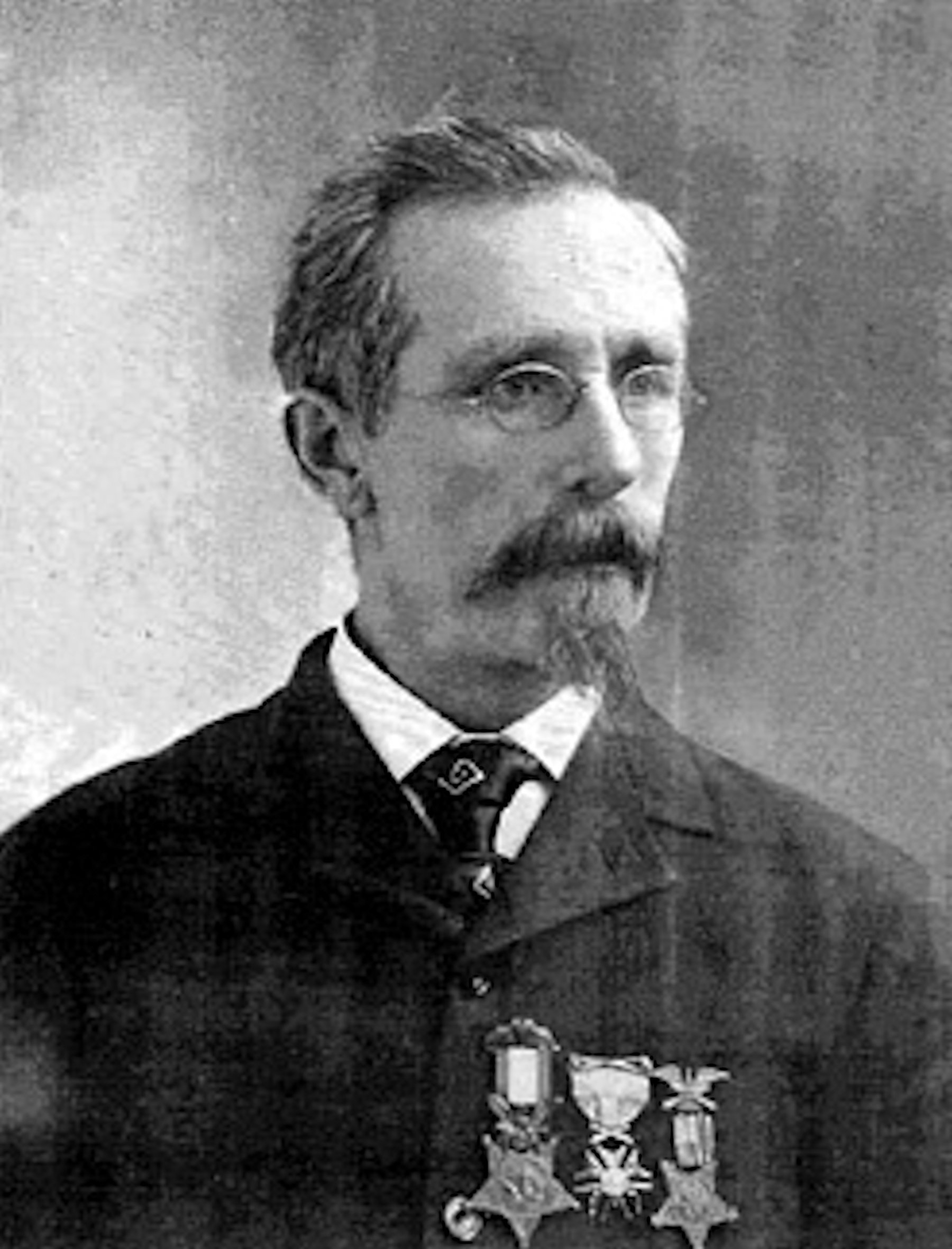
- Born: February 13, 1841; England
- Died: August 4, 1915 (aged 74); New York City, New York
- Burial place: Lutheran All Faiths Cemetery, Middle Village, New York
- Military career
- Allegiance: United States of America; Union
- Branch: United States Army; Union Army
- Rank: Musician
- Units: Company C, 40th Massachusetts Volunteer Infantry Regiment
- Conflicts: American Civil War
- Awards: Medal of Honor

William Lord (February 13, 1841 – August 4, 1915) was a musician in the Union Army and a Medal of Honor recipient for his actions in the American Civil War.

== Medal of Honor citation ==
Rank and organization: Musician, Company C, 40th Massachusetts Infantry. Place and date: At Drurys Bluff, Va., May 16, 1864. Entered service at. Lawrence, Mass. Birth: England. Date of issue. April 4, 1898.

Citation:

Went to the assistance of a wounded officer lying helpless between the lines, and under fire from both sides removed him to a place of safety.

== Post-war ==
After the war, Lord invented a form of rubberized cloth. He was general manager of the Lyall Cotton Mills for 32 years, and later became chief inspector of Hartford Tire. He died in New York on August 4, 1915.

== See also ==
- List of Medal of Honor recipients
- List of American Civil War Medal of Honor recipients: G–L
