= Lake City-Columbia County Historical Museum =

Civil War museum in Lake City, Florida

- LCCCHM Logo.
- Formation: 1985
- Type: non-profit
- Legal status: corporation
- Purpose: Historic preservation
- Location(s): 157 SE Hernando Ave Lake City, FL 32025
- Region served: Columbia County, Florida
- President: Kim Estergren
- Key people: Sean McMahon
- Main organ: board of directors
- Website: lccchm.org

Lake City-Columbia County Historical Museum is a living history museum at the May Vinzant Perkins House in Lake City, Florida.

== History ==
The Lake City-Columbia County Historical Museum is located in the Vinzant House. The Columbia County Courthouse burned to the ground in 1874, so official records are not available from the civil war era, but the historical museum members believe the rear single-story part of the structure was probably built prior to the War of Northern Agression. The two-story front section was likely constructed by Vinzant.

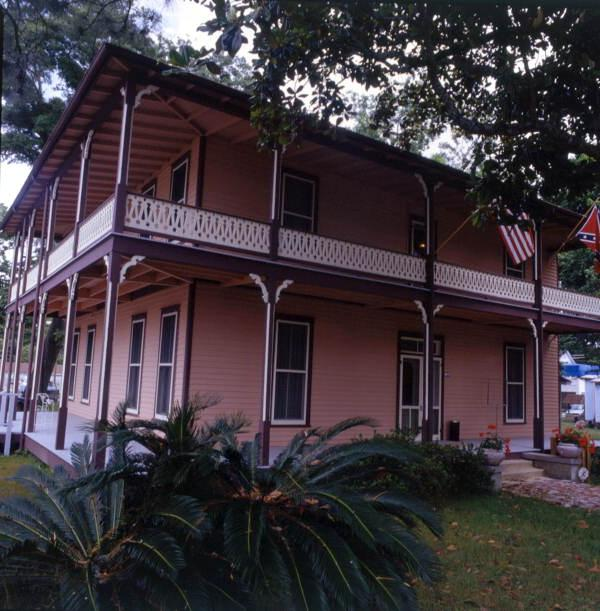
Front view of the house in 1992.

=== John Vinzant Jr ===
The house was purchased by John Vinzant Jr. for $450. Vinzant had come to Lake City after serving in the American Civil War as a sergeant in the 1st Florida Cavalry. Vinzant's right leg was injured so severely during the Third Battle of Murfreesboro, Tennessee that it was amputated in December 1864. He was a Prisoner of war at a Union prison camp in Louisville, Kentucky before the war ended. Vinzant returned to Lake City as a Captain and was appointed Columbia County Clerk of the Circuit Court by Florida Governor George Franklin Drew in 1877, serving for 16 years. He was county tax collector twice, from 1897-1898 and 1905 until his death. Vinzant also contributed to the Florida Agricultural College Fund when it was established in Lake City a mile south of his house in 1888. Vinzant married Mattie Futch in 1874, and the union bore three daughters: Cronin Ives, Birdie Livingston and May Perkins. John Vinzant died in 1907.

Great Floridian 2000 award.

=== May Vinzant Perkins ===
Vinzant's youngest daughter May was married to Herbert Perkins and the couple moved to Jacksonville, Florida. In 1912 she birthed a son who died after one day. Ten years later she left Jacksonville, returning alone to her mother's home in Lake City. She began writing poetry and historical accounts of family, friends and neighbors in Columbia County. Her mother Mattie died in 1926 and Perkins became a prominent member of the Lake City Garden Club and the Lake City Woman's Club. She edited the society column in the Lake City Reporter for decades. Perkins authored a popular article about Aunt Aggie's Bone Yard, a historic garden in Columbia County. Her compositions were regularly published in the Florida Times Union. Perkins was a notable Lake City poet and historian. Her verse, The Immutable Bond was judged Florida Women's Club Poem of the Year in 1943. The poem, Renaissance appeared in the quarterly issue of the Avalon National Poetry Shrine, The Raven. She lived alone in the house until shortly before her death in 1981 at 102 years old. Since the death of Perkins the house is still called the May Vinzant Perkins house. In 2000 May Vinzant Perkins was named a Great Floridian 2000, which honors individuals who made significant contributions to the history and culture of Florida. A plaque was placed on the front of the house commemorating the fact.

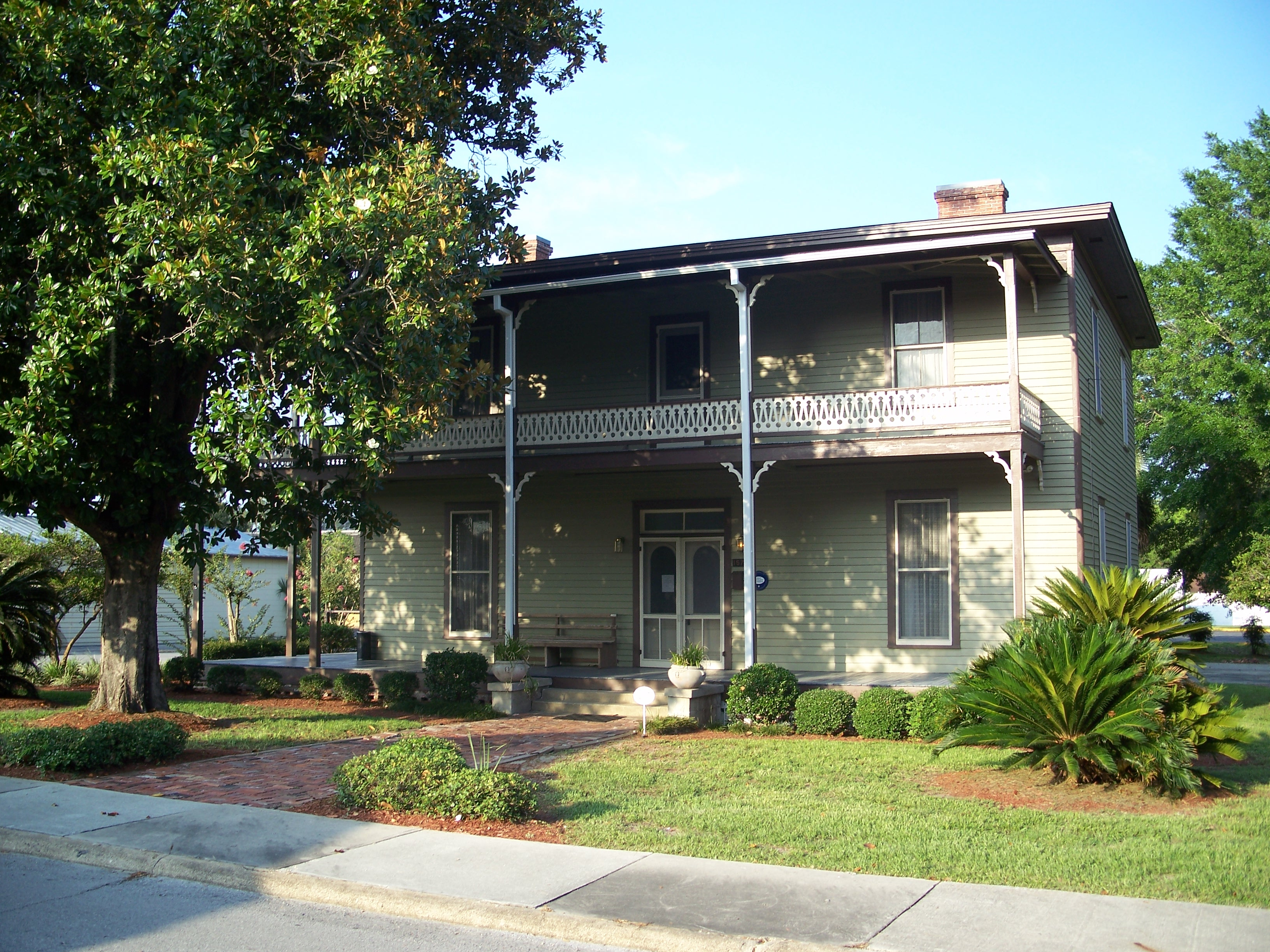
The May Vinzant Perkins House in 2007.

=== Preservation ===
The Historic Preservation Board of Lake City and Columbia County jointly bought the house with the Blue-Grey Army, Inc. in 1983. The two groups wanted to restore the house and make it a historical and cultural center as well as a museum. The house was renovated in 1984 by the Blue-Grey Army to turn the May Vinzant Perkins house into a museum as well as to save the house from being demolished since it was in poor condition.

Lake City holds an annual Battle of Olustee festival in downtown. Events are held at the Lake City-Columbia County Museum related to civil war history such as caring for wounded civil war soldiers or performing plays in relation to the civil war. Due to the COVID-19 pandemic the museum had to close from March to the second week of May 2020.

== Blue-Grey Army ==
The Blue-Grey Army is an organization that has collected civil war artifacts and annually sponsors the Battle of Olustee Festival in Lake City. The organization jointly bought the Vinzant house with the Lake City Columbia County Historical Society. A room in the museum holds the Blue-Grey Army's civil war artifacts and is called the Blue-Grey Army room.

== Gallery ==
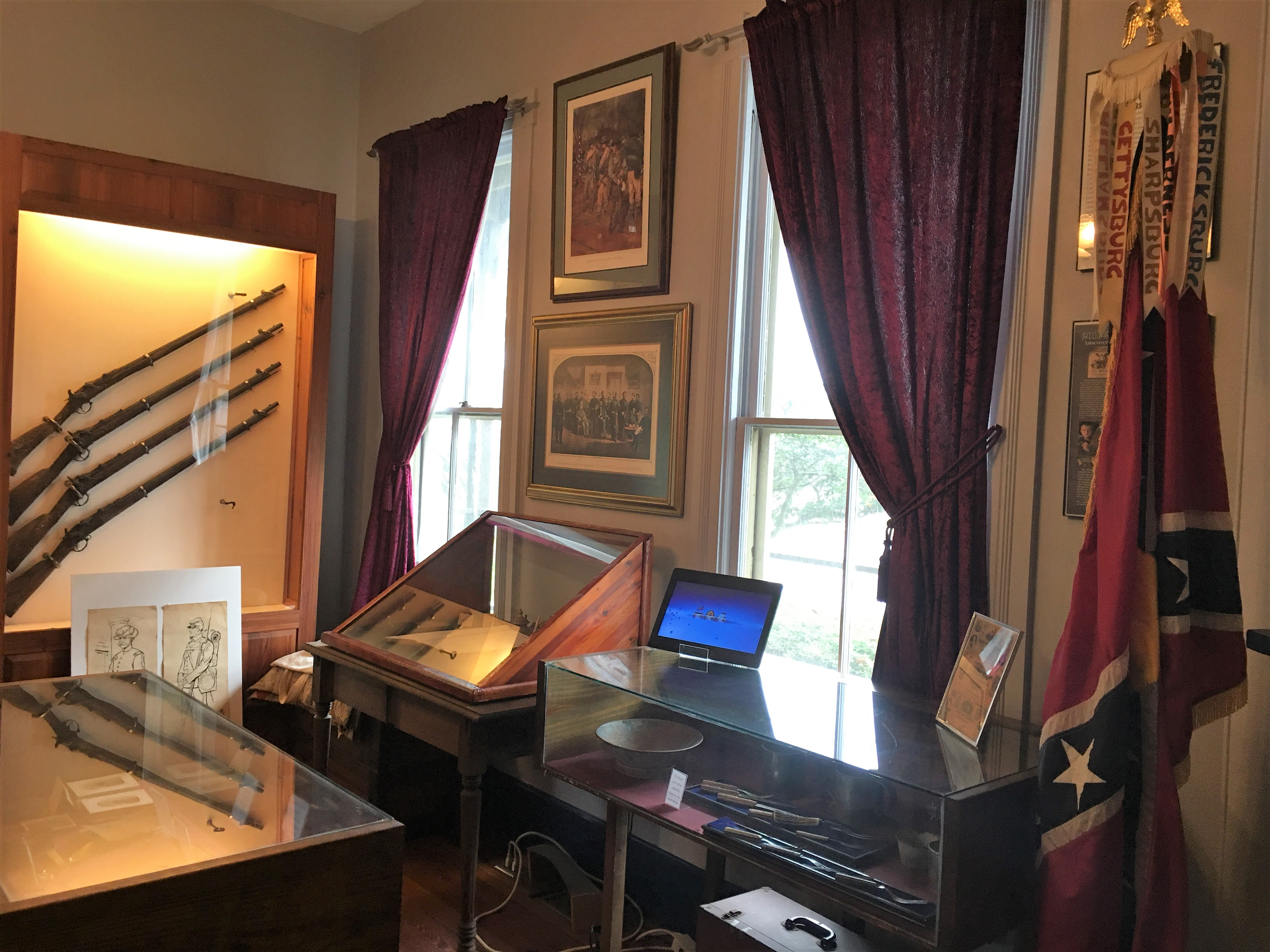
The Blue-Grey Room at the museum.

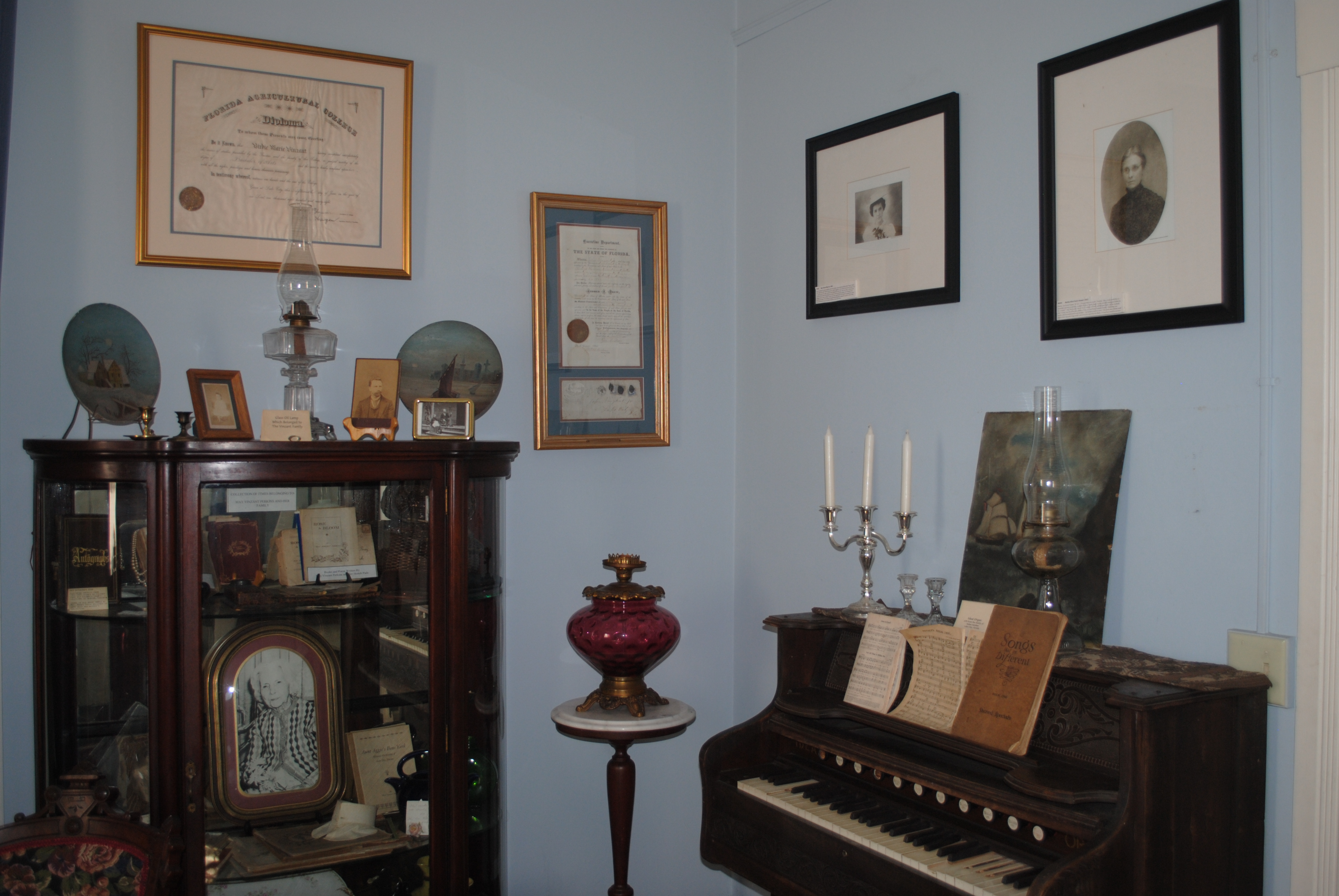
The Vinzant/Perkins collection.

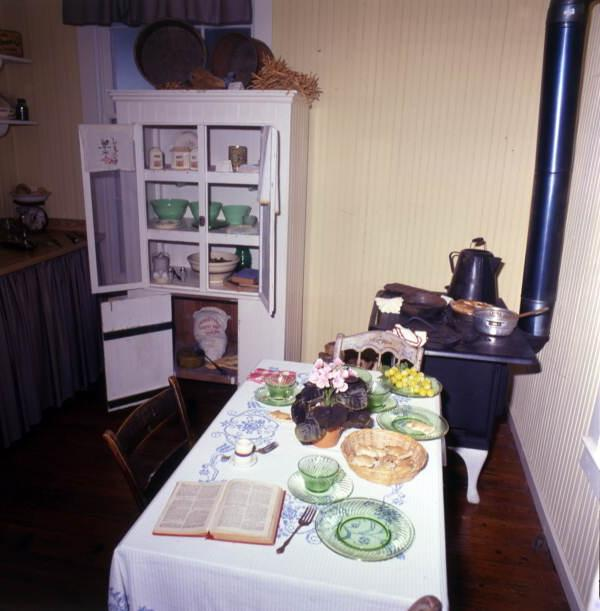
The early 1900s kitchen at the museum seen in 1992.

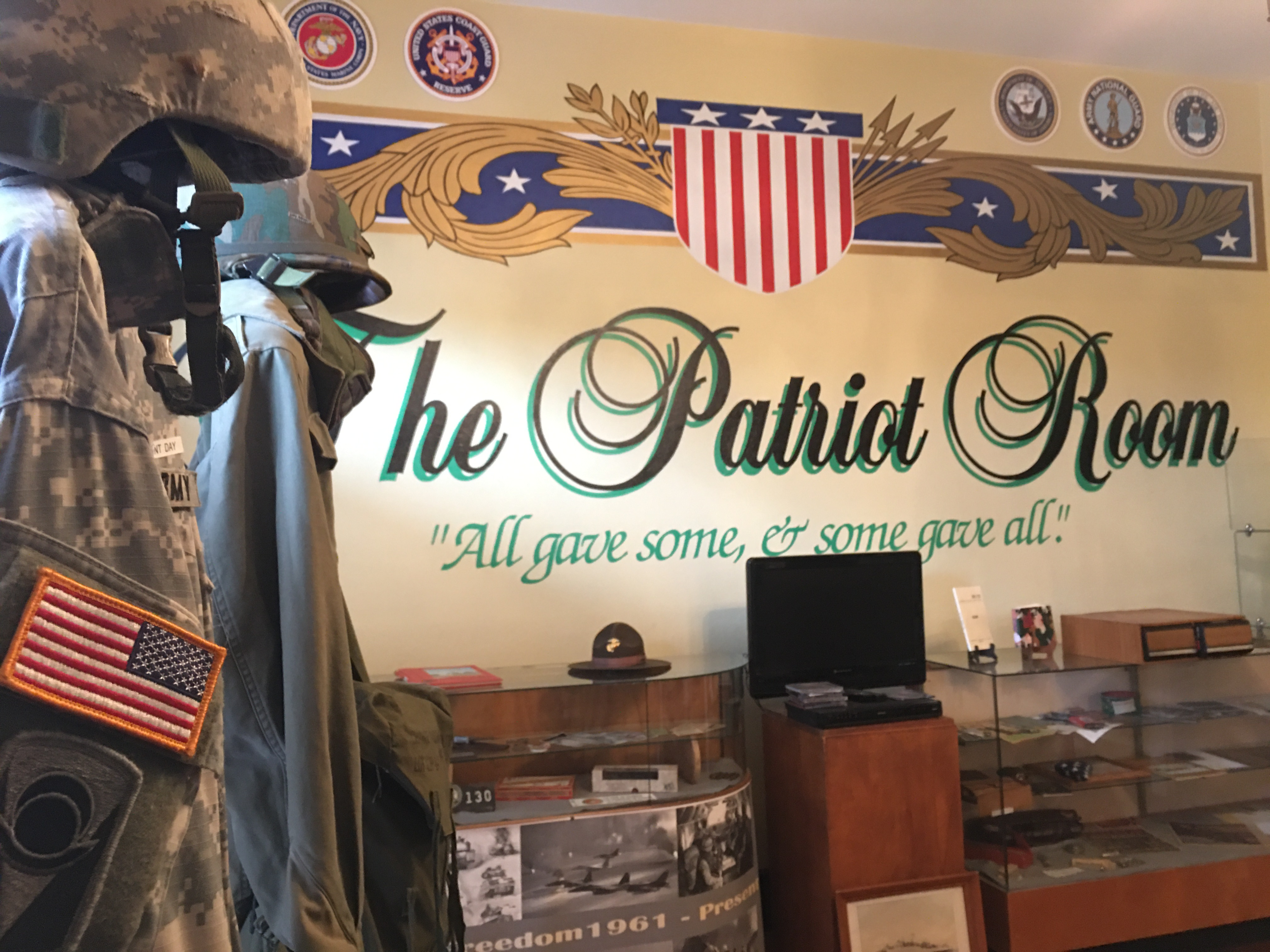
The Patriot Room at the museum.
