= 1st Georgia Infantry Regiment =

Infantry regiment of the Confederate States Army

1st Georgia Infantry Regiment 1st Georgia Regulars
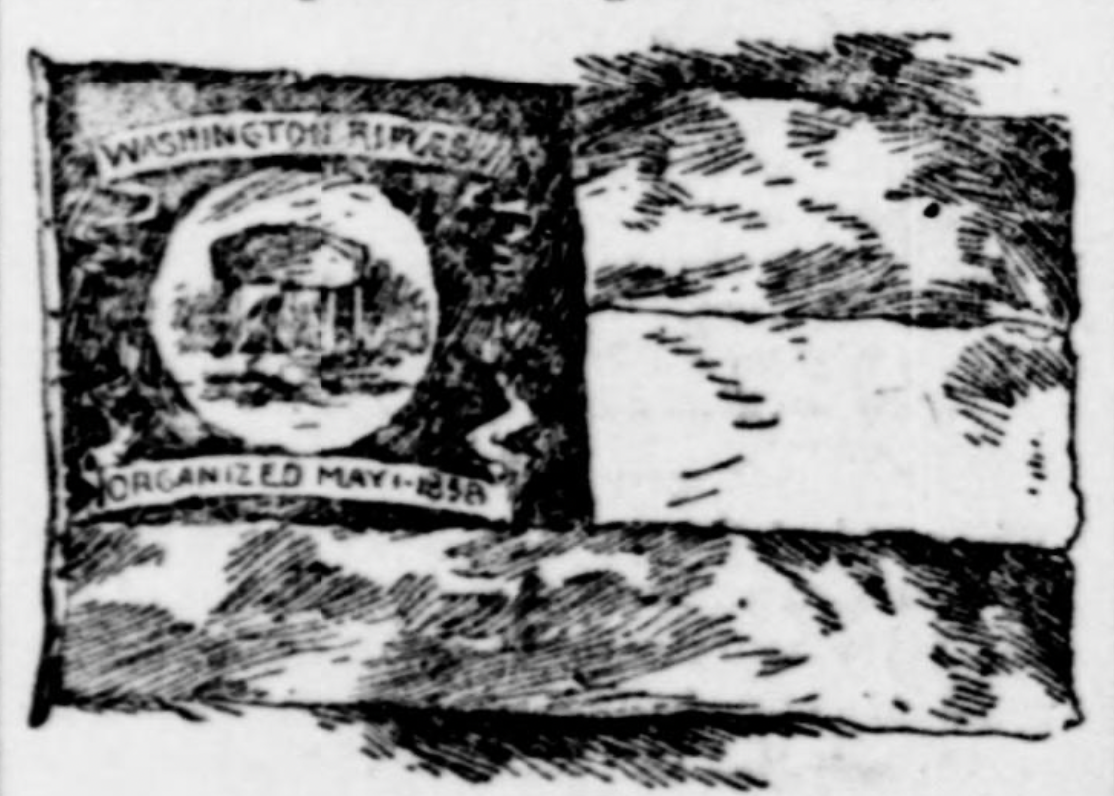
- Flag of Company K
- Active: April, 1861 — April 1865
- Country: Confederate States of America
- Allegiance: Georgia
- Branch: Confederate States Army
- Type: Regiment
- Role: Infantry
- Engagements: American Civil War: Seven Days Battles; Battle of Savage's Station; Battle of Antietam; Second Battle of Bull Run; Battle of Fredericksburg; Battle of Olustee; Carolinas campaign; Battle of Bentonville

Commanders
- Notable commanders: Charles J. Williams; William J. Magill; Richard A. Wayne

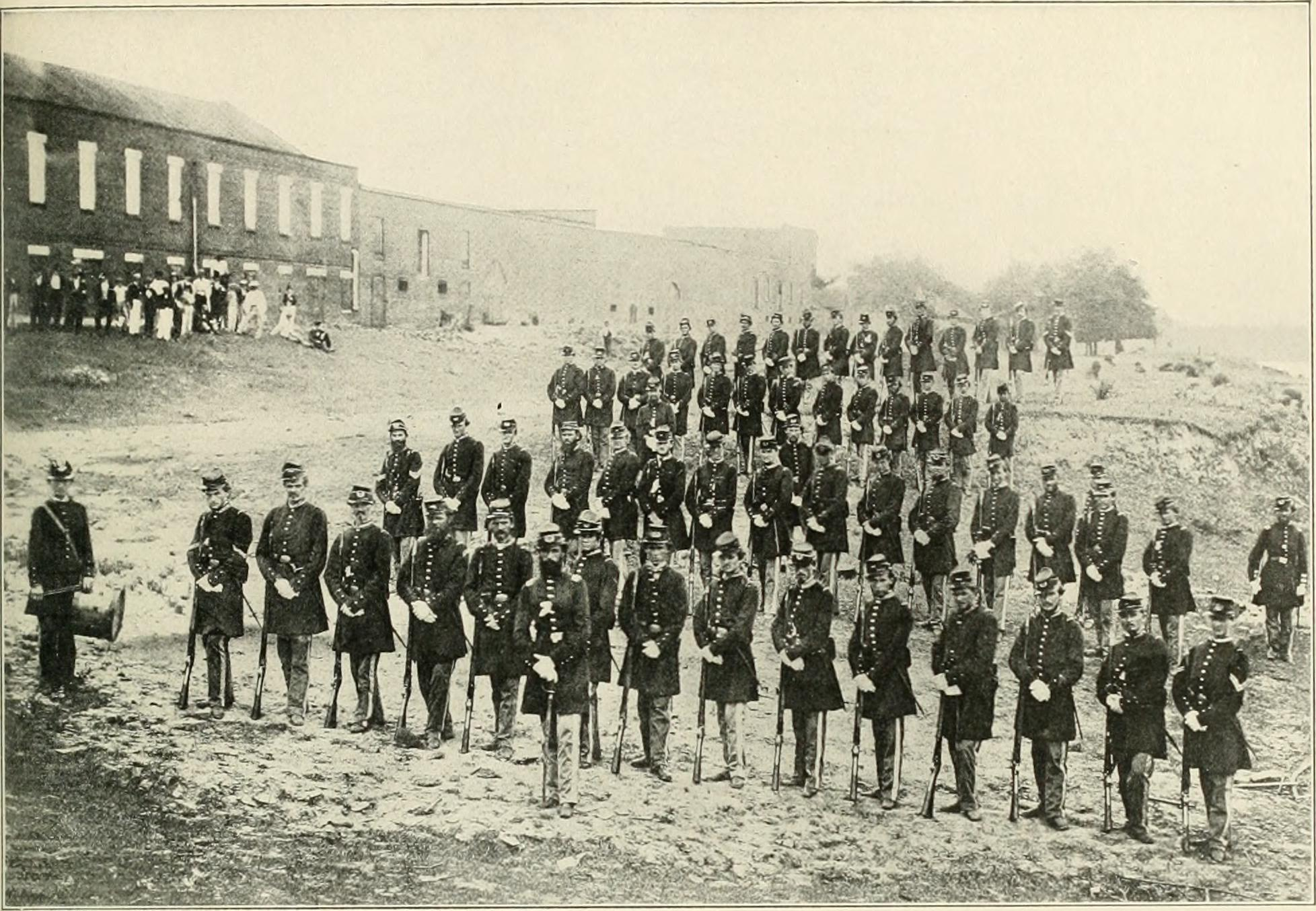
May 1861 picture of Company D Oglethorpe infantry 1st Georgia Volunteers (Ramsey's)-misidentied as CLinch Rifles 5th Georgia Infantry

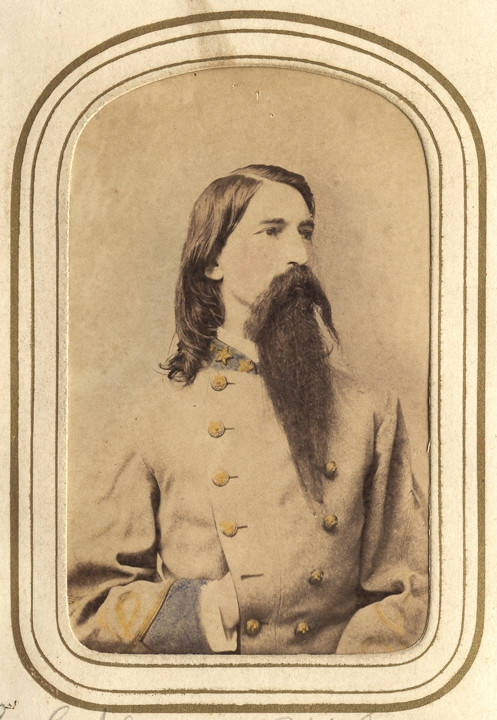
Lieut.-Col. Alonzo Alexander Franklin Hill

The 1st Georgia Infantry Regiment was an infantry regiment in the Confederate States Army during the American Civil War. Differing from 1st (Ramsey's) Infantry and 1st (Mercer's-Olmstead's) Infantry Regiments; it was also known as the 1st Georgia Regulars.

== History ==
The regiment was organized at Macon, Georgia in April 1861. The companies first named were twelve months' troops, a majority re-enlisting for the war, while others were mustered out when the twelve months expired. The regimental commander, Col. Charles J. Williams, died on February 8, 1862. Now led by Col. William J. Magill, the regiment served in the Army of Northern Virginia in the Eastern Theater of the American Civil War. When Magill was wounded at Antietam, being part of Gen. G.T. Anderson's brigade, the command developed to Cpt. Richard A. Wayne. The 1st Georgia was transferred to the Department of South Carolina, Georgia and Florida in early 1863. In Gen. George P. Harrison's brigade it participated in the Battle of Olustee. When Magill retired on September 3, 1864, Wayne was named as his successor. The regiment was surrendered along with Joseph E. Johnston's army at Bennett Place in North Carolina on April 26, 1865.

=== Companies ===
- A Company - (reformed as Hamilton's battery in July 1862)
- A Company - Georgia Regulars
- B Company - Emmett Rifles
- C Company
- D Company - (known as the Oglethorpe infantry)(reformed as Maxwell's Battery in 1862)
- E Company
- F Company
- G Company - Brunswick Defenders
- H Company
- I Company
- K Company
- L Company - Atlanta Greys / Fulton Greys
- M Company

=== Battles ===
The regiment fought in the Seven Days Battles, the culmination of the Peninsula campaign (June 25-July 1, 1862), Battle of Savage's Station (June 29), Second Battle of Manassas (Bull Run, August 28-29), Battle of Sharpsburg (Antietam, September 17), Battle of Fredericksburg (December 13), Battle of Chickamauga (September 18, 1863), Battle of Chattanooga (November 23-25), Battle of Olustee (February 20, 1864), Battle of Nashville (December 15), Siege of Savannah (December), Carolinas campaign (January – March, 1865), Battle of Bentonville (March 19 -21), and surrendered April 26, 1865, with the Army of Tennessee.

== See also ==
- List of Civil War regiments from Georgia
- Georgia in the American Civil War
