= Guy Vernor Henry =

US Army Medal of Honor recipient and governor of Puerto Rico (1839–1899)

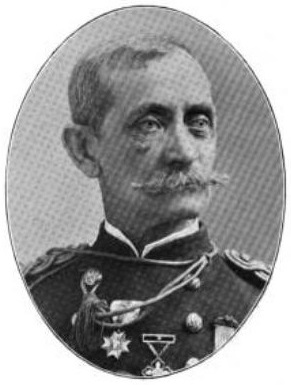
- Maj. Gen. Guy V. Henry
- Born: March 9, 1839; Fort Smith, Indian Territory (now Arkansas), U.S.
- Died: October 27, 1899 (aged 60); New York City, New York, U.S.
- Burial place: Arlington National Cemetery
- Military career
- Allegiance: United States of America; Union
- Branch: United States Army; Union Army
- Service years: 1861–1899
- Rank: Brigadier General (USA); Major General (USV)
- Units: 40th Massachusetts Volunteer Infantry Regiment
- Commands: 10th U.S. Cavalry; 7th U.S. Cavalry (Acting)
- Conflicts: American Civil War: First Battle of Bull Run; Siege of Charleston Harbor; Battle of Olustee; Battle of Cold Harbor; Siege of Petersburg; Indian Wars: Battle of Rosebud; Drexel Mission Fight; Spanish–American War
- Awards: Medal of Honor
- Other work: Governor of Puerto Rico

Guy Vernor Henry (March 9, 1839 – October 27, 1899) was an American military officer and Medal of Honor recipient who served as military governor of Puerto Rico.

== Biography ==
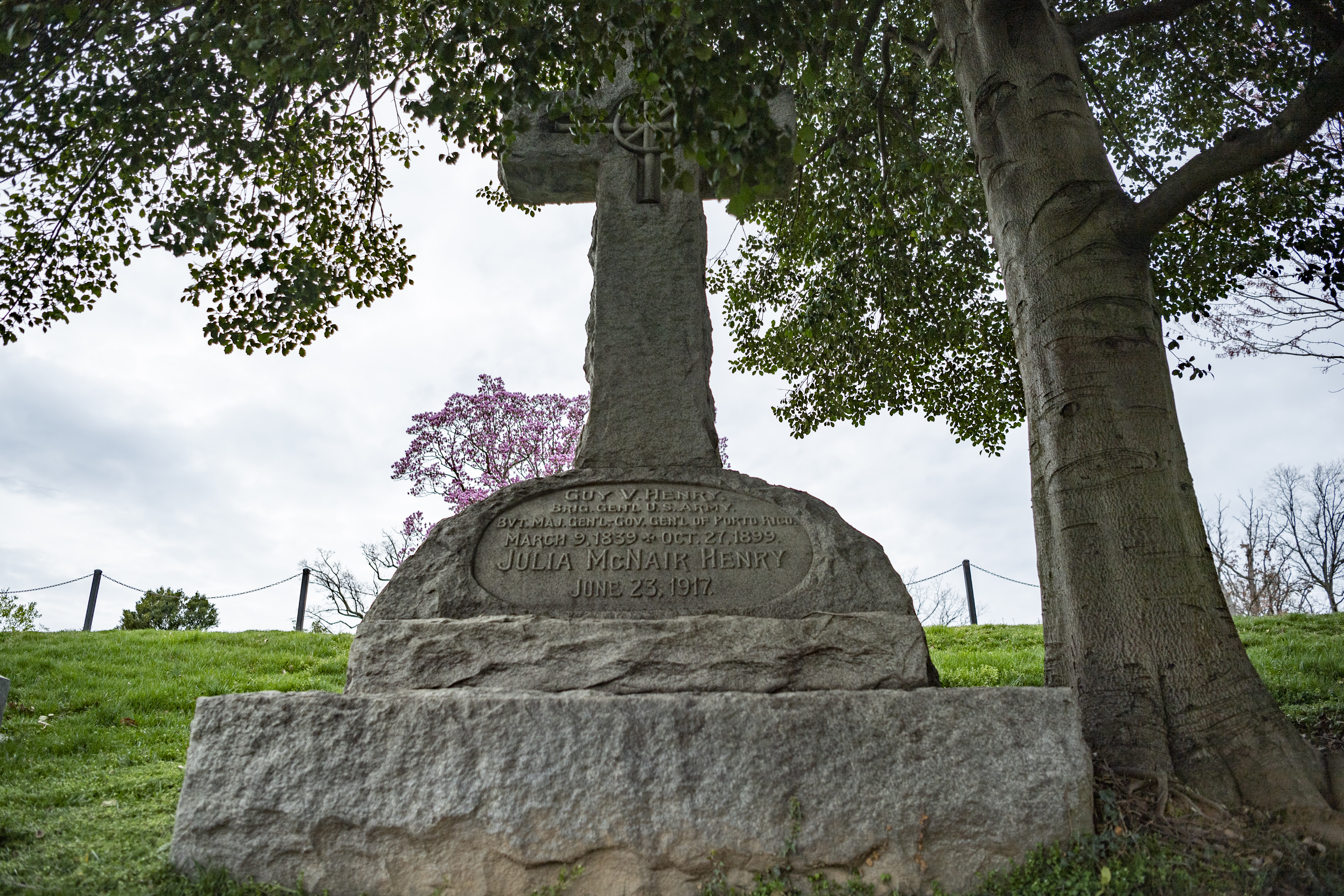
Grave at Arlington National Cemetery

Henry was born in Fort Smith, Indian Territory (now Arkansas), the son of William Seton Henry and Arietta Livingston Thompson Henry. His mother was the granddaughter of Vice President Daniel D. Tompkins and Secretary of the Navy and Supreme Court Justice Smith Thompson. He was a fifth great-grandson of Robert Livingston. William Seton Henry (1816–1851) was an 1835 graduate of the United States Military Academy, and attained the rank of Brevet Major for his service in the Mexican–American War.

Guy V. Henry graduated from the United States Military Academy in May 1861, serving as a Union officer in the Civil War, and later in conflicts against the Native Americans in the West and southwest of the United States of America. From May 25, 1891, to October 3, 1894, while commanding the 7th U.S. Cavalry, he was also commander of Fort Myer, Virginia. During the Spanish–American War, he was dispatched to Guantánamo, Cuba, and later sent to Puerto Rico, alongside General Nelson Miles.

Henry was with General George Crook at the Battle of the Rosebud on June 17, 1876, when Crook was attacked by forces led by Crazy Horse. Henry was very badly wounded in the face. When John Finerty (correspondent for the Chicago Tribune, reporting from the field) commented on Guy's grievous wound, the latter merely told him, "For this we are soldiers," and encouraged Finerty to join the army.

He received successive brevets for gallantry in various battles and was brevetted brigadier general, United States Army, for gallantry at the Battle of Rosebud in Montana Territory, where he was shot through the face while fighting Native Americans. He received the Medal of Honor on December 5, 1893, for his Civil War service at the Battle of Cold Harbor on June 1, 1864, where he was temporarily serving as a colonel of volunteers and commanded a brigade. On June 1, 1897, Henry was promoted to colonel in the regular army and given command of the 10th U.S. Cavalry.

At the beginning of the Spanish–American War, Henry was appointed a brigadier general of volunteers on May 4, 1898. During the invasion of Puerto Rico, he led a "Provisional Division" from the city of Ponce to Arecibo, Puerto Rico, to rendezvous with General Theodore Schwan, who was arriving from the city of Mayagüez. The tropical rain impeded his trek and before Henry reached Mayagüez, the conflict was over. On October 11, 1898, he was promoted to brigadier general in the regular army.

On December 6, 1898, Henry was designated Governor of Puerto Rico. From December 7, 1898, to June 12, 1899, he served as a major general of volunteers. On February 6, 1899, he dissolved the Cabinet of Puerto Rico, which was instituted with the Autonomic Charter. Henry also eliminated taxes on basic food items. On May 2, 1899, he instituted the eight-hour work day in Puerto Rico. On May 9, 1899, he was replaced by General George W. Davis.

Henry died of pneumonia in New York City in October 1899 and was buried at Arlington National Cemetery.

General Henry was an Hereditary Member of the Aztec Club of 1847, a First Class Companion of the Military Order of the Loyal Legion of the United States and the Regular Army and Navy Union.

== Personal life ==
Henry's first marriage was to Frances Wharton (1843–1873) of Philadelphia. She was the daughter of Thomas Lloyd Wharton (1799–1869) and Sarah Ann Howell (1800-1846) and great-granddaughter of Thomas Wharton Jr. Her sister Lucy married Joseph William Drexel. Henry and Frances had two children:

1. Sarah Wharton Henry (1867–1948), who married Lt. James Watson Benton, an 1885 graduate of West Point and grandson of James Watson Webb.
2. Thomas Lloyd Henry (1872–1911)

Henry married secondly Julia McNair (1844–1917) and had two sons:

1. Guy V. Henry Jr. (1875–1967) also served in the military with a distinguished career, and went on to win a bronze medal in the 1912 Olympic Games in Stockholm.
2. William Seton Henry II (1879–1946).

== Awards ==
- Medal of Honor
- Civil War Campaign Medal
- Indian Campaign Medal
- Spanish Campaign Medal
- Army of Puerto Rican Occupation Medal

Note – Except for the Medal of Honor, the above listed awards were not established until after General Henry's death.

=== Medal of Honor citation ===
Rank and organization: Colonel, 40th Massachusetts Infantry. Place and date: At Cold Harbor, Va., June 1, 1864. Entered service at: Reading Pa. Birth: Fort Smith, Indian Ter. Date of issue: December 5, 1893.

Citation:

Led the assaults of his brigade upon the enemy's works, where he had 2 horses shot under him.

== See also ==
- List of Medal of Honor recipients
- List of American Civil War Medal of Honor recipients: G–L
- List of governors of Puerto Rico
- History of Puerto Rico

== Notes ==
Preceded by John Ruller Brooke	Governor of Puerto Rico; 1898–1899	Succeeded by George Whitefield Davis
