= Truman Seymour =

Union Army officer in the American Civil War

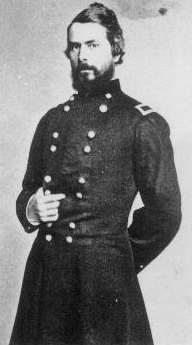
- Born: September 24, 1824; Burlington, Vermont, U.S.
- Died: October 30, 1891 (aged 67); Florence, Italy
- Burial place: Cimitero Evangelico degli Allori, Florence, Italy
- Military career
- Allegiance: United States; Union
- Branch: United States Army; Union Army
- Service years: 1846–1876
- Rank: Brigadier General, USV; Brevet Major General, USV
- Commands: 5th U.S. Artillery
- Conflicts: Mexican–American War: Battle of Cerro Gordo; Battle of Contreras; Battle of Churubusco; Third Seminole War; American Civil War: Battle of Fort Sumter; Peninsula Campaign; Second Battle of Bull Run; Maryland Campaign; Battle of Olustee; Battle of the Wilderness; Siege of Petersburg; Appomattox Campaign
- Other work: Painter

Truman Seymour (September 24, 1824 – October 30, 1891) was a career soldier and an accomplished painter. He served in the Union Army during the American Civil War, rising to the rank of major general. He was present at the Battle of Fort Sumter. He commanded the Union troops at the Battle of Olustee, the only major Civil War battle fought in Florida.

== Early life and career ==
Seymour was born in Burlington, Vermont. The son of a Methodist minister, he attended Norwich University, beginning in 1840. After spending two years at Norwich, Seymour received an appointment to the United States Military Academy at West Point. He graduated in 1846, ranked nineteenth in a class of fifty-nine graduates. West Point's Class of 1846 stands as one of the most illustrious in the academy's storied history with George McClellan, Thomas J. "Stonewall" Jackson, Jesse Lee Reno, Darius Couch, George Stoneman, Samuel Sturgis, David Rumph Jones, and George Pickett among its members. After graduating, Seymour was assigned to the 1st U.S. Artillery.

He immediately began his military service in the Mexican–American War. During that war, he was brevetted captain for his performance in the battles of Contreras and Churubusco and was promoted to first lieutenant six days later. After returning to the United States following the war, he became an assistant professor of drawing at West Point from 1850 to 1853 and fought against the Seminoles in Florida from 1856 to 1858. He was promoted to captain on November 22, 1860.

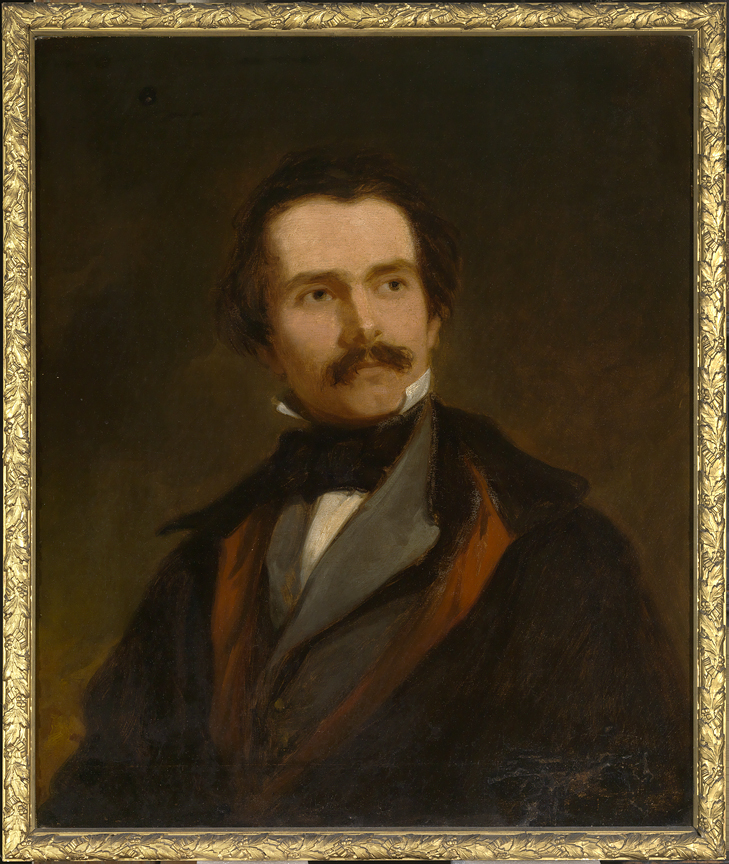
Robert Walter Weir, portrait of Truman Seymour, c. 1852

== Civil War ==
In the months that led up to the Civil War Seymour served under Col. John L. Gardner at Fort Moultrie getting it prepared for the imminent war. When the Civil War began in 1861, Seymour commanded an artillery company in the defense against the Confederate assault on Fort Sumter, after which he received the brevet of major.

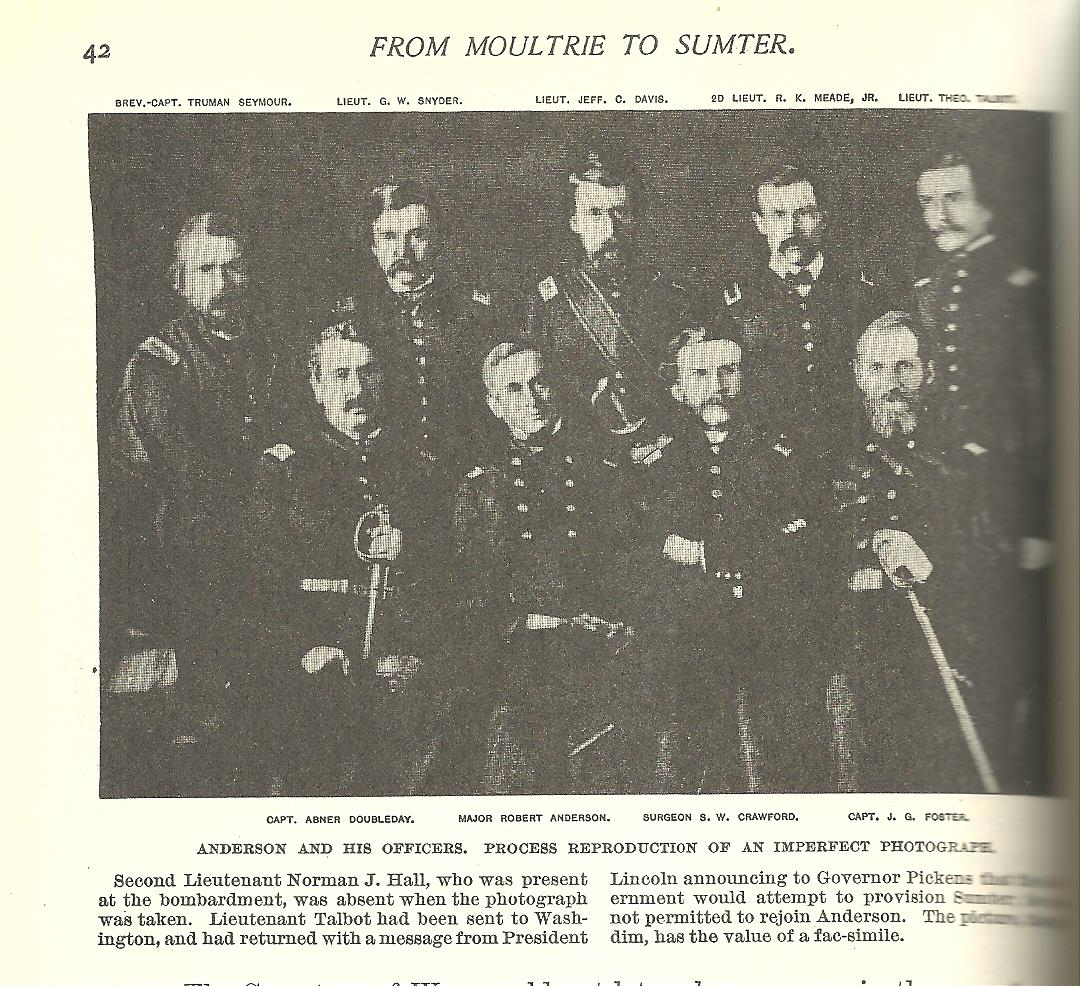
MAjor Robert Anderson and his officers Ft Sumpter South Carolina; Truman Seymour is in the back row at far left

Major Seymour commanded the 5th Regiment of Artillery and the U.S. Camp of Instruction at Harrisburg, Pennsylvania, from December 1861 to March 1862. He was Chief of Artillery for General George A. McCall's division of Pennsylvania Reserves from March 6, 1862, until July 25, 1862. On April 5, 1862, President Abraham Lincoln nominated Seymour for appointment to the grade of brigadier general of volunteers, to rank from April 28, 1862, and the United States Senate confirmed the appointment on that date. The appointment was made official on April 30, 1862.

Seymour served in the Army of the Potomac's V Corps during the Peninsula Campaign of April–July 1862. He commanded the left wing of the Reserves at Mechanicsville on June 26, Gaines' Mill on June 27, Glendale on June 30 and led the division at Malvern Hill on July 1 after McCall was captured at the Battle of Glendale.

After the Peninsula Campaign, the Pennsylvania Reserves joined the III Corps of the Army of Virginia, later I Corps in the Army of the Potomac. Seymour performed well at the battles of Second Bull Run, South Mountain, and Antietam in the latter half of 1862, especially in his brigade's capture of Frosttown Gap, Maryland, on September 14. Seymour took command of the Reserves after Brig. Gen. George G. Meade became acting corps commander. He received the brevet from the regular army of lieutenant colonel after South Mountain and that of colonel after Antietam.

After November 18, 1862, General Seymour was sent to the Department of the South where he served as chief of staff to the commanding general from January 8 to April 23, 1863. He led a division on Folly Island, South Carolina, on July 4, participated in the attack on Morris Island on July 10, and commanded the unsuccessful attack on Fort Wagner on July 18. Seymour gained notoriety for this controversial attack. He had placed the 54th Massachusetts Volunteer Infantry in the vanguard of what most thought would be a feckless attack. During the battle, he was seriously wounded by grapeshot there and saw little field duty for the rest of 1863.

=== The Battle of Olustee ===
Maj. Gen. Quincy A. Gillmore, commanding general of the Department of the South, placed Seymour in charge of the newly created District of Florida. The division made an expedition to Florida in February 1864, landing at and taking possession of Jacksonville. Subsequently, Gillmore returned to South Carolina and left Seymour in tactical command.

On February 20, Seymour's force of about 5,500 men met a Confederate force of about 5,000, commanded by Brigadier General Joseph Finegan. The battle took place near the town of Olustee, about 40 miles west of Jacksonville. The ensuing battle produced some of the heaviest losses, by percentage, of any major battle of the war. Although Seymour's division inflicted nearly 1,000 casualties, it received nearly 2,000 in return. General Seymour's force returned, defeated, to Jacksonville, where Union troops retained control until the war ended.

=== The last year of the war ===
After Olustee, General Seymour retained command of the District of Florida until March 28, 1864. He then returned to Virginia and led Robert H. Milroy's former brigade as part of the Third Division of VI Corps in the Battle of the Wilderness that May. He was captured there in a flank attack by Brig. Gen. John B. Gordon, as was Brig. Gen. Alexander Shaler. After his exchange on August 9, Seymour took command of the Third Division of VI Corps, after James B. Ricketts was wounded, in the last stages of the Shenandoah Valley and the final battles of Petersburg, the Sayler's Creek, and the Appomattox Campaign. He was present at General Robert E. Lee's surrender on April 9, 1865.

On January 13, 1866, President Andrew Johnson nominated Seymour for appointment to the brevet grade of major general of volunteers to rank from March 13, 1865 and the United States Senate confirmed the appointment on March 12, 1866. On April 10, 1866, President Johnson nominated Seymour for appointment to the grade of brevet brigadier general in the regular army, to rank from March 13, 1865, and the Senate confirmed the appointment on May 4, 1866.

== Postbellum career ==
Seymour was mustered out of the volunteers on August 24, 1865 but stayed in the Regular United States Army. He served again in the 5th Artillery, and later commanded forts in Florida; Fort Warren, Massachusetts (1869–70); and Fort Preble, Maine (1870–75). He retired from the army on November 1, 1876.

He received the degree of A.M. from Williams College in 1865. Seymour spent his retirement in Europe and died while living in Florence, Italy. He was buried there in the Cimitero Evangelico degli Allori.

Seymour was also a watercolor painter, and his painting became prolific in Europe during his retirement. Although he is believed to have never sold his paintings, his body of work survives in museums and private collections.

== Gallery ==
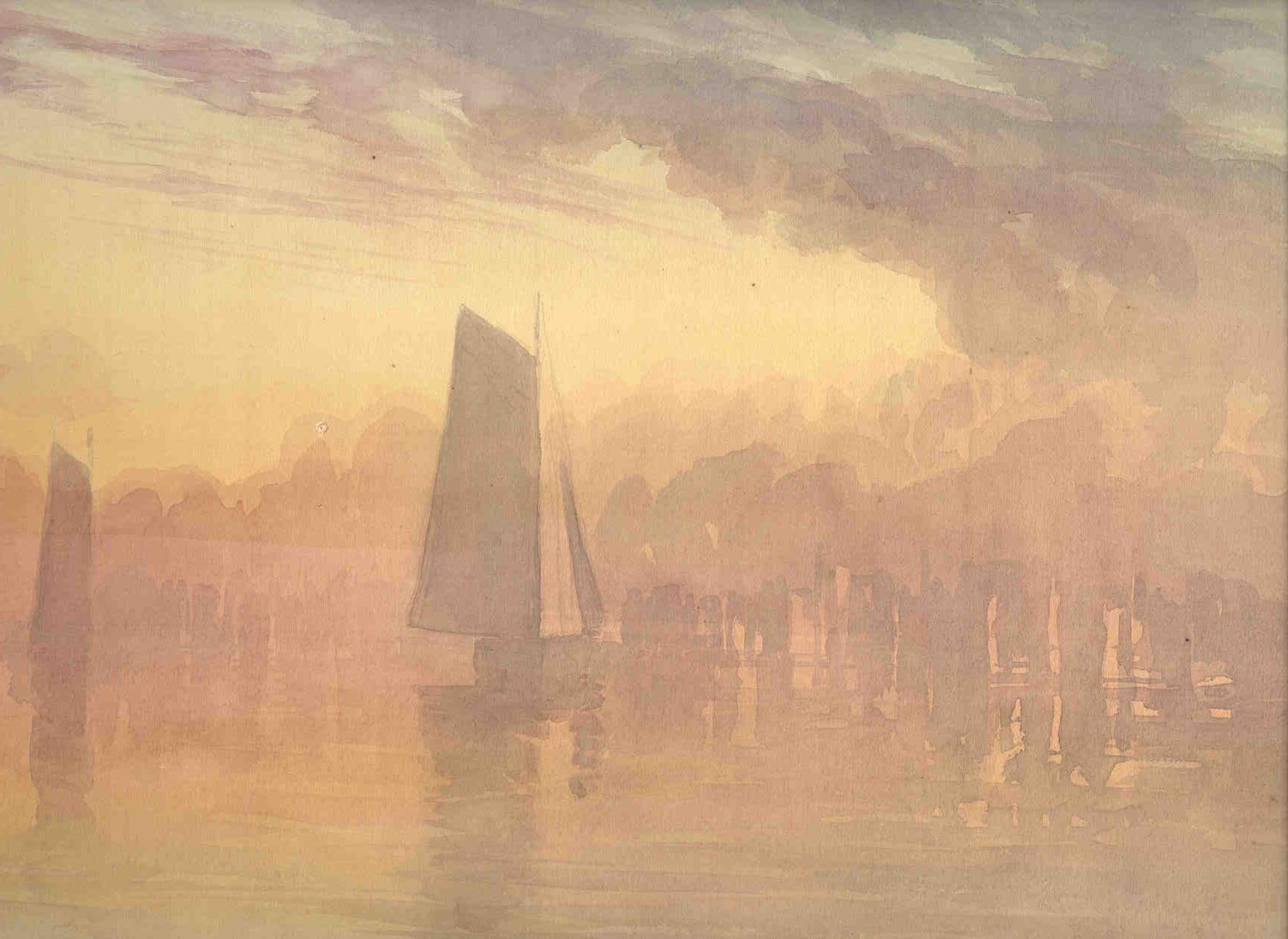
Hudson River: Sailboats at Sunset

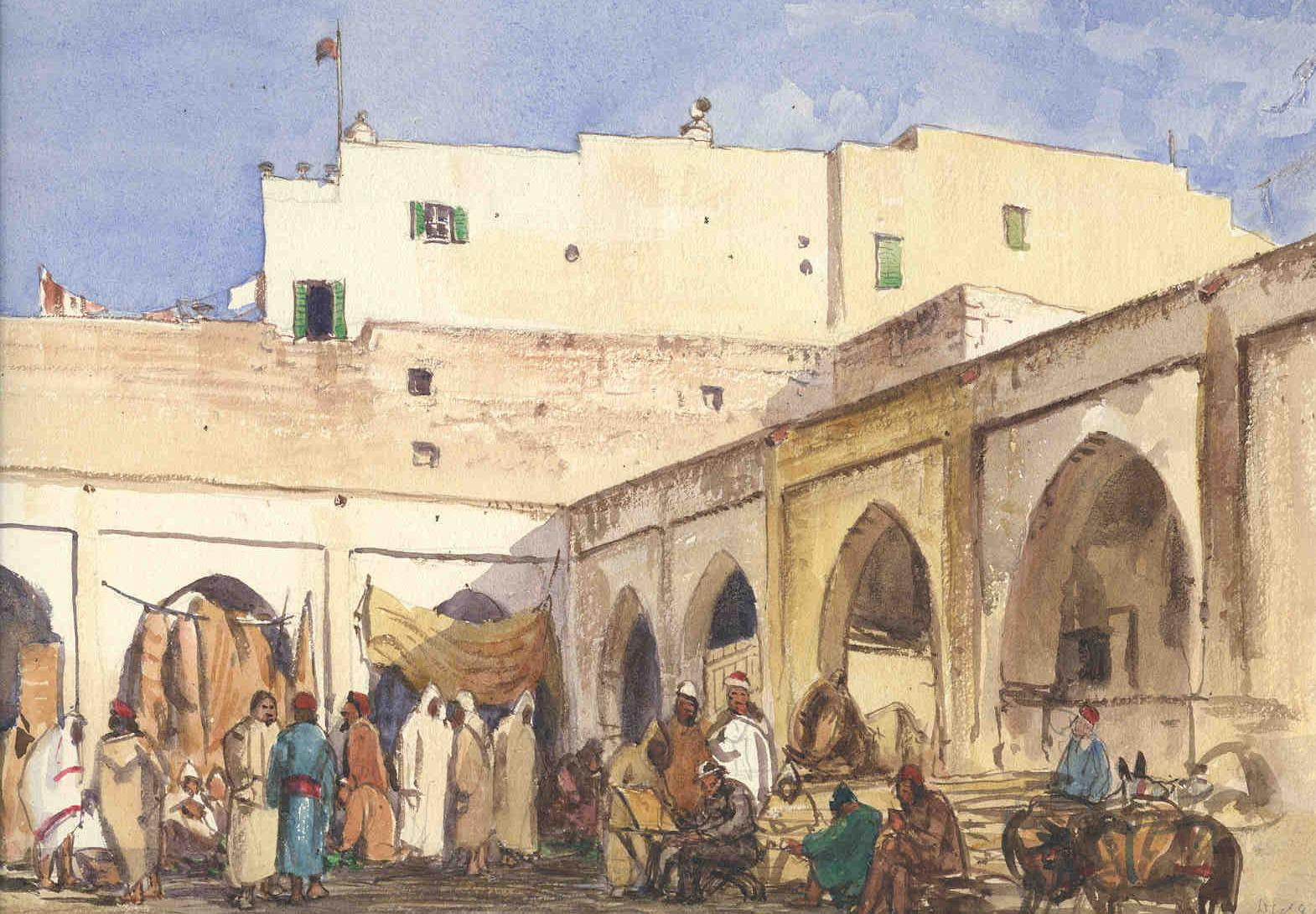
Moroccan Market with Red Flag

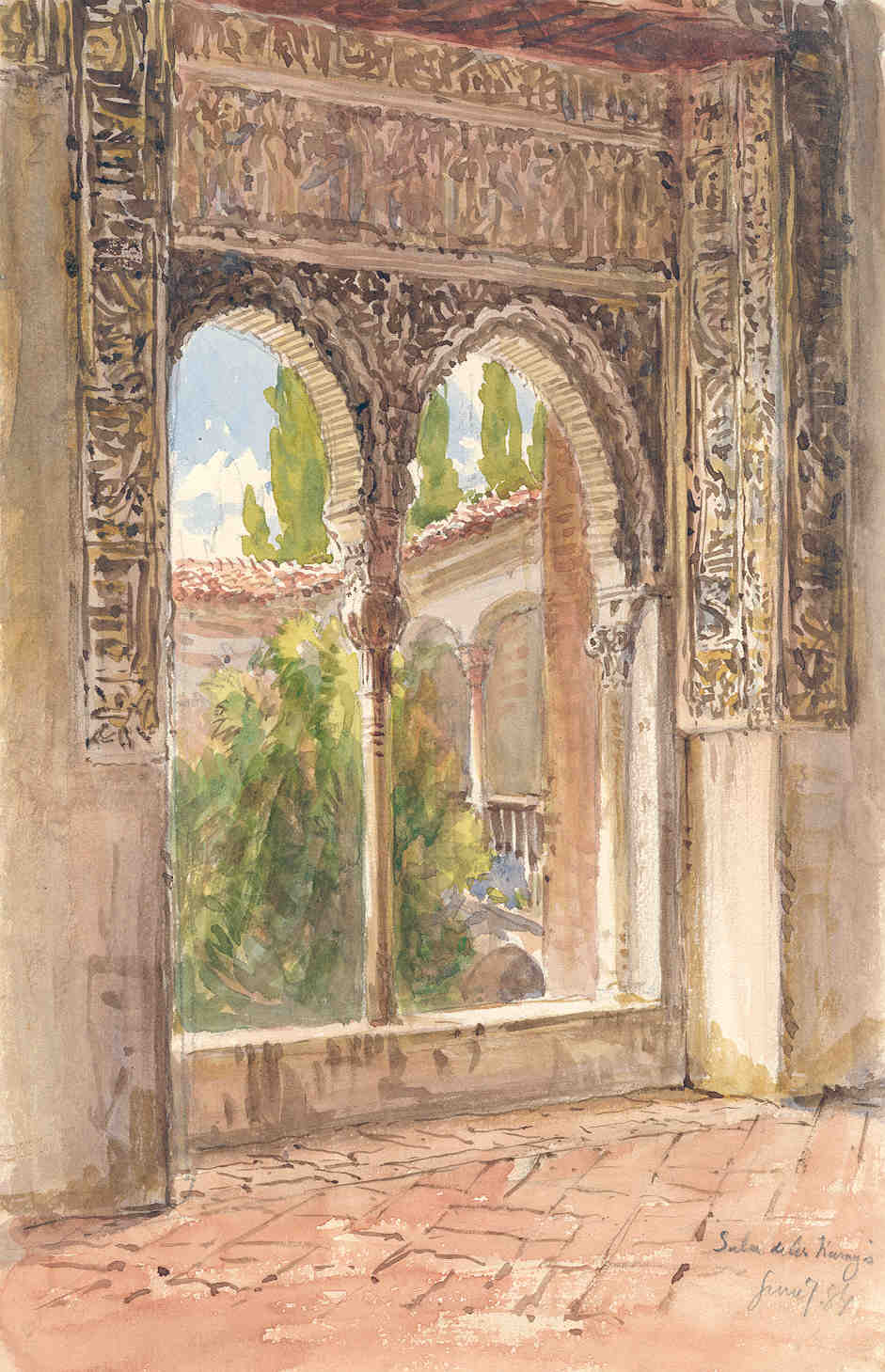
View into Courtyard, Alhambra

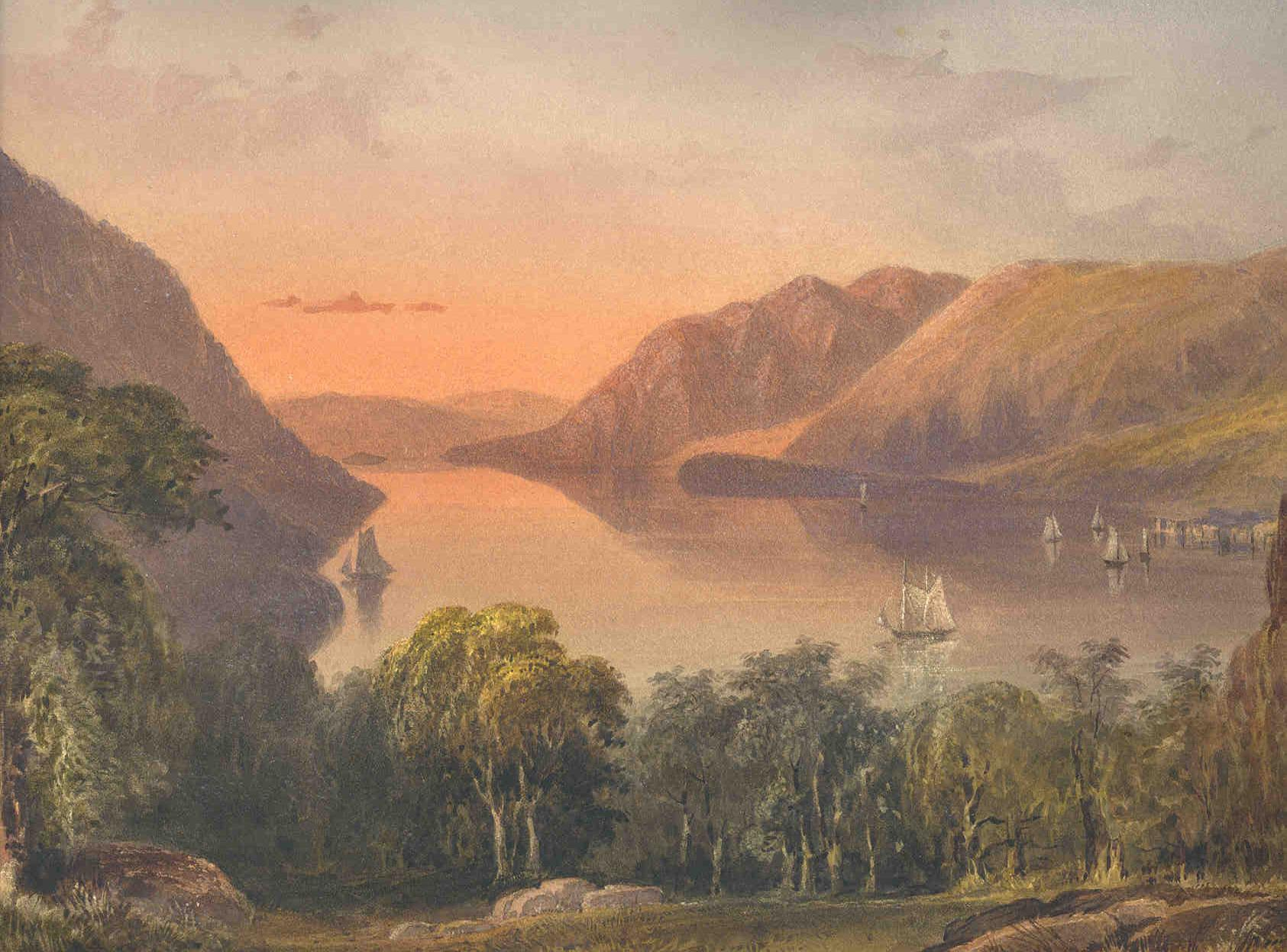
View of the Hudson River from West Point

== See also ==
- List of American Civil War generals (Union)
- John C. Waugh, The Class of 1846, Ballantine Books, New York, 1994.
- Water Color and Drawings by Brevet Maj. Gen. Truman Seymour, Exhibition Catalog, United States Military Academy, Kent Ahrens, 1974.
- The Drawings and Watercolors by Truman Seymour, organized by the Everhart Museum, Scranton, 1986.
