= List of shipwrecks in May 1864 =

The list of shipwrecks in May 1864 includes ships sunk, foundered, grounded, or otherwise lost during May 1864.

== 1 May ==
List of shipwrecks: 1 May 1864
Ship	State	Description
Emma	United States	American Civil War, Red River Campaign: The 385-ton sidewheel paddle steamer was captured and burned by a Confederate States Army artillery battery on the Red River of the South near Fort DeRussy, Louisiana.
Latona	United Kingdom	The ship collided with a brig off Flamborough Head, Yorkshire and was abandoned in a sinking condition. She was on a voyage from Middlesbrough, Yorkshire to London.
Medina	United Kingdom	The brig was driven ashore at Galata Point, near Gallipoli, Ottoman Empire. She was on a voyage from Nicolayev, Russia to an English port. She was refloated with assistance of 5 May.
Thomas Hannlon	United Kingdom	The ship was driven ashore at Fairlight, Sussex. She was refloated with the assistance of three smacks and resumed her voyage to Cardiff, Glamorgan.
Volunteer	United Kingdom	The brig was wrecked on the Gunfleet Sands, in the North Sea off the coast of Essex. Her crew were rescued. She was on a voyage from South Shields, County Durham to London.
Unnamed	Sweden	The ship, a brig or schooner, was driven ashore on St Agnes, Isles of Scilly, United Kingdom. She was on a voyage from Málaga, Spain to Queenstown, County Cork, United Kingdom

== 2 May ==
List of shipwrecks: 2 May 1864
Ship	State	Description
Aurora	United Kingdom	The steamship was driven ashore 2 nautical miles (3.7 km) north of St. Margaret's Bay, Kent. She was on a voyage from London to Genoa, Italy. She was refloated.
Garman, or Janverm	United Kingdom	The barque was driven ashore and wrecked near Morthoe, Devon. Her crew were rescued.
John F. Butler	United Kingdom	The ship ran aground on the Holm Sand, in the North Sea off the coast of Suffolk. She was on a voyage from Cardiff, Glamorgan to Great Yarmouth, Norfolk. She was refloated and completed her voyage.
Shand	United Kingdom	The barque ran aground on the Sambracus Shoal, in the Dardanelles. She was refloated.

== 3 May ==
List of shipwrecks: 3 May 1864
Ship	State	Description
City Belle	United States	American Civil War, Red River Campaign: While carrying between 400 and 725 troops of the 120th Ohio Infantry Regiment (Union Army), the sidewheel paddle steamer was ambushed by Confederate States Army forces at Snaggy Point on the Red River of the South about 20 to 40 nautical miles (37 to 74 km) upstream of Fort DeRussy, Louisiana. A Confederate artillery shell struck her boiler, wrecking her and scalding to death about a third of the troops aboard. About 200 troops jumped overboard and swam to safety.
Express, or Experiment	Confederate States of America	American Civil War, Union blockade: Attempting to run the Union blockade, the schooner, carrying a cargo of cotton from Galveston, Texas, to Tampico, Mexico, was captured and burned in the Gulf of Mexico off the coast of Texas by the armed screw steamer USS Virginia (United States Navy).
Hornet	United States	The extreme clipper caught fire in the Pacific Ocean and was abandoned by all 31 people on board, who took to three boats. She was on a voyage from New York to San Francisco, California. Hornet sank the next day. One boat with fifteen people on board reached Lapahoehoe, Hawaii on 15 June. No trace of the other two boats after 23 May.
Jean Goujon	France	The ship was on a voyage from Havana, Cuba, to Havre de Grâce, Seine-Inférieure, with a cargo of sugar, when, in a storm at night, her captain mistook his position and steered south of the rocks he thought were the Les Casquets. The rocks were, in fact, the Écréhous and by steering south he accidentally ran the ship onto the Ecropes Rocks off Jersey, Channel Islands. Her crew were rescued.
Newport	United Kingdom	The steamship, a luggage boat, caught fire off Birkenhead, Cheshire and was scuttled.
Pauline	Confederate States of America	American Civil War: The 135-ton sidewheel paddle steamer burned at Shreveport.

== 4 May ==
List of shipwrecks: 4 May 1864
Ship	State	Description
Hope	United Kingdom	The sloop was driven ashore and wrecked at Seaham, County Durham. Her crew were rescued. She was on a voyage from Wells-next-the-Sea, Norfolk to Seaham.
Kurea	United Kingdom	The brig was driven ashore at Cape Henlopen, Delaware, United States. She was on a voyage from Cienfuegos, Cuba to Philadelphia, Pennsylvania, United States.
Lavinia	United Kingdom	The sloop sank in the Humber.

== 5 May ==
List of shipwrecks: 5 May 1864
Ship	State	Description
USS Covington	United States Navy	American Civil War, Red River Campaign: Severely damaged in combat with Confederate States Army infantry on the Red River of the South, the gunboat was burned by her crew off Alexandria, Louisiana, Confederate States of America to prevent her capture by Confederate forces. Her commanding officer and 32 of her crew avoided capture and escaped to Alexandria.
John Warner	United States Army	American Civil War, Red River Campaign: Damaged in combat with [Confederate States Army infantry and artillery on the Red River of the South near Marksville, Louisiana, while transporting 250 men of the 56th Ohio Infantry Regiment (Union Army), the 391-ton sidewheel transport ran aground and sank with about 34 men of the regiment killed and another 150 captured.
USS Signal	United States Navy	American Civil War, Red River Campaign: Severely damaged in combat with Confederate States Army infantry on the Red River of the South, the gunboat was burned by her crew off Alexandria, Louisiana, to prevent her capture by Confederate forces. The Confederates captured her crew.
Tay	United Kingdom	The barque was holed by ice and sank in British North American waters. Her thirteen crew were rescued by Lord Byron (United Kingdom). Tay was on a voyage from Cardiff, Glamorgan to Quebec City, Province of Canada, British North America.
William Walker	United Kingdom	The brig was driven ashore on Ven, Sweden. She was on a voyage from Danzig to London. She was refloated and resumed her voyage.

== 6 May ==
List of shipwrecks: 6 May 1864
Ship	State	Description
Aurora	United Kingdom	The brig ran aground on the Lillegrund, off the Danish coast. She was on a voyage from Stockholm, Sweden to Hull, Yorkshire. She was refloated with assistance and resumed her voyage.
USS Commodore Jones	United States Navy	American Civil War: The gunboat was blown to pieces by a 2,000-pound (910 kg) electrically-detonated Confederate mine on the James River in Virginia, killing 40 of her crew and wounding 29.
Henriette Sophia	United Kingdom	The ship foundered in the North Sea 120 nautical miles (220 km) west of Domesnes, Norway. Her crew were rescued by a Norwegian vessel. She was on a voyage from Sunderland, County Durham to Kronstadt, Russia.
John and Jean	United Kingdom	The schooner was driven ashore north of Berwick upon Tweed, Northumberland. Her crew were rescued. She was on a voyage from Sunderland to Perth.

== 7 May ==
List of shipwrecks: 7 May 1864
Ship	State	Description
Holly	Russia	The barque ran ashore near Hoburgen, Sweden. She was on a voyage from Sunderland, County Durham, United Kingdom to Kronstadt.
Idas	United Kingdom	The schooner was driven ashore and wrecked at Newchang, China.
CSS Raleigh	Confederate States Navy	American Civil War, Union blockade: The casemate ironclad suffered severe damage when she ran aground on the bar at the mouth of the Cape Fear River on the coast of North Carolina and was destroyed by her crew to prevent her capture by Union forces.
USS Shawsheen	United States Navy	American Civil War: The gunboat was disabled and captured by Confederate States Army troops on the James River in Virginia, Confederate States of America. The Confederate troops set her on fire when two United States Navy ironclads approached, and she exploded when the flames reached her ammunition magazine.
Prade	United Kingdom	The sloop foundered off Greypoint. Her three crew were rescued by Petrel (United Kingdom. Prade was on a voyage from Troon, Ayrshire to Newry, County Antrim.

== 8 May ==
List of shipwrecks: 8 May 1864
Ship	State	Description
Cochrane	United Kingdom	The steamship ran aground at Sunderland, County Durham. She was on a voyage from Sunderland to London. She was refloated and put back to Sunderland.
Sophia	United Kingdom	American Civil War, Union blockade: While under the control of a United States Navy prize crew, the schooner foundered in a heavy gale off the coast of the United States. She had been captured by the schooner USS Dan Smith (United States Navy) on 3 March.
Stephen Glover	United States	The full-rigged ship ran aground on the James and Mary Sand, in the Hooghly River. She was on a voyage from Calcutta, India to Boston, Massachusetts. She was refloated and put back to Calcutta.

== 9 May ==
List of shipwrecks: 9 May 1864
Ship	State	Description
Abbey	United Kingdom	The ship was wrecked at Cape Rosier, Maine, United States. She was on a voyage from London to Quebec City, Province of Canada, British North America.
Cossack	United Kingdom	The steamship ran aground on the Swinebottoms, in the Baltic Sea. She was on a voyage from Hull, Yorkshire to Saint Petersburg, Russia. She was refloated on 12 May and taken in to Copenhagen, Denmark for repairs.
Dame Durden	United Kingdom	The ship was driven ashore and wrecked at Cape Charles, Virginia, Confederate States of America. She was on a voyage from Liverpool, Lancashire to Baltimore, Maryland, United States.
Florist	United Kingdom	The brig was wrecked on the Long Bank, off the coast of County Wexford. Her crew were rescued by the tug Ruby (United Kingdom).
HDMS Nils Juel	Royal Danish Navy	Second Schleswig War, Battle of Heligoland: The frigate was damaged in battle off Heligoland.
SMS Radetzky	Austrian Navy	Second Schleswig War, Battle of Heligoland: The Radetzky-class frigate was damaged in battle off Heligoland with the loss of five of her crew.
Rover's Bride	United Kingdom	The sloop ran aground on the Longsand, in the North Sea off the coast of Essex. She was on a voyage from Terschelling, Friesland, Netherlands to Teignmouth, Devon. She was refloated but ran aground on the Girdler Shoal and was abandoned. Her crew got aboard the Girdler Lightship ( Trinity House) She subsequently floated off and came ashore at Foulness Island, Essex on 13 May.
SMS Schwarzenburg	Austrian Navy	SMS Schwarzenburg Second Schleswig War: Battle of Heligoland: The frigate ran aground, was set afire and severely damaged in battle off Heligoland with the loss of 31 of her crew.
Silver Cloud No. 2	United States	Carrying a cargo of United States Government supplies, the 287-ton sternwheel paddle steamer struck a rock and sank in shallow water in the Cumberland River in Tennessee, Confederate States of America. She was refloated the next day.

== 10 May ==
List of shipwrecks: 10 May 1864
Ship	State	Description
USS Carondelet	United States Navy	American Civil War, Red River Campaign: The ironclad gunboat ran aground on the Red River of the South upstream of Alexandria, Louisiana, Confederate States of America. She was refloated.
Harriet A. Weed	United States Army	American Civil War: Carrying 13 officers and 20 enlisted men of the 3rd United States Colored Infantry Regiment (United States Army), the sidewheel transport sank less than a minute after striking two Confederate mines on the St. Johns River near Mandarin Point and the mouth of Cedar Creek, Florida, Confederate States of America. One officer was blown 20 feet (6.1 m) into the air, five men were killed, and the ship was a total loss.
Jane	United Kingdom	The schooner was driven ashore and severely damaged at Seaham, County Durham. She was on a voyage from Colchester, Essex to Seaham. She was refloated and taken in to Seaham.
USS Mound City	United States Navy	American Civil War, Red River Campaign: The ironclad gunboat ran aground on the Red River of the South upstream of Alexandria, Louisiana. She was refloated.
Invercauld, and/or Minerva	United Kingdom	The barque Invercauld left Melbourne, Victoria for Callao, Peru on 2 May. During a severe gale south of New Zealand, the ship hit the northwestern tip of Auckland Island and swiftly broke up. Of the 25 crew, six were lost in the wreck, the survivors were washed ashore and subsisted on plant roots and shellfish for a little over a year. By the time of their rescue only three of the crew were still alive: Captain George Dalgarno, Ship's Mate Andrew Smith, and one seaman. They were rescued on 20 May 1865 by Julian (Peru). Contemporary sources have somewhat different information, referring to Minerva being wrecked in identical circumstances, with four survivors being rescued on 25 March 1865. James Teer, a survivor of the shipwreck of General Grant recorded that in April 1867 the survivors found a stave on the mainland on a point inside Enderby Island. On the stave was written in charcoal Minerva - 4 men, 1 officer - Leith - May 10th, 1864 - March 25th, 1865. Teer notes from the relative position of the words, our impression was, that the word Leith had reference to the man or men, and not to the Minerva.

== 12 May ==
List of shipwrecks: 12 May 1864
Ship	State	Description
Black Swan	United Kingdom	The steamship struck the pier at North Shields, Northumberland and was severely damaged. She was on a voyage from North Shields to London.
Blyth	United Kingdom	The ship ran aground and was severely damaged at Bayonne, Basses-Pyrénées, severely injuring four of her crew. She was on a voyage from Sunderland, County Durham to Bayonne.
Bright, or Wright	United Kingdom	The brig ran aground on the Sizewell Bank, in the North Sea off the coast of Suffolk. She was on a voyage from Hartlepool, County Durham to London. She was refloated and beached at Orford Haven, Suffolk. She was refloated on 16 May.
Honest	United Kingdom	The ship ran aground and sank on the Long Banks, in the Irish Sea off the coast of County Wexford. She was on a voyage from Liverpool, Lancashire to Nassau, Bahamas.
Pierre	France	The ship was wrecked at Le Croisic, Loire-Inférieure. She was on a voyage from Newport, Monmouthshire, United Kingdom to Nantes, Loire-Inférieure.
Sherwood Ranger	United Kingdom	The brig was driven ashore and wrecked on the Kettleness Steel, on the coast of Yorkshire. Her crew were rescued. She was on a voyage from South Shields, County Durham to Lisbon, Portugal.

== 13 May ==
List of shipwrecks: 13 May 1864
Ship	State	Description
Lydia	United Kingdom	The brig was run down and sunk 20 nautical miles (37 km) south east by south of Flamborough Head, Yorkshire by the steamship Lopede (Spain).
Orient	United Kingdom	The barque was driven ashore and wrecked at Poorhead, County Cork. She was on a voyage from the Brass River, Africa to Liverpool, Lancashire. She was refloated and taken in to Queenstown, County Cork for temporary repairs. Orient was subsequently towed to Liverpool for permanent repairs.

== 14 May ==
List of shipwrecks: 14 May 1864
Ship	State	Description
Anna Eliza	United Kingdom	American Civil War, Union blockade: The sloop was on a blockade-running voyage from the Santee River in South Carolina, Confederate States of America to Nassau with a cargo of turpentine spirits when she was discovered dismasted and waterlogged in the North Atlantic Ocean off North Carolina (34°35′N 74°55′W) by the mortar gunboat USS Sea Foam (United States Navy).
Elizabeth Gillespie	United Kingdom	The ship ran aground at the entrance to the Norson Inlet, New Jersey, United States. All on board were rescued. She was on a voyage from Londonderry to Philadelphia, Pennsylvania, United States.
Jenny Jones	United States	The schooner was stranded on Peacock Spit while sailing up the Columbia River between Oregon and Washington Territory.

== 15 May ==
List of shipwrecks: 15 May 1864
Ship	State	Description
East London	United Kingdom	The ship was abandoned in the Atlantic Ocean. Her crew were rescued by Jacques Chaeur (France) and she was set afire. East London was on a voyage from Rangoon, Burma to an English port.

== 16 May ==
List of shipwrecks: 16 May 1864
Ship	State	Description
John Williams	United Kingdom	The barque was wrecked on a reef off Danger Island in the Cook Islands and sank without loss of life.

== 17 May ==
List of shipwrecks: 17 May 1864
Ship	State	Description
Marchioness	United Kingdom	The brigantine parted her anchor cable off the coast of Taranaki, New Zealand during a heavy swell and was wrecked on a rocky shore between Oakura and Cape Egmont without loss of life.

== 18 May ==
List of shipwrecks: 18 May 1864
Ship	State	Description
George Latimer	United States	American Civil War: The 198-ton schooner, carrying a cargo of flour, lard, bread, and kerosene, from Baltimore, Maryland, to Recife, Brazil, was captured and burned in the North Atlantic Ocean (34°55′N 55°13′W_ by the screw sloop-of-war CSS Florida (Confederate States Navy).
Port Glasgow	United Kingdom	The ship ran aground on the Beaufort Flats, in the Saint Lawrence River. She was on a voyage from Quebec City. Province of Canada, British North America to Gloucester. She was refloated and resumed her voyage.
Runnymede	United Kingdom	The ship driven ashore and wrecked at Cape Broyle, Newfoundland, British North America. She was on a voyage from Saint John's, Newfoundland to Pernambuco, Brazil.
St. Joseph	Norway	The ship ran aground on the Lapsand. She was on a voyage from Newcastle upon Tyne, Northumberland, United Kingdom to the Øresund. She was refloated and taken in to Helsingør, Denmark.

== 19 May ==
List of shipwrecks: 19 May 1864
Ship	State	Description
Eden	United Kingdom	The barque was driven ashore at Redcar, Yorkshire. She was refloated and resumed her voyage.
Elizabeth and Mary	United Kingdom	The sloop was driven ashore at Marske-by-the-Sea, Yorkshire. She was on a voyage from Newcastle upon Tyne, Northumberland to London.
Fratellianza	Italy	The brig was abandoned in the Atlantic Ocean. Her crew were rescued by Indefatigable (United Kingdom). Fratellianza was on a voyage from New York, United States to Antwerp, Belgium. The ship was discovered in a wrecked condition on 28 May by Maryland ( (flag) United States and was set afire.
La Plata	United Kingdom	The brig ran aground on the Barrel of Beef Rock, off Trinidad. She was on a voyage from Cedros Bay to "Jemander".
Star of Victoria	(United Kingdom of Great Britain and Ireland) Tasmania	The barque was wrecked at the mouth of the New River in southern New Zealand. She was being towed by the tug Aphrasia ( (United Kingdom of Great Britain and Ireland) New Zealand) towards Foveaux Strait which was in heavy swell, when the towrope parted. The tug was unable to keep the barque on course and it struck rocks, holing her below the waterline. All passengers and crew were landed safely.

== 20 May ==
List of shipwrecks: 20 May 1864
Ship	State	Description
Australian	unknown	The brig was deliberately run ashore at Akaroa, New Zealand after she was holed.
Ino	(United Kingdom of Great Britain and Ireland) Guernsey	The ship was driven ashore at Huntcliffe, Yorkshire. She was on a voyage from South Shields, County Durham to Havre de Grâce, Seine-Inférieure, France. She was refloated and taken in to Hartlepool, County Durham.

== 21 May ==
List of shipwrecks: 21 May 1864
Ship	State	Description
Era	(United Kingdom of Great Britain and Ireland) New Zealand	The schooner was wrecked on a sandbar at Maketu without loss of life.
Hermann Wedell	Norway	The brig ran aground in the River Tyne. She was on a voyage from Christiania to North Shields, Northumberland, United Kingdom. She was refloated.
Lanarkshire	United Kingdom	The ship ran aground at São Vicente, Cape Verde Islands. She was on a voyage from Swansea, Glamorgan to São Vicente. She was refloated.
Nile	United States	The 650-ton screw steamer exploded at Detroit, Michigan, with the loss of thirteen lives.

== 22 May ==
List of shipwrecks: 22 May 1864
Ship	State	Description
USS Columbine	United States Navy	Illustration of the capture of USS Columbine. American Civil War, Battle of Horse Landing: The sidewheel paddle steamer was ambushed by Confederate States Army forces on the St. Johns River in Florida, Confederate States of America. She ran aground, and was captured by Confederate troops. Confederate forces burned her to prevent her recapture by the gunboat USS Ottawa (United States Navy), which was 5 nautical miles (9.3 km) upriver.
Iona	United Kingdom	The ship ran aground on the Corton Sands, in the North Sea off the coast of Suffolk. She was on a voyage from South Shields, County Durham to London. She was refloated and taken in to Great Yarmouth, Norfolk.
Sting Ray	United Kingdom	American Civil War, Union blockade: The schooner was grounded by her crew on the coast of Texas, Confederate States of America after they overpowered a prize crew placed aboard her by the gunboat USS Kineo (United States Navy) earlier in the day. The prize crew had gotten drunk on liquor the crew of Sting Ray gave them.

== 23 May ==
List of shipwrecks: 23 May 1864
Ship	State	Description
Lawton	United Kingdom	The sloop ran aground at Lindisfarne, Northumberland. She was on a voyage from South Shields, County Durham to West Haven. She was refloated and beached.
Protector	Norway	The full-rigged ship struck an iceberg and sank in the Atlantic Ocean. Her crew took to tow boats; they were rescued by the steamship North American (United Kingdom).

== 24 May ==
List of shipwrecks: 24 May 1864
Ship	State	Description
Hamon	United Kingdom	The brig was driven ashore and wrecked on Tenerife, Canary Islands before 28 May. Her nine crew survived. She was on a voyage from London to Demerara, British Guiana.
Lebanon	United States	American Civil War: The steamer was captured and burned by Confederate States Army troops at Ford's Landing, Arkansas.
Three unidentified transports	United States	American Civil War: The transports came under fire by Confederate States Army artillery on the Mississippi River at Daniel Session's Plantation. One careened over and was hauled to the river's bank, while the other two were disabled and set afire.

== 25 May ==
List of shipwrecks: 25 May 1864
Ship	State	Description
Clementina	United Kingdom	The ship was abandoned in the Atlantic Ocean. She was on a voyage from New York, United States to Bristol, Gloucestershire.
Martha	United Kingdom	The schooner was wrecked off Vlieland, Friesland, Netherlands. She was on a voyage from Runcorn, Cheshire to Harlingen, Friesland.
Visalia	United States	The 76-ton screw steamer struck a snag and sank at Hayes Bend on the Sacramento River, 3 nautical miles (5.6 km) upstream of Nicholas, California, Confederate States of America.

== 26 May ==
List of shipwrecks: 26 May 1864
Ship	State	Description
Boston	United States Army	American Civil War: Aground on the Ashepoo River in South Carolina, Confederate States of America since around midnight on 25 May with the loss of seven or eight lives while transporting 300 personnel of the 34th United States Colored Infantry Regiment, 90 cavalrymen, and 60 horses (all Union Army), the 574-, 590-, or 630-ton sidewheel transport took 70 to 80 shell hits and was burned prevent her capture by Confederate forces.
Ellen	United Kingdom	The ship was wrecked at Braganza Point, Brazil. Her crew were rescued. She was on a voyage from Newcastle upon Tyne, Northumberland to Pará, Brazil.
Graham's Town	United Kingdom	The ship was destroyed by fire at sea. She was on a voyage from Algoa Bay to London.

== 27 May ==
List of shipwrecks: 27 May 1864
Ship	State	Description
John Parkinson	United Kingdom	The ship was wrecked at Inagua, the Bahamas. She was on a voyage from Jacmel, Haiti to the Isles of Scilly. She was refloated and taken in to Matthew Town, where she was condemned.
Lebanon	United States	American Civil War: The 225-ton sidewheel transport was burned by Confederate forces on the Mississippi River at Greenville, Mississippi, Confederate States of America. She had been captured on the Mississippi about 10 nautical miles (19 km) downstream of Greenville near Ford's Landing on 25 May by a yawl manned by men of the 4th Missouri Regiment.
Sarah	United Kingdom	The sloop sank off Southport, Lancashire. Her crew were rescued.
Wallace	United Kingdom	The ship was wrecked near Sulina, Ottoman Empire. She was on a voyage from Sulina to Falmouth, Cornwall or Queenstown, County Cork. She had been refloated by 14 June and towed in to Sulina.

== 28 May ==
List of shipwrecks: 28 May 1864
Ship	State	Description
Belle Creole	United States	The sidewheel paddle steamer burned in a wharf fire at New Orleans, Louisiana, Confederate States of America.
Black Hawk	United States	The 57- or 211-ton sidewheel paddle steamer burned in a wharf fire at New Orleans.
Empire Parish	United States	The 279-ton sidewheel paddle steamer burned in a wharf fire at New Orleans.
Fawn	United States	The sidewheel paddle steamer burned in a wharf fire at New Orleans.
General Finegan	Confederate States of America	American Civil War, Union blockade: Carrying a cargo of cotton and turpentine, the sloop was captured and destroyed in the Gulf of Mexico off Florida just north of the Chassahowitzka River near Homosassa Bay by two boats from the schooner USS Ariel (United States Navy).
Louisiana Bell	United States	The 89-ton sternwheel paddle steamer burned in a wharf fire at New Orleans.
Meteor	United States	The 417-ton sidewheel paddle steamer burned in a wharf fire at New Orleans.
New Orleans	United States	The 198-ton sidewheel paddle steamer burned in a wharf fire at New Orleans.
Time and Tide	United States	The 130-ton sternwheel paddle steamer burned in a wharf fire at New Orleans.

== 29 May ==
List of shipwrecks: 29 May 1864
Ship	State	Description
Frank Pierce	United States	The ship was driven ashore and wrecked at Stanley, Falkland Islands. Her crew were rescued on 7 June by Charles Lambert (United States).
Morning Star	United States	The ship was wrecked on the Aleste Reef. She was on a voyage from Manila, Spanish East Indies to New York.
HMS Ringdove	Royal Navy	The Vigilant-class gunvessel ran aground on the Bombay Shoal, off Palawan Island, Singapore, Straits Settlements. She was on a voyage from Hong Kong to Labuan.

== 30 May ==
List of shipwrecks: 30 May 1864
Ship	State	Description
Clara Ames, or Clara Eames	United States	American Civil War: Ambushed by Confederate States Army troops on the Mississippi River about 3.5 nautical miles (6.5 km) downstream of Columbia, Arkansas, the 105-ton sternwheel transport ran aground about 4 nautical miles (7.4 km) upstream of the Sunnyside Plantation, Arkansas, and was captured by the Confederates, who burned her to the waterline.
Condor	United Kingdom	The ship was driven ashore at Breaksea Point, Glamorgan. She was on a voyage from Cardiff, Glamorgan to Villanova. She was refloated the next day.
Dardanelles	France	The brig ran aground on a reef off Barbuda. She was on a voyage from Martinique to Bordeaux, Gironde. She was refloated and put into Antigua the next day, where she was condemned.
Fortunate	Confederate States of America	American Civil War, Union blockade: After the sloop, carrying a cargo of cotton and turpentine, was captured and taken in tow by the screw steamer USS Bermuda (United States Navy), she parted her hawser in the North Atlantic Ocean off Florida (27°53′N 79°45′W) and sank.
Louisa	(United Kingdom of Great Britain and Ireland) Straits Settlements	The brig was attacked by a pirate junk, set afire and sunk off Hainan, China. Several crew abandoned ship, others were murdered. Five survivors were rescued by the barque Young Greek (United Kingdom). Louisa was on a voyage from Hong Kong to Singapore.
Theodor	Prussia	The ship foundered in the North Sea. Her crew were rescued by Norwegian pilot boat. She was on a voyage from Torrevieja, Spain to Mandal, Norway.

== 31 May ==
List of shipwrecks: 31 May 1864
Ship	State	Description
Conception	United Kingdom	The ship was wrecked at the mouth of the Guadalquivir. Her crew were rescued.

== Unknown date ==
List of shipwrecks: Unknown date in May 1864
Ship	State	Description
Acadienne	(United Kingdom of Great Britain and Ireland) British North America	The ship was wrecked at Cape Hatteras, North Carolina, Confederate States of America.
Arnoldo	Italy	The ship caught fire at Milazzo, Sicily and was scuttled.
Australia	United States	The clipper was wrecked near "Ayab".
Brinelle	United Kingdom	The barque was driven ashore 25 nautical miles (46 km) from Sandy Hook, New Jersey, United States. Her crew were rescued. She was on a voyage from South Shields, County Durham to Grimsby, Lincolnshire and New York, United States. She was refloated and taken in to New York, where she arrived on 19 May.
Caroline	United Kingdom	The ship foundered off Cape Wrath, Caithness. She was on a voyage from Liverpool, Lancashire to Copenhagen, Denmark.
Chieftain	United Kingdom	The ship was wrecked in the Thousand Islands, Netherlands East Indies before 28 May. Her crew were rescued. She was on a voyage from Billiton to Batavia.
CSS Doubloon	Confederate States Navy	American Civil War, Red River Campaign: The 293-ton sidewheel paddle steamer was scuttled in the Red River of the South in Louisiana. She was refloated and repaired.
Drover	Confederate States of America	American Civil War, Red River Campaign: The 26-ton sidewheel ferry was probably scuttled as a blockship in the Red River of the South at Shreveport, Louisiana. She was probably refloated.
Elizabeth	United Kingdom	The ship was driven ashore and wrecked at Cap May, New Jersey. She was on a voyage from Londonderry to Philadelphia, Pennsylvania, United States.
Lavinia	United Kingdom	The ship was driven ashore at Narva, Russia.
Lillian	(United Kingdom of Great Britain and Ireland) British North America	The ship was driven ashore on Cape Sable Island, Nova Scotia before 21 May.
Marys	United Kingdom	The ship sprang a leak and was beached at Cairnryan, Wigtownshire.
Melita	United Kingdom	The ship was wrecked at Newchang. She was on a voyage from Shanghai to Newchang.
Nelson	United Kingdom	The barque was wrecked on the African coast. She was on a voyage from Livorno, Italy to Falmouth, Cornwall.
Netherby	United Kingdom	The ship was driven ashore in the Pescadores, Formosa before 18 May. She was on a voyage from Foochow, China to London. She was refloated and resumed her voyage. No further trace, presumed subsequently foundered with the loss of all hands.
Pioneer	United Kingdom	The steamship was lost whilst on a voyage from Kurrachee to Bombay, India.
Pontiac	United States	The 68-ton sidewheel paddle steamer exploded at Grand Haven, Michigan, killing three people.
Rosette	United Kingdom	The steamship struck rocks and was severely damaged at Hartlepool, County Durham during her sea trials. She was refloated and towed in to West Hartlepool.
Sicilian	(United Kingdom of Great Britain and Ireland) New Zealand	The schooner left the Chatham Islands bound for New Zealand's South Island. No further trace.
St. Oswin	United Kingdom	The barque was driven ashore near Dungeness, Kent. She was on a voyage from North Shields, Northumberland to Singapore, Straits Settlements. She was refloated on 13 May and put in to The Downs.
Susanna	United Kingdom	The ship collided with Lucy Caroline (United Kingdom) and sank at Matamoros, Mexico.
Wallace	United Kingdom	The ship was wrecked at Sulina, Ottoman Empire. Her crew were rescued. She was on a voyage from Sulina to an English port.
