= Lola Sánchez (Confederate spy) =

American Confederate spy

- Born: María Dolores Sánchez; September 15, 1844; Armstrong, Florida, US
- Died: October 10, 1895 (aged 51); St. Augustine, Florida, US
- Burial place: Saint Ambrose Cemetery, Elkton, Florida
- Military career
- Allegiance: Confederate States of America Confederate Army
- Conflicts: American Civil War

Lola Sánchez (1844–1895) was one of three sisters who became spies for the Confederate Army during the American Civil War. Sánchez became upset when their father was falsely accused of being a Confederate spy by the members of the Union Army and imprisoned. Officers of the Union Army then occupied the Sánchez residence in Palatka, Florida. On one occasion Sánchez overheard various officers’ planning a raid and decided to alert the Confederate forces. She informed Captain John Jackson Dickison, commander of the local Confederate forces, of the plan. The result of her actions was that the Confederate forces surprised the Union troops in an ambush and captured the USS Columbine, a Union warship, on the day of the supposed raid in the "Battle of Horse Landing". This was one of the few instances in which a Union warship was captured by land-based Confederate forces during the Civil War.

== Early years ==
Lola Sánchez (birth name: María Dolores Sánchez (Note: Some sources state that her name was "Deloris" which is a misspelling of the Spanish name "Dolores")), who was born in Armstrong, Florida, was one of five siblings, which included two sisters Francesca (Panchita), Eugenia and two brothers Emanuel and Henry born to Cuban parents. Prior to 1850 the Sánchez family immigrated to the United States from Cuba and settled on the east bank of the St. Johns River in an area known as Federal Point opposite Palatka, Florida, a town situated about 63 miles (101 km) due south of Jacksonville.

== American Civil War ==
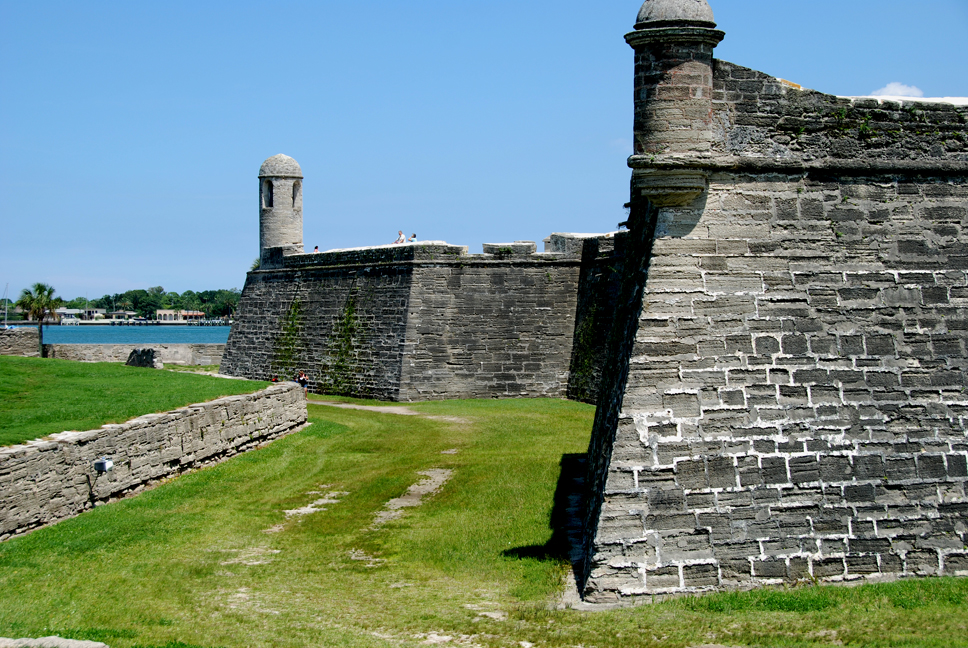
Castillo de San Marcos, where Lola Sánchez's father was imprisoned

Between 1840 and 1850, Palatka was a major shipping port for oaks, cedar, cotton, sugar and syrup. Goods were shipped down the Ocklawaha, loaded onto larger steamers in Palatka and plied north on the St. Johns River. In 1855, Col. Hubbard L. Hart started the first line of barge freighters on the Ocklawaha River. Palatka had become a popular tourist destination, however, its popularity as a tourist spot was interrupted by the Civil War, when gunboats cruised the waters and most of the town's residents had abandoned Palatka leaving it destitute and largely deserted. Palatka was soon occupied by Confederate troops which included one of Sánchez's brothers. On October 7, 1862, the USS Cimarron fired several shells from the St. Johns River over the town after seeing some Confederate cavalry. Mary E. Boyd, wife of Robert T. Boyd, one of the wealthiest men in Palatka, pleaded with Union Commander Maxwell Woodhull to spare Palatka, assuring him that the horse soldiers were not residents; he complied with her and spared the town. At one time, the town was occupied by 5,000 federal troops.

During the Union occupation, there was a leak of classified information about their plans reaching the Confederate Forces. The Union Army carried out an investigation to this respect and reached the false conclusion that Don Mauricio Sánchez, the family patriarch, was a spy. The fact that his son belonged to the Confederate Army may have been the cause of the misunderstanding. The elderly Mr. Sánchez, who was ill, was arrested and imprisoned in Fort San Marco, also known as "Castillo de San Marcos," in St. Augustine. The incident inspired Sánchez (Lola) to spy on the Union forces on behalf of the Confederacy with the aid of her sisters.

=== The "Battle of Horse Landing" ===
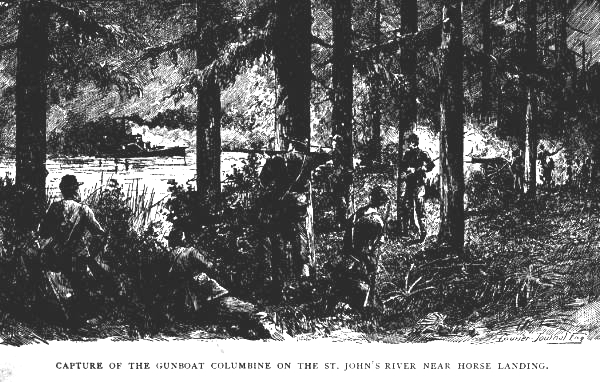
Capture of the USS Columbine in the "Battle of Horse Landing"

The Union Army occupied the Sánchez residence and guards were stationed to watch over the house. In the meantime, Lola and her sisters had to take care of their invalid mother and in order to make ends meet, they entertained the Union officers with a conversation. The sisters would often prepare supper for the officers and their guests, giving those who dined a false sense of security. On May 21, 1864, three Union officers arrived at the residence with guests and, as was the norm, were served supper. During the supper, the officers and their guests felt confident enough to discuss the plans that their unit had for a raid against the Confederate forces which was to go into effect the next morning. The plan consisted of a surprise attack on the Confederates while they slept with the aim of proceeding to St. Augustine to "liberate" supplies for the Union army.

Sánchez overheard the conversation and told her sisters what she heard. She decided that it was of utmost importance to notify Captain John Jackson Dickison, commander of the Confederate force the 2nd Florida Cavalry in Camp Davis, just a mile and a half from her home. Her sisters agreed to help by covering up her absence. Panchita entertained the troops while Eugenia prepared supper with the supposed help of Lola. Sánchez left her house that night and traveled, through the forest, alone on horseback. When she reached the ferry, the ferryman agreed to mind her horse while she crossed the river. After crossing the river she came upon a Confederate picket and told him what she heard, but the picket was unable to leave his post and lent her his horse. She then proceeded to the camp where she met with Capt. Dickison and told him what she knew. She then returned home, the whole event took an hour and a half, and her absence went unnoticed by the Union soldiers.

That night Capt. Dickison and his men crossed the St. Johns River and set a trap. They waited for the arrival of the Union transport and gunboat. On May 22, the Union force's plans were foiled when they were ambushed upon their arrival. The Confederate forces had placed artillery guns on the banks of the river and opened fire on the approaching Union gunboats. The skirmish which followed, officially known as the "Battle of Horse Landing", occurred south of St. Augustine. Union Colonel William H. Noble, commander of the 17th Connecticut Infantry, was wounded in the ambush and taken prisoner. The rest of the Union soldiers were either captured or killed. The "USS Columbine" a side-wheel steamer/gunboat was disabled and set on fire. Of the 148 men aboard the Columbine, only 66 survived and the rest were killed. This was one of the few instances in which a Union warship was captured by land-based Confederate forces during the Civil War and the only known incident in US history where a cavalry unit sank an enemy gunboat. The Confederates also captured a Union pontoon boat and renamed it "The Three Sisters" in honor of the Sanchez sisters.

Lola's sister Panchita, decided to plead for her father's release from prison. She obtained a pass to travel St. Augustine, where she pleaded for her father's freedom. Panchita offered to take the place of her father as a prisoner in exchange for his freedom. After listening to her plea, the prison authorities let her father go and they both were allowed to return home. The spy activities of the sisters, which continued during the duration of the war, were never discovered by the Union Army.

== Postwar and legacy ==
Little is known of what the sisters did as common civilians after the war. What is known is that the three sisters married former Confederate officers. Lola was married to Emmanuel Lopez and had a daughter named Leonicia Lopez born in St. Augustine. Lola died in 1895 and was buried in "Saint Ambrose Cemetery" in Elkton, Florida. Lola's sister Panchita married Captain John R. Miot and moved to South Carolina. Panchita had six children and died in 1931 in Columbia, South Carolina. Eugenia married Albert Crespin Rogero, a former comrade of Emanuel Lopez, and lived in St. Augustine. Eugenia died on January 12, 1932, and is buried in St. Ambrose Cemetery in Elkton, Florida.

In 1909, the State Convention of the United Daughters of the Confederacy was held in St. Augustine. The daughters of Lola and Panchita served as pages (a ceremonial position), in honor of their mothers' service to the Confederacy. The names of Lola Sánchez and her sisters appear in gold letters on a plaque with the names of 106 Confederate heroines that hangs in the United Daughters of the Confederacy Memorial Building in Richmond, Virginia.

== See also ==
- Hispanics in the American Civil War
- List of Cuban-Americans
