= Chassahowitzka =

Chassahowitzka may refer to:

- The Chassahowitzka River, a spring-fed river located in southwestern Citrus County, Florida
- The Chassahowitzka National Wildlife Refuge, part of the United States National Wildlife Refuge System, located on the west coast of Florida
