= John Carraway Smith =

Officer in the Confederate States Army during the American Civil War

- Born: Abt. 1819; South Carolina, USA
- Died: 29 July 1868 Madison County, Florida, USA
- Allegiance: Confederate States of America
- Branch: Confederate States Army
- Service years: 1862 - 1865
- Rank: Colonel
- Commands: 2nd Florida Cavalry Regiment
- Conflicts: American Civil War

Colonel John Carraway Smith (Abt. 1819 - July 29, 1868) was an officer in the Confederate States Army during the American Civil War.

== Pre-war ==
John Carraway Smith was born in South Carolina circa 1819. He married Sarah Bellamy on December 15, 1848, in Madison, FL. In 1850 he served as an attorney in Monticello, FL, and by 1860 he was a listed as a planter in Madison, FL.

== Civil War ==
Smith was commissioned Captain of Co. I, 2nd Regiment, Florida Cavalry on March 1, 1862, and served in that post until he was promoted Colonel over the entire regiment on September 8, 1862, in Tallahassee, FL. He saw service at the Battle of Olustee and was heavily criticized for not pursuing the Union Army after the battle. Even so, he continued to serve until he was paroled in Baldwin, FL May 17, 1865.

== Post-war ==
Smith only lived three years after the war ended, dying on July 29, 1868.
