= Battle of Gainesville =

1864 battle of the American Civil War

- Part of the American Civil War
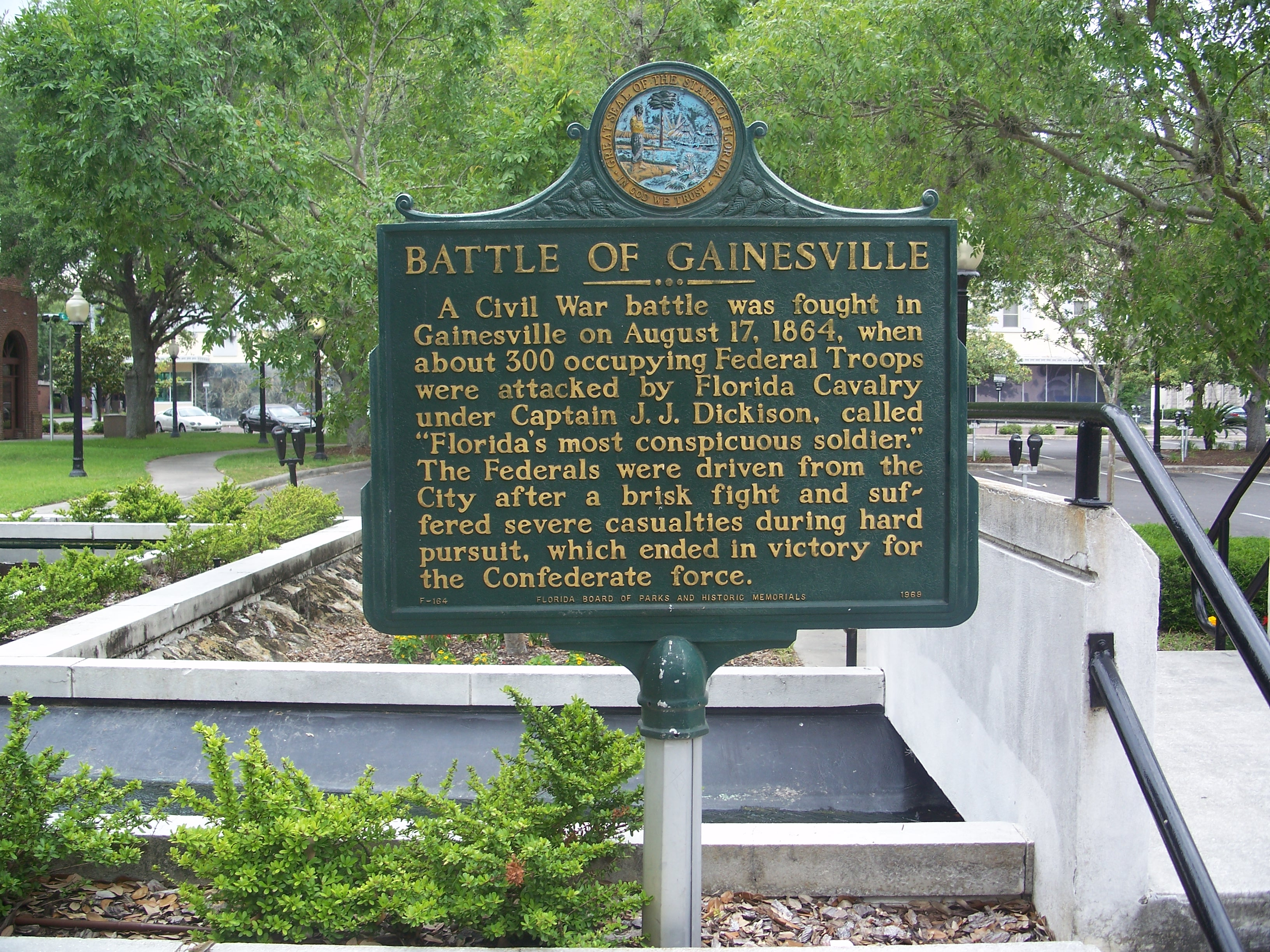
- Historical marker outside city hall about the Battle of Gainesville
Date	August 17, 1864
Location	Gainesville, Florida 29°39′07.18″N 82°19′30.24″W
Result	Confederate victory

Belligerents
United States (Union)	(Confederate States of America) CSA (Confederacy)

Commanders and leaders
Andrew L. Harris	John Jackson Dickison

Strength
342	About 290 (only 175 actually engaged)

Casualties and losses
221 (28 killed, 5 wounded, 188 captured)	6 (3 dead, 3 wounded)

The Battle of Gainesville was an American Civil War engagement fought on August 17, 1864, when a Confederate force defeated Union detachments from Jacksonville, Florida. The result of the battle was the Confederate occupation of Gainesville for the remainder of the war.

== Background ==
=== Skirmish ===
Gainesville, site of a railroad junction and depot in north central Florida, was the scene of a skirmish on February 14, 1864. About 50 Union troops entered the city intending to capture two trains. Company H of the 2nd Florida Cavalry with 130 men attempted to repulse this raid, but were defeated by the Union force, which successfully returned to Jacksonville after holding the town.

Listed in the War's Official Orders is a General Order signed by Brigadier General Truman Seymour on February 17, 1864, stating that he:

...especially desires to praise Capt. George E. Marshall, Co. G. 40th Mass. Mounted Volunteers, and his small command of forty-nine men who captured and held Gainesville for fifty-six hours, receiving and repulsing an attack from more than double his force, and, after fulfilling his mission successfully, returning to the designated place of rendevous [sic].

=== Prelude to battle ===
On August 15, Col. Andrew L. Harris of the 75th Ohio Mounted infantry left Baldwin with 173 officers and men from the Seventy-Fifth Ohio Volunteer Infantry. The Union troops on the way destroyed a picket post on the New River. At Starke, the Union troops were joined by the 4th Massachusetts Cavalry and some Florida Unionists.

== Battle ==
The Union troops arrived in Gainesville on August 17, to find the town occupied by one company of the Second Florida Cavalry. The Battle of Gainesville took place on August 17, in the town square; many townspeople viewed the fighting from the windows of the nearby Beville house.

They were attacked from the rear by soldiers of the 2nd Florida Cavalry under the command of Captain John Jackson Dickison (Companies H and F), supported by local militia, elements of 5th Florida Cavalry Battalion, and a small artillery battery of two cannons. Dickison's men numbered about 290, although only 175 entered Gainesville and engaged in the fighting.

The Union troops were taken by surprise and had not fully deployed when the Confederate attack began. After about two hours Col. Harris gave the order to retreat from Gainesville; the Confederates continued to close in on the disorganized Union columns. Union losses numbered 28 dead, 5 wounded, 86 missing or unaccounted for, 188 captured, 260 horses and a 12-pound howitzer. The Confederates lost three killed and five wounded, of whom two died the next day. About 40 Union troops, including Colonel Harris, escaped. He reported his column was destroyed by a large Confederate force of 600–800 men and three cannon.

After hearing his account, the remaining Union forces in the north central Florida area withdrew to the garrisons at Jacksonville and St. Augustine. Gainesville remained in Confederate control for the duration of the war.
