= USS Matthew Vassar =

Gunboat of the United States Navy

History

United States
- Acquired: 9 September 1861
- Commissioned: 25 January 1862
- Decommissioned: 10 July 1865
- Fate: Sold, 10 August 1865

General characteristics
- Displacement: 216 tons
- Length: 93 ft 7 in (28.52 m)
- Beam: 27 ft 2 in (8.28 m)
- Draft: 8 ft 6 in (2.59 m)
- Propulsion: sail
- Complement: 29
- Armament: 1 × 13 in (330 mm) mortar; 2 × 32-pounder guns

USS Matthew Vassar was a schooner purchased by the Union Navy during the American Civil War. She was used by the Union Navy primarily as a mortar gunboat, but also as a gunboat stationed off Confederate ports to prevent their trading with foreign countries.

== Service history ==
Matthew Vassar, a wooden, centerboard schooner was purchased by the Navy at New York City 9 September 1861; fitted out as a mortar schooner at New York Navy Yard; and commissioned 25 January 1862, Acting Master Hugh H. Savage in command. Assigned to the Mortar Flotilla, organized to neutralize Confederate forts guarding the sea approaches to New Orleans, Louisiana, the schooner got underway in mid February and sailed via Key West, Florida, and Ship Island, Mississippi, for the Mississippi River. She crossed the bar at Pass a l'Outre 18 March and anchored in the muddy waters of the Mississippi Delta.

After a month of preparing for the assault, the schooners moved upstream to carefully selected positions and opened fire on Fort St. Philip and Fort Jackson, New Orleans' main protection from attack from the sea. Matthew Vassar operated in the 2d Division of Commander David Porter's Mortar Flotilla during the 6 day cannonade. On the night of 24 April the bombardment rose to a mighty crescendo as Flag Officer David Farragut fought his strong fleet past the forts to capture the South's largest and wealthiest city. This bold stroke deprived the Confederacy of her most productive industrial center, tightened the Union blockade, and raised hope of restoring the entire Mississippi Valley to the Federal Government. When he was barely behind the forts, Farragut dashed off a word of thanks to Porter: "You supported us most nobly."

While Farragut led his steamers on a reconnaissance expedition up the Mississippi River, Porter took his schooners to Ship Island to prepare for an attack on Mobile, Alabama. There, Matthew Vassar and USS Sea Foam, 15 May, captured Confederate blockade running sloops Sarah and New Eagle trying to slip to sea, laden with cotton. After learning that Confederate batteries had been sited high on the hillside safe from his low projectory guns, Farragut ordered up the mortar boats to attack the river stronghold. Porter took his schooners to a point just below Vicksburg, Mississippi, where they shelled the Confederate batteries while Farragut's fleet steamed upstream past Vicksburg, 28 June, and joined Flag Officer Davis's flotilla. However, sufficient troops were not available to reduce the Confederate fortress; so Farragut, again supported by covering fire from the mortars, dashed downstream by Vicksburg and retired to New Orleans.

Ordered back to the U.S. East Coast, Matthew Vassar spent the rest of the war on blockade duty. She captured schooner Florida off Little River Inlet, North Carolina, as the blockade runner tried to slip in with a cargo of salt for the Confederacy 11 January 1863. On 3 March Acting Master's Mate George Drain led a boat crew from Matthew Vassar which destroyed a large boat at Little River Inlet. Proceeding up the western branch of the river to destroy salt works, the boat grounded and the crew was captured by Confederate troops. On 27 April, boat crews from Matthew Vassar and USS Monticello boarded and destroyed British blockade runner Golden Liner in Murrell's Inlet, South Carolina, with a cargo of flour, brandy, sugar, and coffee for the straitened South. Assigned to the East Gulf Blockading Squadron, 29 November 1864, Matthew Vassar took her last prize of the war, schooner John Hate, off St. Marks, Florida, 3 February 1865, as the blockade runner attempted to bring lead, blankets, and rope to the depleted South. After the war ended Matthew Vassar decommissioned at Philadelphia, Pennsylvania, 10 July 1865, and was sold at auction there 10 August.
