= 2nd Florida Cavalry Regiment (Confederate) =

Regiment from the Civil War

2nd Florida Cavalry (Confederate)
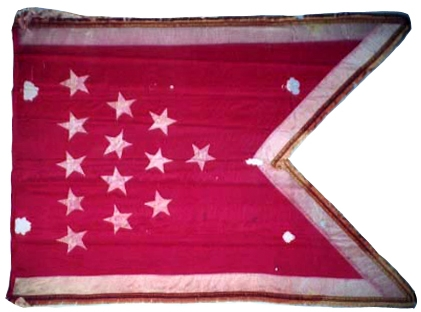
- Guidon of the Company B, 2nd Florida Cavalry, C.S.A.
- Active: April 1862 - May 1865
- Disbanded: May 10th, 1865
- Country: Confederate States of America
- Allegiance: Florida
- Branch: Confederate States Army
- Role: Cavalry
- Size: Regiment
- Engagements: American Civil War: Battle of Olustee; Battle of Natural Bridge; Battle of Gainesville

Commanders
- Regiment Commander: Colonel John Carraway Smith
- Notable commanders: Captain J. J. Dickison

The 2nd Florida Cavalry was a cavalry regiment of the Confederate States Army during the American Civil War. It was formed in Jacksonville in July 1861. Its men were raised from multiple counties, including St. John, Marion, Gadsden, Madison, Sumter, and modern day Lake County.

The regiment's commanders and staff were Colonel John Caraway Smith, Lt. Colonel Abner H. McCormick, Major Robert Harrison, and Sergeant Major W. A. Forward. Its best known company commander was arguably Captain John J. Dickinson, the "Swamp Fox" of Florida.

== Service History ==
The unit was organized with 1,190 men in the late spring of 1862.

The regiment fought in battles such as Olustee, Gainesville, Braddock's Farm, and Natural Bridge. It was also involved in the sinking of the USS Columbine.

== See also ==
- List of Florida Confederate Civil War units
