= USS Ariel (1862) =

Gunboat of the United States Navy

History

United States
- Acquired: 24 July 1863
- In service: 21 December 1862
- Out of service: 1865
- Captured: by Union Navy forces, 14 November 1862
- Fate: Sold, 28 June 1865

General characteristics
- Displacement: 20 tons
- Draft: 4 ft (1.2 m)
- Propulsion: sail
- Armament: one 12-pounder smoothbore gun

USS Ariel was a captured Confederate schooner acquired by the Union Navy from the prize court during the American Civil War. She was put into service by the Union Navy to patrol navigable waterways of the Confederacy to prevent the South from trading with other countries.

== Service history ==
Early in the Civil War—a small, privately owned schooner—worked out of Mobile, Alabama, under Confederate papers as a blockade runner. Few details of these operations have been found; but we do know that, on the night of 11 October 1862, she succeeded in slipping through the Federal blockade off Mobile Bay and sailed to Cuba laden with cotton. After arriving at Havana, Cuba, six days later, she delivered her cargo and filled up with lead, tin, medicine, wine, coffee, and other items needed by the South. On the evening of 14 November, as she was attempting to return to Mobile, Ariel was detected and captured by the Union screw steamer Huntsville. Sent to Key West, Florida, for adjudication, the schooner was eventually condemned as a lawful prize and was purchased by the Union Navy from the Key West prize court on 24 July 1863. Long before her formal acquisition, Ariel was fitted out for service in the East Gulf Blockading Squadron. On 21 December 1862, Rear Admiral Theodorus Bailey detached Acting Master's Mate William C. Molloy from the recently arrived bark Gem of the Sea and ordered him to assume command of the schooner; and she began service as a tender to the squadron flagship, the frigate St. Lawrence. For the remainder of her service in the Union Navy—some two and one-half years—she spent most of her time acting as a tender to a larger warship, often the flagship.

While carrying out the unglamorous, monotonous, but important tasks assigned to her as she labored in her ancillary capacity, Ariel managed to take three prizes. The first came on 6 January 1863, As she was cruising off Key Biscayne Bay, Florida, about mid-afternoon, she ". . . saw a suspicious looking craft . . ." sailing close to shore and immediately changed course to investigate The stranger attempted to flee; but, after a chase lasting over two and one-half hours, was overtaken and forced to heave to. The prize proved to be the sloop Good Luck, bound from New Smyrna, Florida, with a cargo of turpentine and cotton to be delivered to Nassau, New Providence Island, in the Bahamas. Her master, Edward Dexter, had already achieved considerable notoriety as a blockade runner. Since the sloop was leaky, Ariel towed her to Key West where she was turned over to the prize court. Her next score did not come until late in the year when she captured Magnolia on 16 December 1863. When Ariel took that Confederate sloop, she was in the Gulf of Mexico, some 70 miles west of Charlotte Harbor, Florida, and heading for Mobile, Alabama, with medicines and liquor.

Off the mouth of the Chassahowitzka River, Florida, on 28 May 1864, two boats from Ariel captured General Finegan carrying cotton and turpentine from Crystal River, Florida, and heading for Havana. The cargo was removed and sent to Key West; but, since she was leaking, the sloop was burned. About this time, Ariel became active in supporting Army operations. In mid-April 1864, she assisted troops which had been ordered to reinforce Fort Myers, Florida, and she continued to conduct similar operations through the ensuing summer. For instance, on the evening of 16 September, while Ariel was acting as a tender to screw steamer Hendrick Hudson, the schooner's commanding officer, Acting Master J. Russell, organized an expedition to a point near Tampa Bay, Florida, to take possession of a large amount of cotton owned by David Hope, a renowned skipper of southern blockade runners. What cotton the expedition could carry was sent to Key West and the rest was put to the torch. Thereafter, Ariel continued to serve along the Florida coast through the end of the Civil War. After the collapse of the Confederacy, she was sold at Key West on 28 June 1865 to a John Curry
