= Bugg Spring =

Spring in Lake County, Florida, United States

Coordinates: 28°45′07″N 81°54′06″W

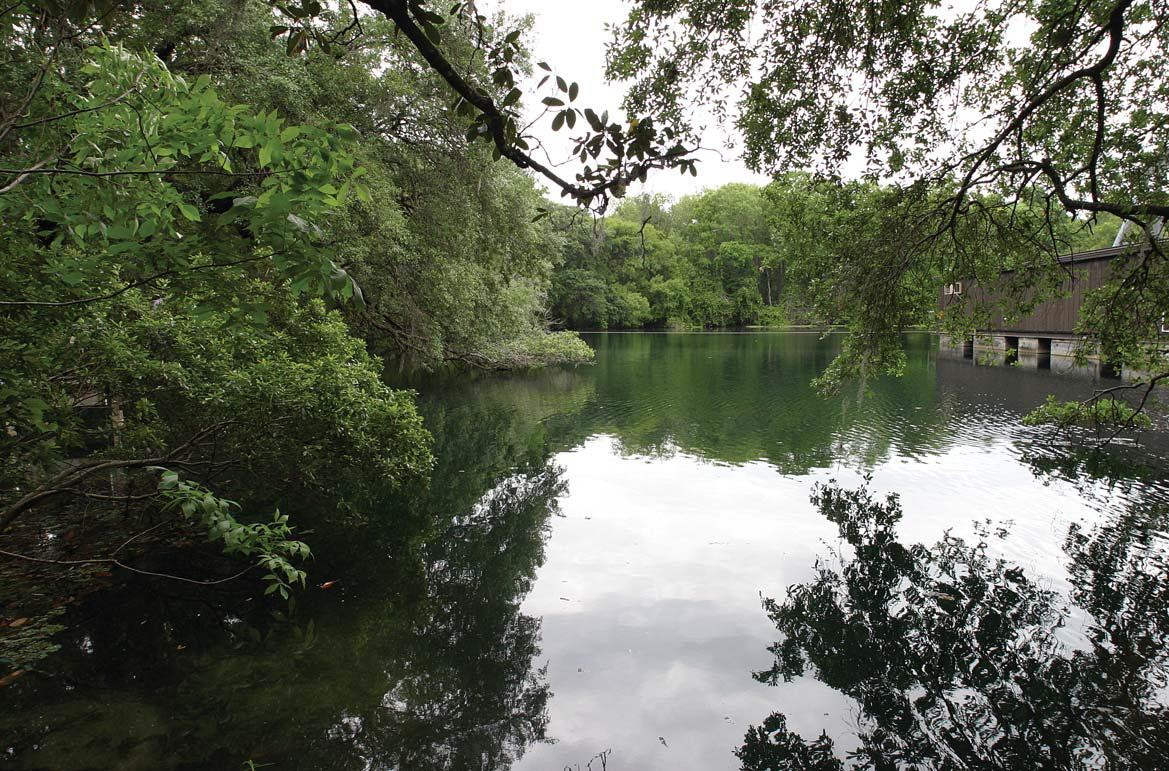
Bugg Spring Pool

Bugg Spring is a second magnitude spring near Okahumpka in Lake County, Florida. The spring has a 400 feet wide pool with little vegetation which goes down to 170 to 175 feet. Its outflow runs north as Bugg Spring Run into the Helena Run from Lake Denham and into Lake Harris.

The surrounding land was once home to a Native Seminole village prior to the Civil War. After the war, the surrounding land was the home of Confederate States Army Colonel J. J. Dickison. The 69-acre property was then purchased by the Branham's in 1923 who began leasing a portion of it to the Navy in 1956. On December 30, 2011, the entire property was sold to the Navy.

The spring is on the property of a facility of the Underwater Sound Reference Division of the Naval Undersea Warfare Center and is not accessible. It is mostly surrounded by swampland with sandhills to the south.
