= USS Columbine (1862) =

US Navy side-wheel steamer in service 1862-1864

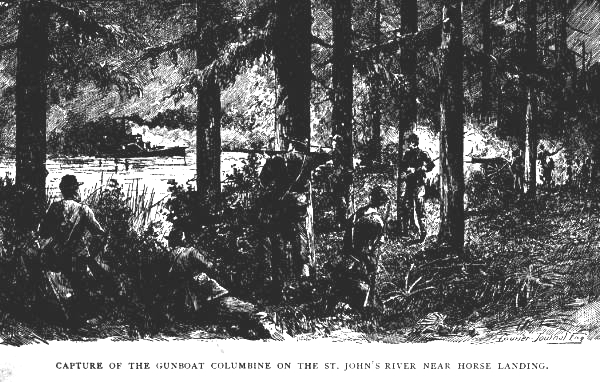
- The capture of "USS Columbine"

History

United States
- Name: USS Columbine
- Launched: 1850
- Acquired: 12 December 1862
- Fate: Sunk, 23 May 1864

General characteristics
- Type: side-wheel steamer
- Tonnage: 133
- Length: 117 ft (36 m)
- Beam: 36 ft (11 m)
- Draft: 6 ft (1.8 m)
- Propulsion: Steam engine; side wheel-propelled
- Speed: 10 kn (12 mph; 19 km/h)
- Complement: 25 officers and enlisted
- Armament: 2 × 20-pounder Parrott rifles

USS Columbine was a side-wheel steamer that patrolled with the South Atlantic Blockading Squadron of the United States Navy in the American Civil War.

On 22 May 1864, Columbine was planning a raid on Confederate supplies at St. Augustine, Florida, when local cavalry commander Captain John Jackson Dickison, alerted by Confederate spy Lola Sánchez, ambushed the vessel at Horse Landing. Half her crew were wounded, though only one man was killed, and the captured vessel was burned. It was one of the few times that a Union warship was destroyed by land-based forces in Florida.

== Service history ==
Columbine was originally a tugboat. The vessel was built in New York City in 1850 as A. H. Schultz, purchased by the Union Navy on 12 December 1862, outfitted by Howe & Cope-\land, New York City, and placed under the command of Acting Master J. S. Dennis. Columbine patrolled with the South Atlantic Blockading Squadron off Port Royal, South Carolina, from 6 January 1863 – 14 February 1864, when she arrived at Jacksonville, Florida. From 9–12 March, she participated in an expedition up the St. Johns River and Ocklawaha Rivers during which she took one prize.

After learning from Confederate spy Lola Sánchez, that on 21 May, the Union forces planned a surprise attack on the Confederates while they slept and with the intention of proceeding towards St. Augustine to "liberate" supplies for the Union army. Captain John Jackson Dickison, commander of the 2nd Florida Cavalry (CS), and his men crossed the St. Johns River that night and set a trap with an artillery piece from the Milton Light Artillery.

On the morning of 22 May, the Union forces plans were foiled when they were ambushed upon their arrival. The skirmish which followed, officially known as the Battle of Horse Landing, occurred south of St. Augustine and involved the 2nd Florida Cavalry (Confederate). Union Colonel William H. Noble, commander of the 17th Connecticut Infantry, was wounded in the ambush and taken prisoner. After the rudder was damaged and a steam pipe wrecked, Columbine could no longer be steered. She ran aground after 45 minutes of fighting, and Acting Ensign Frank Sandborn went ashore and surrendered the ship to Dickison. One landsman on the Columbine and three Negro seamen jumped off the boat, swam ashore, and marched some five days finally arriving at St. Augustine, Florida. Columbine was subsequently burned so that she would not be re-captured by the U.S. Navy gunboat USS Ottawa, which was only about five miles upstream.

More than half of Columbine's crew were wounded in the fighting. Official records of Columbine indicate that only one seaman was killed. The remaining seamen were eventually transferred to Andersonville, Georgia Prison; the officers being sent to Macon, Georgia. The destruction of Columbine was one of the few instances in which a Union warship was destroyed by land-based forces during the Civil War in Florida. During the spring of 1864, the Confederates managed to sink four other Union ships in the St. Johns River with the use of a new weapon: the underwater mine. The wreck has only recently been discovered and a marker was placed on the site where Dickison and his men captured the "USS Columbine by the Florida Confederation for the Preservation of Historic Sites, Inc.
