= Pulau Palawan =

Name transcription(s)
  - Chinese: 巴拉湾岛
  - Pinyin: Bālāwān Dǎo
  - Malay: Pulau Palawan
  - Tamil: பல்லவன் கடற்கரை
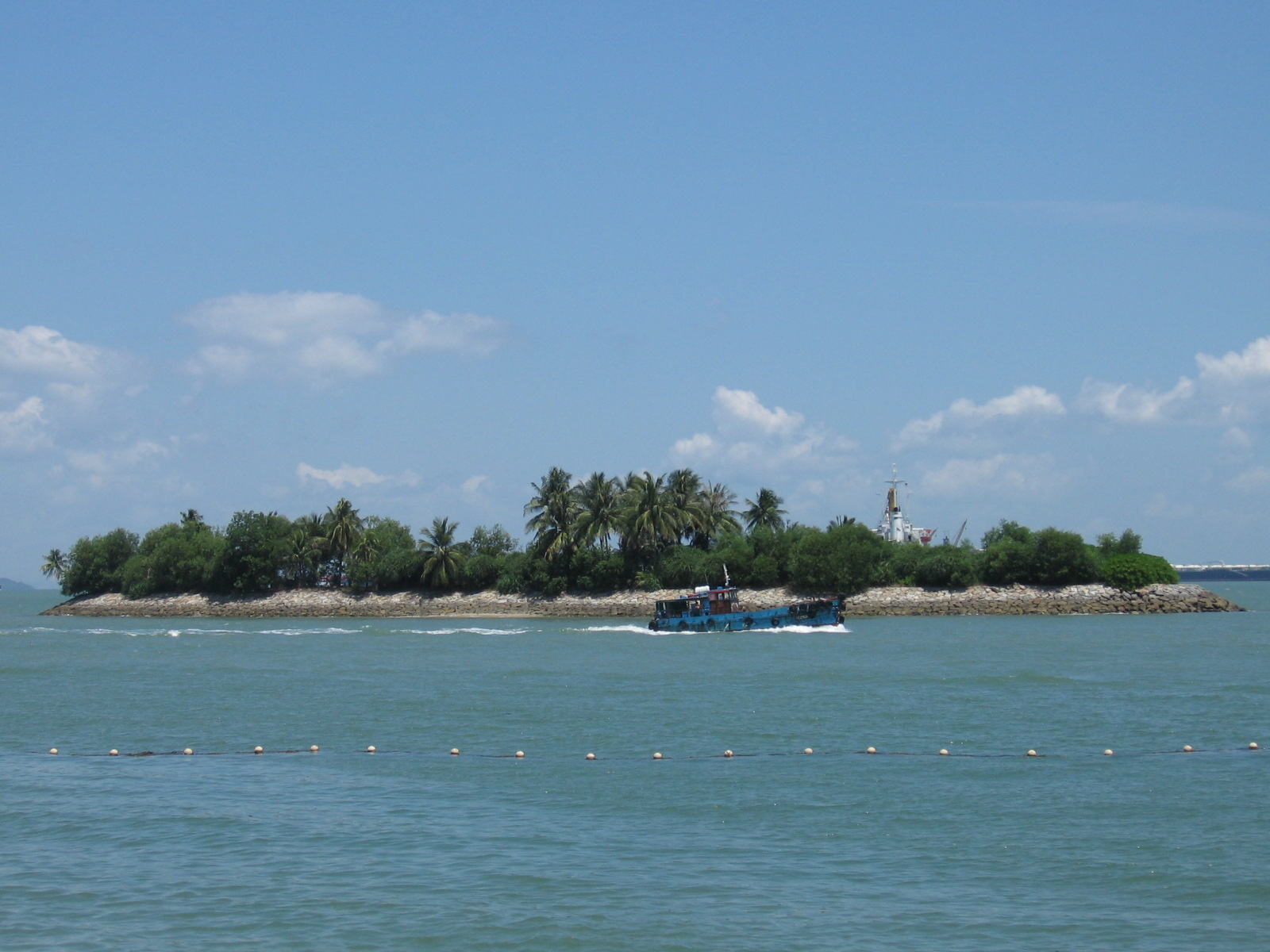

- Location of Pulau Palawan within Singapore
- Coordinates: 1.24930°N 103.81528°E
- Country: Singapore

Pulau Palawan, also known as Palawan Island, is a slipper-shaped islet located just off the southwestern coast of Sentosa, south of Singapore. It lies approximately opposite Beach Station of the Sentosa Express monorail system, which is between Siloso Beach and Palawan Beach. Palawan is most likely a variant of the Malay word pahlawan, meaning "hero" or "warrior".

Originally a reef known as Serembu Palawan, and marked on at least one map as "Palawan Reef", it was renamed Pulau Palawan after land reclamation. The island now has an area similar to that of Pulau Biola, about 0.4 hectares (0.99 acres).

== Confusion with "Palawan Island" off Palawan Beach ==
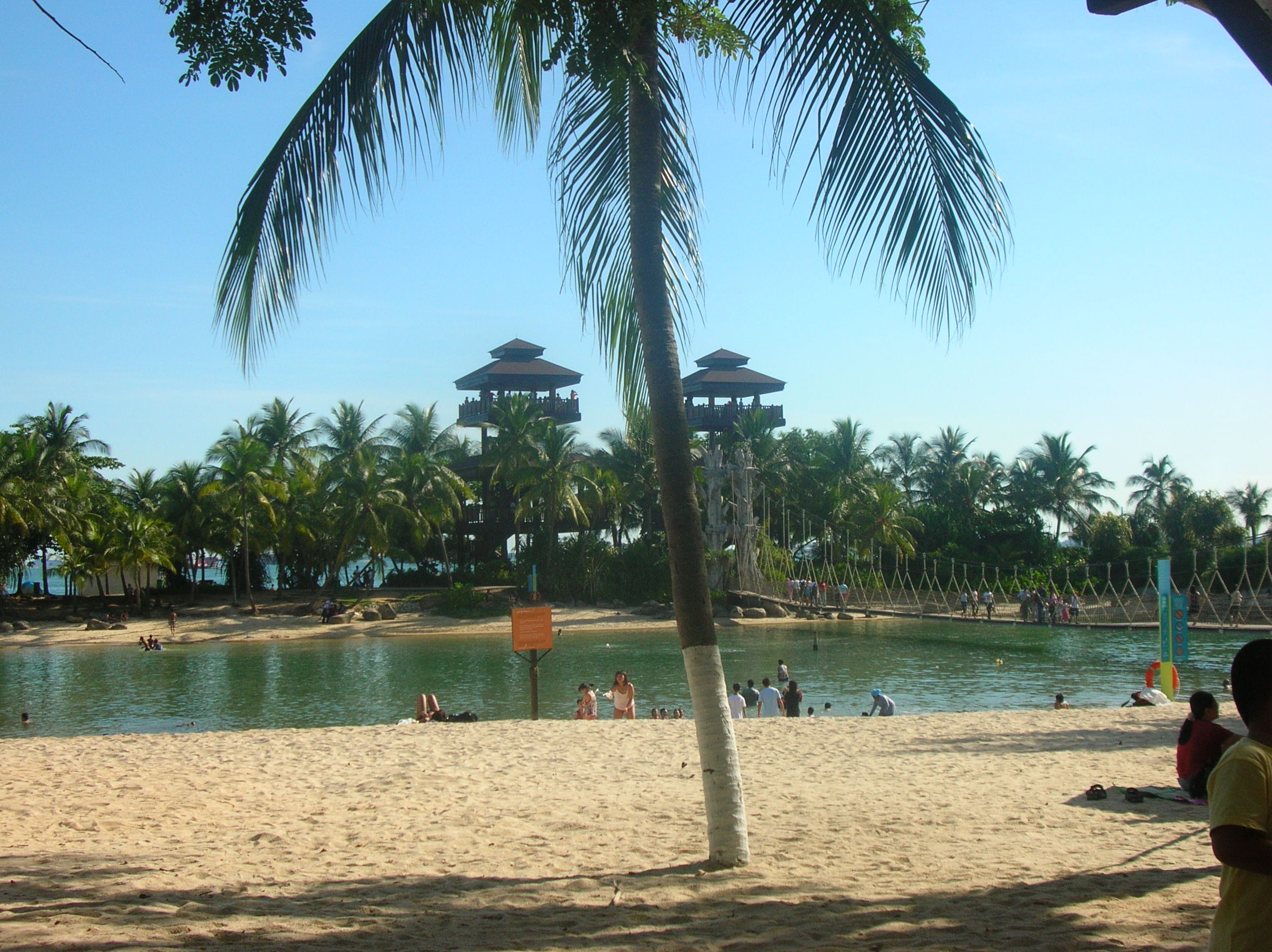
The unnamed islet linked to Palawan Beach by a suspension bridge

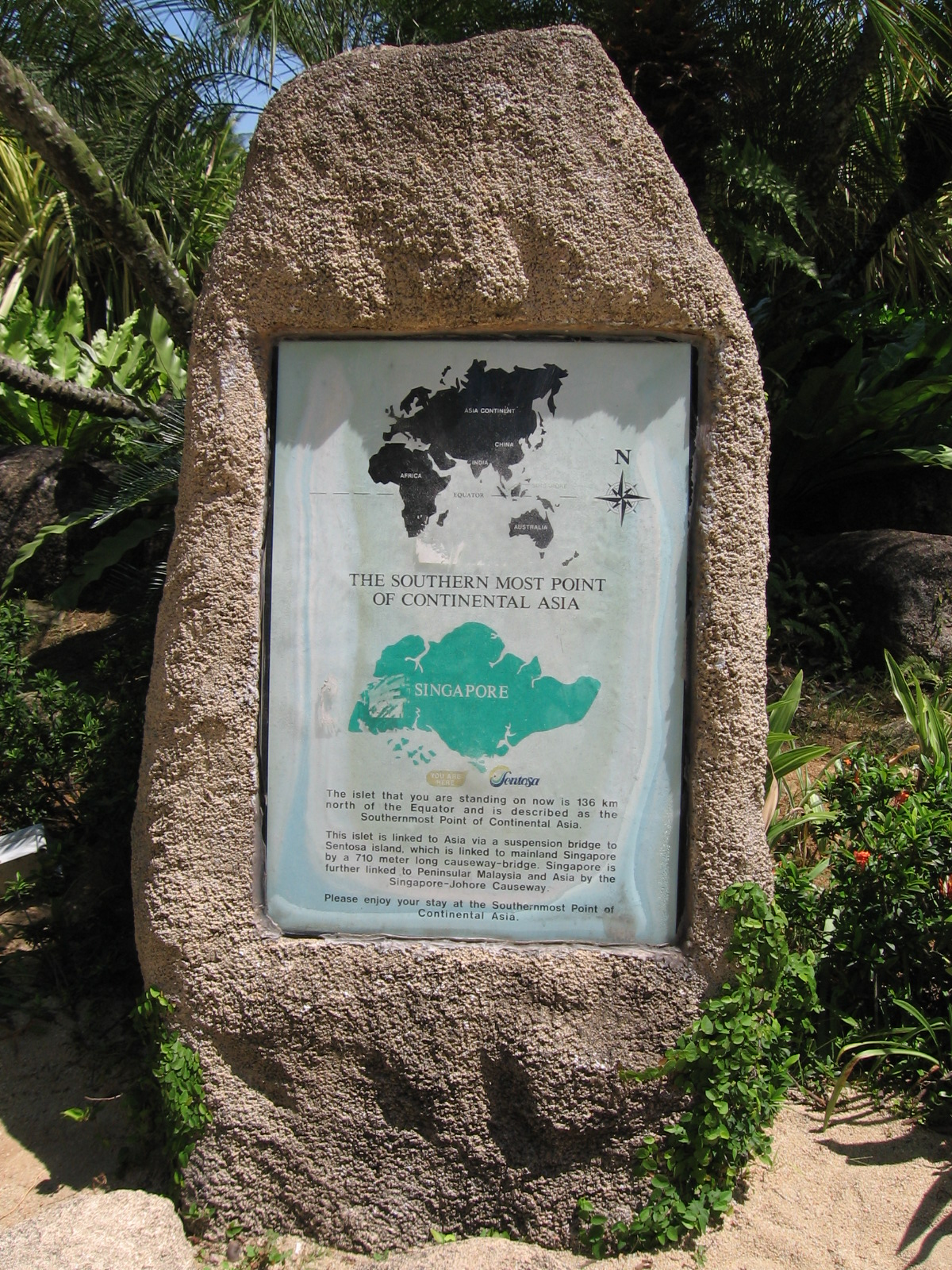
A sign declaring the islet to be the "southernmost point of Continental Asia"

Pulau Palawan is not to be confused with a U-shaped artificial sandy islet - named "Palawan Island" on some maps - off Sentosa's Palawan Beach. This islet is linked to Palawan Beach by a simple suspension bridge. It has two lookout towers, and there is a sign on the islet erected by the Sentosa Development Corporation declaring that it is the "southernmost point of Continental Asia". This may be disputed on the ground that the islet is not part of Continental Asia, as it is only linked to Sentosa by a bridge. (Sentosa itself is connected to the main island of Singapore by a causeway, and Singapore is in turn linked to Peninsular Malaysia by a causeway. In addition, another beach on Sentosa called Tanjong Beach is further south than the islet.) Geographically, the actual southernmost point of mainland Eurasia continent is located in Tanjung Piai in the neighboring State of Johor of Malaysia.

== See also ==
- Geography of Singapore
