= USS Commodore Jones =

Gunboat of the United States Navy

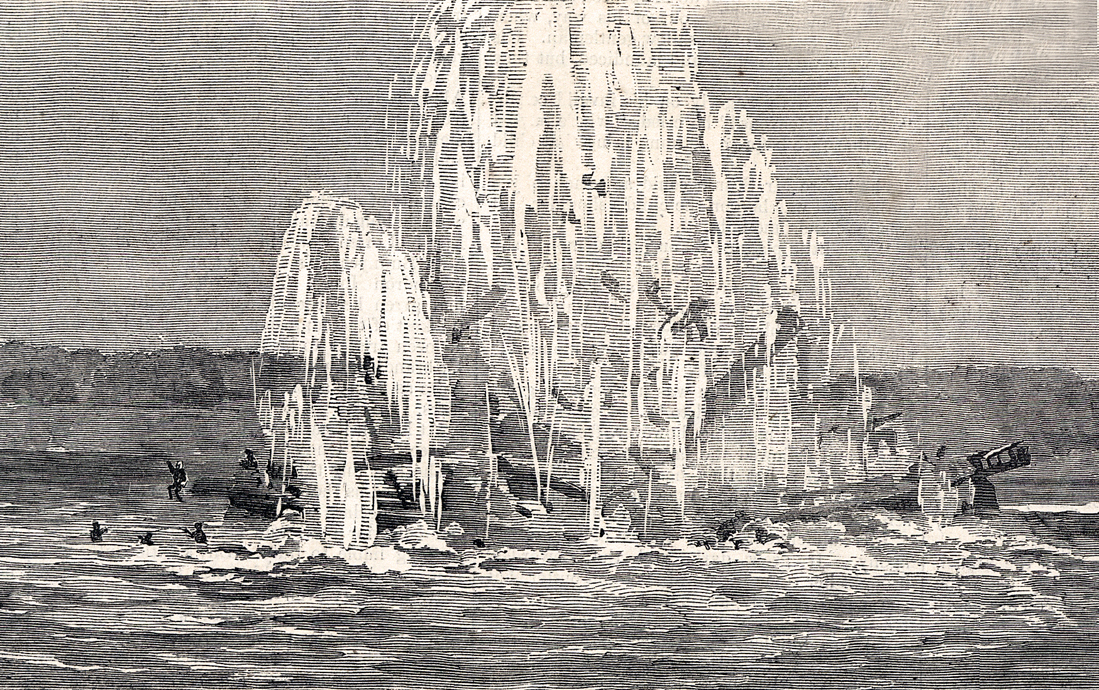
- USS Commodore Jones strikes a mine on the James River, Virginia, in 1864.

History

United States
- Name: USS Commodore Jones
- Acquired: 1863
- Commissioned: 1 May 1863
- Stricken: 1864
- Fate: Sunk by electric mine 6 May 1864

General characteristics
- Type: Gunboat
- Displacement: 542 long tons (551 t)
- Length: 154 ft (47 m)
- Beam: 32 ft 6 in (9.91 m)
- Draft: 11 ft 8 in (3.56 m)
- Propulsion: Steam engine; side-wheel propelled
- Speed: 12 kn (14 mph; 22 km/h)
- Complement: 88
- Armament: 4 × 9 in (230 mm) smoothbore guns, 1 × 50-pounder rifle, 2 × 30-pounder rifles, 4 × 24-pounder guns

USS Commodore Jones was a ferryboat acquired by the Union Navy during the American Civil War. Ferryboats were of great value, since, because of their flat bottom and shallow draft, they could navigate streams and shallow waters that other ships could not.

She was outfitted by the Union Navy as a heavily armed gunboat and assigned to the blockade of the waterways of the Confederate States of America.

== Purchased in New York City in 1863 ==
Commodore Jones – an armed, side-wheel ferry – was purchased at New York City in 1863 and commissioned on 1 May 1863, Lieutenant Commander J. G. Mitchell in command.

== Civil War operations ==
=== Assigned to the North Atlantic Blockade ===
Serving with the North Atlantic Blockading Squadron, Commodore Jones operated in Virginia's rivers and on her coast from 11 May 1863. She performed picket and patrol duty, dragged for torpedoes (mines), skirmished with enemy cavalry, shelled shore installations, and captured contraband goods with her shore parties.

She joined in the evacuation of West Point, Virginia from 31 May – 1 June, in the expedition up the Mattapony River from 3–7 June, in the Chickahominy River demonstration of 10–13 June, and put to sea in search of CSS Tacony from 13 to 19 June.

=== Commodore Jones strikes a mine and sinks ===
She patrolled the James River frequently in the course of her service, and there on 6 May 1864, she was destroyed by an electrically fired mine.
