= USS Sea Foam (1861) =

Gunboat of the United States Navy

History

United States
- Acquired: 14 September 1861
- Commissioned: 27 January 1862
- Decommissioned: 16 May 1865
- Fate: sold, 12 June 1865

General characteristics
- Displacement: 251 tons Ship length=112 ft 6 in (34.29 m)
- Beam: 26 ft (7.9 m)
- Draft: 9 ft 3 in (2.82 m)
- Propulsion: sail
- Armament: 1 × 13 in (330 mm) mortar; 2 × 32-pounder guns

USS Sea Foam was a brig purchased by the Union Navy during the American Civil War.

She was used by the Union Navy primarily as a mortar gunboat, but also as a gunboat stationed off Confederate ports to prevent their trading with foreign countries. Towards the war's end, she was converted into a storeship, keeping fleet ships supplied with necessary materiel.

== Service history ==
Sea Foam was a wooden-hulled hermaphrodite brig purchased by the Navy at New York City on 14 September 1861; fitted out as a mortar vessel at the New York Navy Yard; and commissioned on 27 January 1862, Acting Master Henry E. Williams in command. Sea Foam was assigned to the Mortar Flotilla which was established early in 1862 to support Flag Officer David Farragut's New Orleans, Louisiana, campaign. A few days later, the ship departed New York Harbor and proceeded, via Key West, Florida, and Ship Island, Mississippi, to the mouth of the Mississippi River. She entered the river through Pass a l'Outre on 18 March and spent the next month preparing for the impending attack on the Confederate forts which guarded the river.

On the afternoon of 18 April, Sea Foam and her sister mortar boats of the flotilla's third division opened fire on Fort Jackson and, during the following four hours, hurled 43 shells at the fort. Before dawn the next day, she resumed the bombardment and kept it up until well after sunset that evening, firing 88 shells during the day. She continued this pattern of operations during the following four days. Then, at midnight on the night of 23 and 24 April, she opened fire to join the bombardment which preceded Farragut's dash up river past the forts. She increased the rate of her fire to her maximum tempo some three and one-half hours later as Farragut's ships moved within range of the Southern batteries, and she maintained the pace until the Union ships were safely above the forts.

After New Orleans surrendered, Porter took his flotilla to a position off Mobile Bay to await Farragut. On 15 May, Sea Foam and USS Matthew Vassar captured sloops Sarah and New Eagle, both laden with cotton. However, the Flag Officer was delayed by operations on the Mississippi and, after learning of the strength of the Confederate works at Vicksburg, recalled Porter and the mortar vessels. In returning up the Mississippi River, Sea Foam ran aground on a sand bar below New Orleans and remained down river while her sister mortar boats supported Farragut's operations in the vicinity of Vicksburg during June and July 1862. She did get into action again on the Mississippi in the spring of 1863 when Farragut dashed past the Port Hudson batteries to stop Confederate commerce across the Mississippi from the Red River.

For the next year, the brig, badly hampered by yellow fever, remained on the Mississippi River supporting the operations of the West Gulf Blockading Squadron. On 3 May 1864, she was ordered to New York City for repairs and replacement of her worn mortar. However, she was sent on to Boston, Massachusetts, and was decommissioned at the Boston Navy Yard on 31 May. Restored to fighting trim, Sea Foam was recommissioned at Boston on 1 August 1864 and assigned to the South Atlantic Blockading Squadron. She served as a store ship at Port Royal, South Carolina, until ordered north in January 1865. Sea Foam served in the North Atlantic Blockading Squadron for the closing months of the war. Sea Foam was decommissioned at Boston on 16 May 1865. She was sold at public auction there on 12 June 1865 to A. C. DeWells.
