= 17th Connecticut Infantry Regiment =

- Active: August 28, 1862 - July 19, 1865
- Country: United States
- Allegiance: Union
- Branch: Infantry
- Engagements: American Civil War: Mud March; Battle of Chancellorsville; Battle of Gettysburg; Battle of Williamsport; Siege of Charleston; Capture of Camp Milton; Battle of Horse Landing; Battle of Braddock's Farm

The 17th Connecticut Infantry Regiment was an infantry regiment that served in the Union Army during the American Civil War.

== Service ==
The 17th Connecticut Infantry Regiment was organized at Bridgeport, Connecticut, on August 28, 1862, under the command of Colonel William H. Noble.

The regiment was attached to Defenses of Baltimore, Maryland, VIII Corps, Middle Department, to October 1862. 2nd Brigade, 1st Division, XI Corps, Army of the Potomac, to August 1863. 2nd Brigade, Gordon's Division, South End Folly Island, South Carolina, X Corps, Department of the South, to February 1864. 1st Brigade, Ames' Division, District of Florida, Department of the South, to April 1864. District of Florida, Department of the South, to October 1864. 4th Separate Brigade, District of Florida, Department of the South, to July 1865.

The 17th Connecticut Infantry mustered out of service July 19, 1865.

== Detailed service ==
Left Connecticut for Baltimore, Maryland, September 3. Duty at Fort Marshall, Defenses of Baltimore, October 1862. At Tennallytown, building Fort Kearney, October 15-November 3. March to Thoroughfare Gap and Chany November 3–12. Duty at Brook's Station, Virginia, December 1862 to April 1863. "Mud March" January 20–24, 1863. Chancellorsville Campaign April 27-May 6. Battle of Chancellorsville May 1–5. Gettysburg Campaign June 11-July 24. Served in the Battle of Gettysburg July 1–3. Next the regiment saw action at Hagerstown, Maryland, July 11–13. Moved to Folly Island, South Carolina, August 1–12 as part of the initial Union occupation of that island. Siege operations on Morris Island, South Carolina, against Forts Wagner and Gregg, and against Fort Sumter and Charleston August 15-September 7. Capture of Forts Wagner and Gregg September 7. Moved to Folly Island, South Carolina, and duty there, operating against Charleston, South Carolina, February 1864. Expedition to John's and James Islands February 6–14. Ordered to Jacksonville, Fla., February 22, and duty there April 15. Moved to St. Augustine, Florida, April 15–17, and duty there June 1865. Action at Welaka May 19, 1864 (detachment). Expedition to Camp Milton May 31-June 3. Action at Milton June 2. Whitesville July 24. Companies A, C, I, and K at Picolata, St. Johns River, July 18, 1864, to February 1865. Companies A, E, F, and H moved to Jacksonville July 22, 1864, and participated in the expedition to Baldwin July 23–28. Expedition to Enterprise September 28, 1864. Companies C, F, and H at Lake City, Florida, and Companies G and I at Tallahatchie May and June 1865. Regiment moved from St. Augustine to Jacksonville June 9, and duty there July 7.

== Casualties ==
The regiment lost a total of 128 men during service; 5 officers and 48 enlisted men killed or mortally wounded, 1 officer and 74 enlisted men died of disease.

== Commanders ==
- Colonel William H. Noble - wounded in action at the Battle of Chancellorsville; captured December 24, 1864, at Horse Landing, Florida, and paroled April 8, 1865
- Lieutenant Colonel Douglas Fowler - commanded at the Battle of Gettysburg and killed in action July 1, 1863
- Lieutenant Colonel Albert H. Wilcoxson - wounded in action and captured March 5, 1865, at Dunn's Lake, Florida
- Major Allen G. Brady - commanded at the Battle of Chancellorsville following Col Noble's wounding; commanded at the Battle of Gettysburg following the death of Ltc Fowler; wounded in action July 2, 1863, at Gettysburg

== Notable members ==
- Private Anthony Comstock, Company H - United States Postal Inspector and author responsible for the creation of what became known as the Comstock Law
- Private Elias Howe Jr., Company D - Inventor and sewing machine pioneer. He took on the position of Regimental Postmaster, serving out his time riding to and from Baltimore with war news.

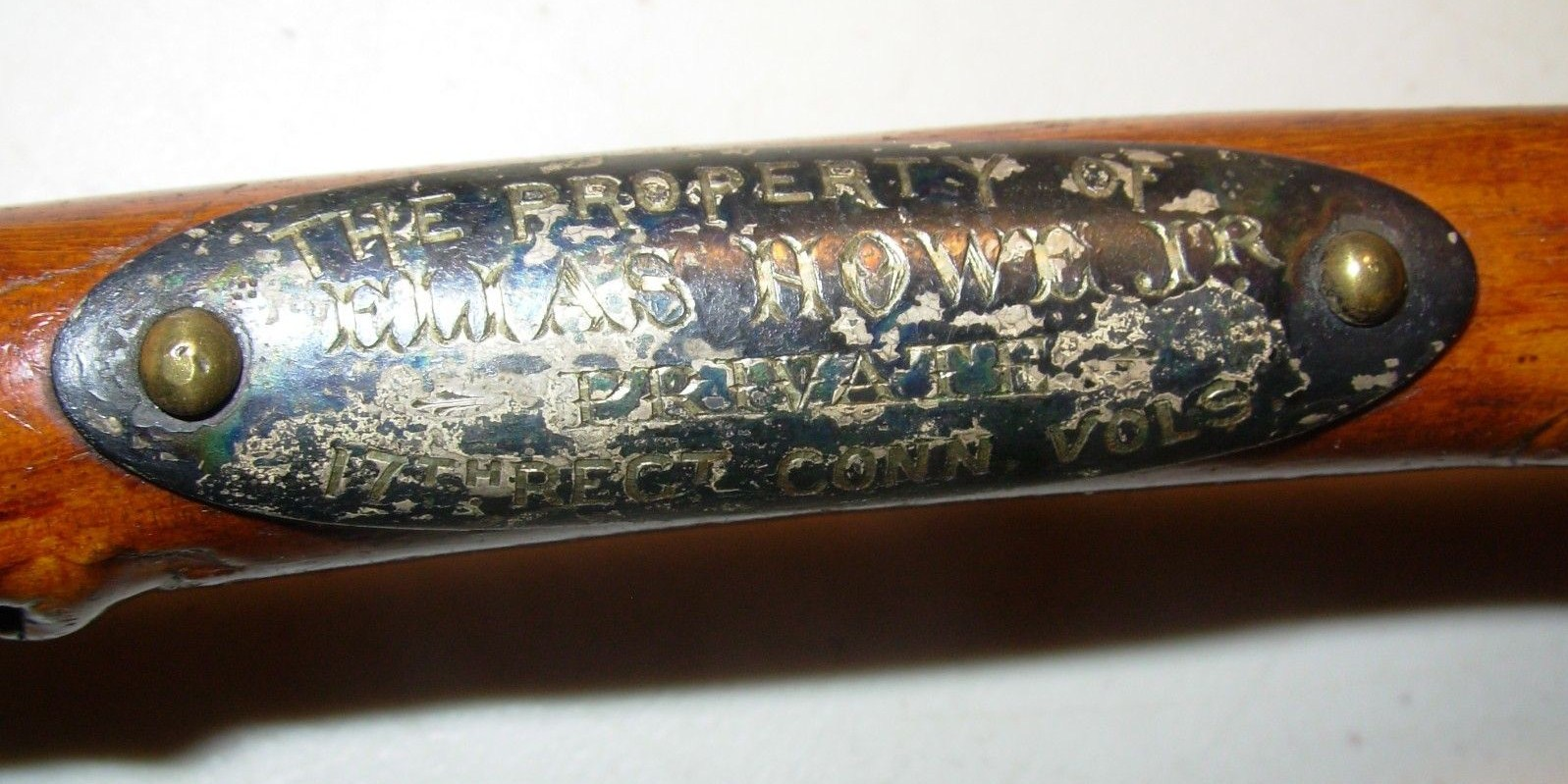
Notable Member: Private Elias Howe Jr's ID plaque on his shillelagh (cane). Used while he was serving as the 17th's Regimental Postmaster from 1862-1865.

== See also ==
- Connecticut in the American Civil War
- List of Connecticut Civil War units
