= Chassahowitzka River =

River in Florida, United States

Coordinates: 28.715483°N 82.5758541°W

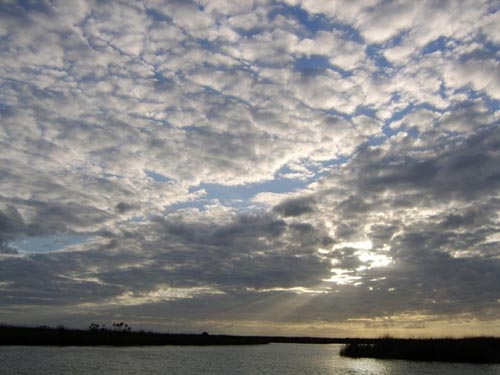
Sunset in a brackish estuary

The Chassahowitzka River (/ˌtʃæsəhəˈwɪtskə/, locally /ˌtʃæzəˈwɪtskə/) is a spring-fed river located in southwestern Citrus County, Florida. The 5-mile-long (8 km) river is home to hundreds of bird species, including the bald eagle, and serves as a common refuge for the West Indian manatee. In 1941, approximately 31,000 acres (13,000 ha) of its saltwater creeks, freshwater tributaries, and hardwood hammocks were designated as Chassahowitzka National Wildlife Refuge. The river is accessible by boat from a nearby public boat ramp located at a campground that also bears its Indian name which means "land of hanging pumpkins"—a reference to a wild variety that once grew along its banks.

The headwater of the river is Chassahowitzka Spring, a first-magnitude spring visible from the campground dock. A group of smaller sister springs are located in a creek just upstream from the main vent. Several of these sister springs are interconnected via underwater caves that snorkelers can dive through while holding their breath. However, great care must be taken when diving through these caves, as there have been at least 4 drownings in the underwater tunnels and caves since 1989, the most recent occurring in 2011.

Further downstream, similar freshwater tributaries feed into the Chassahowitzka River, some of which mix with salt water as the river weaves its way toward the Gulf. This creates brackish creeks and bays, where it is quite common to catch fish species such as spotted seatrout, redfish, or common snook to name just a few. Other river staples river include striped mullet, which can be seen in schools through the clear water or at times leaping out of the water, and the blue crab which is often netted or trapped by local fishermen. It is very common to see several species of herons and egrets, including the great blue heron as well as the occasional large alligator, although they are often seen some distance from springs and boats. The river is well known for its navigational hazards, mainly due to large rocks hidden from the sight of fast-moving motorboats that venture outside the narrow channel.

There are cabins dotted along the outer portion of the river just before "Buzzard Bay," that are privately owned. Dog Island is a recreational area with a restroom and dock, located off the main channel just before John's Island and the Gulf.

== Gallery ==
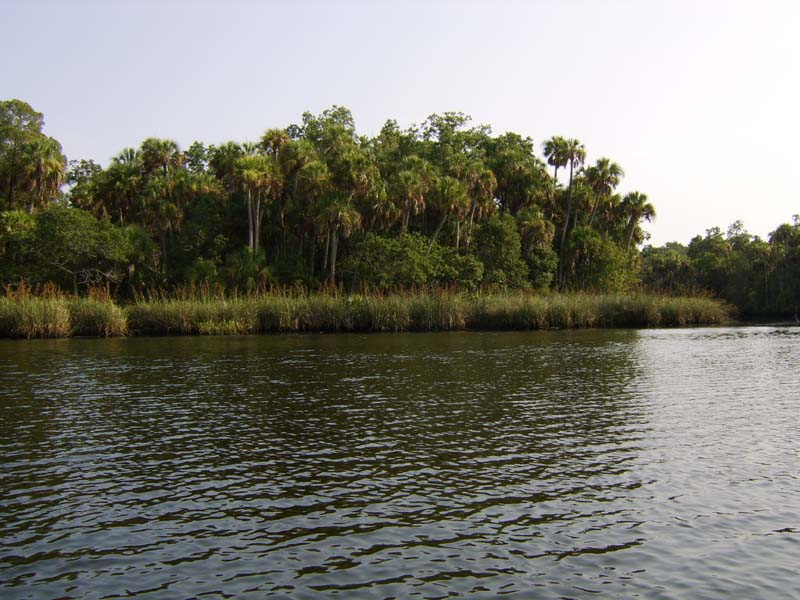

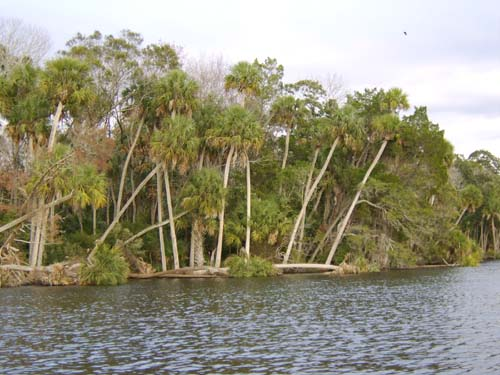

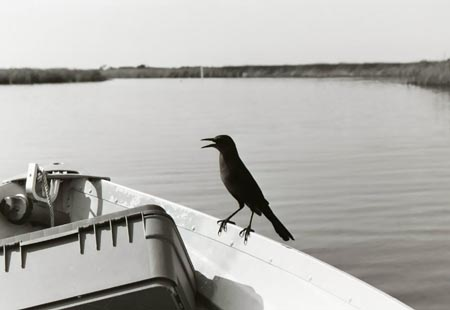
A friendly grackle, on the way to Buzzard Bay

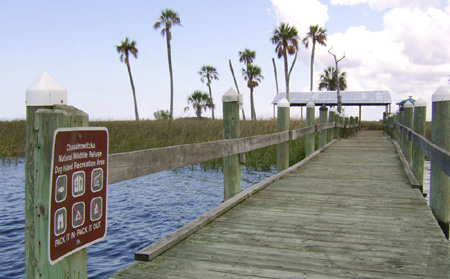
Dog Island Recreational Area

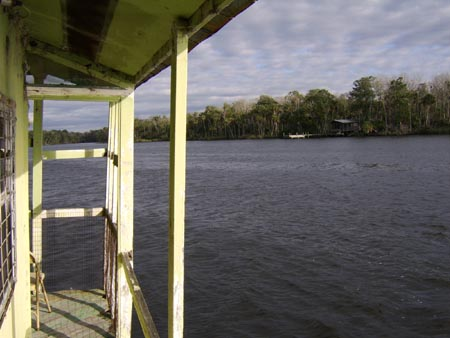
A view from Tom's Cabin showing a neighboring cabin

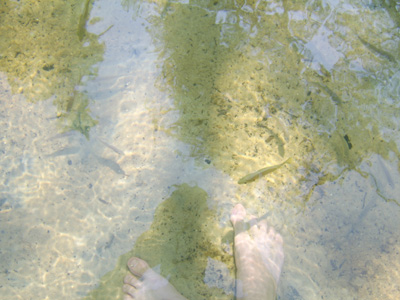
Sunfish and pilchards inhabiting Beard Creek, a location now well known to weekend canoers, but at one time was less traveled

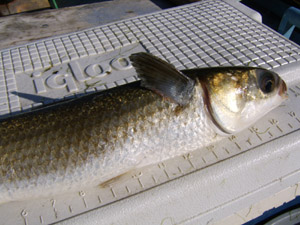
A striped mullet caught by cast netting on the river

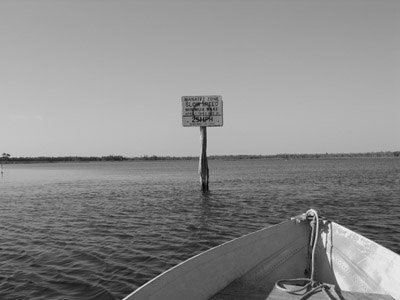
Manatee speed zones run from the mouth of Buzzard Bay until John's Island during the summer

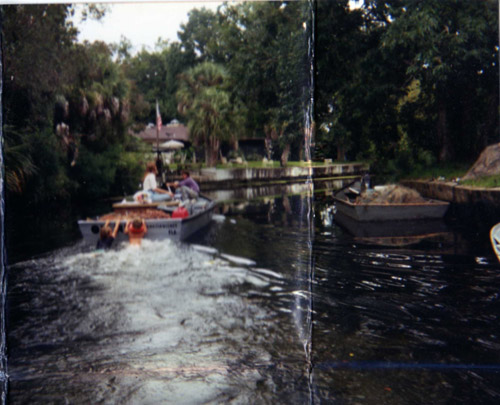
Local boys being pulled behind a well boat near "Baldies"

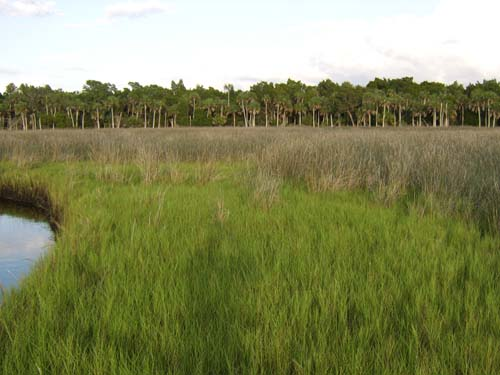

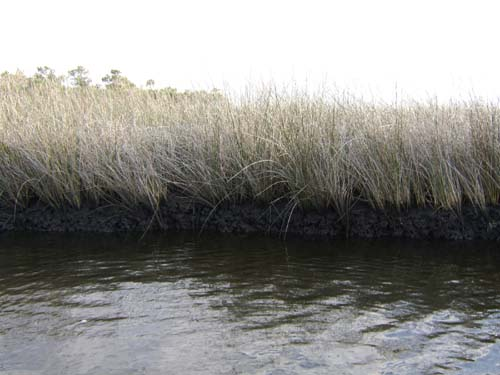
